= List of cities, towns and villages in Fars province =

A list of cities, towns and villages in Fars province of southern Iran:

== Alphabetical ==
Cities are in bold text; all others are villages.

=== A ===
Ab Anar | Ab Anbar-e Jahad Ashayiri | Ab Anjir | Ab Anjir | Ab Araq | Ab Asemani | Ab Bada | Ab Badamu | Ab Band | Ab Barik Industrial Estate | Ab Barik | Ab Bid | Ab Bidak | Ab Bid-e Dalun | Ab Bid-e Doshman Ziari | Ab Bid-e Sar Anjeli | Ab Chenaran | Ab Chenaru | Ab Dozduiyeh | Ab Garm | Ab Garm | Ab Garm-e Olya | Ab Gui | Ab Hoseyn | Ab Javan | Ab Kabak | Ab Kaneh | Ab Katan | Ab Konaru | Ab Mahi | Ab Mik | Ab Morvarid | Ab Narak | Ab Pakhshan | Ab Pardeh | Ab Qalat | Ab Qorqoru | Ab Sefid | Ab Sheykh | Ab Shib | Ab Shirin | Ab Shirin | Ab Soru | Ab Surakh | Ab Zalu | Ab Zangi | Abad Shahpur | Abadeh | Abadeh Abgarm | Abadeh Tashk | Abadeh | Abadeh | Abali | Abbad | Abbasabad | Abbasabad | Abbasabad | Abbasabad | Abbasabad | Abbasabad | Abbasabad | Abbasabad | Abbasabad | Abbasabad | Abbasabad-e Eskandari | Abbasabad-e Gazak | Abdol Karimi | Abdollahabad | Abdollahi-ye Olya | Abdollahi-ye Sofla | Abdui | Abdun | Ab-e Gandu | Ab-e Garm | Ab-e Narak | Ab-e Now-e Khani Yek | Abedabad | Abgarm | Abgarm | Abgarm | Abgarm-e Pir Sohabi | Abgasht-e Madui | Abgol | Abkureh | Abnow | Abraheh | Absard | Abshur | Abtut | Abu Ali | Abu Askar | Abu Hana | Abu Nasr | Abu ol Hayat | Abu ol Mehdi | Abu ol Verdi | Abu Tarbeh | Abuzarabad | Abyan | Ades Kari-ye Olya | Aghan | Aghoseh | Ahangari | Ahel | Ahla Kuh | Ahmad Mahmudi | Ahmadabad Deris | Ahmadabad | Ahmadabad | Ahmadabad | Ahmadabad | Ahmadabad | Ahmadabad | Ahmadabad | Ahmadabad | Ahmadabad | Ahmadabad | Ahmadabad | Ahmadabad-e Kateh | Ahmadabad-e Korbal | Ahmadabad-e Pol Abgineh | Ahmadun | Akbarabad | Akbarabad | Akbarabad | Akbarabad | Akbarabad | Akbarabad-e Hashivar | Akbarabad-e Sardasht | Akbari | Ala ol Dowleh | Alamabad | Alamarvdasht | Alamdan-e Olya | Alamdan-e Sofla | Ali Mohseni | Ali Resideh | Ali Shahi | Aliabad | Aliabad | Aliabad | Aliabad | Aliabad | Aliabad | Aliabad | Aliabad | Aliabad | Aliabad | Aliabad | Aliabad | Aliabad | Aliabad | Aliabad | Aliabad | Aliabad | Aliabad | Aliabad | Aliabad | Aliabad-e Abgarm | Aliabad-e Bejuyeh | Aliabad-e Dutu | Aliabad-e Jowhari | Aliabad-e Khvoshablu | Aliabad-e Malek | Aliabad-e Musehli | Aliabad-e Nasir Khani | Aliabad-e Olya | Aliabad-e Owkoshi | Aliabad-e Puzeh Rowghan Cheraghi | Aliabad-e Qarchi | Aliabad-e Qoroq | Aliabad-e Salar | Aliabad-e Sar Tang | Aliabad-e Sar Tol | Aliabad-e Seh Tolan | Aliabad-e Shams | Aliabad-e Shur | Aliabad-e Sofla | Aliabad-e Sorkhak | Aliabad-e Zahd Mahmud | Allah Morad Khani | Allahabad | Aminabad | Amir Ayyub | Amir Hajjilu | Amir Salar-e Olya | Amir Salari | Amirabad Kaftar | Amirabad | Amirabad | Amirabad-e Karbalayi Khosrow | Amirabad-e Panjahopanj | Amirabad-e Panjahoshesh | Amirabad-e Sili Zardi | Amlak | Amrabad | Amrabad | Amui | Amui | Anar Mehr | Anarak | Anarak | Anarestan | Anda | Andar | Angakban | Angareh | Anjirak | Anjirband | Anjireh | Anjireh | Anjireh | Anjireh-ye Gowkhast | Anna | Aq Cheshmeh | Aq Jalu | Aqajan-e Tavakkol | Arab Abdi | Arab Chegini | Arab-e Gavmishi | Arabuyeh | Arad | Arad | Arbabi-ye Olya | Arbabi-ye Sofla | Ardakan | Ardali | Ardeshiri-ye Bala | Ardeshiri-ye Sofla | Ardeshiri-ye Vosta | Arg | Arjuyeh | Arsanjan | Arudan-e Olya | Arudan-e Sofla | Arusak | Asadabad | Asadabad | Asadabad-e Lateh Kuh | Asefabad | Aseman Gerd | Asemi | Asfal | Asgarabad | Ashjerd | Ashkam Shur | Ashna | Asiab-e Kereshki | Asir | Aspas | Ataabad | Atabak | Atabakhsh-e Ghani | Avak-e Pain | Avanjan | Aveh | Aviz | Ayas Jan | Ayaz Galu | Ayazabad | Ayur | Azad Khani | Azarbeyglu | Azizabad |

=== B ===
Bab Anar | Bab Ayur | Baba Arab | Baba Gurin | Baba Kamal | Baba Khani | Baba Kuhak | Baba Meydan-e Olya | Baba Meydan-e Sofla | Baba Meydan-e Zirrah | Baba Monir | Baba Salari | Baba Salehi | Babagushi | Babai | Babolbam | Bachan | Badaki | Badaki | Badamak | Badameh | Badamu | Badbar | Badenjan | Bagdaneh | Bagh Avaz | Bagh Dasht | Bagh Safa | Bagh | Bagh | Baghan | Baghan | Baghat-e Qaraval | Baghchaleh | Bagh-e Anarak | Bagh-e Bala | Bagh-e Barus | Bagh-e Doktor Mansur Zahadi | Bagh-e Gar | Bagh-e Hajji Abdol | Bagh-e Kabir | Bagh-e Kazem Filvandi | Bagh-e Khoshrow | Bagh-e Khuni | Bagh-e Manuchehr Kamjunia | Bagh-e Marbut | Bagh-e Masali Nezhad | Bagh-e Masli Nezhad | Bagh-e Molla | Bagh-e Najafabad | Bagh-e Naser Zarghami | Bagh-e Now | Bagh-e Shad | Bagh-e Tir-e Hajjiabad | Baghestan | Baghestan-e Abu ol Hayat | Baghestan-e Kandehi | Bahadorabad | Bahadoran | Bahareh | Bahlu | Bahman | Bahmani | Bahmani | Bahmani | Bahr Ghan | Bahramabad | Bahramabad | Bahramabad | Bajgah | Bajgah | Bajki | Bakaldun-e Gholam Shah | Bakan | Bakar-e Olya | Bakar-e Sofla | Baker | Bakhsh Zirdu | Bakhtajerd | Bakhtiaruyeh | Bakian | Bakur | Bal Bali | Bal Mini | Bala Deh | Bala Kuh | Bala Shahr | Baladeh | Balangan-e Olya | Baleqlu | Baliu | Balkareh | Balmangan | Baluchi | Balumeh | Balut Geru | Balut Jahan | Balutabad | Balutak | Balut-e Asadi | Balyan | Bam Anguri | Bam Badami | Bam-e Gurinja | Banaf | Banak | Banaruiyeh | Banavan | Band Barik | Band Bast-e Bala | Band Bast-e Pain | Band Didegan | Band-e Amir | Band-e Bast | Band-e Now | Baneh Khafrak | Baneh Yekkeh | Banesh | Bani Yekkeh | Banian | Bankastan | Bankuy-e Ashayir Dahaneh Qalehha | Bankuy-e Ashayir Kol Chah | Banuj | Baqerabad | Baqerabad | Baqerabad | Baqerabad | Bar Aftab-e Zirdu | Bar Bid-e Mohammad Qoli | Bar Cheshmeh | Barab | Barah Ruz | Barak | Baramshad | Bard Kharan | Bard Kuh | Bard Qaleh | Bard Tork | Bard Zard | Bardabad | Bardaleh | Bard-e Now | Bardeh Kuyeh | Bardej | Barezabad | Barg-e Tut | Barkeh Abi | Barm Shur-e Olya | Barm Shur-e Sofla | Barmah | Barm-e Jamal | Barm-e Shur | Barm-e Siah | Barreh | Barus | Bas Kutuku | Baseri Aqajan | Baseri Hadi | Bashgan | Bashirabad | Basiran | Bast Bani | Bast Nari | Bastarm-e Cheshmeh Anjir | Bastarm-e Olya | Bastarm-e Otaqi | Bast-e Durah | Bast-e Kheyrabad | Batun | Bavan-e Olya | Bavan-e Sofla | Bavan-e Vosta | Bavarian | Bavarkan | Bayegan | Bayjan | Baz Bachcheh | Bazam-e Ahuchar | Bazm | Bazmak-e Olya | Bazmak-e Sofla | Bazrangan | Behesht Makan | Beheshtabad | Behjan | Behrestan | Behruzabad-e Sofla | Behuyeh | Bekahdan | Belhezar-e Bala | Belhezar-e Pain | Beneger | Benow | Benow | Benugir | Berak | Berayjan | Bereshneh | Bergaki | Berikhun | Beriskan | Beriz | Berkeh | Berkeh-ye Mah Banu | Berkeh-ye Mollai | Berkeh-ye Sefid | Beryanak | Beryu | Besharjan | Beshneh | Beyan | Beyk Inanlu | Beyram | Beytollahi | Beyza | Bezin | Bi Kanda | Biadeh | Bibi Nazkhatun | Bibimohlat | Bid Gerd | Bid Gol | Bid Harakat | Bid Karz | Bid Khal | Bid Mohammadi | Bid Qatar-e Bon Rud | Bid Shahr | Bid Shahrak | Bid Zard | Bid Zard | Bid Zard-e Olya | Bid Zard-e Sofla | Bid Zardi | Bidak | Bidak | Bidal Bacheh | Bid-e Zard | Bidkan | Bigherd | Bikehdan | Bikhak-e Joruq | Bikheh Deraz | Bikhuyeh | Bikuh | Bimi-ye Sofla | Bir | Bisheh Zard | Bisheh Zard | Bisotun-e Bon Rud | Bizdan | Bizjan-e Olya | Bizjan-e Sofla | Bodir | Bokat | Bolaghi | Bolandu | Bolbolak | Boleh Dan | Bolghan | Bon Band | Bon Darreh | Bon Dasht | Bon Jir | Bon Kuyeh | Bon Rud | Bon Zard | Bonab | Bonduiyeh | Boneh Darvazeh | Boneh Raz | Boneh Sur | Boneh-ye Abed | Boneh-ye Dari | Boneh-ye Mirza Ali Akbar | Boneh-ye Seyyed Mohammad Reza | Bonkuy-e Amiri | Bonkuy-e Ashayir Miraki | Bonkuy-e Ashayir Owlad Sani | Bonkuy-e Ashayir Shaban Kareh | Bonkuy-e Bagdali | Bonkuy-e Chahar Boneh Cheh | Bonkuy-e Dangzalu | Bonkuy-e Gholam Hoseynlu | Bonkuy-e Hasanlu | Bonkuy-e Hemmatlu | Bonkuy-e Heydari | Bonkuy-e Heydarlu | Bonkuy-e Jafari | Bonkuy-e Kazemi | Bonkuy-e Khalili | Bonkuy-e Mokhtari | Bonkuy-e Nosrati | Bonkuy-e Qarbani | Bonkuy-e Rahimi | Bonkuy-e Rajabi | Bonkuy-e Sadeqi | Bonkuy-e Shobani | Bonkuy-e Sohrab Khanlu | Bonkuy-e Soleymani | Borazjan | Borgan | Borj Sukhteh-ye Olya | Borj Sukhteh-ye Sofla | Borj-e Delbar | Borj-e Khankaram | Borj-e Seyfollah | Borj-e Seyyed | Boruiyeh | Bosar Jan | Bostaneh | Bozmiyan | Buanak | Buraki | Buraki | Buraki-ye Olya | Buraki-ye Sofla | Burenjan | Burzakan | Bushkan Water Station | Bushkan-e Deylami | Bushkan-e Mirzai | Buzanjan-e Olya | Buzanjan-e Sofla | Buzar

=== C ===
Chaghan | Chah Ali | Chah Anjir | Chah Anjir | Chah Anjir | Chah Anjir-e Barmshur | Chah Anjir-e Bid Karz | Chah Anjir-e Olya | Chah Anjir-e Olya | Chah Anjir-e Sofla | Chah Bid | Chah Bidu | Chah Chah | Chah Chenar | Chah Darva | Chah Deraz | Chah Dimeh | Chah Gach-e Sofla | Chah Gani | Chah Gaz | Chah Gazi | Chah Gazi | Chah Guraki | Chah Kabkan | Chah Kandar | Chah Kandeh | Chah Kur | Chah Mahi | Chah Mahki | Chah Mish | Chah Muri | Chah Nahr | Chah Now-ye Deh Sheykh | Chah Rigi | Chah Sabz | Chah Sabz-e Bahman Khani | Chah Sargahi | Chah Sefid | Chah Sharaf | Chah Sheykh | Chah Shirin | Chah Shuli | Chah Shur | Chah Shur | Chah Shur | Chah Shurak | Chah Shur-e Olya | Chah Shur-e Sofla | Chah Sorkh | Chah Sorkh | Chah Sorkhi | Chah Talkh | Chah Tiz | Chah Tus | Chah Tut | Chah Varz | Chah Zal | Chah Zebar | Chahab | Chahaki | Chahar Bid-e Sartang | Chahar Bisheh | Chahar Borj | Chahar Deh | Chahar Mur | Chahar Qash | Chahar Qash-e Talkhab | Chahar Qashi | Chahar Qollat | Chahar Rah-e Zirrah | Chahar Taq | Chahar Taq | Chahar Taq | Chahar Taq | Chahar Taq | Chahar Taq | Chah-e Agah | Chah-e Amiq | Chah-e Anjir | Chah-e Baneh | Chah-e Chavarz | Chah-e Darbas | Chah-e Doktor | Chah-e Gandeh | Chah-e Gol | Chah-e Kalaleh | Chah-e Khaluha | Chah-e Mari | Chah-e Meskeh | Chah-e Milak | Chah-e Mohammad Hajji | Chah-e Nasru | Chah-e Pahn | Chah-e Pahn | Chah-e Pahn | Chah-e Ramezan | Chah-e Savar Agha | Chah-e Shakari | Chah-e Sharif Khani | Chah-e Shib | Chah-e Shomareh-ye Seh | Chah-e Sorkh | Chah-e Vagazari-ye Shomareh-ye Chahar | Chah-e Vagazari-ye Shomareh-ye Do | Chah-e Vagazari-ye Shomareh-ye Haft | Chah-e Vagazari-ye Shomareh-ye Hasht | Chah-e Vagazari-ye Shomareh-ye Panj | Chah-e Vagazari-ye Shomareh-ye Seh | Chah-e Vagazari-ye Shomareh-ye Shesht | Chah-e Vagazari-ye Shomareh-ye Yek | Chah-e Zendegani | Chahu | Chak Chak | Chak-e Nar | Chal Anjaki | Cham Borreh | Cham Emamzadeh | Cham Espid | Cham Gol | Cham Kangari | Cham Shel | Cham Zeytun | Cham Zeytun-e Eslamabad | Chaman Bid | Chaman-e Bahram | Chaman-e Morvarid | Chamani | Cham-e Chenar | Cham-e Gaz | Cham-e Sohrab Khani | Cham-e Zir | Chamkur | Charchareh | Chasht Khvor | Chedruyeh | Chehel Cheshmeh | Chehel Cheshmeh-ye Koruni | Chek Cheg | Chekak | Chek-e Golabi | Chenar Barg | Chenar Faryab | Chenar Mishavan | Chenar Pakaneh | Chenar Sukhteh | Chenar Sukhteh | Chenar Sukhteh | Chenar Zahedan | Chenar | Chenar | Chenar | Chenar | Chenarak | Chenaran | Chenar-e Sukhteh | Chenaru | Chenaruiyeh | Cheramakan | Cherrun | Cheshivan | Cheshmeh Ab Gol | Cheshmeh Anjir | Cheshmeh Baklu | Cheshmeh Bardi | Cheshmeh Bari | Cheshmeh Boluqu | Cheshmeh Chahi | Cheshmeh Darreh | Cheshmeh Dozdan | Cheshmeh Gol | Cheshmeh Konari | Cheshmeh Qoroq-e Chin | Cheshmeh Rana | Cheshmeh Sardu | Cheshmeh Sefid | Cheshmeh Sefid | Cheshmeh Seyyed Safari | Cheshmeh Shirin | Cheshmeh Shirin | Cheshmeh Sib Coffee Company | Cheshmeh Talkhu | Cheshmeh Zeytun | Cheshmeh-ye Ab Gorazi | Cheshmeh-ye Abgarm | Cheshmeh-ye Sang Band | Cheshmeh-ye Sang Band | Cheshmeh-ye Shirin | Cheshmeh-ye Takht | Cheshmeh-ye Valiabad Vali | Chikan | Chini Integrated Quarry | Chir | Chir | Chiti | Chokhuha | Chur Ab Qalandari | City Industrial Complex

=== D ===
Dadenjan | Dadin-e Olya | Dadin-e Sofla | Dafar | Dahleh | Dalin | Dalkhan | Dalv-e Nazar | Dam Qanat-e Jowngan | Damaneh | Damcheh | Damdari Hay-e Kazerun | Damkan | Damparuri-ye Khezrehl Run | Damqanat | Dangan | Dangez | Danian | Danicheh Kheyr | Daq Ahu | Dar Faraghat Agricultural Institute | Dar ol Mizan | Darab | Darakuyeh | Daranganeh | Daravay Diyu | Darb Qaleh | Darbandan | Darbas | Darb-e Emamzadeh | Darbidu | Dareh | Darenjan | Darenjan-e Lor | Darian | Darju | Darnian | Darreh Ahaki | Darreh Asali | Darreh Bad | Darreh Badu | Darreh Bakhtan | Darreh Garm | Darreh Gol | Darreh Hamyaneh-ye Olya | Darreh Hamyaneh-ye Sofla | Darreh Mal | Darreh Maru | Darreh Marun | Darreh Moradi | Darreh Murdi | Darreh Palangi | Darreh Sefid | Darreh Sefid | Darreh Shur | Darreh Shur-e Bala | Darreh Susan | Darreh-ye Ali Khani | Darreh-ye Salb | Darreh-ye Talkh Rashek | Darva | Darvishabad | Darvishan | Darz | Dasht Bal | Dasht Konar | Dasht | Dashtak | Dashtak | Dashtak-e Olya | Dasht-e Ahmad | Dasht-e Ali | Dasht-e Arzhan | Dasht-e Asad | Dasht-e Azadegan | Dasht-e Barm | Dasht-e Beyza | Dasht-e Dal | Dasht-e Dera Balverdi | Dasht-e Dideh Ban | Dasht-e Gur | Dasht-e Gurki | Dasht-e Hasani-ye Yek | Dasht-e Hey Bu | Dasht-e Kalusi | Dasht-e Kangari | Dasht-e Kangari | Dasht-e Karim | Dasht-e Kenar | Dasht-e Khowrdeh | Dasht-e Lar | Dasht-e Mak | Dasht-e Mil-e Olya | Dasht-e Mil-e Sofla | Dasht-e Murd | Dasht-e Murd | Dasht-e Pirgheyb | Dasht-e Qir | Dasht-e Rais | Dasht-e Rangrizi | Dasht-e Razm-e Musa Arabi | Dasht-e Razm-e Olya | Dasht-e Shahreza | Dasht-e Shur | Dasht-e Soltanabad-e Chahar | Dasht-e Soltanabad-e Do | Dasht-e Soltanabad-e Seh | Dasht-e Soltanabad-e Yek | Dasht-e Taq | Dasht-e Vel | Dashti | Dashtollah | Dast-e Khezr | Dastejeh | Dastjerd | Dastjerd | Date Packing Factory | Davan | Davazdahi | Debir Shadab | Deh Balai Kherqeh | Deh Barin | Deh Barm | Deh Beh | Deh Bid | Deh Bid | Deh Bin | Deh Chah | Deh Chasht | Deh Damcheh | Deh Dashti | Deh Fazel | Deh Fish | Deh Gah | Deh Gah | Deh Gap-e Mahmudi | Deh Gerdu | Deh Kadeh Salami | Deh Kheyr | Deh Kheyr-e Pain | Deh Kohneh | Deh Kohneh | Deh Kohneh | Deh Kohneh-ye Kamaraj | Deh Mian | Deh Mian | Deh Now | Deh Now | Deh Now | Deh Now | Deh Now | Deh Now | Deh Now | Deh Now-e Fazeli | Deh Now-e Khonj | Deh Now-e Sadat-e Bala | Deh Now-e Sadat-e Pain | Deh Now-e Shurab | Deh Now-ye Bahman | Deh Qanun | Deh Rud | Deh Sarv | Deh Sheykh | Deh Sheykh | Deh Shib | Deh Shib-e Mirza Hasani | Deh Vazir | Deh Zir | Deh Zir | Dehak | Dehak | Dehak-e Aliabad | Dehban | Dehbid | Dehdaq | Dehdari | Dehdari-ye Shurab | Deh-e Bala | Deh-e Bala | Deh-e Gardaneh Rangak | Deh-e Khalil | Deh-e Maleku | Deh-e Meydan | Deh-e Pagah | Deh-e Pain | Deh-e Pas Qalat | Deh-e Sardar | Deh-e Ziarat | Dehgah | Dehgah | Dehgah-e Kandehi | Dehkestan | Dehkuyeh | Dehlaleh | Dehmurd | Dehnow Kashkuli | Dehnow Qalandari | Dehnow | Dehnow | Dehnow | Dehnow | Dehnow-e Bushkan | Dehnow-e Chamran | Dehnow-e Enqelab | Dehnow-e Ghuri | Dehnow-e Markazi | Dehnow-e Moqimi | Dehnow-ye Sadat-e Vosta | Dehpagah | Dehqanan | Dehram | Dehu | Dehuiyeh | Dehuiyeh | Dehuyeh | Dehuyeh | Dehuyeh | Deli Amin Nazer | Deli Bik | Delvar-e Kuh Siah | Denjan | Derafsh-e Olya | Derafsh-e Sofla | Deris | Derk Mah Shuri | Dermanehzar | Dermanehzar-e Do | Dermeh | Dezh Gah | Dezhabad | Dideh Banki | Didehban | Dikanak | Dilemi | Dim Zelleh | Dimah Mil Olya | Dimah Mil Sofla | Dimeh Sorkh | Dinakan | Dinbaghan | Dindarlu | Dipun | Do Borji | Do Estakhr | Do Konarun-e Zirdu | Do Kuhak | Do Kuhak | Do Rah | Do Shakh | Dobiran | Dobiran Water Company | Dom Afshan | Donbildan | Dordaneh | Dordaneh | Dorudzan | Dorudzan Dam Water Company | Dorunak | Doshak | Doshman Ziari | Dowbaneh | Dowbaran | Dowdej | Dowdeman | Dowdjabad | Dowlatabad | Dowlatabad | Dowlatabad | Dowlatabad | Dowlatabad | Dowlatabad | Dowlatabad | Dowlatabad | Dowlatabad | Dowlatabad | Dowlatabad | Dowlatabad | Dowlatabad | Dowlatabad | Dowlatabad | Dowlatabad | Dowlatabad | Dowlatabad-e Dasht-e Seh Chah | Dowlatabad-e Qadim-e Yek | Dowsiran | Dowtujahan | Dozdak-e Kuchek | Dozdak-e Olya | Dozdak-e Sofla | Dozdan | Dozdkordak | Duban | Dudej | Dudek-e Olya | Dudek-e Sofla | Dudek-e Vosta | Dudman | Dugan-e Olya | Dugan-e Sofla | Dulab-e Bala | Dulab-e Pain | Dul-e Mahi | Dul-e Mish | Durag-e Atabak | Durag-e Cheshmeh Konari | Durag-e Madineh | Dusrakhan | Dustabad | Duzeh | Duzeh

=== E ===
Ebrahimabad | Ebrahimabad | Ebrahimabad | Efzar | Ehengah | Ehsham | Ekrad | Elyasabad | Elyasabad | Emad Deh | Emadabad | Emamzadeh Ali Akbar | Emamzadeh Ali | Emamzadeh Aqil | Emamzadeh Bazm | Emamzadeh Esmail | Emamzadeh Ganju | Emamzadeh Mohammad | Emamzadeh Monir | Emamzadeh Pir Abu ol Hasan | Emamzadeh Seyyed Hajj Gharib | Emamzadeh Seyyed Mohammad Hoseyn | Emamzadeh Shah Alamdar | Emamzadeh Shah Esmail | Emamzadeh Shah Gharib | Emamzadeh Shah Nur ol Din | Emamzadeh Shir Mard | Emamzadeh Zaher | Emarat | Emarat | Eqbalabad | Eqbalabad | Eqbalabad | Eqlid | Esfaderan | Esfanjan | Esfian | Eshgaft-e Rumeh | Eshkaft | Eshkaftestan | Eshkanan | Eshkanan Communication Station | Eshkeri | Eshkowri | Eslamabad | Eslamabad | Eslamabad | Eslamabad | Eslamabad | Eslamabad | Eslamabad | Eslamabad | Eslamabad | Eslamabad | Eslamabad | Eslamabad | Eslamabad | Eslamabad | Eslamabad | Eslamabad | Eslamabad | Eslamabad | Eslamabad | Eslamabad | Eslamabad | Eslamabad | Eslamabad | Eslamabad-e Chehel Cheshmeh | Eslamabad-e Ghani | Eslamabad-e Javid | Eslamabad-e Tang Shib | Eslamiyeh | Eslamlu Ayili | Esmailabad | Esmailabad | Esmailabad | Esmailabad | Esmailabad | Esmailabad | Esmailabad | Esmailabad | Esmailabad | Esmailabad-e Pain | Espahri | Estahban | Estakhr | Estas | Evaz | Ezzabad | Ezzabad | Ezzahabad

=== F ===
Fadagh | Fadami | Fahlian-e Olya | Fahlian-e Sofla | Fakhr Makan | Fakhrabad | Fakhrabad | Fakhrabad | Fakhrabad | Fal | Falak | Falunak | Faraj Beygi | Farashband | Farhadabad | Fariab | Fars Construction Company | Fars Integrated Meat Factory | Farsijan | Faruq | Faryab | Fasa | Fasa Industrial Workshops | Fathabad | Fathabad | Fathabad | Fathabad | Fathabad | Fathabad | Fathabad | Fathabad | Fathabad-e Deh-e Arab | Fathabad-e Olya | Fathabad-e Sofla | Fathabad-e Sofla | Fazeli | Fazili | Fedashkuyeh | Fenjan | Fereshteh Jan | Feshan | Feshangan | Feshargaz Amplification Station | Feyzabad | Feyzabad | Feyzabad | Fiduyeh | Fijan | Firuzabad Teacher Centre | Firuzabad | Firuzi | Firuzi | Firuzi | Firuzi | Firuzi | Fishvar | Fishvar | Folo Jan | Forud | Fotuhabad | Fotuhabad

=== G ===
Gabdegah | Gach Boru-e Bala | Gach Darvazeh | Gach Mohammad Hasan | Gach Tahmasabi | Gachgaran | Gachi | Gachkharan | Gahluyeh | Gahrab | Gal Gah | Galeh Dani Hajj Askar Jowkar | Galguni | Galkun | Galleh Dar | Galleh Dar | Galleh Dari Gholam Hoseyn-e Malekpur | Galleh Dari Hajj Morady | Galleh Dari Mohammad Nuratbayi | Galleh Dari Tal Puk | Galleh Dari va Gavdari Malbareh | Galleh Zan | Galu Boraq | Galugah | Gang-e Risheh | Ganjehi | Ganjgan | Gar Kud | Gardan Kalat | Gardan Kolah | Gardan Qalat | Gardan-e Tol Bardangan | Gardaneh-ye Jenjan | Gardaneh-ye Kol Hasank | Gareh | Garkushk | Garmabad | Garmanjan | Garmeh | Garmosht | Garow | Garreh Nazerabad | Garrmish-e Naderlu | Gav Bast | Gav Koshak | Gav Piazi | Gav Shakhi | Gavchah | Gavdari-ye Mohammad Qoli Rusta | Gavdari-ye Shamsabad | Gavmishan | Gaz Gavban | Gazdan | Gazdan-e Abbas Abdollah | Gaz-e Kheng | Gazivaz | Gel Berenji | Gelar | Gelileh-ye Javid | Gelkuyeh | Gelumehr | Gerash | Gerazaruyi | Gerdab-e Piazi | Gerdanbeh | Gervan | Gez Boland | Gezak | Ghadirgah | Gharbi | Gharibabad | Gheyb-e Elahi | Ghiasabad | Ghiasabad | Ghiasabad | Ghiasi | Gholamabad | Ghuri | Giahzar | Gikh | Gol Babakan | Gol Gerd | Gol Khun | Gol Makan-e Baseri | Gol Makan-e Qeshlaq | Gol Sorkhi | Goldamcheh | Goldasht-e Olya | Goldasht-e Sofla | Gol-e Kharg | Goleh Dari Mohammad Hoseyn Mohammadi | Goli Kuh | Golijan | Golpa | Golunar | Gombakan | Gonag | Gonbad | Gonbedu | Gonjalu | Gorazi | Gordeh | Gorgana | Gorgdan | Gorgi | Gorizan | Goshnekan | Gowd Ab Ashtar | Gowd Kahluyeh | Gowd Shaneh | Gowd Zagh | Gowd-e Hasan | Gowd-e Kalur | Gowd-e Lir | Gowd-e Zereshk | Gowri | Gowzan | Grain Development Company | Gudarzi | Gugi | Gulf Road Transportation Depot | Gurab Guh | Gurab | Gurab-e Rostam | Gurak | Gur-e Espid | Gur-e Khar | Gurizeneh | Gushti | Guyim | Guyim | Gypsum Mine

=== H ===
Habashabad | Habibabad | Habibabad-e Durag | Hadayiq Culture and Industry | Hadiabad | Hadiabad | Haft Asiab | Haft Dasht-e Olya | Haft Kol | Haft Pareh | Haftavan | Haftjan | Haftkhan | Hajji Tahereh | Hajjiabad | Hajjiabad Integrated Livestock Company | Hajjiabad | Hajjiabad | Hajjiabad | Hajjiabad | Hajjiabad | Hajjiabad | Hajjiabad | Hajjiabad | Hajjiabad | Hajjiabad | Hajjiabad | Hajjiabad | Hajjiabad | Hajjiabad | Hajjiabad-e Ghuri | Hajjiabad-e Korbal | Hajjiabad-e Mallu | Hajjiabad-e Muzi | Hajjiabad-e Pas Kuhak | Hakavan | Hakim Bashi-ye Bala | Hakim Bashi-ye Hoseynabad | Hamaijan Industrial Estate | Hamandeh | Hamashahr | Hamdamabad | Hamidabad | Hamidabad | Hammami | Hamzeh Beygi | Hana | Hangam Cooperative | Hangi-ye Sofla | Happan | Harar-e Kalgah-e Shiraz | Harariz | Harayjan | Harm | Harom | Harun va Sakez | Hasan Aqai | Hasan Khani | Hasanabad | Hasanabad | Hasanabad | Hasanabad | Hasanabad | Hasanabad | Hasanabad | Hasanabad | Hasanabad | Hasanabad | Hasanabad | Hasanabad | Hasanabad | Hasanabad | Hasanabad-e Ab Konar | Hasanabad-e Abu ol Hasani | Hasanabad-e Bam Furd | Hasanabad-e Kamin | Hasanabad-e Kushkak | Hasanabad-e Margemari | Hasanabad-e Olya | Hasanabad-e Padam | Hasanabad-e Qadamgah | Hasanabad-e Sanjarlu | Hasanabad-e Sofla | Hasanabad-e Tall Kamin | Hasan-e Kamali | Hasani Pacher | Hashemabad | Hashemabad | Hashivar Livestock Company | Hashtijan | Hejrat | Helalabad | Hellak | Hemmat | Hemmatabad | Hemmatabad | Heraj | Herbedan | Hesamabad | Hesami | Hesar-e Dashtak | Heshmatabad | Heshmatiyeh | Heydarabad | Heydarabad | Heydarabad | Heydarabad | Heydarabad | Heydarabad | Heydarabad-e Baba Monir | Heydari | Hezar Balut | Hezar Darreh | Hezar | Hirom | Hojjatabad | Hojjatabad-e Kaseh Rud | Honguyeh | Honifaqan | Horgan | Hormud | Hormud-e Mehr Khui | Hormuj | Hoseyn Kutah | Hoseynabad | Hoseynabad | Hoseynabad | Hoseynabad | Hoseynabad | Hoseynabad | Hoseynabad | Hoseynabad | Hoseynabad | Hoseynabad | Hoseynabad | Hoseynabad | Hoseynabad | Hoseynabad | Hoseynabad | Hoseynabad | Hoseynabad | Hoseynabad | Hoseynabad | Hoseynabad | Hoseynabad | Hoseynabad | Hoseynabad | Hoseynabad | Hoseynabad | Hoseynabad | Hoseynabad | Hoseynabad-e Arab Sheybani | Hoseynabad-e Ardeshiri | Hoseynabad-e Barkeh Puz | Hoseynabad-e Dardan | Hoseynabad-e Deylami | Hoseynabad-e Fishtaqeh | Hoseynabad-e Harom | Hoseynabad-e Jadid | Hoseynabad-e Katak | Hoseynabad-e Khan Qoli | Hoseynabad-e Najafabad | Hoseynabad-e Qoroq | Hoseynabad-e Rostam | Hoseynabad-e Sar Tavileh | Hoseynabad-e Sarab | Hoseynabad-e Saravi | Hoseynabad-e Sargar | Hoseynabad-e Surmaq | Hoseynabad-e Tang-e Khomar | Hoseynabad-e Tarman | Hoseynaliabad | Hud | Hunza | Hurbaf | Hurz | Hydrometric Station

=== I ===
Iduyeh | Ij | Ijani | Ilan | Industrial Estate | Industrial Estate | Institute of Agriculture Phases 2 and 3 | Iran Engineerging Company | Izad Khvast-e Basri | Izadkhvast

=== J ===
Jades | Jadir | Jadval-e Now | Jadval-e Torki | Jafar Jen | Jafarabad | Jafarabad | Jafarabad | Jafarabad | Jafarabad | Jafarabad | Jafarabad | Jafarabad | Jafarabad | Jafarabad | Jafarabad | Jafarabad | Jafarabad-e Olya | Jafarabad-e Sofla | Jahadabad | Jahadabad | Jahan Nama | Jahanabad | Jahanabad | Jahanabad | Jahanabad | Jahreh | Jahrom | Jahrom Airport | Jalalabad | Jalalabad | Jalalabad | Jalalabad-e Tavalayi | Jalilabad | Jam Bozorgi | Jamal Beyg | Jamal Kar | Jamalabad | Jamalabad | Jamalabad | Jamalabad | Jamalabad | Jamalabad | Jamali | Jamar Jan | Jamghan | Jamsi | Jangli | Janguyeh | Janiabad | Janiabad | Janiabad | Jannat Shahr | Jaresqan | Jariabad | Jarmosht-e Bala | Jarmosht-e Pain | Jarri | Jashahr | Javadabad | Javadieh | Javadiyeh | Javadiyeh-ye Bugar | Javaliqan | Javanan | Javark | Jaydasht | Jazin | Jelian | Jelyan | Jenjan-e Markazi | Jereh | Jeshnian | Jeshnian | Jevenjan | Jezzeh | Jian | Jian | Jidarzar | Jigardan | Jolow Dar | Jonbed | Jorgheh | Jovinow | Jowhari | Jowkan | Jowkan-e Pain | Jowzar-e Bakesh | Jowzar-e Javid | Jowz-e Kangari | Jowzjan | Jub Khaleh-ye Olya | Jub Khaleh-ye Sofla | Jubal | Junaki | Juy Bazm | Juy Sefid | Juyan | Juyjan | Juyom | Juzaqdan

=== K ===
Kabeh | Kabkabad | Kachuyeh | Kafdehak | Kafeh | Kafr | Kafri | Kaftarak | Kahkaran | Kahkuh | Kahneh | Kahnehbid | Kahnekuyeh | Kahnuiyeh Darz | Kahnuyeh | Kahnuyeh | Kahrizak | Kahtu | Kajai | Kakan | Kakoli | Kal Ghur | Kal Takhteh | Kal | Kalagh Jiru | Kalani | Kalatun | Kalgah Shiraz | Kalgah | Kalgah-e Olya | Kalgah-e Sofla | Kalhor | Kalur Karim | Kamalabad | Kamalabad | Kamalabad | Kamalabad | Kamalabad | Kamalabad | Kamali | Kaman Keshi | Kamar Zard | Kamarabad-e Arnadi | Kamaraj | Kamarlu | Kamfiruz | Kamjan | Kamur Sukhteh | Kan Rud | Kandaran | Kandar-e Abdol Reza | Kandar-e Kolah Boland | Kandar-e Mohammadi | Kandar-e Sheykh | Kandijan | Kangashi | Kankan | Kapar Khani | Kar Ashub | Kar Panbehi | Kar Sorkh | Karadeh | Karai | Karbalai Mohammad Hoseyn | Karbalayi Mohseni | Kareh Tavi | Kargah | Kargah | Kargah-e Mahal Ahdas Shahrak ol Zahra | Karimabad | Karimabad | Karimabad | Karimabad-e Eskandari | Karimabad-e Jadval-e Now | Karimeh | Karishki | Karkuyeh | Karmard | Karmowstaj | Karreh Bas | Karreh Dar | Karrehkan | Karun | Karyan | Karzin | Kasakan | Kasr ol Dasht | Katak | Katak | Kateh Gonbad | Kateh Kareh | Kateh Mian | Kateh | Kateh-ye Khafr-e Olya | Kateh-ye Khafr-e Sofla | Katenan | Katuyeh | Kavar | Kazemabad | Kazemabad | Kazerun | Kazerun Ceramic Tile Company | Kedenj | Kel Konar | Kelakoli | Kelestan | Kelisiun | Kemili | Kenareh | Kenas-e Olya | Kenas-e Sofla | Kerachi | Keradeh | Kerdil | Kereft | Keshavarzi | Key Zarrin | Khabis | Khader | Khaftar | Khakak Arab | Khalaf Tahuneh | Khaledabad | Khaledah | Khalifehha | Khalili | Khalji | Khaljuy | Khalu Mohammad Ali | Khalur | Khan Baghi | Khan Nahr | Khanabad | Khaneh Ket | Khaneh Khamis-e Olya | Khaneh Khamis-e Sofla | Khaneh Zenyan | Khani Ab | Khani Yek | Khaniman | Khanimeh-ye Bala | Khanimeh-ye Pain | Khanjanabad | Kharagan | Kharameh | Kharestan | Kharestan-e Olya | Kharestan-e Sofla | Kharsor | Kharzahreh | Khasht | Khatiri | Khatunak | Khavaran | Kherengan | Kherqeh | Kherreh | Khesht | Kheshti | Khevid Jan | Khevid-e Mobaraki | Kheyrabad | Kheyrabad | Kheyrabad | Kheyrabad | Kheyrabad | Kheyrabad | Kheyrabad | Kheyrabad | Kheyrabad | Kheyrabad | Kheyrabad | Kheyrabad | Kheyrabad | Kheyrabad | Kheyrabad | Kheyrabad | Kheyrabad-e Hajji Ahmad | Kheyrabad-e Koruni | Kheyrabad-e Tulalli | Kheyratabad-e Barkatak | Kheyrgu | Khobreh | Khobriz | Khodaabad | Khodabakhsh-e Zaval | Khodadadi | Khollar | Khonak | Khong-e Taheri | Khonj | Khonj Free Islamic University | Khonjesht | Khonk-e Pir Sabz | Khorasani | Khormai | Khormayak | Khorram Makan | Khorramabad | Khorramabad | Khorrambid Industrial Estate | Khorramzar | Khoruslu | Khoshkabad | Khosrow Shirin | Khosrowabad | Khosuyeh | Khumeh Zar | Khumeh Zar-e Olya | Khumeh Zar-e Sofla | Khun Hajji | Khur Ab | Khur | Khur | Khurgan | Khurnejan | Khushbajan | Khuzi | Khvajeh Jamali | Khvajeh Jamali | Khvajeh Morad | Khvajehi | Khvordeh Darreh | Khvorjan | Khvorkosh | Khvosh Ab | Khvosh Ab | Khvosh Ab | Khvosh Makan | Khvoshabad | Kianabad | Kikomdan | Kimalu | Kodow | Kohneh Borhan | Kohneh Sorkh | Kohneh | Kohneh-ye Jadid | Kola Siah | Komasij | Komehr | Konar Malek | Konardan | Konardan | Konar-e Hajji-ye Shekari | Konar-e Khoshk | Konar-e Ziarat | Konareh | Konareh-ye Rostam | Konarmaktab | Konartakhteh | Kondazi | Konow | Kord Sheykh | Kord Shul | Kord-e Shul | Kordeh Sheykh | Koreh Muchi | Korehi | Korehi | Korezar | Korrehi | Korsiyah | Koruni | Koshku | Koshkuh | Koturi | Kowr Boland | Kowraki | Kowreh | Kud Zuru | Kudian | Kudian | Kudin | Kuh Gari-ye Kheyrabad | Kuh Sabz | Kuh Sefid | Kuhak | Kuhak-e Do | Kuhanjan | Kuh-e Dera | Kuhenjan | Kuhjerd | Kulbakul-e Bozorg | Kulbakul-e Kuchak | Kuluyeh | Kupan | Kupon-e Olya | Kupon-e Sofla | Kupon-e Vosta | Kurak | Kuraki | Kuraki | Kurazag-e Now | Kurdeh | Kurdeh | Kuroshabad | Kusangan | Kushk Sar | Kushk | Kushk | Kushk | Kushkak | Kushkak | Kushkak | Kushk-e Banian | Kushk-e Baqeri | Kushk-e Bidak | Kushk-e Esmailabad | Kushk-e Hasanabad | Kushk-e Hezar | Kushk-e Khalil | Kushk-e Mohammadabad | Kushk-e Mowla | Kushk-e Pas Qalat | Kushk-e Qazi | Kushk-e Sar Tang | Kushk-e Sofla

=== L ===
Lab Eshkan | Lachareh | Laghar | Lagharan | Lah Ab | Lahiji | Laleh Gun | Lamerd | Lapui | Lar Pasta Company | Lar | Lard Khazan | Lashkhareh | Latifi | Lavar Khesht | Lavarestan | Lay Hana | Lay Raz | Lay Zangan | Lay-e Khorrami | Lehqorbani-ye Olya | Lehqorbani-ye Sofla | Leshgun | Lirmanjan | Lirui-ye Sofla | Lohrasb | Loqman Cheshmeh | Lowzu

=== M ===
Macaroni Factory | Macaroni Factory | Madan-e Surameh | Madar Dokhtar | Madar Soleyman | Madavan | Madeh Banan | Madevan | Madkhun | Mah Farrokhan | Mah Kord | Mah Salari | Mahal Ahdas-e Sad Rudbal | Mahall ol Din | Mahalleh-ye Akbari | Maharlu Kohneh | Maharlu Now | Mahdiyeh | Mah-e Firuzan | Mahjan | Mahjanabad | Mahlacheh | Mahmansaray Shomareh-ye Do | Mahmeleh | Mahmudabad | Mahmudabad | Mahmudabad | Mahmudabad | Mahmudabad | Mahmudabad | Mahmudabad | Mahmudabad | Mahmudabad | Mahmudabad | Mahmudabad-e Do Dang | Mahmudabad-e Olya | Mahmudabad-e Olya | Mahmudabad-e Seh Dang | Mahmudabad-e Sofla | Mahmudabad-e Yek Dang | Main | Majdabad | Mal Hajji | Malavan | Malay-e Anbar | Mal-e Ahmadi | Mal-e Mahmud | Malekabad | Malekabad | Malekabad | Malekabad | Malekabad | Malekabad | Malicheh Sheykh | Malicheh | Malyan | Mambalu | Mamu | Mangun | Manian | Mansurabad | Mansurabad | Mansurabad | Mansurabad | Mansurabad | Mansurabad | Mansurabad | Mansurabad | Mansurabad | Mansurabad | Mansurabad-e Olya | Mansurabad-e Sofla | Mansuriyeh | Manuchehr Abbasi | Manuchehri | Maqsudabad | Maqsudabad | Maqsudabad | Maragallu | Marbuyeh | Margan | Marghdari-ye Hajji Hasan Kuh Bar | Marian | Marjanak | Marmeh | Marun | Marvashkan | Marvdasht | Marvdasht Agricultural Centre | Marzu | Masarm-e Olya | Masarm-e Sofla | Mashayekh | Mashayekh | Mashil Bandar-e Do | Mashtan | Masiri | Masumabad | Masumabad | Mayyu | Maz | Mazayjan | Mazayjan | Mazekan | Mazraeh | Mazraeh | Mazraeh-ye Abbasabad-e Morvarid | Mazraeh-ye Abdol Hoseyn Moradi | Mazraeh-ye Abdol Hoseyn Qobadi | Mazraeh-ye Ahmad Manuchehri | Mazraeh-ye Ahsham Molai | Mazraeh-ye Akbar Borhani | Mazraeh-ye Ali Reza Baharlu | Mazraeh-ye Amirabad | Mazraeh-ye Amrollah Panahpur | Mazraeh-ye Amrollah Rezai | Mazraeh-ye Aqa Hoseyn | Mazraeh-ye Asadi | Mazraeh-ye Askar Sheybani | Mazraeh-ye Baba Abdollah | Mazraeh-ye Badabad | Mazraeh-ye Bandubast | Mazraeh-ye Bangalu Zardaval | Mazraeh-ye Baqr Sheybani | Mazraeh-ye Bidestan | Mazraeh-ye Bidu | Mazraeh-ye Chah Dozdan | Mazraeh-ye Chah-e Shur-e Sofla | Mazraeh-ye Chal Kangari | Mazraeh-ye Chari | Mazraeh-ye Deh Dol | Mazraeh-ye Deh-e Dinari | Mazraeh-ye Deli-ye Rangak Rashidi | Mazraeh-ye Diden Now | Mazraeh-ye Dowlatabad | Mazraeh-ye Dulab-e Vasat | Mazraeh-ye Emamzadeh Abdollah | Mazraeh-ye Eslam Sadaqet | Mazraeh-ye Eslamabad | Mazraeh-ye Esmail Esmaili | Mazraeh-ye Fakhrabad | Mazraeh-ye Fakhrabi | Mazraeh-ye Fallahi | Mazraeh-ye Farhadi | Mazraeh-ye Fathabad | Mazraeh-ye Fereydun Puya | Mazraeh-ye Gachi | Mazraeh-ye Galak | Mazraeh-ye Gholam Hoseyn Khan Masumi | Mazraeh-ye Gurki Malekzadeh | Mazraeh-ye Hajjiabad | Mazraeh-ye Hajjiabad | Mazraeh-ye Hamataj Bahbahani | Mazraeh-ye Harunak | Mazraeh-ye Henduyeh | Mazraeh-ye Huzang | Mazraeh-ye Jafarabad | Mazraeh-ye Javadastavar | Mazraeh-ye Jowzar | Mazraeh-ye Karmani | Mazraeh-ye Karmshah Karmi | Mazraeh-ye Katu | Mazraeh-ye Khodadad Sheybani | Mazraeh-ye Khukand | Mazraeh-ye Kurshabad | Mazraeh-ye Lahrasb | Mazraeh-ye Lard Khun | Mazraeh-ye Las | Mazraeh-ye Madan | Mazraeh-ye Maghilan | Mazraeh-ye Mahbati | Mazraeh-ye Mallu | Mazraeh-ye Mehdiabad | Mazraeh-ye Mehdiabad-e Now | Mazraeh-ye Mohammad Abbasi | Mazraeh-ye Mohammad Karam Sharifi | Mazraeh-ye Mohammad Karimi | Mazraeh-ye Mohammad Masumi | Mazraeh-ye Mohammad Mazidi | Mazraeh-ye Mohammad Qobadi | Mazraeh-ye Moruji | Mazraeh-ye Nazem Sur | Mazraeh-ye Nuli | Mazraeh-ye Pahn | Mazraeh-ye Pahna | Mazraeh-ye Palangi | Mazraeh-ye Panj Chah | Mazraeh-ye Parvarsh Mahi | Mazraeh-ye Pater Chakhar | Mazraeh-ye Pir Badam | Mazraeh-ye Posht Kak | Mazraeh-ye Puram Shahadi Anhas | Mazraeh-ye Qanbarabad | Mazraeh-ye Rah Javian | Mazraeh-ye Rahmatabad | Mazraeh-ye Rajab Ali Lahrasabi | Mazraeh-ye Razak | Mazraeh-ye Reza Mohsul | Mazraeh-ye Sadeqabad | Mazraeh-ye Sadeqiyeh | Mazraeh-ye Sang Bar | Mazraeh-ye Sarhadi | Mazraeh-ye Seh Chah Kuh Sorkh | Mazraeh-ye Seh Qanat | Mazraeh-ye Seyf ol Din | Mazraeh-ye Shah Ali | Mazraeh-ye Shah Reza Karmi va Shork | Mazraeh-ye Shah Taj | Mazraeh-ye Shahbazi | Mazraeh-ye Shahid Dast Gheyb | Mazraeh-ye Shekaft Zun | Mazraeh-ye Shirvani va Shorka | Mazraeh-ye Shuru Hajjiabad | Mazraeh-ye Shuru Hoseyni | Mazraeh-ye Talami | Mazraeh-ye Tall Goreh | Mazraeh-ye Tall Roshtan | Mazraeh-ye Tall Sangari | Mazraeh-ye Tall Sangbary | Mazraeh-ye Tarvij Gandam | Mazraeh-ye Tayfeh Galeh Zan | Mazraeh-ye Tayifeh Farhadlu | Mazraeh-ye Tireh Bahi | Mazraeh-ye Vali Mohammad Qohrmani | Mazraeh-ye Yadollah Jafari | Mazraeh-ye Yunes Hamidi | Mazraeh-ye Zeman Rostami | Mazraeh-ye Zeytunak | Mazru | Mehbudi-ye Olya | Mehbudi-ye Sofla | Mehdi Residential Housing | Mehdiabad | Mehdiabad | Mehdiabad | Mehdiabad | Mehdiabad | Mehdiabad | Mehdiabad | Mehdiabad | Mehkuyeh-ye Olya | Mehkuyeh-ye Sofla | Mehmanabad | Mehrabad | Mehrabad | Mehrabad | Mehrabad | Mehrabad | Mehrabad | Mehrabad-e Mandegari | Mehrabad-e Mazidi | Mehrenjan | Mehrenjan | Mehrian | Mehrian | Meleh Galeh | Melleh Kangun | Melleh Khik Andeh | Menaruyeh | Meshkan | Meydan | Meydanak | Meygoli | Meymand | Mezijan | Mian Qaleh | Mian Rud | Miandeh | Mianeh | Mianeh-ye Jenjan | Mianrud | Midjan | Mij | Milatun | Miluyeh | Mina | Mir Hasani | Mir Kheyrollah | Mir Maleki | Mirchakak | Mirchaki | Mirisah | Mirzaali | Mirzamohammadi-ye Bala | Mirzamohammadi-ye Pain | Mishan-e Olya | Mishan-e Sofla | Miyan Deh | Miyaneh-ye Olya | Miyaneh-ye Sofla | Mobarakabad | Mobarakabad | Mobarakabad | Mobarakabad | Mobarakeh | Mobarakeh | Moezzabad-e Gurgir | Moezzabad-e Jaberi | Mogharrab-e Do | Mohammad Qasemi | Mohammad Zeyna | Mohammadabad | Mohammadabad | Mohammadabad | Mohammadabad | Mohammadabad | Mohammadabad | Mohammadabad | Mohammadabad | Mohammadabad | Mohammadabad | Mohammadabad | Mohammadabad-e Sofla | Mohammad-e Olya | Mohemmabad | Mohit Ab | Mohr | Mohsenabad | Moinabad | Moinabad | Mokhtarabad-e Bon Rud | Molaim Soap Factory | Molay-ye Sefid | Molk-e Ali | Molla Arreh | Molla Balut | Mollai | Monj-e Olya | Monj-e Sofla | Moqaberi | Moqarrab-e Yek | Moqbelabad | Moradabad | Moradabad | Moradabad-e Kolah Siah | Moraskhun-e Olya | Moraskhun-e Sofla | Morghan | Morgh-e Bozorg | Morgh-e Kuchak | Morshedi | Morz | Morzian | Moshkan | Moshtagan | Moslemabad | Mowmenabad | Mowr Deraz | Mowruzeh | Mowzar | Mozaffarabad | Mozaffarabad | Mozaffari | Mozaffari | Mozaffari | Multul | Mur Pahn | Muraki | Murchagi | Murdak | Murdak | Murd-e Susani | Murderaz | Murdestan | Murdestan | Murdi | Murekord | Murjan | Murj-e Shahrak | Murkash | Murmir | Mushkan | Musqan

=== N ===
Naameh | Nachar-e Pain | Nakhlestan Tang-e Khour | Nahr-e Hasan | Naimabad | Najafabad | Najafabad | Najafabad | Najafabad | Najafabad | Najafabad | Najafabad | Najafabad-e Sorkhi | Najamabad | Najmabad | Najmabad | Nakhelstan-e Galleh Dar | Nakhelstan-e Mohr | Namak Ruy | Namazgah | Narak | Narak-e Qasemi | Nardeh Shahr | Narenjan-e Jadid | Nargesabad | Nargesi | Nargesi-ye Deli Qayid Shafi | Nargeszar-e Famur | Naripat | Narkuh | Narmun | Naru | Naseh | Naseh Anjireh | Naserabad | Naserabad | Nasirabad | Nasirabad | Nasirabad | Nasirabad | Nasirabad | Nasirabad | Nasrabad | Nasrabad | Nasrabad | Nasrabad | Nasrovan | Navaygan | Navbandi | Nazarabad | Nazarabad | Negarestan Research Station | Negarestan | Nehuyeh | Nematabad | Nematabad | Nematabad | Nematabad | Neqareh Khaneh | Nerman | Neshahr | Neyriz | Neyriz Integrated Quarry | Neza-e Kuchek | Neza-e Olya | Nezamabad | Nezamabad | Nezamabad | Nezamabad | Nezamabad | Nezamabad-e Jadid | Nilgunak | Nilu | Nimdeh | Nivar-e Olya | Nivar-e Sofla | Noh Tan | Nosrat | Nosratabad | Now Bandegan | Now Dad | Now Sanjan | Nowabad | Nowabad | Nowdan | Nowdaran | Nowgak | Nowruzabad | Nowruzan | Nowruzan | Nuhi | Nujin | Nur ol Dini | Nurabad | Nurabad | Nurabad | Nurabad | Nurabad | Nurai-ye Now | Nushk | Nuyeh

=== O ===
Olya-e Khaledabad | Omidiyeh | Orojabad | Owdli Shakestan | Owlad-e Chelku | Ozun Darreh

=== P ===
Pa Qaleh | Paberkeh | Pahlavani | Pahna Pahn | Pahnabeh | Pahnay Behi | Pain Kuh | Pakal | Palangari-ye Kohneh | Palangari-ye Now | Palangi | Panal | Pangaru | Panj Mahall | Panj Shir | Papun-e Olya | Papun-e Sofla | Paqalat | Par Ahu | Par Eshkaft | Par Sefid | Par Zeytun | Parak | Par-e Molla | Par-e Nobar | Parigi | Parishan | Pariu-ye Arab | Parizadlu | Parkbarm | Parsebil | Parzeh | Pas Band | Pas Bol | Pas Kuhak | Pasaki | Pasalari | Pasheh Dan | Paskahak | Paskhan | Patal Rahimi | Patal | Pay Taft Jalil | Pazanuyeh | Pehrest-e Olya | Pehrest-e Sofla | Pehun | Perin | Petrochemical Staff Housing | Petrol Station | Pey Komak | Pich Kuh | Pir Barzgu | Pir Gheyb | Pir Hoseyni | Pir Mur | Pir Sabz Ali | Pirali | Pir-e Morad | Pir-e Sabz | Pireh Sorkh-e Bala | Pireh Sorkh-e Pain | Pirehdan | Pol Khoda Afarin | Pol Murd | Pol Shekasteh | Pol-e Abgineh | Pol-e Fahlian | Pol-e Fasa | Porzi | Posht Par | Posht Pari | Posht-e Par | Posht-e Par-e Soleyman | Pudenak-e Jowngan | Pumping Station Number Two | Puskan | Puzeh Badi | Puzeh-ye Chahar Qash | Puzeh-ye Chaharabi | Puzeh-ye Hezar Qadami |

=== Q ===
Qabaleh-ye Firuzi | Qabr-e Sefid | Qabtar Qoluy-e Olya | Qabtar Qoluy-e Sofla | Qadamabad | Qadaman | Qadamgah | Qadamgah | Qadamgah | Qaderabad | Qaderabad | Qaedan | Qaedi-ye Seh | Qaemiyeh | Qalamdan | Qalamdan-e Vosta | Qalamu | Qalandar Kashteh | Qalat | Qalat | Qalat | Qalat | Qalatak | Qalat-e Godar Boneh | Qalat-e Khvar | Qalat-e Nilu | Qalatuyeh | Qaleh Beyg | Qaleh Biyaban | Qaleh Chogha | Qaleh Chubi | Qaleh Gachi | Qaleh Gar-e Fahlian | Qaleh Gholam Abdollah | Qaleh Karimi | Qaleh Kharabeh | Qaleh Mahmudi | Qaleh Meseh | Qaleh Mozaffary | Qaleh Now | Qaleh Now | Qaleh Now | Qaleh Now | Qaleh Now | Qaleh Now-e Hashivar | Qaleh Now-e Palangari | Qaleh Sang | Qaleh Sangi | Qaleh Sargah | Qaleh Sargodar | Qaleh Sefid | Qaleh Sohrab | Qaleh | Qaleh-e Ali Baba | Qaleh-e Moradi | Qaleh-ye Abadeh | Qaleh-ye Abbasabad | Qaleh-ye Abdollah Beygi | Qaleh-ye Ali | Qaleh-ye Ali | Qaleh-ye Bahman | Qaleh-ye Doktar Omad | Qaleh-ye Esmaili | Qaleh-ye Hajj Zu ol Faqar | Qaleh-ye Hajji Mohammad | Qaleh-ye Juy | Qaleh-ye Kachalha | Qaleh-ye Kaduyeh | Qaleh-ye Karbalai Mohammad Ali | Qaleh-ye Khalili | Qaleh-ye Khvajeh | Qaleh-ye Kohneh-ye Kavar | Qaleh-ye Mashhadi Karim | Qaleh-ye Mir Aqa | Qaleh-ye Mir Hasan | Qaleh-ye Mirza | Qaleh-ye Mirzai | Qaleh-ye Mirzai | Qaleh-ye Mohammad Ali | Qaleh-ye Molla Hoseyn Ali | Qaleh-ye Murd | Qaleh-ye Narenji | Qaleh-ye Now | Qaleh-ye Now-e Kavar | Qaleh-ye Now-e Mozaffari | Qaleh-ye Piru | Qaleh-ye Sartoli | Qaleh-ye Seyyed | Qaleh-ye Seyyed | Qaleh-ye Shahpur Khani | Qaleh-ye Tiskhani | Qaleyni | Qanamabad | Qanat Bagh | Qanat Ebrahim | Qanat Sorkh | Qanat | Qanat-e Malek | Qanat-e Now | Qanat-e Sur | Qanbari | Qandil | Qandilak | Qannat | Qarah Aqaj Sand Quarry | Qarah Bolagh | Qarah Darreh | Qarah Gozlu | Qarah Hoseyni | Qarah Kenar | Qarah Qayah | Qardashabad | Qareh Gol-e Olya | Qareh Gol-e Sofla | Qasemabad | Qasemabad | Qasemabad | Qasemabad | Qasemabad | Qasemabad-e Bikheh Deraz | Qasemabad-e Olya | Qasemabad-e Sarui | Qasemabad-e Sofla | Qashm Qavi | Qasr-e Ahmad | Qasr-e Ali | Qasr-e Asem | Qasr-e Jamal | Qasr-e Khalil | Qasr-e Molla | Qasr-e Qomsheh | Qasr-e Sasan | Qasr-e Yaqub | Qatar Aghaj | Qatar Boneh | Qatruyeh | Qavamabad | Qavamabad | Qavamabad-e Chichaklu | Qavamcheh | Qayqalu | Qaziabad | Qazian-e Olya | Qazian-e Sofla | Qerrekhlu | Qeshlaq | Qeshlaq | Qeshlaq-e Anjireh | Qezmazari | Qir | Qods Azad Cooperative | Qomabad | Qorban Lak | Qorbanabad | Qoroq-e Qavamcheh | Qosira | Qotbabad | Quch Khvos | Quri |

=== R ===
Rafiabad | Rah Shahi | Rahgan | Rahimabad | Rahimabad | Rahimabad | Rahimabad-e Kamin | Rahmatabad | Rahmatabad | Rahmatabad | Rahmatabad | Rahmatabad | Rahmatabad | Rahnuyeh | Rais Yahya | Rambeh | Ramjerd | Ramjerdi | Rashidabad | Rashidabad | Rashk-e Olya | Rashk-e Sofla | Rashmijan | Rashnabad | Razag | Razianeh Kari | Razmanjan | Rejaabad | Rejalu | Remijan | Reykan | Rezaabad Juchin | Rezaabad | Rezaabad | Richi | Rigan | Rijan | Rimur Elias | Rimur Sharif | Rizakan | Robat | Robatak | Rohani | Roknabad | Roknabad | Roknabad | Romeghan | Ronjeku | Rostamabad | Rostaq | Rotating Machine Company | Ru Darya | Rubahqan | Rud Rezak | Rud Shir-e Olya | Rud Shir-e Ziranbuh | Rudak | Rudaki | Rudbal | Rudbal | Rugir-e Hajji Mohammad Taqi | Rugir-e Hasani | Rugir-e Qaleh Hajji | Rugir-e Taj Amiri | Runiz | Runiz-e Sofla | Rustai-ye Shahid Bahonar | Rustai-ye Taleqani | Ruz Badan | Ruzian

=== S ===
Saadat Shahr | Saadatabad | Saadatabad | Saadatabad | Saadatabad | Saadatabad | Saadatabad | Saadatabad | Saadatabad | Saadatabad-e Molla Hoseyni | Saadatabad-e Olya | Saadatabad-e Sofla | Saadatabad-e Vasat | Saady Gardens and Farms | Sabakhi | Sabonah | Sabuk | Sabzabad | Sabzabad | Sabzuiyeh | Sabzuyeh | Sachun | Sadatabad | Sadatabad | Sadeh | Sadeqabad | Sadeqabad | Sadeqabad | Sadeqabad | Sadeqabad | Sadeqabad | Sadeqabad-e Lachari | Sadereh | Sadrabad | Sadrabad | Safar Beyk | Safarabad | Safashahr | Safiabad | Saghadeh | Saghuyeh | Sahlabad | Sahlabad | Sahlabad | Sahlabad | Sahlabad | Sahlabad-e Sorush | Sahra Sefid | Sahrarud | Sahray-e Bid | Sahray-e Bugal | Sahray-e Nimeh | Sahuk | Sakadeh | Sakhteman ol Khas | Sakhteman-e Baseri | Sakhteman-e Hajj Parviz | Sakhteman-e Hajji Soleyman | Sakhteman-e Kamar | Sakhteman-e Khunriz | Sakhteman-e Mansur | Sakhteman-e Qanbari | Sakhteman-e Rayisi | Sakhteman-e Shokarollah | Salamatabad | Salamatabad | Salari | Salbiz | Salehabad | Salehabad | Salehabad | Salmanabad | Salu | Samadabad | Samak | Samang | Samangan | Sang Kar | Sangar | Sangar | Sangar-e Olya | Sangar-e Sofla | Sangbor | Sang-e Charak | Sang-e Sefid | Sang-e Sefid | Sang-e Zur | Sanjanak | Saqqaabad | Saqqavan | Sar Ab-e Gojestan | Sar Asiab-e Bala | Sar Asiab-e Pain | Sar Bast | Sar Bast | Sar Bisheh | Sar Cheshmeh | Sar Dasht | Sar Gar | Sar Mala | Sar Mashhad | Sar Molki-ye Qanat-e Now | Sar Mur | Sar Qanat | Sar Rud | Sar Tang | Sar Tang-e Bala | Sar Tang-e Kuchak | Sar Taveh-ye Midjan | Sar Tol-e Dowlatabad | Sar Tom | Sarab Rud | Sarabad | Sarab-e Bahram | Sarab-e Siah | Saran-e Bala | Saran-e Pain | Sarbal | Sarchah | Sardab | Sardkhaneh-ye Baradaran Padram | Sar-e Sal | Sarenjelak | Sargah | Sarkerm | Sarqanat | Sartang-e Bozorg | Sarv Nokhvodi | Sarvak | Sarvandan | Sarvegar | Sarvestan | Sarvestan | Sarvu | Sarvuiyeh | Savar-e Gheyb | Sayeban | Sedeh | Sedeh | Sedeh | Seh Chah | Seh Chah | Seh Chah | Seh Chah | Seh Darreh | Seh Darreh | Seh Konj | Seh Talan | Seh Talan | Seh Tolan | Seh Tonbak | Sehqalat | Sehtolan | Semengi | Senan | Senjed Gol | Sepidan Flour Mill | Serizjan-e Namdi | Servan | Sevenj | Sevis | Seyfabad | Seyfabad | Seyfabad | Seyfabad | Seyl Band | Seyyed Abdollah | Seyyed Ahmadi | Seyyed Hashemi | Seyyed Hoseyn | Seyyed Hoseyn | Seyyed Mohammad | Seyyed Sharif Shahada | Seyyedabad | Seyyedan | Shabakeh-ye Bon Dasht | Shadkam | Shaghun | Shaghun | Shah Abu ol Fath | Shah Abu Zakaria | Shah Bahram | Shah Bahrami | Shah Galdi | Shah Gheyb | Shah Jahan Ahmad | Shah Marz | Shah Mohammadi | Shah Mohit | Shah Mowmen | Shah Nur ol Din | Shah Qotb ol Din | Shah Qotb ol Din Heydar | Shah Rostam | Shah Taslim-e Olya | Shahababad | Shahabi | Shahbaz Khani | Shah-e Shahidan | Shahi Jan | Shahid Matahari Training Academy | Shahid | Shahidabad | Shahnan | Shahpur Jan | Shahr Ashub | Shahr Meyan | Shahrak ol Mohammad | Shahrak-e Abraj | Shahrak-e Aliabad | Shahrak-e Ardkapan | Shahrak-e Bazargan | Shahrak-e Boneh Kolaghi | Shahrak-e Bostan | Shahrak-e Chah Tala | Shahrak-e Cham Kuku | Shahrak-e Dehnow | Shahrak-e Emam Khomeyni | Shahrak-e Emam Khomeyni | Shahrak-e Emam Sadeq | Shahrak-e Emam | Shahrak-e Emam | Shahrak-e Esteqlal | Shahrak-e Fajr | Shahrak-e Fath ol Mobin | Shahrak-e Gachgaran | Shahrak-e Ghadir | Shahrak-e Ghadir Navaygan | Shahrak-e Golestan | Shahrak-e Gudarz | Shahrak-e Hafez | Shahrak-e Hangam | Shahrak-e Igder | Shahrak-e Isar | Shahrak-e Isar | Shahrak-e Jadid Ardali | Shahrak-e Jahadabad | Shahrak-e Javad ol Aymeh | Shahrak-e Khalilabad | Shahrak-e Kola Siah | Shahrak-e Kondaz | Shahrak-e Mahdavi | Shahrak-e Mahdiyeh | Shahrak-e Makuyeh | Shahrak-e Malekabad | Shahrak-e Muk | Shahrak-e Qalat | Shahrak-e Qotlu | Shahrak-e Roknabad | Shahrak-e Sadara | Shahrak-e Sadra | Shahrak-e Safi Khani | Shahrak-e Sarollah | Shahrak-e Sayeban | Shahrak-e Seyyed Ala ol Din Hoseyn | Shahrak-e Seyyed ol Shohada | Shahrak-e Shahid Bahnar Jadval-e Now | Shahrak-e Shahid Beheshti | Shahrak-e Shahid Dastgheyb | Shahrak-e Shahid Motahhari | Shahrak-e Shahid Rajai | Shahrak-e Shahid Rejai | Shahrak-e Shohada Ashayir | Shahrak-e Shomali | Shahrak-e Taleqani | Shahrak-e Tang-e Hana | Shahrak-e Trafiki | Shahrak-e Vali-ye Asr | Shahrak-e Vali-ye Asr | Shahrak-e Vazireh | Shahrak-e Zanjiran | Shahr-e Khafr | Shahr-e Pir | Shahrenjan | Shahrestan | Shahrestan | Shahriar | Shahzadeh Abu ol Qasem | Shamlu | Shamsabad | Shamsabad | Shamsabad | Shamsabad | Shamsabad-e Borzu | Shamsabad-e Takht | Shamzagh | Sharafabad | Sharafuyeh | Shardeh | Sharqabad | Sharqi | Shastegan | Shatt-e Badam | Shehneh | Shekaft | Shenayez | Sherkat-e Gol Sorkh Meymand | Sherkat-e Pars Gostar | Sherkat-e Shang Shakan-e Rostaq | Shesh Pir | Sheshdeh | Shetvan | Shevergan | Shevid Zar | Sheydan | Sheydan | Sheydanak | Sheykh Abud | Sheykh Aib | Sheykh Amer | Sheykh Mohammad Rezayi | Sheykh Mohammad | Sheykhabad | Sheykhi Zirdu | Sheykhi | Shib Jadval | Shib Tang | Shir Baba | Shir Daneh | Shir Espari | Shir Habib | Shir Khvorosht | Shir Khvoshi-ye Sofla | Shir Mohammadi | Shiraz | Shiraz Industrial Estate | Shiraz Refinery | Shirbim | Shirganji | Shirin | Shirinu | Shirvani | Shokrabad | Sholdan | Showsani | Shul | Shul | Shul | Shulan | Shul-e Bozi | Shul-e Bozorg | Shul-e Sarui | Shur Ab | Shur Junegan | Shurab | Shurabad | Shurab-e Lor | Shurab-e Tork | Shurab-e Zar | Shurjeh | Shurjestan | Shuru Vazireh | Si La | Sibuiyeh | Sigar-e Bala | Simakan | Simiareh | Sir Banu | Sir Yazjan-e Galeh Zan Abu ol Hasan Beygi | Sir Yazjan-e Galeh Zan Mazarai | Sirati | Sirizjan | Sisakhti-ye Sofla | Sisnian | Sistan-e Olya | Sivand | Siyahun | Sobatu | Sofla | Soghad | Soghad | Solbuyeh | Soleymanabad | Soltanabad | Soltanabad | Soltanabad | Soltanabad | Soltanabad-e Koruni | Soltan-e Velayat | Somar Jan | Somghan | Sorkhabad | Sufian | Suleh Bedar | Sur-e Tahmasb | Surian | Surmaq

=== T ===
Tadavan | Tadna | Tafhian | Taft | Taghun | Tahrehdan | Tahuneh | Tahuneh | Tajabad | Tajabad | Takestan-e Sadrabad | Takhtabad | Takht-e Chaman | Takht-e Rud | Takhteh Sang-e Olya | Takhteh Sang-e Sofla | Takhteh | Tal-e Afghani | Tal-e Gar | Tal-e Khaki | Tal-e Sefid | Taleb Beygi | Taleqani | Talkh Ab | Talkh Ab | Talkh Ab-e Valad | Talkhab | Talkhab-e Olya | Talkhab-e Shahi Jan | Talkhab-e Sofla | Tall Anjir | Tall Anjir | Tall Bargah | Tall Beleki | Tall Boland | Tall Gord | Tall Heydari | Tall Kohneh | Tall Korehi-ye Bon Rud | Tall Koshi | Tall Kuhak | Tall Mahtabi | Tall Milak | Tall Nader | Tall Naqareh | Tall Naqareh | Tall Rizi-ye Alivand | Tall Roshtan | Tall Saman | Tall Sarbani | Tall Siah | Tall Soleymani | Tall Zard | Tall-e Abiz | Tall-e Beyza | Tall-e Bidkan | Tall-e Gachi | Tall-e Gav | Tall-e Kushk | Tall-e Mohammad Reza | Tall-e Mollai | Tall-e Rigi | Tall-e Sabz | Tall-e Sefid-e Sofla | Tall-e Shureh | Tall-e Sorkh | Tammaru | Tang Ab | Tang Koreh | Tang Mohr | Tang Qir | Tang Sa | Tang-e Anari | Tang-e Badi-ye Bala | Tang-e Baha ol Dini | Tang-e Boraq | Tang-e Cheh Zarreh | Tang-e Chowgan-e Olya | Tang-e Chowgan-e Olya-ye Kashkuli | Tang-e Chowgan-e Sofla | Tang-e Chowgan-e Sofla-ye Dar Shuri | Tang-e Chowgan-e Vosta | Tang-e Chuk | Tang-e Dehuiyeh | Tang-e Gav | Tang-e Gojestan | Tang-e Kabutari | Tang-e Karam | Tang-e Katuiyeh | Tang-e Khiareh | Tang-e Kish | Tang-e Koleh | Tang-e Kur | Tang-e Mohammad Saleh | Tang-e Monareh | Tang-e Qalangi | Tang-e Riz | Tang-e Rudian | Tang-e Ruin | Tang-e Shur-e Olya | Tang-e Si | Tang-e Tagher | Tang-e Tur | Tang-e Zard | Tangeh Narreh | Tanguyeh-ye Olya | Tanguyeh-ye Sofla | Taq Taq | Taqiabad | Tarab Khani | Tarbor-e Jafari | Tarbor-e Lay Bisheh | Tarbor-e Sadat | Tarman | Tarqideh | Tarreh Dan | Tasak | Tashk | Tashuyeh | Tasuj | Tavakkolabad | Tavakkolabad-e Markazi | Taveh Dashqoli | Taveh Fashang | Tayifeh Michak | Tehrani | Tiab | Tir Afjan | Tirazjan | Tireh Bagh | Tisheh Gari | Titevand | Tizab | Tizabad | Tizdang-e Olya | Tol Polui | Tol Rigi | Tol Zari | Tol-e Bondu | Tol-e Gavmishi | Tol-e Geli | Tol-e Gor-e Hajjiabad | Tol-e Heydari | Tol-e Khandaq-e Olya | Tol-e Khandaq-e Sofla | Tol-e Meshkin | Tol-e Noqareh | Tol-e Pir | Tol-e Semengi | Tol-e Zireh | Toll-e Mallu | Tolombeh Amiq-e Shomareh-ye Yek | Tolombeh Hay-e Eslamabad-e Yek | Tolombeh Hay-e Malusjan | Tolombeh-ye Abbasabad | Tolombeh-ye Abdol Rahim Ravan | Tolombeh-ye Abiyari Zahd Shahr-e Do | Tolombeh-ye Abiyari Zahd Shahr-e Yek | Tolombeh-ye Afrasiyab Babayi | Tolombeh-ye Afshar | Tolombeh-ye Akbar Sadeqi | Tolombeh-ye Akbar Shams | Tolombeh-ye Akhan | Tolombeh-ye Ali Naz Khosrowi | Tolombeh-ye Ali Reza Yarahmadi | Tolombeh-ye Allah Verdi Mohammadi | Tolombeh-ye Amidvar | Tolombeh-ye Aqa Gol | Tolombeh-ye Aqa Mohammad | Tolombeh-ye Arj Yarahmadi | Tolombeh-ye Asghar-e Taqizadeh | Tolombeh-ye Azami | Tolombeh-ye Aziz Ali Nezhadi | Tolombeh-ye Bahram Keyani | Tolombeh-ye Baqeri | Tolombeh-ye Baqeri | Tolombeh-ye Bar Aftab Shirdani | Tolombeh-ye Barani | Tolombeh-ye Basijian | Tolombeh-ye Baziar | Tolombeh-ye Beglar Yarahmadi | Tolombeh-ye Darab-e Posht Kuhi | Tolombeh-ye Emamqoli Khalaj | Tolombeh-ye Fereydun | Tolombeh-ye Gharib Yarahmadi | Tolombeh-ye Gholam Hoseyn Bizheni | Tolombeh-ye Hamzeh Fakhrai | Tolombeh-ye Hasan Ebrahimi | Tolombeh-ye Hasanabad | Tolombeh-ye Hashem Sheybani | Tolombeh-ye Hay Abguiyeh | Tolombeh-ye Haykatabad | Tolombeh-ye Hoseyn Yarahmadi | Tolombeh-ye Iraj Keyani | Tolombeh-ye Jamal Mohammady | Tolombeh-ye Kamali | Tolombeh-ye Karim Yarahmadi | Tolombeh-ye Kazemi | Tolombeh-ye Khosrowi | Tolombeh-ye Kordshuli | Tolombeh-ye Kushesh | Tolombeh-ye Lay Qamand | Tolombeh-ye Masum Hoseyni | Tolombeh-ye Mehdi Qoli Key Manesh | Tolombeh-ye Mohammad Ali Ghiasi | Tolombeh-ye Mohammad Hasan Kashafi | Tolombeh-ye Mohammad Hoseyn Jafari | Tolombeh-ye Mohammad Morad Heydary | Tolombeh-ye Mohandas Liaqat | Tolombeh-ye Morteza Khan | Tolombeh-ye Nad Ali Beygi | Tolombeh-ye Nazeri | Tolombeh-ye Nezam Taheri | Tolombeh-ye Qanbar Ali Ashraf | Tolombeh-ye Rostam | Tolombeh-ye Sadeqi | Tolombeh-ye Salaki | Tolombeh-ye Samad Aqa | Tolombeh-ye Samadabad | Tolombeh-ye Seyyedeh | Tolombeh-ye Seyyedi Khan Saidi | Tolombeh-ye Shahid Mahmud Owtrab | Tolombeh-ye Sharafuiyeh | Tolombeh-ye Siah Chehareh va Shorka | Tolombeh-ye Tahmasb | Tolombeh-ye Yadollah Khalaj | Tolombeh-ye Zahedi | Tom Shuli | Toremeh | Torkan | Training Centre | Tugah-e Qarah Bas | Tujerdi |

=== V ===
Vahdatabad | Vakilabad | Vakilabad | Vakilabad | Valiabad | Valiabad | Valiabad | Valiasr | Validabad | Varak | Varavi | Vardavan | Vaselabad | Vazak-e Moradi | Vazirabad | Vazireh | Vizaran | Vocational Training Centre

=== W ===
Water Distribution Company

=== Y ===
Yaghleh Mazeh | Yahyaabad | Yahyaabad | Yanderanlu | Yaqubabad | Yarj | Yas Chaman | Yaseriyeh | Yek Dangeh | Yitimu | Yord-e Anjir | Yord-e Jamal | Yurd Dasht-e Zalzaleh | Yurdhai-ye Abdol Yusefi | Yurdhai-ye Miraki | Yusefabad | Yusefabad | Yuzdan

=== Z ===
Zafarabad | Zagh | Zahed Mahmud | Zahedshahr | Zakharu-e Bala | Zakherd | Zakian | Zalemi | Zameni | Zanganeh | Zangeneh | Zangeneh-ye Bon Rud | Zangiabad | Zanguiyeh | Zanguyeh | Zar Qalat | Zarak-e Tang Khas | Zarareh | Zarat | Zaravan | Zargaran | Zarjan | Zarqan | Zarqanak | Zarrin Kuyeh | Zarrinabad-e Darreh Shuri | Zaval | Zavali | Zazeh | Zeyn ol Din | Zeyn ol Dini | Zeynabad | Zeynabad | Zeynabad-e Hangam | Zeynabad-e Sangi | Zeynabad-e Zakhru | Zeynalabad | Zeytun | Zeytun | Ziadabad | Ziadabad | Ziadabad | Zighan | Zijerd | Ziqan | Zir Anay-e Olya | Zir Anay-e Sofla | Zir Zard-e Alishahi | Zirab | Zirgar | Zirgar-e Owl Luyi | Zohrababad

== Administratively ==
- Abadeh County
- Arsanjan County
- Bavanat County
- Darab County
- Eqlid County
- Estahban County
- Farashband County
- Fasa County
- Firuzabad County
- Gerash County
- Jahrom County
- Kavar County
- Kazerun County
- Kharameh County
- Khonj County
- Khorrambid County
- Lamerd County
- Larestan County
- Mamasani County
- Marvdasht County
- Mohr County
- Neyriz County
- Pasargad County
- Qir and Karzin County
- Rostam County
- Sarvestan County
- Sepidan County
- Shiraz County
- Zarrin Dasht County
