= Emamzadeh Seyyed Hajj Gharib =

Emamzadeh Seyyed Hajj Gharib امامزاده سيدحاج غريب
- Village
- Country: Iran
- Province: Fars
- County: Mamasani
- Bakhsh: Central
- Rural District: Bakesh-e Do

Population (2006)
  - Total: 82
- Time zone: UTC+3:30 (IRST)
  - Summer (DST): UTC+4:30 (IRDT)

Emamzadeh Seyyed Hajj Gharib (Persian: امامزاده سيدحاج غريب, also Romanized as Emāmzādeh Seyyed Ḩājj Gharīb) is a village in Bakesh-e Do Rural District, in the Central District of Mamasani County, Fars province, Iran. At the 2006 census, its population was 82, in 18 families.
