= Band Barik =

Band Barik بندباريك
- Village
- Location within Iran
- Coordinates: 30°15′17″N 51°29′46″E
- Country: Iran
- Province: Fars
- County: Mamasani
- Bakhsh: Mahvarmilani
- Rural District: Mahur

Population (2006)
  - Total: 58
- Time zone: UTC+3:30 (IRST)
  - Summer (DST): UTC+4:30 (IRDT)

Band Barik (Persian: بندباريك, also Romanized as Band Bārīk) is a village in Mahur Rural District, Mahvarmilani District, Mamasani County, Fars province, Iran. At the 2006 census, its population was 58, in 15 families.
