= Shirbim =

Shirbim شيربيم
- Village
- Location within Iran
- Coordinates: 29°57′25″N 51°29′16″E
- Country: Iran
- Province: Fars
- County: Mamasani
- Bakhsh: Central
- Rural District: Bakesh-e Yek

Population (2006)
  - Total: 262
- Time zone: UTC+3:30 (IRST)
  - Summer (DST): UTC+4:30 (IRDT)

Shirbim (Persian: شيربيم, also Romanized as Shīrbīm and Shīr-i-Bīm) is a village in Bakesh-e Yek Rural District, in the Central District of Mamasani County, Fars province, Iran. At the 2006 census, its population was 262, in 66 families.
