= Darreh-ye Talkh Rashek =

Darreh-ye Talkh Rashek دره تلخ راشك
- Village
- Country: Iran
- Province: Fars
- County: Mamasani
- Bakhsh: Doshman Ziari
- Rural District: Doshman Ziari

Population (2006)
  - Total: 39
- Time zone: UTC+3:30 (IRST)
  - Summer (DST): UTC+4:30 (IRDT)

Darreh-ye Talkh Rashek (Persian: دره تلخ راشك, also Romanized as Darreh-ye Talkh Rāshek) is a village in Doshman Ziari Rural District, Doshman Ziari District, Mamasani County, Fars province, Iran. At the 2006 census, its population was 39, in 9 families.
