= Dilemi =

Dilemi ديلمي
- Village
- Country: Iran
- Province: Fars
- County: Mamasani
- Bakhsh: Central
- Rural District: Jowzar

Population (2006)
  - Total: 28
- Time zone: UTC+3:30 (IRST)
  - Summer (DST): UTC+4:30 (IRDT)

Dilemi (Persian: ديلمي, also Romanized as Dīlemī) is a village in Jowzar Rural District, in the Central District of Mamasani County, Fars province, Iran. At the 2006 census, its population was 28, in 8 families.
