= Cheshmeh Sardu =

Cheshmeh Sardu چشمه سردو
- Village
- Location within Iran
- Coordinates: 29°57′15″N 51°56′13″E
- Country: Iran
- Province: Fars
- County: Mamasani
- Bakhsh: Doshman Ziari
- Rural District: Mashayekh

Population (2006)
  - Total: 54
- Time zone: UTC+3:30 (IRST)
  - Summer (DST): UTC+4:30 (IRDT)

Cheshmeh Sardu (Persian: چشمه سردو, also Romanized as Cheshmeh Sardū) is a village in Mashayekh Rural District, Doshman Ziari District, Mamasani County, Fars province, Iran. At the 2006 census, its population was 54, in 12 families.
