= Dasht-e Kalusi =

Dasht-e Kalusi دشت كالوسي
- Village
- Country: Iran
- Province: Fars
- County: Mamasani
- Bakhsh: Mahvarmilani
- Rural District: Mahur

Population (2006)
  - Total: 15
- Time zone: UTC+3:30 (IRST)
  - Summer (DST): UTC+4:30 (IRDT)

Dasht-e Kalusi (Persian: دشت كالوسي, also Romanized as Dasht-e Kālūsī) is a village in Mahur Rural District, Mahvarmilani District, Mamasani County, Fars province, Iran. At the 2006 census, its population was 15, in 5 families.
