= Gav Piazi =

Gav Piazi گاوپيازي
- Village
- Location within Iran
- Coordinates: 30°11′15″N 51°35′47″E
- Country: Iran
- Province: Fars
- County: Mamasani
- Bakhsh: Central
- Rural District: Javid-e Mahuri

Population (2006)
  - Total: 656
- Time zone: UTC+3:30 (IRST)
  - Summer (DST): UTC+4:30 (IRDT)

Gav Piazi (Persian: گاوپيازي, also Romanized as Gāv Pīāzī; also known as Bardeyālī) is a village in Javid-e Mahuri Rural District, in the Central District of Mamasani County, Fars province, Iran. At the 2006 census, its population was 656, in 149 families.
