= Tang-e Rudian =

Tang-e Rudian تنگ روديان
- Village
- Location within Iran
- Coordinates: 30°02′12″N 52°01′22″E
- Country: Iran
- Province: Fars
- County: Mamasani
- Bakhsh: Doshman Ziari
- Rural District: Doshman Ziari

Population (2006)
  - Total: 12
- Time zone: UTC+3:30 (IRST)
  - Summer (DST): UTC+4:30 (IRDT)

Tang-e Rudian (Persian: تنگ روديان, also Romanized as Tang-e Rūdīān) is a village in Doshman Ziari Rural District, Doshman Ziari District, Mamasani County, Fars province, Iran. At the 2006 census, its population was 12, in 6 families.
