= Dasht-e Taq =

Dasht-e Taq دشت طاق
- Village
- Location within Iran
- Coordinates: 29°56′10″N 51°25′04″E
- Country: Iran
- Province: Fars
- County: Mamasani
- Bakhsh: Mahvarmilani
- Rural District: Mahur

Population (2006)
  - Total: 24
- Time zone: UTC+3:30 (IRST)
  - Summer (DST): UTC+4:30 (IRDT)

Dasht-e Taq (Persian: دشت طاق, also Romanized as Dasht-e Ţāq) is a village in Mahur Rural District, Mahvarmilani District, Mamasani County, Fars province, Iran. At the 2006 census, its population was 24, in 8 families.
