= Qayqalu =

Qayqalu قايقلو
- Village
- Location within Iran
- Coordinates: 30°02′25″N 51°22′07″E
- Country: Iran
- Province: Fars
- County: Mamasani
- Bakhsh: Mahvarmilani
- Rural District: Mahur

Population (2006)
  - Total: 41
- Time zone: UTC+3:30 (IRST)
  - Summer (DST): UTC+4:30 (IRDT)

Qayqalu (Persian: قايقلو, also Romanized as Qāyqalū; also known as Ghow Ghlū Gūr-e Sefīd, Qūghlū Pā’īn, Qūqlī, Qūqlū, and Qūqlū Gar-e Sefīd) is a village in Mahur Rural District, Mahvarmilani District, Mamasani County, Fars province, Iran. At the 2006 census, its population was 41, in 8 families.
