= Shir Espari =

Shir Espari شيراسپاري
- Village
- Location within Iran
- Coordinates: 30°03′50″N 51°33′05″E
- Country: Iran
- Province: Fars
- County: Mamasani
- Bakhsh: Central
- Rural District: Bakesh-e Yek

Population (2006)
  - Total: 556
- Time zone: UTC+3:30 (IRST)
  - Summer (DST): UTC+4:30 (IRDT)

Shir Espari (Persian: شيراسپاري, also Romanized as Shīr Espārī) is a village in Bakesh-e Yek Rural District, in the Central District of Mamasani County, Fars province, Iran. At the 2006 census, its population was 556, in 127 families.
