= Milatun =

Milatun ميلاتون
- Village
- Location within Iran
- Coordinates: 29°48′04″N 51°11′10″E
- Country: Iran
- Province: Fars
- County: Mamasani
- Bakhsh: Mahvarmilani
- Rural District: Mishan

Population (2006)
  - Total: 81
- Time zone: UTC+3:30 (IRST)
  - Summer (DST): UTC+4:30 (IRDT)

Milatun (Persian: ميلاتون, also Romanized as Mīlātūn; also known as Maḩlātīn, Mahlātūn, and Mehlatūn) is a village in Mishan Rural District, Mahvarmilani District, Mamasani County, Fars province, Iran. At the 2006 census, its population was 81, in 22 families.
