= Pirehdan =

Pirehdan پيره دان
- Village
- Location within Iran
- Coordinates: 30°14′14″N 51°19′09″E
- Country: Iran
- Province: Fars
- County: Mamasani
- Bakhsh: Central
- Rural District: Bakesh-e Do

Population (2006)
  - Total: 305
- Time zone: UTC+3:30 (IRST)
  - Summer (DST): UTC+4:30 (IRDT)

Pirehdan (Persian: پيره دان, also Romanized as Pīrehdān; also known as Pīrdūn) is a village in Bakesh-e Do Rural District, in the Central District of Mamasani County, Fars province, Iran. At the 2006 census, its population was 305, in 61 families.
