= Davazdahi =

Davazdahi دوازدهي
- Village
- Location within Iran
- Coordinates: 30°14′02″N 51°28′24″E
- Country: Iran
- Province: Fars
- County: Mamasani
- Bakhsh: Central
- Rural District: Fahlian

Population (2006)
  - Total: 72
- Time zone: UTC+3:30 (IRST)
  - Summer (DST): UTC+4:30 (IRDT)

Davazdahi (Persian: دوازدهي, also Romanized as Davāzdahī) is a village in Fahlian Rural District, in the Central District of Mamasani County, Fars province, Iran. At the 2006 census, its population was 72, in 18 families.
