= Gelileh-ye Javid =

Gelileh-ye Javid گليله جاويد
- Village
- Location within Iran
- Coordinates: 30°10′09″N 51°50′30″E
- Country: Iran
- Province: Fars
- County: Mamasani
- Bakhsh: Central
- Rural District: Jowzar

Population (2006)
  - Total: 76
- Time zone: UTC+3:30 (IRST)
  - Summer (DST): UTC+4:30 (IRDT)

Gelileh-ye Javid (Persian: گليله جاويد, also Romanized as Gelīleh-ye Jāvīd; also known as Gelīleh) is a village in Jowzar Rural District, in the Central District of Mamasani County, Fars province, Iran. At the 2006 census, its population was 76, in 20 families.
