= Shur Junegan =

Shur Junegan شورجونگان
- Village
- Location within Iran
- Coordinates: 30°01′00″N 51°34′00″E
- Country: Iran
- Province: Fars
- County: Mamasani
- Bakhsh: Central
- Rural District: Bakesh-e Yek

Population (2006)
  - Total: 176
- Time zone: UTC+3:30 (IRST)
  - Summer (DST): UTC+4:30 (IRDT)

Shur Junegan (Persian: شورجونگان, also Romanized as Shūr Jūnegān; also known as Shīvehjū) is a village in Bakesh-e Yek Rural District, in the Central District of Mamasani County, Fars province, Iran. At the 2006 census, its population was 176, in 33 families.
