= Gach Darvazeh =

Gach Darvazeh گچ دروازه
- Village
- Location within Iran
- Coordinates: 30°11′06″N 51°46′47″E
- Country: Iran
- Province: Fars
- County: Mamasani
- Bakhsh: Central
- Rural District: Jowzar

Population (2006)
  - Total: 121
- Time zone: UTC+3:30 (IRST)
  - Summer (DST): UTC+4:30 (IRDT)

Gach Darvazeh (Persian: گچ دروازه, also Romanized as Gach Darvāzeh; also known as Būnbāyūmī) is a village in Jowzar Rural District, in the Central District of Mamasani County, Fars province, Iran. At the 2006 census, its population was 121, in 34 families.
