= Ades Kari-ye Olya =

Ades Kari-ye Olya عدس كاري عليا
- Village
- Country: Iran
- Province: Fars
- County: Mamasani
- Bakhsh: Central
- Rural District: Jowzar

Population (2006)
  - Total: 25
- Time zone: UTC+3:30 (IRST)
  - Summer (DST): UTC+4:30 (IRDT)

Ades Kari-ye Olya (Persian: عدس كاري عليا, also Romanized as 'Ades Kārī-ye 'Olyā) is a village in Jowzar Rural District, in the Central District of Mamasani County, Fars province, Iran. At the 2006 census, its population was 25, in 5 families.
