= Mashtan =

Iranian village

Mashtan مشتان
- Village
- Location within Iran
- Coordinates: 29°33′55″N 51°38′32″E
- Country: Iran
- Province: Fars
- County: Kazerun
- Bakhsh: Central

Population (2016)
  - Total: 3,093
- Time zone: UTC+3:30 (IRST)
  - Summer (DST): UTC+4:30 (IRDT)

Mashtan (Persian: مشتان, also Romanized as Mashtān; also known as Mashtūn) is a village in the Central District of Kazerun County, Fars province, Iran. At the 2016 census, its population was 3,093, in 865 families.
