= Emamzadeh Zaher =

Emamzadeh Zaher امامزاده ظاهر
- Village
- Country: Iran
- Province: Fars
- County: Mamasani
- Bakhsh: Central
- Rural District: Bakesh-e Yek

Population (2006)
  - Total: 40
- Time zone: UTC+3:30 (IRST)
  - Summer (DST): UTC+4:30 (IRDT)

Emamzadeh Zaher (Persian: امامزاده ظاهر, also Romanized as Emāmzādeh Z̧āher) is a village in Bakesh-e Yek Rural District, in the Central District of Mamasani County, Fars province, Iran. At the 2006 census, its population was 40, in 6 families.
