= Cham Shel =

Cham Shel چم شل
- Village
- Location within Iran
- Coordinates: 29°45′49″N 51°11′03″E
- Country: Iran
- Province: Fars
- County: Mamasani
- Bakhsh: Mahvarmilani
- Rural District: Mishan

Population (2006)
  - Total: 25
- Time zone: UTC+3:30 (IRST)
  - Summer (DST): UTC+4:30 (IRDT)

Cham Shel (Persian: چم شل) is a village in Mishan Rural District, Mahvarmilani District, Mamasani County, Fars province, Iran. At the 2006 census, its population was 25, in 7 families.
