= Emamzadeh Shah Nur ol Din =

Emamzadeh Shah Nur ol Din امامزاده شاه نورالدين
- Village
- Location within Iran
- Coordinates: 29°55′37″N 51°31′39″E
- Country: Iran
- Province: Fars
- County: Mamasani
- Bakhsh: Central
- Rural District: Bakesh-e Yek

Population (2006)
  - Total: 24
- Time zone: UTC+3:30 (IRST)
  - Summer (DST): UTC+4:30 (IRDT)

Emamzadeh Shah Nur ol Din (Persian: امامزاده شاه نورالدين, also Romanized as Emāmzādeh Shāh Nūr ol Dīn and Emāmzādeh Shāh Nūr od Dīn) is a village in Bakesh-e Yek Rural District, in the Central District of Mamasani County, Fars province, Iran. At the 2006 census, its population was 24, in 5 families.
