= Darreh-ye Salb =

Darreh-ye Salb دره صلب
- Village
- Location within Iran
- Coordinates: 29°48′44″N 51°14′09″E
- Country: Iran
- Province: Fars
- County: Mamasani
- Bakhsh: Mahvarmilani
- Rural District: Mishan

Population (2006)
  - Total: 74
- Time zone: UTC+3:30 (IRST)
  - Summer (DST): UTC+4:30 (IRDT)

Darreh-ye Salb (Persian: دره صلب, also Romanized as Darreh-ye Şalb and Darreh Salb) is a village in Mishan Rural District, Mahvarmilani District, Mamasani County, Fars province, Iran. At the 2006 census, its population was 74, in 15 families.
