= Cheshmeh Ab Gol =

Cheshmeh Ab Gol چشمه ابگل
- Village
- Location within Iran
- Coordinates: 29°51′40″N 51°58′51″E
- Country: Iran
- Province: Fars
- County: Mamasani
- Bakhsh: Doshman Ziari
- Rural District: Mashayekh

Population (2006)
  - Total: 118
- Time zone: UTC+3:30 (IRST)
  - Summer (DST): UTC+4:30 (IRDT)

Cheshmeh Ab Gol (Persian: چشمه ابگل, also Romanized as Cheshmeh Āb Gol) is a village in Mashayekh Rural District, Doshman Ziari District, Mamasani County, Fars province, Iran. At the 2006 census, its population was 118, in 28 families.
