= Pudenak-e Jowngan =

Pudenak-e Jowngan پودنك جونگان
- Village
- Location within Iran
- Coordinates: 30°01′26″N 51°29′12″E
- Country: Iran
- Province: Fars
- County: Mamasani
- Bakhsh: Central
- Rural District: Bakesh-e Yek

Population (2006)
  - Total: 154
- Time zone: UTC+3:30 (IRST)
  - Summer (DST): UTC+4:30 (IRDT)

Pudenak-e Jowngan (Persian: پودنك جونگان, also Romanized as Pūdenak-e Jowngān; also known as Pīdanak, Pūdana, and Pūdenak) is a village in Bakesh-e Yek Rural District, in the Central District of Mamasani County, Fars province, Iran. At the 2006 census, its population was 154, in 31 families.
