= Darreh Bakhtan =

Darreh Bakhtan دره بختان
- Village
- Location within Iran
- Coordinates: 30°09′52″N 51°42′39″E
- Country: Iran
- Province: Fars
- County: Mamasani
- Bakhsh: Central
- Rural District: Javid-e Mahuri

Population (2006)
  - Total: 34
- Time zone: UTC+3:30 (IRST)
  - Summer (DST): UTC+4:30 (IRDT)

Darreh Bakhtan (Persian: دره بختان, also Romanized as Darreh Bakhtān; also known as Darreh Bakhtā) is a village in Javid-e Mahuri Rural District, in the Central District of Mamasani County, Fars province, Iran. At the 2006 census, its population was 34, in 9 families.
