= Bam Anguri =

Bam Anguri بام انگوري
- Village
- Location within Iran
- Coordinates: 29°43′08″N 51°21′02″E
- Country: Iran
- Province: Fars
- County: Mamasani
- Bakhsh: Mahvarmilani
- Rural District: Mishan

Population (2006)
  - Total: 20
- Time zone: UTC+3:30 (IRST)
  - Summer (DST): UTC+4:30 (IRDT)

Bam Anguri (Persian: بام انگوري, also Romanized as Bām Āngūrī; also known as Bāmāngūr) is a village in Mishan Rural District, Mahvarmilani District, Mamasani County, Fars province, Iran. At the 2006 census, its population was 20, in 5 families.
