= Dinbaghan =

Dinbaghan دين باغان
- Village
- Location within Iran
- Coordinates: 30°19′18″N 51°42′10″E
- Country: Iran
- Province: Fars
- County: Mamasani
- Bakhsh: Central
- Rural District: Jowzar

Population (2006)
  - Total: 115
- Time zone: UTC+3:30 (IRST)
  - Summer (DST): UTC+4:30 (IRDT)

Dinbaghan (Persian: دين باغان, also Romanized as Dīnbāghān; also known as Deym-e Bāghān) is a village in Jowzar Rural District, in the Central District of Mamasani County, Fars province, Iran. At the 2006 census, its population was 115, in 23 families.
