= Kusangan =

Gousengan گوسنگان
- Village
- Location within Iran
- Coordinates: 30°08′34″N 51°39′27″E
- Country: Iran
- Province: Fars
- County: Mamasani
- Bakhsh: Central
- Rural District: Javid-e Mahuri

Population (2006)
  - Total: 287
- Time zone: UTC+3:30 (IRST)
  - Summer (DST): UTC+4:30 (IRDT)

Gousengan (Persian: گوسنگان, also Romanized as Gousengan; also known as Gousengan and Gousengan) is a village in Javid-e Mahuri Rural District, in the Central District of Mamasani County, Fars province, Iran. At the 2006 census, its population was 287, in 61 families.

Gousengan tribe was a tribe of Fahlians who migrated from Fahlian to the heights of Tang Khas Javid during the Qajar rule. In the past, there were a number of people like Hajat Avval, Avaz Ali, Ali Khanjar, Murad Ali, Alireza, Fereydoun Feridouni, Morteza Hajati.
