= Bam-e Gurinja =

Bam-e Gurinja بام گورين جا
- Village
- Location within Iran
- Coordinates: 29°52′35″N 51°25′42″E
- Country: Iran
- Province: Fars
- County: Mamasani
- Bakhsh: Mahvarmilani
- Rural District: Mahur

Population (2006)
  - Total: 12
- Time zone: UTC+3:30 (IRST)
  - Summer (DST): UTC+4:30 (IRDT)

Bam-e Gurinja (Persian: بام گورين جا, also Romanized as Bām-e Gūrīnjā; also known as Bon-e Jarri) is a village in Mahur Rural District, Mahvarmilani District, Mamasani County, Fars province, Iran. At the 2006 census, its population was 12, in 5 families.
