= Dasht-e Dideh Ban =

Dasht-e Dideh Ban دشت ديده بان
- Village
- Location within Iran
- Coordinates: 29°55′56″N 51°48′53″E
- Country: Iran
- Province: Fars
- County: Mamasani
- Bakhsh: Doshman Ziari
- Rural District: Mashayekh

Population (2006)
  - Total: 137
- Time zone: UTC+3:30 (IRST)
  - Summer (DST): UTC+4:30 (IRDT)

Dasht-e Dideh Ban (Persian: دشت ديده بان, also Romanized as Dasht-e Dīdeh Bān) is a village in Mashayekh Rural District, Doshman Ziari District, Mamasani County, Fars province, Iran. At the 2006 census, its population was 137, in 28 families.
