= Sangar-e Olya =

Sangar-e Olya سنگرعليا
- Village
- Location within Iran
- Coordinates: 30°03′16″N 51°32′51″E
- Country: Iran
- Province: Fars
- County: Mamasani
- Bakhsh: Central
- Rural District: Bakesh-e Yek

Population (2006)
  - Total: 71
- Time zone: UTC+3:30 (IRST)
  - Summer (DST): UTC+4:30 (IRDT)

Sangar-e Olya (Persian: سنگرعليا, also Romanized as Sangar-e 'Olyā; also known as Sangar-e Bālā) is a village in Bakesh-e Yek Rural District, in the Central District of Mamasani County, Fars province, Iran. At the 2006 census, its population was 71, in 13 families.
