= Dasht-e Hey Bu =

Dasht-e Hey Bu دشت هيبو
- Village
- Location within Iran
- Coordinates: 29°56′25″N 51°08′15″E
- Country: Iran
- Province: Fars
- County: Mamasani
- Bakhsh: Mahvarmilani
- Rural District: Mishan

Population (2006)
  - Total: 26
- Time zone: UTC+3:30 (IRST)
  - Summer (DST): UTC+4:30 (IRDT)

Dasht-e Hey Bu (Persian: دشت هيبو, also Romanized as Dasht-e Hey Bū) is a village in Mishan Rural District, Mahvarmilani District, Mamasani County, Fars province, Iran. At the 2006 census, its population was 26, in 6 families.
