= Cham Zeytun-e Eslamabad =

Cham Zeytun-e Eslamabad چم زيتون اسلام اباد
- Village
- Location within Iran
- Coordinates: 30°10′52″N 51°41′30″E
- Country: Iran
- Province: Fars
- County: Mamasani
- Bakhsh: Central
- Rural District: Javid-e Mahuri

Population (2006)
  - Total: 37
- Time zone: UTC+3:30 (IRST)
  - Summer (DST): UTC+4:30 (IRDT)

Cham Zeytun-e Eslamabad (Persian: چم زيتون اسلام اباد, also Romanized as Cham Zeytūn-e Eslāmābād; also known as Cham-e Zeytūn and Cham Zeytūn) is a village in Javid-e Mahuri Rural District, in the Central District of Mamasani County, Fars province, Iran. At the 2006 census, its population was 37, in 7 families.
