= Qaedan =

Qaedan قايدان
- Village
- Location within Iran
- Coordinates: 29°56′33″N 51°53′06″E
- Country: Iran
- Province: Fars
- County: Mamasani
- Bakhsh: Doshman Ziari
- Rural District: Mashayekh

Population (2006)
  - Total: 201
- Time zone: UTC+3:30 (IRST)
  - Summer (DST): UTC+4:30 (IRDT)

Qaedan (Persian: قايدان, also Romanized as Qā’edān) is a village in Mashayekh Rural District, Doshman Ziari District, Mamasani County, Fars province, Iran. At the 2006 census, its population was 201, in 48 families.
