= Juyjan =

Juyjan جويجان
- Village
- Location within Iran
- Coordinates: 30°15′45″N 51°40′06″E
- Country: Iran
- Province: Fars
- County: Mamasani
- Bakhsh: Central
- Rural District: Jowzar

Population (2006)
  - Total: 823
- Time zone: UTC+3:30 (IRST)
  - Summer (DST): UTC+4:30 (IRDT)

Juyjan (Persian: جويجان, also Romanized as Jūyjān) is a village in Jowzar Rural District, in the Central District of Mamasani County, Fars province, Iran. At the 2006 census, its population was 823, in 226 families.
