= Bar Bid-e Mohammad Qoli =

Bar Bid-e Mohammad Qoli بربيدمحمدقلي
- Village
- Location within Iran
- Coordinates: 30°13′00″N 51°49′00″E
- Country: Iran
- Province: Fars
- County: Mamasani
- Bakhsh: Central
- Rural District: Jowzar

Population (2006)
  - Total: 104
- Time zone: UTC+3:30 (IRST)
  - Summer (DST): UTC+4:30 (IRDT)

Bar Bid-e Mohammad Qoli (Persian: بربيدمحمدقلي; Romanized as Bar Bīd-e Moḩammad Qolī; and also known as Barebīd, Bareh Bīd or Bar Va Bīd) is a village in Jowzar Rural District in the Central District of Mamasani County of Fars province, Iran. According to the 2006 census, its population was consisted of 104 people in 29 families.
