= Delvar-e Kuh Siah =

Delvar-e Kuh Siah دلواركوه سياه
- Village
- Location within Iran
- Coordinates: 30°03′52″N 51°19′51″E
- Country: Iran
- Province: Fars
- County: Mamasani
- Bakhsh: Mahvarmilani
- Rural District: Mahur

Population (2006)
  - Total: 58
- Time zone: UTC+3:30 (IRST)
  - Summer (DST): UTC+4:30 (IRDT)

Delvar-e Kuh Siah (Persian: دلواركوه سياه, also Romanized as Delvār-e Kūh Sīāh; also known as Dalvār-e Qūch Khvos and Delvār) is a village in Mahur Rural District, Mahvarmilani District, Mamasani County, Fars province, Iran.

== Population ==
At the 2006 census, its population was 58, and 12 families.
