= Moshtagan =

Moshtagan مشتگان
- Village
- Location within Iran
- Coordinates: 30°05′31″N 51°30′03″E
- Country: Iran
- Province: Fars
- County: Mamasani
- Bakhsh: Central
- Rural District: Bakesh-e Yek

Population (2006)
  - Total: 230
- Time zone: UTC+3:30 (IRST)
  - Summer (DST): UTC+4:30 (IRDT)

Moshtagan (Persian: مشتگان, also Romanized as Moshtagān; also known as Mashtakān and Moshtakān) is a village in Bakesh-e Yek Rural District, in the Central District of Mamasani County, Fars province, Iran. At the 2006 census, its population was 230, in 50 families.
