= Deh-e Pas Qalat =

Deh-e Pas Qalat ده پس قلات
- Village
- Location within Iran
- Coordinates: 29°58′27″N 51°34′33″E
- Country: Iran
- Province: Fars
- County: Mamasani
- Bakhsh: Central
- Rural District: Bakesh-e Yek

Population (2006)
  - Total: 39
- Time zone: UTC+3:30 (IRST)
  - Summer (DST): UTC+4:30 (IRDT)

Deh-e Pas Qalat (Persian: ده پس قلات, also Romanized as Deh-e Pas Qalāt and Deh-e Pas-e Qalāt; also known as Pas Qalāt) is a village in Bakesh-e Yek Rural District, in the Central District of Mamasani County, Fars province, Iran. At the 2006 census, its population was 39, in 5 families.
