= Dam Qanat-e Jowngan =

Dam Qanat-e Jowngan دم قنات جونگان
- Village
- Location within Iran
- Coordinates: 30°01′50″N 51°29′33″E
- Country: Iran
- Province: Fars
- County: Mamasani
- Bakhsh: Central
- Rural District: Bakesh-e Yek

Population (2006)
  - Total: 445
- Time zone: UTC+3:30 (IRST)
  - Summer (DST): UTC+4:30 (IRDT)

Dam Qanat-e Jowngan (Persian: دم قنات جونگان, also Romanized as Dam Qanāt-e Jowngān; also known as Dam Qanāt) is a village in Bakesh-e Yek Rural District, in the Central District of Mamasani County, Fars province, Iran. At the 2006 census, its population was 445, in 97 families.
