= Balut Jahan =

Balut Jahan بلوط جهان
- Village
- Location within Iran
- Coordinates: 30°08′32″N 51°39′51″E
- Country: Iran
- Province: Fars
- County: Mamasani
- Bakhsh: Central
- Rural District: Javid-e Mahuri

Population (2006)
  - Total: 69
- Time zone: UTC+3:30 (IRST)
  - Summer (DST): UTC+4:30 (IRDT)

Balut Jahan (Persian: بلوط جهان, also Romanized as Balūţ Jahān; also known as Balūţ Jahāneh) is a village in Javid-e Mahuri Rural District, in the Central District of Mamasani County, Fars province, Iran. At the 2006 census, its population was 69, in 18 families.
