= Bal Mini =

Bal Mini بلميني
- Village
- Location within Iran
- Coordinates: 30°00′48″N 51°56′02″E
- Country: Iran
- Province: Fars
- County: Mamasani
- Bakhsh: Doshman Ziari
- Rural District: Doshman Ziari

Population (2006)
  - Total: 368
- Time zone: UTC+3:30 (IRST)
  - Summer (DST): UTC+4:30 (IRDT)

Bal Mini (Persian: بلميني, also Romanized as Bal Mīnī and Bāl Mīnī; also known as Bāl Mīnī-ye Bālā) is a village in Doshman Ziari Rural District, Doshman Ziari District, Mamasani County, Fars province, Iran. At the 2006 census, its population was 368, in 109 families.
