= Cham Zeytun =

Cham Zeytun چمزيتون
- Village
- Location within Iran
- Coordinates: 30°10′49″N 51°37′49″E
- Country: Iran
- Province: Fars
- County: Mamasani
- Bakhsh: Central
- Rural District: Javid-e Mahuri

Population (2006)
  - Total: 67
- Time zone: UTC+3:30 (IRST)
  - Summer (DST): UTC+4:30 (IRDT)

Cham Zeytun (Persian: چمزيتون, also Romanized as Cham Zeytūn) is a village in Javid-e Mahuri Rural District, in the Central District of Mamasani County, Fars province, Iran. At the 2006 census, its population was 67, in 12 families.
