= Chah Gach-e Sofla =

Chah Gach-e Sofla چاه گچ سفلي
- Village
- Location within Iran
- Coordinates: 29°54′40″N 51°01′16″E
- Country: Iran
- Province: Fars
- County: Mamasani
- Bakhsh: Mahvarmilani
- Rural District: Mishan

Population (2006)
  - Total: 116
- Time zone: UTC+3:30 (IRST)
  - Summer (DST): UTC+4:30 (IRDT)

Chah Gach-e Sofla (Persian: چاه گچ سفلي, also Romanized as Chāh Gach-e Soflá; also known as Chāh Gachī) is a village in Mishan Rural District, Mahvarmilani District, Mamasani County, Fars province, Iran. At the 2006 census, its population was 116, in 25 families.
