= Pol-e Fahlian =

Pol-e Fahlian پل فهليان
- Village
- Location within Iran
- Coordinates: 30°10′37″N 51°31′13″E
- Country: Iran
- Province: Fars
- County: Mamasani
- Bakhsh: Central
- Rural District: Fahlian

Population (2006)
  - Total: 1,149
- Time zone: UTC+3:30 (IRST)
  - Summer (DST): UTC+4:30 (IRDT)

Pol-e Fahlian (Persian: پل فهليان, also Romanized as Pol-e Fahlīān; also known as Gar-e Dodāngeh) is a village in Fahlian Rural District, in the Central District of Mamasani County, Fars province, Iran. At the 2006 census, its population was 1,149, in 277 families.
