= Tisheh Gari =

Tisheh Gari تيشه گري
- Village
- Location within Iran
- Coordinates: 30°04′38″N 51°50′49″E
- Country: Iran
- Province: Fars
- County: Mamasani
- Bakhsh: Doshman Ziari
- Rural District: Doshman Ziari

Population (2006)
  - Total: 91
- Time zone: UTC+3:30 (IRST)
  - Summer (DST): UTC+4:30 (IRDT)

Tisheh Gari (Persian: تيشه گري, also Romanized as Tīsheh Garī; also known as Tīsh Garī) is a village in Doshman Ziari Rural District, Doshman Ziari District, Mamasani County, Fars province, Iran. At the 2006 census, its population was 91, in 26 families.
