= Bid Karz =

Bid Karz بيدكرز
- Village
- Location within Iran
- Coordinates: 29°55′58″N 51°00′46″E
- Country: Iran
- Province: Fars
- County: Mamasani
- Bakhsh: Mahvarmilani
- Rural District: Mishan

Population (2006)
  - Total: 463
- Time zone: UTC+3:30 (IRST)
  - Summer (DST): UTC+4:30 (IRDT)

Bid Karz (Persian: بيدكرز, also Romanized as Bīd Karz; also known as Bīkārez, Bikarz, Bīkasr, and Bīkaz) is a village in Mishan Rural District, Mahvarmilani District, Mamasani County, Fars province, Iran. At the 2006 census, its population was 463, in 103 families.
