= Tall Beleki =

Tall Beleki تل بلكي
- Village
- Location within Iran
- Coordinates: 30°23′10″N 51°39′49″E
- Country: Iran
- Province: Fars
- County: Mamasani
- Bakhsh: Central
- Rural District: Jowzar

Population (2006)
  - Total: 50
- Time zone: UTC+3:30 (IRST)
  - Summer (DST): UTC+4:30 (IRDT)

Tall Beleki (Persian: تل بلكي, also Romanized as Tall Belekī) is a village in Jowzar Rural District, in the Central District of Mamasani County, Fars province, Iran. At the 2006 census, its population was 50, in 12 families.
