= Chah Chenar, Fars =

Chah Chenar چاه چنار
- Village
- Location within Iran
- Coordinates: 30°00′25″N 51°42′40″E
- Country: Iran
- Province: Fars
- County: Mamasani
- Bakhsh: Central
- Rural District: Bakesh-e Yek

Population (2006)
  - Total: 76
- Time zone: UTC+3:30 (IRST)
  - Summer (DST): UTC+4:30 (IRDT)

Chah Chenar (Persian: چاه چنار, also Romanized as Chāh Chenār) is a village in Bakesh-e Yek Rural District, in the Central District of Mamasani County, Fars province, Iran. At the 2006 census, its population was 76, in 21 families.
