= Ab Kaneh =

Ab Kaneh ابكنه
- Village
- Location within Iran
- Coordinates: 27°23′11″N 53°40′09″E
- Country: Iran
- Province: Fars
- County: Larestan
- Bakhsh: Beyram
- Rural District: Bala Deh

Population (2006)
  - Total: 799
- Time zone: UTC+3:30 (IRST)
  - Summer (DST): UTC+4:30 (IRDT)

Ab Kaneh (Persian: ابكنه, also Romanized as Āb Kaneh, Abkaneh, Ābkaneh, and Āb Keneh; also known as Āb Ganeh and Ab Gineh) is a village in Bala Deh Rural District, Beyram District, Larestan County, Fars province, Iran. At the 2006 census, its population was 799, in 143 families.
