= Dasht-e Karim =

Dasht-e Karim دشت كريم
- Village
- Location within Iran
- Coordinates: 30°03′23″N 51°05′30″E
- Country: Iran
- Province: Fars
- County: Mamasani
- Bakhsh: Mahvarmilani
- Rural District: Mahur

Population (2006)
  - Total: 39
- Time zone: UTC+3:30 (IRST)
  - Summer (DST): UTC+4:30 (IRDT)

Dasht-e Karim (Persian: دشت كريم, also Romanized as Dasht-e Karīm; also known as Haft Dasht-e Karīmlū) is a village in Mahur Rural District, Mahvarmilani District, Mamasani County, Fars province, Iran. At the 2006 census, its population was 39, in 11 families.
