= Yaghleh Mazeh =

Yaghleh Mazeh ياغله مازه
- Village
- Location within Iran
- Coordinates: 30°12′52″N 51°12′33″E
- Country: Iran
- Province: Fars
- County: Mamasani
- Bakhsh: Central
- Rural District: Bakesh-e Do

Population (2006)
  - Total: 21
- Time zone: UTC+3:30 (IRST)
  - Summer (DST): UTC+4:30 (IRDT)

Yaghleh Mazeh (Persian: ياغله مازه, also Romanized as Yāghleh Māzeh; also known as Yāqlimāzah) is a village in Bakesh-e Do Rural District, in the Central District of Mamasani County, Fars province, Iran. At the 2006 census, its population was 21, in 7 families.
