= Dul-e Mahi =

Dul-e Mahi دول ماهي
- Village
- Location within Iran
- Coordinates: 29°42′43″N 51°22′57″E
- Country: Iran
- Province: Fars
- County: Mamasani
- Bakhsh: Mahvarmilani
- Rural District: Mishan

Population (2006)
  - Total: 62
- Time zone: UTC+3:30 (IRST)
  - Summer (DST): UTC+4:30 (IRDT)

Dul-e Mahi (Persian: دول ماهي, also Romanized as Dūl-e Māhī and Dūlmāhī) is a village in Mishan Rural District, Mahvarmilani District, Mamasani County, Fars province, Iran. At the 2006 census, its population was 62, in 12 families.
