= Mal-e Ahmadi =

Mal-e Ahmadi مال احمدي
- Village
- Country: Iran
- Province: Fars
- County: Mamasani
- Bakhsh: Mahvarmilani
- Rural District: Mishan

Population (2006)
  - Total: 34
- Time zone: UTC+3:30 (IRST)
  - Summer (DST): UTC+4:30 (IRDT)

Mal-e Ahmadi (Persian: مال احمدي, also Romanized as Māl-e Aḩmadī) is a village in Mishan Rural District, Mahvarmilani District, Mamasani County, Fars province, Iran. At the 2006 census, its population was 34, in 11 families.
