= Haft Kol =

Haft Kol هفت كل
- Village
- Location within Iran
- Coordinates: 30°03′07″N 51°10′14″E
- Country: Iran
- Province: Fars
- County: Mamasani
- Bakhsh: Mahvarmilani
- Rural District: Mahur

Population (2006)
  - Total: 16
- Time zone: UTC+3:30 (IRST)
  - Summer (DST): UTC+4:30 (IRDT)

Haft Kol (Persian: هفت كل; also known as Haft Gol) is a village in Mahur Rural District, Mahvarmilani District, Mamasani County, Fars province, Iran. At the 2006 census, its population was 16, in 4 families.
