= Derafsh-e Olya =

Derafsh-e Olya درفش عليا
- Village
- Location within Iran
- Coordinates: 30°14′32″N 51°41′00″E
- Country: Iran
- Province: Fars
- County: Mamasani
- Bakhsh: Central
- Rural District: Jowzar

Population (2006)
  - Total: 17
- Time zone: UTC+3:30 (IRST)
  - Summer (DST): UTC+4:30 (IRDT)

Derafsh-e Olya (Persian: درفش عليا, also romanized as Derafsh-e 'Olyā; also known as Derafsh-e Bālā) is a village in Jowzar Rural District, in the Central District of Mamasani County, Fars province, Iran. At the 2006 census, its population was 17, in 6 families.
