= Mohemmabad =

Mohemmabad مهم اباد
- Village
- Location within Iran
- Coordinates: 30°03′00″N 50°59′00″E
- Country: Iran
- Province: Fars
- County: Mamasani
- Bakhsh: Mahvarmilani
- Rural District: Mishan

Population (2006)
  - Total: 25
- Time zone: UTC+3:30 (IRST)
  - Summer (DST): UTC+4:30 (IRDT)

Mohemmabad (Persian: مهم اباد, also Romanized as Mohemmābād; also known as Mohemmīābād) is a village in Mishan Rural District, Mahvarmilani District, Mamasani County, Fars province, Iran. At the 2006 census, its population was 25, in 5 families.
