= Bard Kharan =

Bard Kharan بردخران
- Village
- Location within Iran
- Coordinates: 30°08′40″N 51°41′06″E
- Country: Iran
- Province: Fars
- County: Mamasani
- Bakhsh: Central
- Rural District: Javid-e Mahuri

Population (2006)
  - Total: 20
- Time zone: UTC+3:30 (IRST)
  - Summer (DST): UTC+4:30 (IRDT)

Bard Kharan (Persian: بردخران, also Romanized as Bard Kharān; also known as Bard Khvārān and Bar Dokhtarān) is a village in Javid-e Mahuri Rural District, in the Central District of Mamasani County, Fars province, Iran. At the 2006 census, its population was 20, in 5 families.
