= Cham Emamzadeh =

Cham Emamzadeh چم امامزاده
- Village
- Country: Iran
- Province: Fars
- County: Mamasani
- Bakhsh: Doshman Ziari
- Rural District: Doshman Ziari

Population (2006)
  - Total: 14
- Time zone: UTC+3:30 (IRST)
  - Summer (DST): UTC+4:30 (IRDT)

Cham Emamzadeh (Persian: چم امامزاده, also Romanized as Cham Emāmzādeh) is a village in Doshman Ziari Rural District, Doshman Ziari District, Mamasani County, Fars province, Iran. At the 2006 census, its population was 14, in 4 families.
