= Gar Kud =

Garkadou گرکدو
- Village
- Location within Iran
- Coordinates: 30°03′42″N 51°52′42″E
- Country: Iran
- Province: Fars
- County: Mamasani
- Bakhsh: Doshman Ziari
- Rural District: Doshman Ziari

Population (2006)
  - Total: 161
- Time zone: UTC+3:30 (IRST)
  - Summer (DST): UTC+4:30 (IRDT)

Gar Kud (Persian: گرکدو, also Romanized as Garkadou; also known as Bakhshī, Gar-e Kadū, Gar Kadū, and Gar Kodū) is a village in Doshman Ziari Rural District, Doshman Ziari District, Mamasani County, Fars province, Iran. At the 2006 census, its population was 161, in 47 families.
