= Sheykh Aib =

Sheykh Aib شيخ عيب
- Village
- Country: Iran
- Province: Fars
- County: Mamasani
- Bakhsh: Central
- Rural District: Jowzar

Population (2006)
  - Total: 27
- Time zone: UTC+3:30 (IRST)
  - Summer (DST): UTC+4:30 (IRDT)

Sheykh Aib (Persian: شيخ عيب, also Romanized as Sheykh 'Aīb) is a village in Jowzar Rural District, in the Central District of Mamasani County, Fars province, Iran. At the 2006 census, its population was 27, in 7 families.
