= Sangar-e Sofla =

Sangar-e Sofla سنگرسفلي
- Village
- Location within Iran
- Coordinates: 30°03′28″N 51°32′24″E
- Country: Iran
- Province: Fars
- County: Mamasani
- Bakhsh: Central
- Rural District: Bakesh-e Yek

Population (2006)
  - Total: 253
- Time zone: UTC+3:30 (IRST)
  - Summer (DST): UTC+4:30 (IRDT)

Sangar-e Sofla (Persian: سنگرسفلي, also Romanized as Sangar-e Soflá; also known as Sangar, Sangar-e Pā’īn, and Sangar Pā’īn) is a village in Bakesh-e Yek Rural District, in the Central District of Mamasani County, Fars province, Iran. At the 2006 census, its population was 253, in 51 families.
