= Dasht-e Qir =

Dasht-e Qir دشتقير
- Village
- Location within Iran
- Coordinates: 29°56′29″N 50°54′06″E
- Country: Iran
- Province: Fars
- County: Mamasani
- Bakhsh: Mahvarmilani
- Rural District: Mishan

Population (2006)
  - Total: 25
- Time zone: UTC+3:30 (IRST)
  - Summer (DST): UTC+4:30 (IRDT)

Dasht-e Qir (Persian: دشتقير, also Romanized as Dasht-e Qīr) is a village in Mishan Rural District, Mahvarmilani District, Mamasani County, Fars province, Iran. At the 2006 census, its population was 25, in 9 families.
