= Hamzeh Beygi =

Hamzeh Beygi حمزه بيگي
- Village
- Location within Iran
- Coordinates: 29°59′09″N 51°55′23″E
- Country: Iran
- Province: Fars
- County: Mamasani
- Bakhsh: Doshman Ziari
- Rural District: Mashayekh

Population (2006)
  - Total: 220
- Time zone: UTC+3:30 (IRST)
  - Summer (DST): UTC+4:30 (IRDT)

Hamzeh Beygi (Persian: حمزه بيگي, also Romanized as Ḩamzeh Beygī) is a village in Mashayekh Rural District, Doshman Ziari District, Mamasani County, Fars province, Iran. At the 2006 census, its population was 220, in 53 families.
