= Pir Barzgu =

Pir Barzgu پير برزگو
- Village
- Interactive map of Pir Barzgu
- Coordinates: 27°47′44.02″N 53°49′59.92″E
- Country: Iran
- Province: Fars
- County: Evaz
- Bakhsh: Central
- Rural District: Evaz

Population (2016)
  - Total: 11
- Time zone: UTC+3:30 (IRST)

Pir Barzgu (Persian: پير برزگو, also Romanized as Pīr Barzgū) is a village in Evaz County of Fars province, Iran. At the 2006 census, its population was 43, in 8 families. Decreased to 11 people and 5 households in 2016.
