= Par-e Molla =

Par-e Molla پرملا
- Village
- Location within Iran
- Coordinates: 30°01′10″N 51°14′07″E
- Country: Iran
- Province: Fars
- County: Mamasani
- Bakhsh: Mahvarmilani
- Rural District: Mahur

Population (2006)
  - Total: 19
- Time zone: UTC+3:30 (IRST)
  - Summer (DST): UTC+4:30 (IRDT)

Par-e Molla (Persian: پرملا, also Romanized as Par-e Mollā) is a village in Mahur Rural District, Mahvarmilani District, Mamasani County, Fars province, Iran. At the 2006 census, its population was 19, in 5 families.
