= Murmir =

Murmir مورمير
- Village
- Location within Iran
- Coordinates: 30°20′19″N 51°35′03″E
- Country: Iran
- Province: Fars
- County: Mamasani
- Bakhsh: Central
- Rural District: Jowzar

Population (2006)
  - Total: 193
- Time zone: UTC+3:30 (IRST)
  - Summer (DST): UTC+4:30 (IRDT)

Murmir (Persian: مورمير, also Romanized as Mūrmīr) is a village in Jowzar Rural District, in the Central District of Mamasani County, Fars province, Iran. At the 2006 census, its population was 193, in 34 families.
