= Ab Pakhshan =

Ab Pakhshan اب پخشان
- Village
- Location within Iran
- Coordinates: 30°11′13″N 51°35′25″E
- Country: Iran
- Province: Fars
- County: Mamasani
- Bakhsh: Central
- Rural District: Javid-e Mahuri

Population (2006)
  - Total: 755
- Time zone: UTC+3:30 (IRST)
  - Summer (DST): UTC+4:30 (IRDT)

Ab Pakhshan (Persian: اب پخشان, also Romanized as Āb Pakhshān; also known as Āb Pakhshūn) is a village in Javid-e Mahuri Rural District, in the Central District of Mamasani County, Fars province, Iran. At the 2006 census, its population was 755, in 160 families.
