= Dipun =

Village in Iran

Bolandu (Persian،بلندو) is a village in Javid-e Mahuri Rural District, in the Central District of Mamasani County, Fars province, Iran. At the 2006 census, its population was 95, in 23 families.
