= Madar Dokhtar =

Madar Dokhtar مادردختر
- Village
- Location within Iran
- Coordinates: 30°05′13″N 51°25′18″E
- Country: Iran
- Province: Fars
- County: Mamasani
- Bakhsh: Central
- Rural District: Bakesh-e Do

Population (2006)
  - Total: 51
- Time zone: UTC+3:30 (IRST)
  - Summer (DST): UTC+4:30 (IRDT)

Madar Dokhtar (Persian: مادردختر, also Romanized as Mādar Dokhtar) is a village in Bakesh-e Do Rural District, in the Central District of Mamasani County, Fars province, Iran. At the 2006 census, its population was 51, in 11 families.
