= Gach Mohammad Hasan =

Gach Mohammad Hasan گچ محمدحسن
- Village
- Country: Iran
- Province: Fars
- County: Mamasani
- Bakhsh: Mahvarmilani
- Rural District: Mahur

Population (2006)
  - Total: 63
- Time zone: UTC+3:30 (IRST)
  - Summer (DST): UTC+4:30 (IRDT)

Gach Mohammad Hasan (Persian: گچ محمدحسن, also Romanized as Gach Moḩammad Ḩasan) is a village in Mahur Rural District, Mahvarmilani District, Mamasani County, Fars province, Iran. At the 2006 census, its population was 63, in 12 families.
