= Derafsh-e Sofla =

Derafsh-e Sofla درفش سفلي
- Village
- Location within Iran
- Coordinates: 30°14′06″N 51°41′29″E
- Country: Iran
- Province: Fars
- County: Mamasani
- Bakhsh: Central
- Rural District: Jowzar

Population (2006)
  - Total: 114
- Time zone: UTC+3:30 (IRST)
  - Summer (DST): UTC+4:30 (IRDT)

Derafsh-e Sofla (Persian: درفش سفلي, also Romanized as Derafsh-e Soflá; also known as Derafsh-e Pā’īn) is a village in Jowzar Rural District, in the Central District of Mamasani County, Fars province, Iran. At the 2006 census, its population was 114, in 26 families.
