= Gardan Kolah =

Gardan Kolah گردن كلاه
- Village
- Location within Iran
- Coordinates: 29°52′38″N 51°56′59″E
- Country: Iran
- Province: Fars
- County: Mamasani
- Bakhsh: Doshman Ziari
- Rural District: Mashayekh

Population (2016)
  - Total: 16
- Time zone: UTC+3:30 (IRST)
  - Summer (DST): UTC+4:30 (IRDT)

Gardan Kolah (Persian: گردن كلاه, also Romanized as Gardan Kolāh) is a village in Mashayekh Rural District, Doshman Ziari District, Mamasani County, Fars province, Iran. At the 2016 census, its population was 16, in 5 families.
