= Tizdang-e Olya =

Tizdang-e Olya تيزدنگ عليا
- Village
- Location within Iran
- Coordinates: 30°00′34″N 51°19′06″E
- Country: Iran
- Province: Fars
- County: Mamasani
- Bakhsh: Mahvarmilani
- Rural District: Mahur

Population (2006)
  - Total: 23
- Time zone: UTC+3:30 (IRST)
  - Summer (DST): UTC+4:30 (IRDT)

Tizdang-e Olya (Persian: تيزدنگ عليا, also Romanized as Tīzdang-e 'Olyā; also known as Tez Dīng and Tīzdīng-e Bālā) is a village in Mahur Rural District, Mahvarmilani District, Mamasani County, Fars province, Iran. At the 2006 census, its population was 23, in 5 families.
