= Bayegan =

Multinational petrochemicals company

Bayegen
- Area served: Global
- Key people: Ruya Bayegan; Ercument Bayegan
- Website: bayegan.net

Bayegan is a Turkish based petrochemicals company engaged in sourcing, sales, marketing and distribution. They operate in 120 countries across 5 continents.

The company offers a portfolio of polymers, engineering polymers, chemicals, plasticizers and specialty products.

The company’s Chairman is Ercument Bayegan. Burcu Olcay Ustuner is the CEO.

Bayegan has a substantial foothold in the Turkish market as the biggest polymers and chemicals sourcing company in Turkey.

It is involved in a major petrochemicals project to develop a polypropylene plant in Hatay on the south Mediterranean coast of Turkey to reduce the country’s demands on imports. Bayegan was also linked to an earlier plan^{[ii]} to set up a polypropylene plant in Turkey jointly with Saudi Advanced Petrochemical.
