= Par-e Nobar =

Par-e Nobar پرنبار
- Village
- Location within Iran
- Coordinates: 29°56′12″N 51°46′50″E
- Country: Iran
- Province: Fars
- County: Mamasani
- Bakhsh: Doshman Ziari
- Rural District: Mashayekh

Area
  - Total: 16 km^{2} (6.2 sq mi)

Population (2006)
  - Total: 150
  - Density: 9.4/km^{2} (24/sq mi)
- Time zone: UTC+3:30 (IRST)
  - Summer (DST): UTC+4:30 (IRDT)

Par-e Nobar (Persian: پرنبار, also Romanized as Par-e Nobār; also known as Par-e Bonār) is a village in Mashayekh Rural District, Doshman Ziari District, Mamasani County, Fars province, Iran. At the 2006 census, its population was 150, with a total of 32 families.
