= Parsebil =

Parsebil پرسبيل
- Village
- Location within Iran
- Coordinates: 29°56′20″N 51°02′53″E
- Country: Iran
- Province: Fars
- County: Mamasani
- Bakhsh: Mahvarmilani
- Rural District: Mishan

Population (2006)
  - Total: 88
- Time zone: UTC+3:30 (IRST)
  - Summer (DST): UTC+4:30 (IRDT)

Parsebil (Persian: پرسبيل, also Romanized as Parsebīl; also known as Parehsevelli) is a village in Mishan Rural District, Mahvarmilani District, Mamasani County, Fars province, Iran. At the 2006 census, its population was 88, in 13 families.
