= Darreh-ye Ali Khani =

Darreh-ye Ali Khani دره علي خاني
- Village
- Location within Iran
- Coordinates: 29°48′45″N 51°05′47″E
- Country: Iran
- Province: Fars
- County: Mamasani
- Bakhsh: Mahvarmilani
- Rural District: Mishan

Population (2006)
  - Total: 41
- Time zone: UTC+3:30 (IRST)
  - Summer (DST): UTC+4:30 (IRDT)

Darreh-ye Ali Khani (Persian: دره علي خاني, also Romanized as Darreh-ye 'Alī Khānī) is a village in Mishan Rural District, Mahvarmilani District, Mamasani County, Fars province, Iran. At the 2006 census, its population was 41, in 9 families.
