= Anjireh =

Anjireh (Persian: انجيره) may refer to:

- Anjireh-ye Gowkhast, Firuzabad County, Fars Province
- Anjireh, Kavar, Fars Province
- Anjireh, Marvdasht, Fars Province
- Anjireh, Rostam, Fars Province
- Anjireh, Shiraz, Fars Province
- Anjireh, Hamadan
- Anjireh, Hormozgan
- Anjireh, Ilam
- Anjireh-ye Ban Avareh, Kermanshah Province
- Anjireh, Khuzestan
- Anjireh-ye Pain, South Khorasan Province
- Anjireh, Yazd
