= Arbabi =

Arbabi (Persian: اربابي) may refer to:

- Arbabi-ye Olya, Fars Province
- Arbabi-ye Sofla, Fars Province
- Arbabi, Hirmand, Sistan and Baluchestan Province
- Arbabi (Deh-e Arbabi), Hirmand, Sistan and Baluchestan Province
