= Fathabad, Kavar =

Village in Fars province, Iran

Fathabad Persian: فتح اباد
- Village
- Location within Iran
- Coordinates: 29°16′17″N 52°39′11″E
- Country: Iran
- Province: Fars
- County: Kavar
- District: Tasuj
- Rural District: Fathabad

Population (2016)
  - Total: 3,804
- Time zone: UTC+3:30 (IRST)

Fathabad (Persian: فتح اباد) (Note: Also romanized as Fāteḩābād and Fatḩābād; also known as Fat-h’abad Kawar and Fatḩābād-e Kavār) is a village in, and the capital of, Fathabad Rural District of Tasuj District, Kavar County, Fars province, Iran.

== Demographics ==
=== Population ===
At the time of the 2006 National Census, the village's population was 3,415 in 679 households, when it was in Tasuj Rural District of the former Kavar District of Shiraz County. The following census in 2011 counted 3,664 people in 862 households, by which time the district had been separated from the county in the establishment of Kavar County, and the rural district was transferred to the new Tasuj District. Fathabad was transferred to Fathabad Rural District created in the district. The 2016 census measured the population of the village as 3,804 people in 1,032 households. It was the most populous village in its rural district.
