= Tasuj (disambiguation) =

Tasuj (Persian: تسوج - Tasūj) is a city in East Azerbaijan Province, Iran.

Tasuj (Persian: تسوج or طسوج) may also refer to:

- Tasuj, Fars (Persian: طسوج - Ţasūj)
- Tasuj, Kohgiluyeh and Boyer-Ahmad (Persian: طسوج - Ţasūj)
- Tasuj District (Shabestar County) (Persian: بخش طسوج), East Azerbaijan province
- Tasuj District (Kavar County), Fars province
- Tasuj Rural District (disambiguation)
