= Zarat =

Zarat may refer to:

- Zarat Xeybəri, Azerbaijan
- Zarat, Davachi, Azerbaijan
- Zarat, Ismailli, Azerbaijan
- Zarat, Shamakhi, Azerbaijan
- Zarat, Siazan, Azerbaijan
- Zarat, Iran
- Zarat, Tunisia
