= Nowruzan, Kavar =

Village in Fars province, Iran

Nowruzan Persian: نوروزان
- Village
- Location within Iran
- Coordinates: 29°12′16″N 52°44′58″E
- Country: Iran
- Province: Fars
- County: Kavar
- District: Central
- Rural District: Kavar

Population (2016)
  - Total: 2,607
- Time zone: UTC+3:30 (IRST)

Nowruzan (Persian: نوروزان) (Note: Also romanized as Naurūzān and Nowrūzān) is a village in, and the capital of, Kavar Rural District of the Central District of Kavar County, Fars province, Iran. The previous capital of the rural district was the village of Akbarabad, now a city.

== Demographics ==
=== Population ===
At the time of the 2006 National Census, the village's population was 3,332 in 698 households, when it was in the former Kavar District of Shiraz County. The following census in 2011 counted 2,982 people in 774 households, by which time the district had been separated from the county in the establishment of Kavar County. The rural district was transferred to the new Central District. The 2016 census measured the population of the village as 2,607 people in 758 households.
