= Dasht-e Shahreza =

Dasht-e Shahreza دشت شاهرضا
- Village
- Location within Iran
- Coordinates: 29°05′17″N 52°49′27″E
- Country: Iran
- Province: Fars
- County: Kavar
- Bakhsh: Central
- Rural District: Farmeshkhan

Population (2006)
  - Total: 358
- Time zone: UTC+3:30 (IRST)
  - Summer (DST): UTC+4:30 (IRDT)

Dasht-e Shahreza (Persian: دشت شاهرضا, also Romanized as Dasht-e Shāhreẕā; also known as Deshneh-ye Shāh Reẕā) is a village in Farmeshkhan Rural District, in the Central District of Kavar County, Fars province, Iran. At the 2006 census, its population was 358, in 74 families.
