= Hakavan =

Hakavan هكوان
- Village
- Location within Iran
- Coordinates: 29°06′30″N 52°47′56″E
- Country: Iran
- Province: Fars
- County: Kavar
- Bakhsh: Central
- Rural District: Farmeshkhan

Population (2006)
  - Total: 678
- Time zone: UTC+3:30 (IRST)
  - Summer (DST): UTC+4:30 (IRDT)

Hakavan (Persian: هكوان, also Romanized as Hakavān, Hakvān, and Hakwan) is a village in Farmeshkhan Rural District, in the Central District of Kavar County, Fars province, Iran. At the 2006 census, its population was 678, in 138 families.
