= Multul =

Multul مولتول
- Village
- Country: Iran
- Province: Fars
- County: Kavar
- Bakhsh: Central
- Rural District: Farmeshkhan

Population (2006)
  - Total: 141
- Time zone: UTC+3:30 (IRST)
  - Summer (DST): UTC+4:30 (IRDT)

Multul (Persian: مولتول, also Romanized as Mūltūl) is a village in Farmeshkhan Rural District, in the Central District of Kavar County, Fars province, Iran. At the 2006 census, its population was 141, in 33 families.
