= Aliabad, Kavar =

Aliabad علی‌آباد
- Village
- Location within Iran
- Coordinates: 29°08′02″N 52°48′03″E
- Country: Iran
- Province: Fars
- County: Kavar
- Bakhsh: Central
- Rural District: Farmeshkhan

Population (2006)
  - Total: 335
- Time zone: UTC+3:30 (IRST)
  - Summer (DST): UTC+4:30 (IRDT)

Aliabad (Persian: علی‌آباد, also Romanized as 'Alīābād) is a village in Farmeshkhan Rural District, in the Central District of Kavar County, Fars province, Iran. According to the 2006 census, its population was 335, in 69 families.
