= Mowr Deraz, Kavar =

Mowr Deraz موردراز
- Village
- Location within Iran
- Coordinates: 29°08′37″N 52°43′00″E
- Country: Iran
- Province: Fars
- County: Kavar
- Bakhsh: Central
- Rural District: Kavar

Population (2006)
  - Total: 126
- Time zone: UTC+3:30 (IRST)
  - Summer (DST): UTC+4:30 (IRDT)

Mowr Deraz (Persian: موردراز, also Romanized as Mowr Derāz) is a village in Kavar Rural District, in the Central District of Kavar County, Fars province, Iran. At the 2006 census, its population was 126, in 26 families.
