= Qannat, Kavar =

Qannat قنات
- Village
- Location within Iran
- Coordinates: 29°16′25″N 52°31′03″E
- Country: Iran
- Province: Fars
- County: Kavar
- Bakhsh: Central
- Rural District: Tasuj

Population (2006)
  - Total: 608
- Time zone: UTC+3:30 (IRST)
  - Summer (DST): UTC+4:30 (IRDT)

Qannat (Persian: قنات, also Romanized as Qannāt and Qanāt; also known as Ghanat and Qanād) is a village in Tasuj Rural District, in the Central District of Kavar County, Fars province, Iran. At the 2006 census, its population was 608, in 147 families.
