= Mahmudabad-e Do Dang =

Mahmudabad-e Do Dang محموداباددودانگ
- Village
- Location within Iran
- Coordinates: 29°15′11″N 52°43′55″E
- Country: Iran
- Province: Fars
- County: Kavar
- Bakhsh: Central
- Rural District: Tasuj

Population (2006)
  - Total: 1,353
- Time zone: UTC+3:30 (IRST)
  - Summer (DST): UTC+4:30 (IRDT)

Mahmudabad-e Do Dang (Persian: محموداباددودانگ, also Romanized as Maḩmūdābād-e Do Dāng; also known as Maḩmūdābād-e Do Dāngeh) is a village in Tasuj Rural District, in the Central District of Kavar County, Fars province, Iran. At the 2006 census, its population was 1,353, in 268 families.
