= Zijerd =

Zijerd زيجرد
- Village
- Location within Iran
- Coordinates: 29°13′07″N 52°44′26″E
- Country: Iran
- Province: Fars
- County: Kavar
- Bakhsh: Central
- Rural District: Kavar

Population (2006)
  - Total: 389
- Time zone: UTC+3:30 (IRST)
  - Summer (DST): UTC+4:30 (IRDT)

Zijerd (Persian: زيجرد, also Romanized as Zījerd; also known as Zakherd and Zegerd) is a village in Kavar Rural District, in the Central District of Kavar County, Fars province, Iran. At the 2006 census, its population was 389, in 82 families.
