= Khormai =

Khormai خرمايي
- Village
- Location within Iran
- Coordinates: 29°05′24″N 52°48′22″E
- Country: Iran
- Province: Fars
- County: Kavar
- Bakhsh: Central
- Rural District: Farmeshkhan

Population (2006)
  - Total: 116
- Time zone: UTC+3:30 (IRST)
  - Summer (DST): UTC+4:30 (IRDT)

Khormai (Persian: خرمايي, also Romanized as Khormā’ī; also known as Hormā’ī, Khowrmeh, and Khūrmai) is a village in Farmeshkhan Rural District, in the Central District of Kavar County, Fars province, Iran. At the 2006 census, its population was 116, in 28 families.
