= Abadeh Abgarm =

Village in Fars province, Iran

Abadeh Abgarm Persian: اباده ابگرم
- Village
- Location within Iran
- Coordinates: 29°08′08″N 52°51′23″E
- Country: Iran
- Province: Fars
- County: Kavar
- District: Central
- Rural District: Farmeshkan

Population (2016)
  - Total: 1,643
- Time zone: UTC+3:30 (IRST)

Abadeh Abgarm (Persian: اباده ابگرم) (Note: Also romanized as Ābādeh Ābgarm; also known as Ābādeh) is a village in Farmeshkan Rural District of the Central District of Kavar County, Fars province, Iran.

== Demographics ==
=== Population ===
At the time of the 2006 National Census, the village's population was 1,525 in 334 households, when it was in the former Kavar District of Shiraz County. The following census in 2011 counted 1,592 people in 450 households, by which time the district had been separated from the county in the establishment of Kavar County. The rural district was transferred to the new Central District. The 2016 census measured the population of the village as 1,643 people in 513 households. It was the most populous village in its rural district.
