= Dowlatabad, Kavar =

Dowlatabad دولتاباد
- Village
- Location within Iran
- Coordinates: 29°07′13″N 52°50′19″E
- Country: Iran
- Province: Fars
- County: Kavar
- Bakhsh: Central
- Rural District: Farmeshkhan

Population (2006)
  - Total: 622
- Time zone: UTC+3:30 (IRST)
  - Summer (DST): UTC+4:30 (IRDT)

Dowlatabad (Persian: دولتاباد, also Romanized as Dowlatābād; also known as Daulatābād) is a village in Farmeshkhan Rural District, in the Central District of Kavar County, Fars province, Iran. At the 2006 census, its population was 622, in 146 families.
