= Dashtak, Kavar =

Dashtak دشتك
- Village
- Location within Iran
- Coordinates: 29°12′24″N 52°43′34″E
- Country: Iran
- Province: Fars
- County: Kavar
- Bakhsh: Central
- Rural District: Kavar

Population (2006)
  - Total: 1,271
- Time zone: UTC+3:30 (IRST)
  - Summer (DST): UTC+4:30 (IRDT)

Dashtak (Persian: دشتك; also known as Dashtak Kawar) is a village in Kavar Rural District, in the Central District of Kavar County, Fars province, Iran. At the 2006 census, its population was 1,271, in 256 families.
