= Hurbaf =

Hurbaf هورباف
- Village
- Location within Iran
- Coordinates: 29°20′47″N 52°38′30″E
- Country: Iran
- Province: Fars
- County: Kavar
- Bakhsh: Central
- Rural District: Tasuj

Population (2006)
  - Total: 1,292
- Time zone: UTC+3:30 (IRST)
  - Summer (DST): UTC+4:30 (IRDT)

Hurbaf (Persian: هورباف, also Romanized as Hūrbāf) is a village in Tasuj Rural District, in the Central District of Kavar County, Fars province, Iran. At the 2006 census, its population was 1,292, in 254 families.
