= Dehdari, Fars =

Dehdari دهداري
- Village
- Location within Iran
- Coordinates: 29°14′08″N 52°33′08″E
- Country: Iran
- Province: Fars
- County: Kavar
- Bakhsh: Central
- Rural District: Tasuj

Population (2006)
  - Total: 487
- Time zone: UTC+3:30 (IRST)
  - Summer (DST): UTC+4:30 (IRDT)

Dehdari (Persian: دهداري, also Romanized as Dehdārī and Deh Dārī) is a village in Tasuj Rural District, in the Central District of Kavar County, Fars province, Iran. At the 2006 census, its population was 487, in 122 families.
