= Qaleh-ye Now-e Mozaffari =

Qaleh-ye Now-e Mozaffari قلعه نومظفري
- Village
- Location within Iran
- Coordinates: 29°11′53″N 52°47′06″E
- Country: Iran
- Province: Fars
- County: Kavar
- Bakhsh: Central
- Rural District: Kavar

Population (2006)
  - Total: 155
- Time zone: UTC+3:30 (IRST)
  - Summer (DST): UTC+4:30 (IRDT)

Qaleh-ye Now-e Mozaffari (Persian: قلعه نومظفري, also Romanized as Qal‘eh-ye Now-e Moz̧affarī; also known as Qalehnū-e Moz̧afarī) is a village in Kavar Rural District, in the Central District of Kavar County, Fars province, Iran. At the 2006 census, its population was 155, in 37 families.
