= Qaleh-ye Now-e Kavar =

Qaleh-ye Now-e Kavar قلعه نوكوار
- Village
- Location within Iran
- Coordinates: 29°11′31″N 52°43′42″E
- Country: Iran
- Province: Fars
- County: Kavar
- Bakhsh: Central
- Rural District: Kavar

Population (2006)
  - Total: 217
- Time zone: UTC+3:30 (IRST)
  - Summer (DST): UTC+4:30 (IRDT)

Qaleh-ye Now-e Kavar (Persian: قلعه نوكوار, also Romanized as Qal‘eh-ye Now-e Kavār and Qal‘eh Now-e Kavār; also known as Ghal‘eh Now Kawar, Qal‘eh Now, and Qal‘eh-ye Now) is a village in Kavar Rural District, in the Central District of Kavar County, Fars province, Iran. At the 2006 census, its population was 217, in 55 families.
