= Forud =

Forud فرود
- Village
- Location within Iran
- Coordinates: 29°13′45″N 52°44′10″E
- Country: Iran
- Province: Fars
- County: Kavar
- Bakhsh: Central
- Rural District: Kavar

Population (2006)
  - Total: 2,201
- Time zone: UTC+3:30 (IRST)
  - Summer (DST): UTC+4:30 (IRDT)

Forud (Persian: فرود, also Romanized as Forūd) is a village in Kavar Rural District, in the Central District of Kavar County, Fars province, Iran. At the 2006 census, its population was 2,201, in 417 families.
