= Qaleh-ye Mirzai, Kavar =

Qaleh-ye Mirzai قلعه ميرزايي
- Village
- Location within Iran
- Coordinates: 29°13′17″N 52°43′49″E
- Country: Iran
- Province: Fars
- County: Kavar
- Bakhsh: Central
- Rural District: Kavar

Population (2006)
  - Total: 564
- Time zone: UTC+3:30 (IRST)
  - Summer (DST): UTC+4:30 (IRDT)

Qaleh-ye Mirzai (Persian: قلعه ميرزايي, also Romanized as Qal‘eh-ye Mīrzā’ī and Qal‘eh Mīrzā’ī; also known as Ghal‘ehé Mirzai) is a village in Kavar Rural District, in the Central District of Kavar County, Fars province, Iran. At the 2006 census, its population was 564, in 124 families.
