= Mahmudabad-e Seh Dang =

Mahmudabad-e Seh Dang محمودابادسه دانگ
- Village
- Location within Iran
- Coordinates: 29°15′24″N 52°43′11″E
- Country: Iran
- Province: Fars
- County: Kavar
- Bakhsh: Central
- Rural District: Tasuj

Population (2006)
  - Total: 883
- Time zone: UTC+3:30 (IRST)
  - Summer (DST): UTC+4:30 (IRDT)

Mahmudabad-e Seh Dang (Persian: محمودابادسه دانگ, also Romanized as Maḩmūdābād-e Seh Dāng; also known as Mahmood Abade Seh Dangeh and Maḩmūdābād-e Seh Dāngeh) is a village in Tasuj Rural District, in the Central District of Kavar County, Fars province, Iran. At the 2006 census, its population was 883, in 205 families.
