= Qasr-e Ahmad =

Qasr-e Ahmad قصراحمد
- Village
- Location within Iran
- Coordinates: 29°10′27″N 52°45′59″E
- Country: Iran
- Province: Fars
- County: Kavar
- Bakhsh: Central
- Rural District: Kavar

Population (2006)
  - Total: 2,303
- Time zone: UTC+3:30 (IRST)
  - Summer (DST): UTC+4:30 (IRDT)

Qasr-e Ahmad (Persian: قصراحمد, also Romanized as Qaşr-e Aḩmad and Qasr Ahmad; also known as Kasr Aḩmad) is a village in Kavar Rural District, in the Central District of Kavar County, Fars province, Iran. At the 2006 census, its population was 2,303, in 527 families.
