= Baghan, Kavar =

Baghan باغان
- Village
- Location within Iran
- Coordinates: 29°17′47″N 52°38′54″E
- Country: Iran
- Province: Fars
- County: Kavar
- Bakhsh: Central
- Rural District: Tasuj

Population (2006)
  - Total: 2,744
- Time zone: UTC+3:30 (IRST)
  - Summer (DST): UTC+4:30 (IRDT)

Baghan (Persian: باغان, also Romanized as Bāghān) is a village in Tasuj Rural District, in the Central District of Kavar County, Fars province, Iran. At the 2006 census, its population was 2,744, in 577 families.
