= Deh Shib, Fars =

Village in Fars province, Iran

Deh Shib Persian: ده شيب
- Village
- Location within Iran
- Coordinates: 29°05′14″N 52°48′51″E
- Country: Iran
- Province: Fars
- County: Kavar
- District: Central
- Rural District: Farmeshkan

Population (2016)
  - Total: 944
- Time zone: UTC+3:30 (IRST)

Deh Shib (Persian: ده شيب) (Note: Also romanized as Deh Shīb and Deh-e Shīb) is a village in, and the capital of, Farmeshkan Rural District of the Central District of Kavar County, Fars province, Iran.

== Demographics ==
=== Population ===
At the time of the 2006 National Census, the village's population was 1,159 in 279 households, when it was in the former Kavar District of Shiraz County. The following census in 2011 counted 1,045 people in 305 households, by which time the district had been separated from the county in the establishment of Kavar County. The rural district was transferred to the new Central District. The 2016 census measured the population of the village as 944 people in 308 households.
