= Shah Bahrami =

Shah Bahrami شاه بهرامي
- Village
- Location within Iran
- Coordinates: 29°10′44″N 52°39′31″E
- Country: Iran
- Province: Fars
- County: Kavar
- Bakhsh: Central
- Rural District: Kavar

Population (2006)
  - Total: 18
- Time zone: UTC+3:30 (IRST)
  - Summer (DST): UTC+4:30 (IRDT)

Shah Bahrami (Persian: شاه بهرامي, also Romanized as Shāh Bahrāmī; also known as Shāh Bahrām) is a village in Kavar Rural District, in the Central District of Kavar County, Fars province, Iran. At the 2006 census, its population was 18, in 5 families.
