= Mirisah =

Mirisah ميريسه
- Village
- Location within Iran
- Coordinates: 29°06′32″N 52°50′45″E
- Country: Iran
- Province: Fars
- County: Kavar
- Bakhsh: Central
- Rural District: Farmeshkhan

Population (2006)
  - Total: 209
- Time zone: UTC+3:30 (IRST)
  - Summer (DST): UTC+4:30 (IRDT)

Mirisah (Persian: ميريسه, also Romanized as Mīrīsah; also known as Marīshe, Merīsah, and Meriseh) is a village in Farmeshkhan Rural District, in the Central District of Kavar County, Fars province, Iran. At the 2006 census, its population was 209, in 52 families.
