= Valiasr, Fars =

Valiasr وليعصر
- Village
- Location within Iran
- Coordinates: 29°15′30″N 52°39′57″E
- Country: Iran
- Province: Fars
- County: Kavar
- Bakhsh: Central
- Rural District: Tasuj

Population (2006)
  - Total: 1,344
- Time zone: UTC+3:30 (IRST)
  - Summer (DST): UTC+4:30 (IRDT)

Valiasr (Persian: وليعصر, also Romanized as Valī‘aşr) is a village in Tasuj Rural District, in the Central District of Kavar County, Fars province, Iran. At the 2006 census, its population was 1,344, in 267 families.
