= Qaleh-ye Kohneh-ye Kavar =

Qaleh-ye Kohneh-ye Kavar قلعه كهنه كوار
- Village
- Country: Iran
- Province: Fars
- County: Kavar
- Bakhsh: Central
- Rural District: Kavar

Population (2006)
  - Total: 564
- Time zone: UTC+3:30 (IRST)
  - Summer (DST): UTC+4:30 (IRDT)

Qaleh-ye Kohneh-ye Kavar (Persian: قلعه كهنه كوار, also Romanized as Qal‘eh-ye Kohneh-ye Kavār) is a village in Kavar Rural District, in the Central District of Kavar County, Fars province, Iran. At the 2006 census, its population was 564, in 124 families.
