= Qaleh-ye Molla Hoseyn Ali =

Qaleh-ye Molla Hoseyn Ali قلعه ملاحسين علي
- Village
- Country: Iran
- Province: Fars
- County: Kavar
- Bakhsh: Central
- Rural District: Farmeshkhan

Population (2006)
  - Total: 66
- Time zone: UTC+3:30 (IRST)
  - Summer (DST): UTC+4:30 (IRDT)

Qaleh-ye Molla Hoseyn Ali (Persian: قلعه ملاحسين علي, also Romanized as Qal‘eh-ye Mollā Ḩoseyn 'Alī) is a village in Farmeshkhan Rural District, in the Central District of Kavar County, Fars province, Iran. At the 2006 census, its population became 66, in 14 families.
