= Qosira =

Qosira قصيرا
- Village
- Location within Iran
- Coordinates: 29°09′20″N 52°50′03″E
- Country: Iran
- Province: Fars
- County: Kavar
- Bakhsh: Central
- Rural District: Kavar

Population (2006)
  - Total: 525
- Time zone: UTC+3:30 (IRST)
  - Summer (DST): UTC+4:30 (IRDT)

Qosira (Persian: قصيرا, also Romanized as Qoşīrā, Qoşeyrā, Kasīreh, Qasreh, and Qaşr-e Seyyedhā) is a village in Kavar Rural District, in the Central District of Kavar County, Fars province, Iran. At the 2006 census, its population was 525, in 120 families.
