= Mahmudabad-e Yek Dang =

Mahmudabad-e Yek Dang محموداباديك دانگ
- Village
- Location within Iran
- Coordinates: 29°15′23″N 52°42′49″E
- Country: Iran
- Province: Fars
- County: Kavar
- Bakhsh: Central
- Rural District: Tasuj

Population (2006)
  - Total: 507
- Time zone: UTC+3:30 (IRST)
  - Summer (DST): UTC+4:30 (IRDT)

Mahmudabad-e Yek Dang (Persian: محموداباديك دانگ, also Romanized as Maḩmūdābād-e Yek Dāng; also known as Maḩmūdābād-e Yek Dāngeh, Maḩmūdābād Yek Dāngeh, and Yek Dāngeh) is a village in Tasuj Rural District, in the Central District of Kavar County, Fars province, Iran. At the 2006 census, its population was 507, in 126 families.
