= Khurgan =

Khurgan خورگان
- Village
- Location within Iran
- Coordinates: 29°17′11″N 52°33′08″E
- Country: Iran
- Province: Fars
- County: Kavar
- Bakhsh: Central
- Rural District: Tasuj

Population (2006)
  - Total: 159
- Time zone: UTC+3:30 (IRST)
  - Summer (DST): UTC+4:30 (IRDT)

Khurgan (Persian: خورگان, also Romanized as Khūrgān; also known as Khargūn) is a village in Tasuj Rural District, in the Central District of Kavar County, Fars province, Iran. As of the 2006 census, its population was 159, distributed among 31 families.
