= Hamdamabad =

Hamdamabad همدم اباد
- Village
- Location within Iran
- Coordinates: 29°17′06″N 52°29′48″E
- Country: Iran
- Province: Fars
- County: Kavar
- Bakhsh: Central
- Rural District: Tasuj

Population (2006)
  - Total: 201
- Time zone: UTC+3:30 (IRST)
  - Summer (DST): UTC+4:30 (IRDT)

Hamdamabad (Persian: همدم اباد, also Romanized as Hamdamābād) is a village in Tasuj Rural District, in the Central District of Kavar County, Fars province, Iran. At the 2006 census, its population was 201, in 46 families.
