= Mowlowy-ye Dust Mohammad =

Mowlowy-ye Dust Mohammad مولوئ دوست محمد
- Village
- Country: Iran
- Province: Sistan and Baluchestan
- County: Hirmand
- Bakhsh: Qorqori
- Rural District: Qorqori

Population (2006)
  - Total: 51
- Time zone: UTC+3:30 (IRST)
  - Summer (DST): UTC+4:30 (IRDT)

Mowlowy-ye Dust Mohammad (Persian: مولوئ دوست محمد, also Romanized as Mowlowy-ye Dūst Moḩammad) is a village in Qorqori Rural District, Qorqori District, Hirmand County, Sistan and Baluchestan Province, Iran. At the 2006 census, its population was 51, in 9 families.
