= Samad-e Deh-e Mardeh =

Samad-e Deh-e Mardeh صمد دهمرده
- Village
- Country: Iran
- Province: Sistan and Baluchestan
- County: Hirmand
- Bakhsh: Qorqori
- Rural District: Qorqori

Population (2006)
  - Total: 25
- Time zone: UTC+3:30 (IRST)
  - Summer (DST): UTC+4:30 (IRDT)

Samad-e Deh-e Mardeh (Persian: صمد دهمرده, also romanized as Şamad-e Deh-e Mardeh) is a village in Qorqori Rural District, Qorqori District, Hirmand County, Sistan and Baluchestan Province, Iran. At the 2006 census, its population was 25, in 5 families.
