= Asalu (disambiguation) =

Asalu is a 2023 Indian Telugu-language crime thriller film.

Asalu may also refer to:

- Asalu, Khuzestan, a village in Iran
- Darreh Asali, also known as Asalū, a village in Iran

== See also ==
- Asaluyeh, a city in Iran
