= Mozaffari, Kavar =

City in Fars province, Iran

Mozaffari Persian: مظفری
- City
- Location within Iran
- Coordinates: 29°11′24″N 52°47′22″E
- Country: Iran
- Province: Fars
- County: Kavar
- District: Central

Population (2016)
  - Total: 4,012
- Time zone: UTC+3:30 (IRST)

Mozaffari (Persian: مظفری) (Note: Also romanized as Moz̧affarī; also known as Muzaffarī) is a city in the Central District of Kavar County, Fars province, Iran.

== Demographics ==
=== Population ===
At the time of the 2006 National Census, Mozaffari's population was 3,862 in 890 households, when it was a village in Kavar Rural District of the former Kavar District of Shiraz County. The following census in 2011 counted 3,791 people in 1,012 households, by which time the district had been separated from the county in the establishment of Kavar County. The rural district was transferred to the new Central District. The 2016 census measured the population of the village as 4,012 people in 1,145 households.

After the census, Mozaffari was elevated to the status of a city.
