= Arbabi-ye Sofla =

Arbabi-ye Sofla اربابي سفلي
- Village
- Location within Iran
- Coordinates: 29°13′55″N 52°45′03″E
- Country: Iran
- Province: Fars
- County: Kavar
- Bakhsh: Central
- Rural District: Kavar

Population (2006)
  - Total: 1,265
- Time zone: UTC+3:30 (IRST)
  - Summer (DST): UTC+4:30 (IRDT)

Arbabi-ye Sofla (Persian: اربابي سفلي, also Romanized as Ārbābī-ye Soflá) is a village in Kavar Rural District, in the Central District of Kavar County, Fars province, Iran. At the 2006 census, its population was 1,265, in 288 families.
