= Buraki, Kavar =

Buraki بوركي
- Village
- Location within Iran
- Coordinates: 29°17′56″N 52°43′49″E
- Country: Iran
- Province: Fars
- County: Kavar
- Bakhsh: Central
- Rural District: Tasuj

Population (2006)
  - Total: 500
- Time zone: UTC+3:30 (IRST)
  - Summer (DST): UTC+4:30 (IRDT)

Buraki (Persian: بوركي, also Romanized as Būrakī; also known as Būrak-e Bālā, Būrak-e Dāman, and Būrakī-ye Bālā) is a village in Tasuj Rural District, in the Central District of Kavar County, Fars province, Iran. At the 2006 census, its population was 500, in 102 families.
