= Deh-e Bozi =

Deh-e Bozi ده بزي
- Village
- Location within Iran
- Coordinates: 31°11′31″N 61°43′52″E
- Country: Iran
- Province: Sistan and Baluchestan
- County: Hirmand
- Bakhsh: Qorqori
- Rural District: Qorqori

Population (2006)
  - Total: 158
- Time zone: UTC+3:30 (IRST)
  - Summer (DST): UTC+4:30 (IRDT)

Deh-e Bozi (Persian: ده بزي, also Romanized as Deh-e Bozī) is a village in Qorqori Rural District, Qorqori District, Hirmand County, Sistan and Baluchestan Province, Iran. At the 2006 census, its population was 158, in 35 families.
