= Shah-e Shahidan, Fars =

Shah-e Shahidan شاه شهيدان
- Village
- Location within Iran
- Coordinates: 29°13′47″N 52°41′43″E
- Country: Iran
- Province: Fars
- County: Kavar
- Bakhsh: Central
- Rural District: Tasuj

Population (2006)
  - Total: 379
- Time zone: UTC+3:30 (IRST)
  - Summer (DST): UTC+4:30 (IRDT)

Shah-e Shahidan (Persian: شاه شهيدان, also Romanized as Shāh-e Shahīdān) is a village in Tasuj Rural District, in the Central District of Kavar County, Fars province, Iran. At the 2006 census, its population was 379, in 89 families.
