= Deh-e Miran =

Deh-e Miran or Deh Miran (Persian: ده ميران) may refer to:

- Deh-e Miran, Khuzestan
- Deh-e Miran, Sistan and Baluchestan
