= Deh-e Ali Ahmad-e Lek Zayi =

Deh-e Ali Ahmad-e Lek Zayi ده علي احمد لکزايي
- Village
- Country: Iran
- Province: Sistan and Baluchestan
- County: Hirmand
- Bakhsh: Qorqori
- Rural District: Qorqori

Population (2006)
  - Total: 33
- Time zone: UTC+3:30 (IRST)
  - Summer (DST): UTC+4:30 (IRDT)

Deh-e Ali Ahmad-e Lek Zayi (Persian: ده علي احمد لکزايي, also Romanized as Deh-e ʿAlī Aḩmad-e Lek Zāyī) is a village in Qorqori Rural District, Qorqori District, Hirmand County, Sistan and Baluchestan Province, Iran. At the 2006 census, its population was 33, in 6 families.
