= Rig-e Muri =

Rig-e Muri ريگموري
- Village
- Location within Iran
- Coordinates: 31°18′22″N 61°43′00″E
- Country: Iran
- Province: Sistan and Baluchestan
- County: Hirmand
- Bakhsh: Qorqori
- Rural District: Qorqori

Population (2006)
  - Total: 53
- Time zone: UTC+3:30 (IRST)
  - Summer (DST): UTC+4:30 (IRDT)

Rig-e Muri (Persian: ريگموري, also Romanized as Rīg-e Mūrī) is a village in Qorqori Rural District, Qorqori District, Hirmand County, Sistan and Baluchestan Province, Iran. At the 2006 census, its population was 53, in 11 families.
