= Farahi, Iran =

Farahi فراهي
- Village
- Location within Iran
- Coordinates: 31°14′05″N 61°36′46″E
- Country: Iran
- Province: Sistan and Baluchestan
- County: Hirmand
- Bakhsh: Qorqori
- Rural District: Qorqori

Population (2006)
  - Total: 42
- Time zone: UTC+3:30 (IRST)
  - Summer (DST): UTC+4:30 (IRDT)

Farahi (Persian: فراهي, also Romanized as Farāhī; also known as Deh-e Farāhī) is a village in Qorqori Rural District, Qorqori District, Hirmand County, Sistan and Baluchestan Province, Iran. At the 2006 census, its population was 42, in 7 families.
