= Deh-e Ali Ahmad-e Lek Zahi =

Deh-e Ali Ahmad-e Lek Zahi ده علي احمد لک زهي
- Village
- Location within Iran
- Coordinates: 31°14′32″N 61°36′19″E
- Country: Iran
- Province: Sistan and Baluchestan
- County: Hirmand
- Bakhsh: Qorqori
- Rural District: Qorqori

Population (2006)
  - Total: 90
- Time zone: UTC+3:30 (IRST)
  - Summer (DST): UTC+4:30 (IRDT)

Deh-e Ali Ahmad-e Lek Zahi (Persian: ده علي احمد لک زهي, also Romanized as Deh-e ‘Alī Aḩmad-e Lek Zahī; also known as ‘Alī Aḩmad and Deh-e ‘Alī Aḩmad-e Malek Zahī) is a village in Qorqori Rural District, Qorqori District, Hirmand County, Sistan and Baluchestan Province, Iran. At the 2006 census, its population was 90, in 15 families.
