= Molla Nur Mohammad =

Molla Nur Mohammad ملانورمحمد
- Village
- Location within Iran
- Coordinates: 31°12′43″N 61°35′46″E
- Country: Iran
- Province: Sistan and Baluchestan
- County: Hirmand
- Bakhsh: Qorqori
- Rural District: Qorqori

Population (2006)
  - Total: 232
- Time zone: UTC+3:30 (IRST)
  - Summer (DST): UTC+4:30 (IRDT)

Molla Nur Mohammad (Persian: ملانورمحمد, also Romanized as Mollā Nūr Moḩammad) is a village in Qorqori Rural District, Qorqori District, Hirmand County, Sistan and Baluchestan Province, Iran. At the 2006 census, its population was 232, in 43 families.
