= As Hajji =

As Hajji اس حاجي
- Village
- Location within Iran
- Coordinates: 31°17′22″N 61°40′31″E
- Country: Iran
- Province: Sistan and Baluchestan
- County: Hirmand
- Bakhsh: Qorqori
- Rural District: Qorqori

Population (2006)
  - Total: 59
- Time zone: UTC+3:30 (IRST)
  - Summer (DST): UTC+4:30 (IRDT)

As Hajji (Persian: اس حاجي, also Romanized as Ās Ḩājjī; also known as Āsīājī) is a village in Qorqori Rural District, Qorqori District, Hirmand County, Sistan and Baluchestan Province, Iran. At the 2006 census, its population was 59, in 16 families.
