= Deraz =

Deraz دراز
- Village
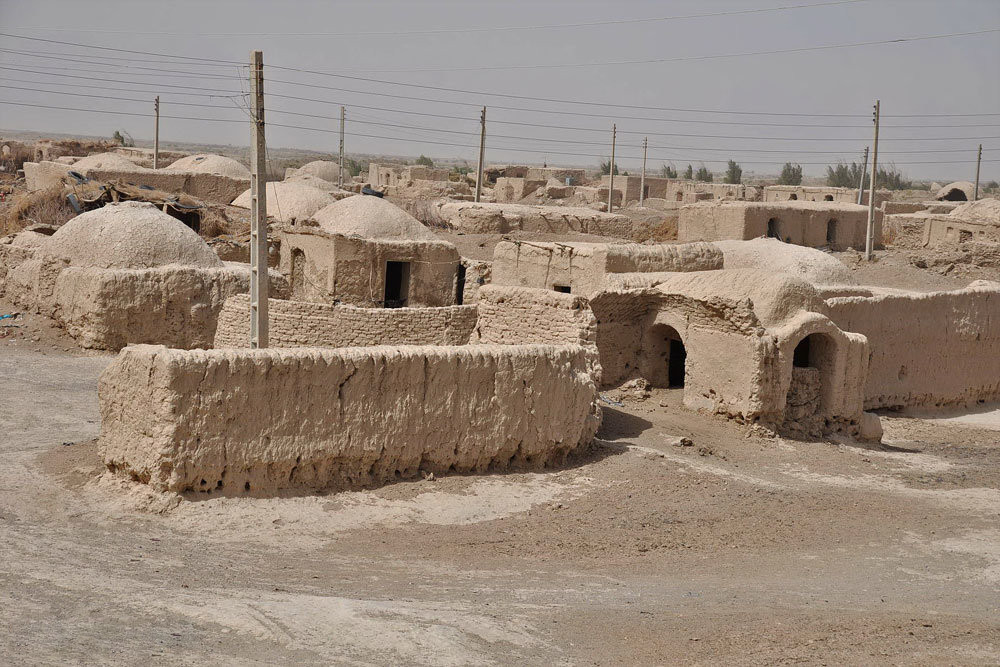
- Deraz

- Location within Iran
- Coordinates: 31°17′24″N 61°31′48″E
- Country: Iran
- Province: Sistan and Baluchestan
- County: Hirmand
- Bakhsh: Qorqori
- Rural District: Qorqori

Population (2006)
  - Total: 139
- Time zone: UTC+3:30 (IRST)
  - Summer (DST): UTC+4:30 (IRDT)

Deraz (Persian: دراز, also Romanized as Derāz) is a village in Qorqori Rural District, Qorqori District, Hirmand County, Sistan and Baluchestan Province, Iran. At the 2006 census, its population was 139, in 23 families.
