= Molla Ali =

Molla Ali or Mulla-Ali (Persian: ملاعلي) may refer to:

- Molla Ali, East Azerbaijan
- Molla Ali, Qazvin
- Molla Ali, Sistan and Baluchestan
- Molla Ali, alternate name of Molla Dadi, Sistan and Baluchestan Province
