= Deh-e Alishah =

Deh-e Alishah د ه عليشا ه
- Village
- Location within Iran
- Coordinates: 31°12′11″N 61°45′47″E
- Country: Iran
- Province: Sistan and Baluchestan
- County: Hirmand
- Bakhsh: Qorqori
- Rural District: Qorqori

Population (2006)
  - Total: 73
- Time zone: UTC+3:30 (IRST)
  - Summer (DST): UTC+4:30 (IRDT)

Deh-e Alishah (Persian: د ه عليشا ه, also Romanized as Deh-e ‘Alīshāh) is a village in Qorqori Rural District, Qorqori District, Hirmand County, Sistan and Baluchestan Province, Iran. At the 2006 census, its population was 73, in 12 families.
