= Mir Gol-e Kalati =

Mir Gol-e Kalati ميرگل كلاتي
- Village
- Location within Iran
- Coordinates: 31°14′07″N 61°34′59″E
- Country: Iran
- Province: Sistan and Baluchestan
- County: Hirmand
- Bakhsh: Qorqori
- Rural District: Qorqori

Population (2006)
  - Total: 48
- Time zone: UTC+3:30 (IRST)
  - Summer (DST): UTC+4:30 (IRDT)

Mir Gol-e Kalati (Persian: ميرگل كلاتي, also Romanized as Mīr Gol-e Kalātī) is a village in Qorqori Rural District, Qorqori District, Hirmand County, Sistan and Baluchestan Province, Iran. At the 2006 census, its population was 48 with 9 families.
