= Darreh Asali =

Darreh Asali دره عسلي
- Village
- Location within Iran
- Coordinates: 29°19′57″N 52°40′27″E
- Country: Iran
- Province: Fars
- County: Kavar
- Bakhsh: Central
- Rural District: Tasuj

Population (2006)
  - Total: 441
- Time zone: UTC+3:30 (IRST)
  - Summer (DST): UTC+4:30 (IRDT)

Darreh Asali (Persian: دره عسلي, also Romanized as Darreh 'Asalī; also known as 'Asalū and Darreh 'Asalū) is a village in Tasuj Rural District, in the Central District of Kavar County, Fars province, Iran. At the 2006 census, its population was 441, in 96 families.
