= Qeshlaq-e Anjireh =

Qeshlaq-e Anjireh قشلاق انجير
- Village
- Location within Iran
- Coordinates: 29°19′12″N 52°41′53″E
- Country: Iran
- Province: Fars
- County: Kavar
- Bakhsh: Central
- Rural District: Tasuj

Population (2006)
  - Total: 141
- Time zone: UTC+3:30 (IRST)
  - Summer (DST): UTC+4:30 (IRDT)

Qeshlaq-e Anjireh (Persian: قشلاق انجير, also Romanized as Qeshlāq-e Anjīreh; also known as Anjīreh) is a village in Tasuj Rural District, in the Central District of Kavar County, Fars province, Iran. At the 2006 census, its population was 141, in 29 families.
