= Karaq-e Shah Jahan =

Karaq-e Shah Jahan كرق شاه جان
- Village
- Location within Iran
- Coordinates: 31°17′18″N 61°38′45″E
- Country: Iran
- Province: Sistan and Baluchestan
- County: Hirmand
- Bakhsh: Qorqori
- Rural District: Qorqori

Population (2006)
  - Total: 111
- Time zone: UTC+3:30 (IRST)
  - Summer (DST): UTC+4:30 (IRDT)

Karaq-e Shah Jahan (Persian: كرق شاه جان, also Romanized as Karaq Shāh Jān; also known as Karakh Shāh Jān) is a village in Qorqori Rural District, Qorqori District, Hirmand County, Sistan and Baluchestan Province, Iran. At the 2006 census, its population was 111, in 30 families.
