= Deh-e Nur Mohammad Khan =

Deh-e Nur Mohammad Khan ده نور محمد خان
- Village
- Location within Iran
- Coordinates: 31°12′49″N 61°45′42″E
- Country: Iran
- Province: Sistan and Baluchestan
- County: Hirmand
- Bakhsh: Qorqori
- Rural District: Qorqori

Population (2006)
  - Total: 180
- Time zone: UTC+3:30 (IRST)
  - Summer (DST): UTC+4:30 (IRDT)

Deh-e Nur Mohammad Khan (Persian: ده نور محمد خان, also Romanized as Deh-e Nūr Moḩammad Khān; also known as Deh-e Nūr Moḩammad and Nūr Moḩammad Khān) is a village in Qorqori Rural District, Qorqori District, Hirmand County, Sistan and Baluchestan Province, Iran. At the 2006 census, its population was 180, in 38 families.
