= Amrudi =

Amrudi امرودي
- Village
- Location within Iran
- Coordinates: 31°11′21″N 61°43′12″E
- Country: Iran
- Province: Sistan and Baluchestan
- County: Hirmand
- Bakhsh: Qorqori
- Rural District: Qorqori

Population (2006)
  - Total: 154
- Time zone: UTC+3:30 (IRST)
  - Summer (DST): UTC+4:30 (IRDT)

Amrudi (Persian: امرودي, also Romanized as Āmrūdī; also known as Deh-e Namrūdī, Namrūdī, and Ramrūdī) is a village in Qorqori Rural District, Qorqori District, Hirmand County, Sistan and Baluchestan Province, Iran. At the 2006 census, its population was 154, in 31 families.
