= Shahraki =

Shahraki شهركي
- Village
- Location within Iran
- Coordinates: 31°12′36″N 61°41′43″E
- Country: Iran
- Province: Sistan and Baluchestan
- County: Hirmand
- Bakhsh: Qorqori
- Rural District: Qorqori

Population (2006)
  - Total: 82
- Time zone: UTC+3:30 (IRST)
  - Summer (DST): UTC+4:30 (IRDT)

Shahraki (Persian: شهركي, also Romanized as Shahrakī; also known as Deh-e Shahrakī) is a village in Qorqori Rural District, Qorqori District, Hirmand County, Sistan and Baluchestan Province, Iran. At the 2006 census, its population was 82, in 18 families.
