= Gamshad =

Gamshad گمشاد
- Village
- Location within Iran
- Coordinates: 31°21′29″N 61°41′56″E
- Country: Iran
- Province: Sistan and Baluchestan
- County: Hirmand
- Bakhsh: Qorqori
- Rural District: Qorqori

Population (2006)
  - Total: 789
- Time zone: UTC+3:30 (IRST)
  - Summer (DST): UTC+4:30 (IRDT)

Gamshad (Persian: گمشاد, also Romanized as Gamshād) is a village in Qorqori Rural District, Qorqori District, Hirmand County, Sistan and Baluchestan Province, Iran. At the 2006 census, its population was 789, in 155 families.
