= Arbabi-ye Olya =

Arbabi-ye Olya اربابي عليا
- Village
- Location within Iran
- Coordinates: 29°16′29″N 52°45′30″E
- Country: Iran
- Province: Fars
- County: Kavar
- Bakhsh: Central
- Rural District: Kavar

Population (2006)
  - Total: 458
- Time zone: UTC+3:30 (IRST)
  - Summer (DST): UTC+4:30 (IRDT)

Arbabi-ye Olya (Persian: اربابي عليا, also Romanized as Ārbābī-ye 'Olyā) is a village in Kavar Rural District, in the Central District of Kavar County, Fars province, Iran. At the 2006 census, its population was 458, in 104 families.
