= Mir Shekar =

Mir Shekar ميرشكار
- Village
- Location within Iran
- Coordinates: 31°16′40″N 61°38′14″E
- Country: Iran
- Province: Sistan and Baluchestan
- County: Hirmand
- Bakhsh: Qorqori
- Rural District: Qorqori

Population (2006)
  - Total: 60
- Time zone: UTC+3:30 (IRST)
  - Summer (DST): UTC+4:30 (IRDT)

Mir Shekar (Persian: ميرشكار, also Romanized as Mīr Shekār; also known as Gheyb ‘Alī) is a village in Qorqori Rural District, Qorqori District, Hirmand County, Sistan and Baluchestan Province, Iran. At the 2006 census, its population was 60, in 12 families.
