= Pakir Mahmud =

Pakir Mahmud پكيرمحمود
- Village
- Location within Iran
- Coordinates: 31°15′51″N 61°35′27″E
- Country: Iran
- Province: Sistan and Baluchestan
- County: Hirmand
- Bakhsh: Qorqori
- Rural District: Qorqori

Population (2006)
  - Total: 115
- Time zone: UTC+3:30 (IRST)
  - Summer (DST): UTC+4:30 (IRDT)

Pakir Mahmud (Persian: پكيرمحمود, also Romanized as Pakīr Maḩmūd) is a village in Qorqori Rural District, Qorqori District, Hirmand County, Sistan and Baluchestan Province, Iran. At the 2006 census, its population was 115, in 20 families.
