= Deh-e Miran, Sistan and Baluchestan =

Deh-e Miran ده ميران
- Village
- Location within Iran
- Coordinates: 31°12′04″N 61°45′05″E
- Country: Iran
- Province: Sistan and Baluchestan
- County: Hirmand
- Bakhsh: Qorqori
- Rural District: Qorqori

Population (2006)
  - Total: 165
- Time zone: UTC+3:30 (IRST)
  - Summer (DST): UTC+4:30 (IRDT)

Deh-e Miran (Persian: ده ميران, also Romanized as Deh-e Mīrān; also known as Mīrān) is a village in Qorqori Rural District, Qorqori District, Hirmand County, Sistan and Baluchestan Province, Iran. At the 2006 census, its population was 165, in 33 families.
