= Arbabi (Deh-e Arbabi), Hirmand =

Arbabi اربابي
- Village
- Location within Iran
- Coordinates: 31°16′36″N 61°34′16″E
- Country: Iran
- Province: Sistan and Baluchestan
- County: Hirmand
- Bakhsh: Qorqori
- Rural District: Qorqori

Population (2006)
  - Total: 662
- Time zone: UTC+3:30 (IRST)
  - Summer (DST): UTC+4:30 (IRDT)

Arbabi (Persian: اربابي, also Romanized as Ārbābī; also known as Deh-e Arbābī) is a village in Qorqori Rural District, Qorqori District, Hirmand County, Sistan and Baluchestan Province, Iran. At the 2006 census, its population was 662, in 139 families.
