= Molla Dadi =

Molla Dadi ملادادي
- Village
- Location within Iran
- Coordinates: 31°20′46″N 61°41′37″E
- Country: Iran
- Province: Sistan and Baluchestan
- County: Hirmand
- Bakhsh: Qorqori
- Rural District: Qorqori

Population (2006)
  - Total: 1,075
- Time zone: UTC+3:30 (IRST)
  - Summer (DST): UTC+4:30 (IRDT)

Molla Dadi (Persian: ملادادي, also Romanized as Mollā Dādī; also known as Mollā ‘Alī, Mollādārī, and Mollā Darvī) is a village in Qorqori Rural District, Qorqori District, Hirmand County, Sistan and Baluchestan Province, Iran. At the 2006 census, its population was 1,075, in 225 families.
