= Fathabad Rural District (Kavar County) =

Rural district in Fars province, Iran

Fathabad Rural District Persian: دهستان فتح‌آباد
- Rural District
- Location within Iran
- Coordinates: 29°16′50″N 52°34′21″E
- Country: Iran
- Province: Fars
- County: Kavar
- District: Tasuj
- Capital: Fathabad

Population (2016)
  - Total: 11,960
- Time zone: UTC+3:30 (IRST)

Fathabad Rural District (Persian: دهستان فتح‌آباد) is in Tasuj District of Kavar County, Fars province, Iran. Its capital is the village of Fathabad.

== History ==
In 2010, Kavar District was separated from Shiraz County in the establishment of Kavar County, and Fathabad Rural District was established in the new Tasuj District.

== Demographics ==
=== Population ===
At the time of the 2011 census, the rural district's population was 10,843 in 2,752 households. The 2016 census measured the population of the rural district as 11,960 in 3,267 households. The most populous of its 22 villages was Fathabad, with 3,804 people.
