= Buraki-ye Bala =

Buraki-ye Bala or Buraki Bala (Persian: بوركي بالا) may refer to:

- Buraki-ye Bala, Kavar
- Buraki-ye Bala, Kazerun
