= Akbarabad, Kavar =

City in Fars province, Iran

Akbarabad Persian: اکبراباد
- City
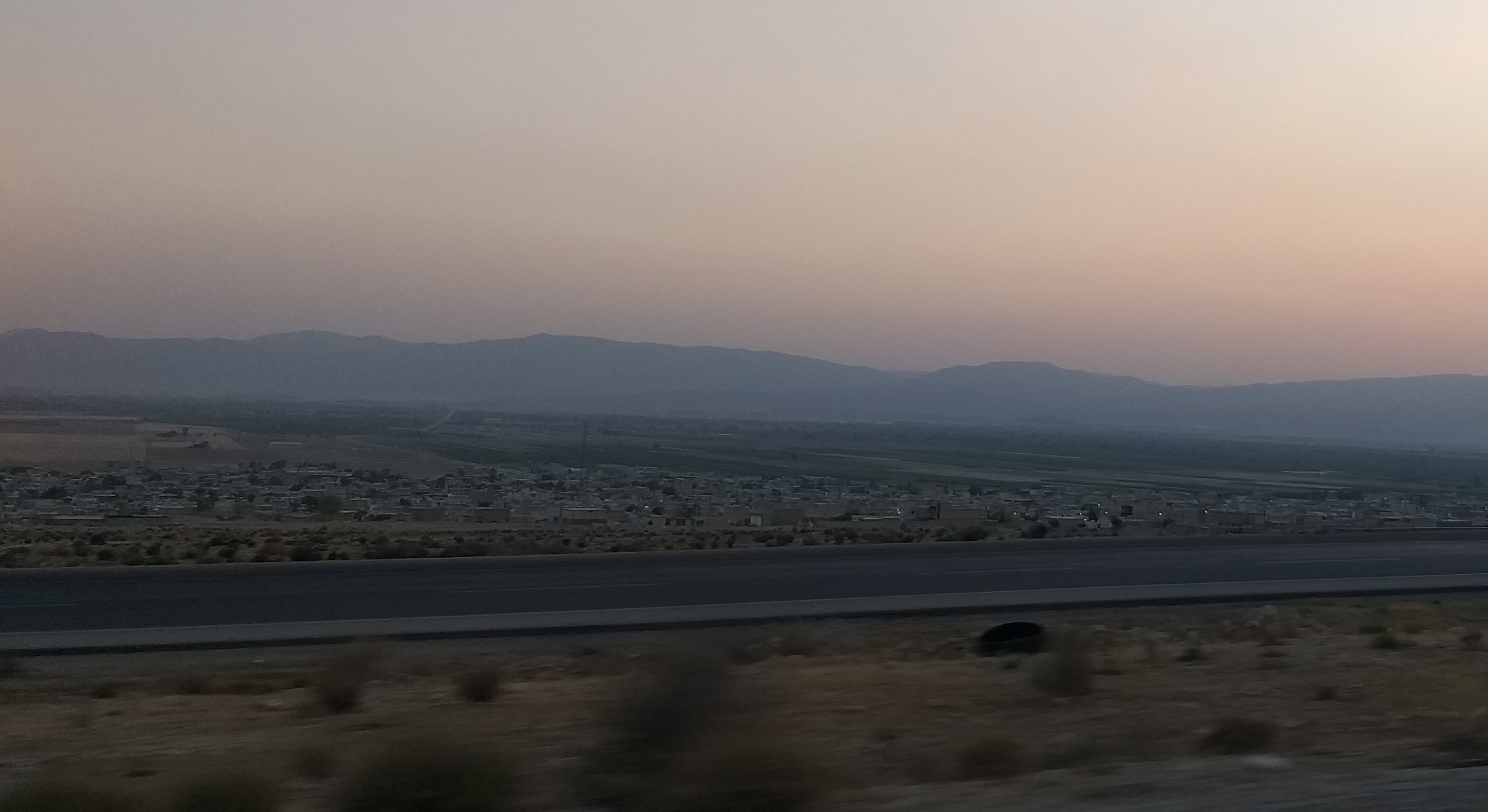

- Location within Iran
- Coordinates: 29°14′45″N 52°46′51″E
- Country: Iran
- Province: Fars
- County: Kavar
- District: Central

Population (2016)
  - Total: 5,817
- Time zone: UTC+3:30 (IRST)

Akbarabad (Persian: اکبراباد) (Note: Also romanized as Akbarābād; also known as Akbar Abad Kawar and Akbarābād-e Kavār) is a city in the Central District of Kavar County, Fars province, Iran. It was the capital of Kavar Rural District until its capital was transferred to the village of Nowruzan.

== Demographics ==
=== Population ===
At the time of the 2006 National Census, Akbarabad's population was 5,837 in 1,222 households, when it was a village in Kavar Rural District of the former Kavar District of Shiraz County. The following census in 2011 counted 6,133 people in 1,531 households, by which time the district had been separated from the county in the establishment of Kavar County. The rural district was transferred to the new Central District. The 2016 census measured the population of the village as 5,817 people in 1,629 households. It was the most populous village in its rural district.

After the census, Akbarabad was elevated to the status of a city.
