= Shah-e Shahidan =

Shah-e Shahidan or Shah Shahidan (Persian: شاه شهيدان) may refer to:

- Shah-e Shahidan, Fars
- Shah-e Shahidan, Gilan
