= Tasuj, Fars =

City in Fars province, Iran

Tasuj Persian: طسوج
- City
- Location within Iran
- Coordinates: 29°16′01″N 52°41′57″E
- Country: Iran
- Province: Fars
- County: Kavar
- District: Tasuj

Population (2016)
  - Total: 4,555
- Time zone: UTC+3:30 (IRST)

Tasuj (Persian: طسوج) (Note: Also romanized as Tasooj and Ţasūj; also known as Tasūch) is a city in, and the capital of, Tasuj District of Kavar County, Fars province, Iran. It also serves as the administrative center for Tasuj Rural District.

== Demographics ==
=== Population ===
At the time of the 2006 National Census, Tasuj's population was 5,814 in 1,243 households, when it was a village in Tasuj Rural District of the former Kavar District of Shiraz County. The following census in 2011 counted 5,136 people in 1,249 households, by which time the district had been separated from the county in the establishment of Kavar County. The rural district was transferred to the new Tasuj District. The 2016 census measured the population of the village as 4,555 people in 1,141 households.

After the census, Tasuj was elevated to the status of a city.
