= Qorqori =

City in Sistan and Baluchestan province, Iran

Qorqori Persian: قرقری
- City
- Location within Iran
- Coordinates: 31°15′59″N 61°42′56″E
- Country: Iran
- Province: Sistan and Baluchestan
- County: Hirmand
- District: Qorqori

Population (2016)
  - Total: 1,329
- Time zone: UTC+3:30 (IRST)

Qorqori (Persian: قرقری) (Note: Also romanized as Qarqarī and Qorqorī; also known as Qorgorī) is a city in, and the capital of, Qorqori District of Hirmand County, (Note: Formerly Miyankongi County) Sistan and Baluchestan province, Iran. It also serves as the administrative center for Qorqori Rural District.

== Demographics ==
=== Population ===
At the time of the 2006 National Census, Qorqori's population was 919 in 189 households, when it was a village in Qorqori Rural District of the former Miyankongi District of Zabol County. The following census in 2011 counted 1,287 people in 245 households, by which time the district had been separated from the county in the establishment of Miyankongi County. (Note: Renamed Hirmand County) Qorqori Rural District was transferred to the new Qorqori District. The 2016 census measured the population of the village as 1,329 people in 324 households. It was the most populous village in its rural district.

After the census, Qorqori was elevated to the status of a city.
