= Tasuj Rural District =

Tasuj Rural District (Persian: دهستان طسوج) may refer to:

- Tasuj Rural District (Dashti County)
- Tasuj Rural District (Fars Province)
