= Dəmirçi, Shamakhi =

Dəmirçi
- Municipality
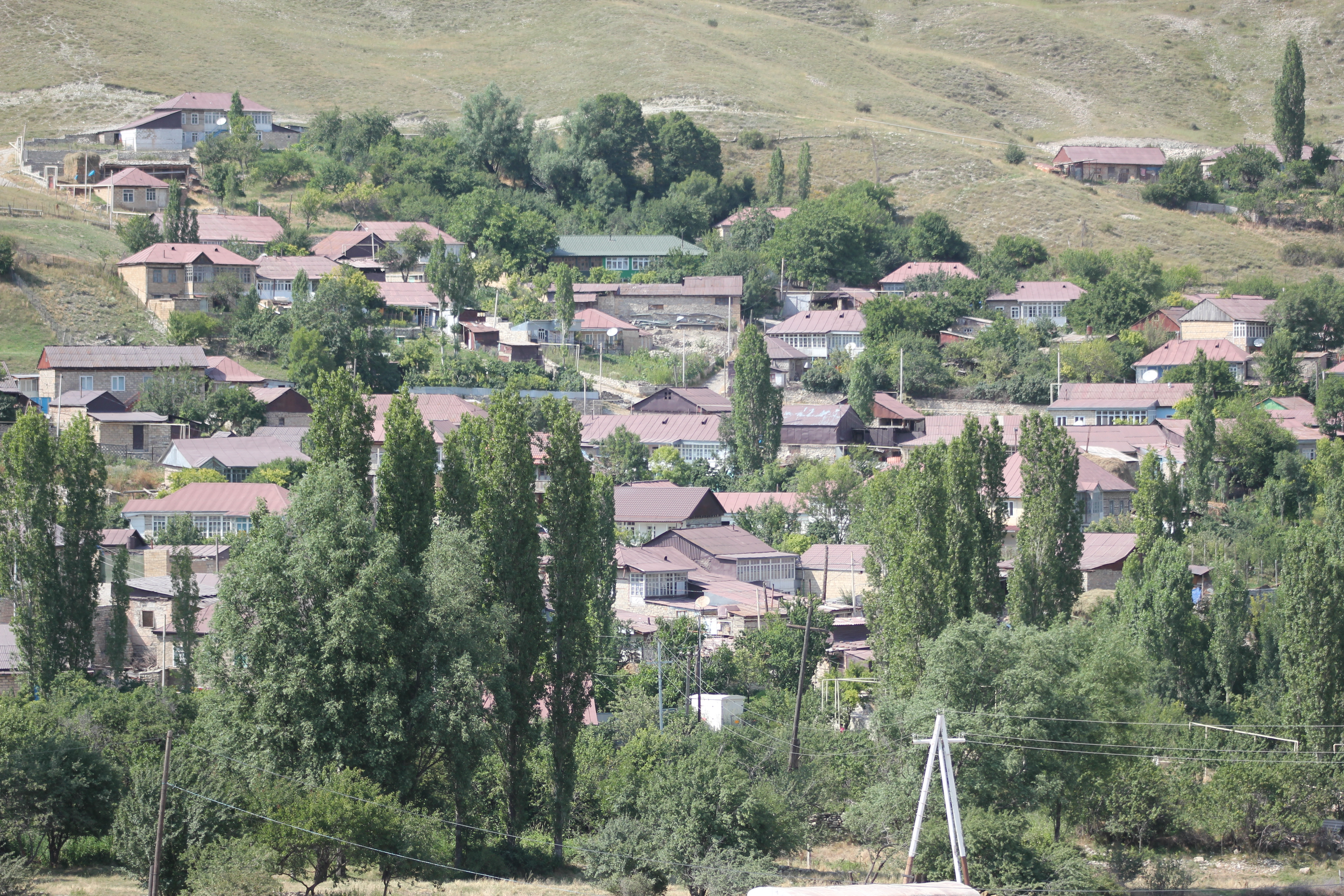

- Location within Azerbaijan
- Coordinates: 40°50′32″N 48°33′45″E
- Country: Azerbaijan
- District: Shamakhi

Population
  - Total: 891
- Time zone: UTC+4 (AZT)
  - Summer (DST): UTC+5 (AZT)

Dəmirçi (also, Damerchi and Demirchi) is a village and municipality in the Shamakhi Rayon of Azerbaijan. It has a population of 891. The municipality consists of the villages of Dəmirçi, Zarat Xeybəri, and Səfalı.

The Demirchi Village Mosque is located in the village.

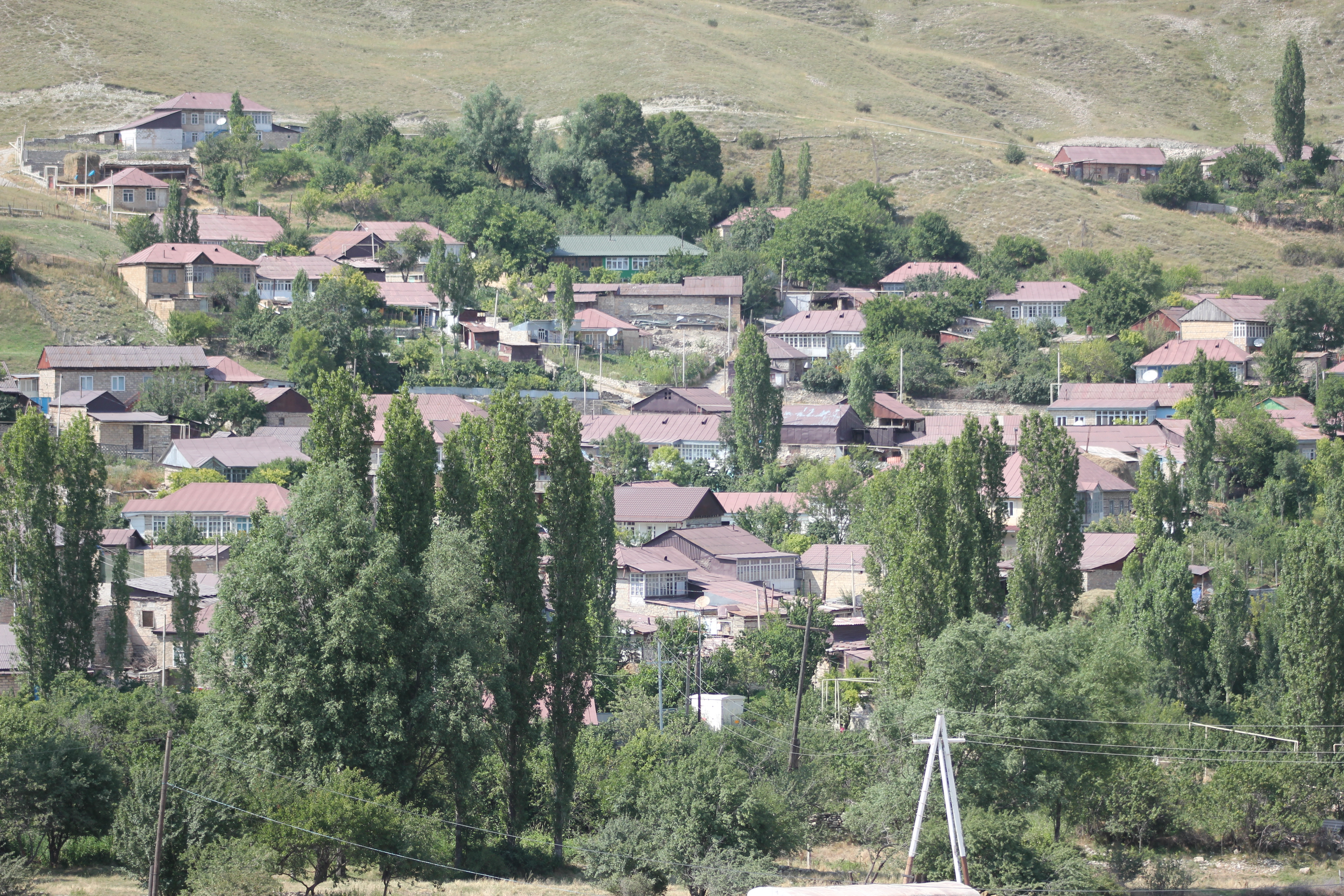
View of village Demirchi

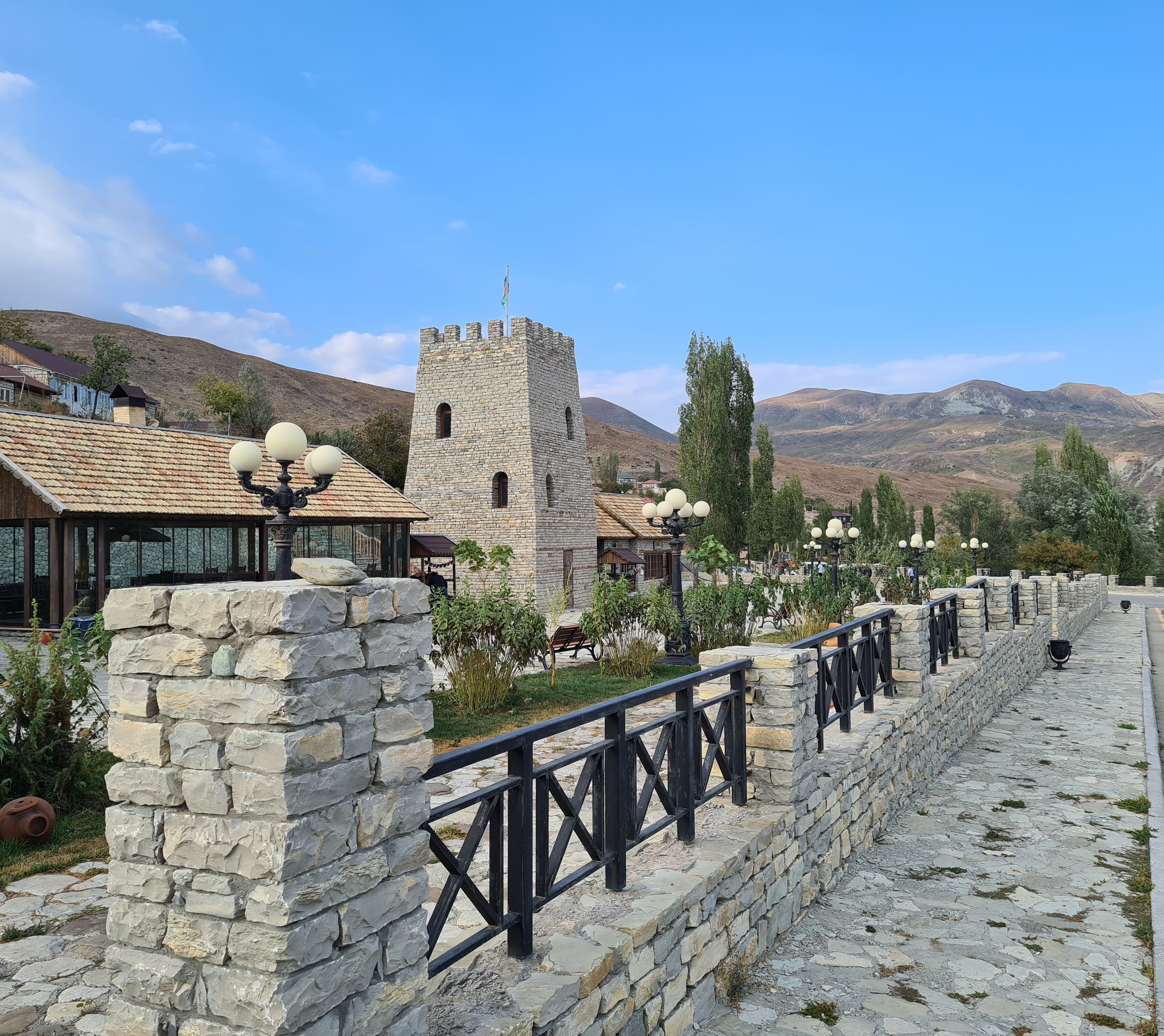
Entrance to the village

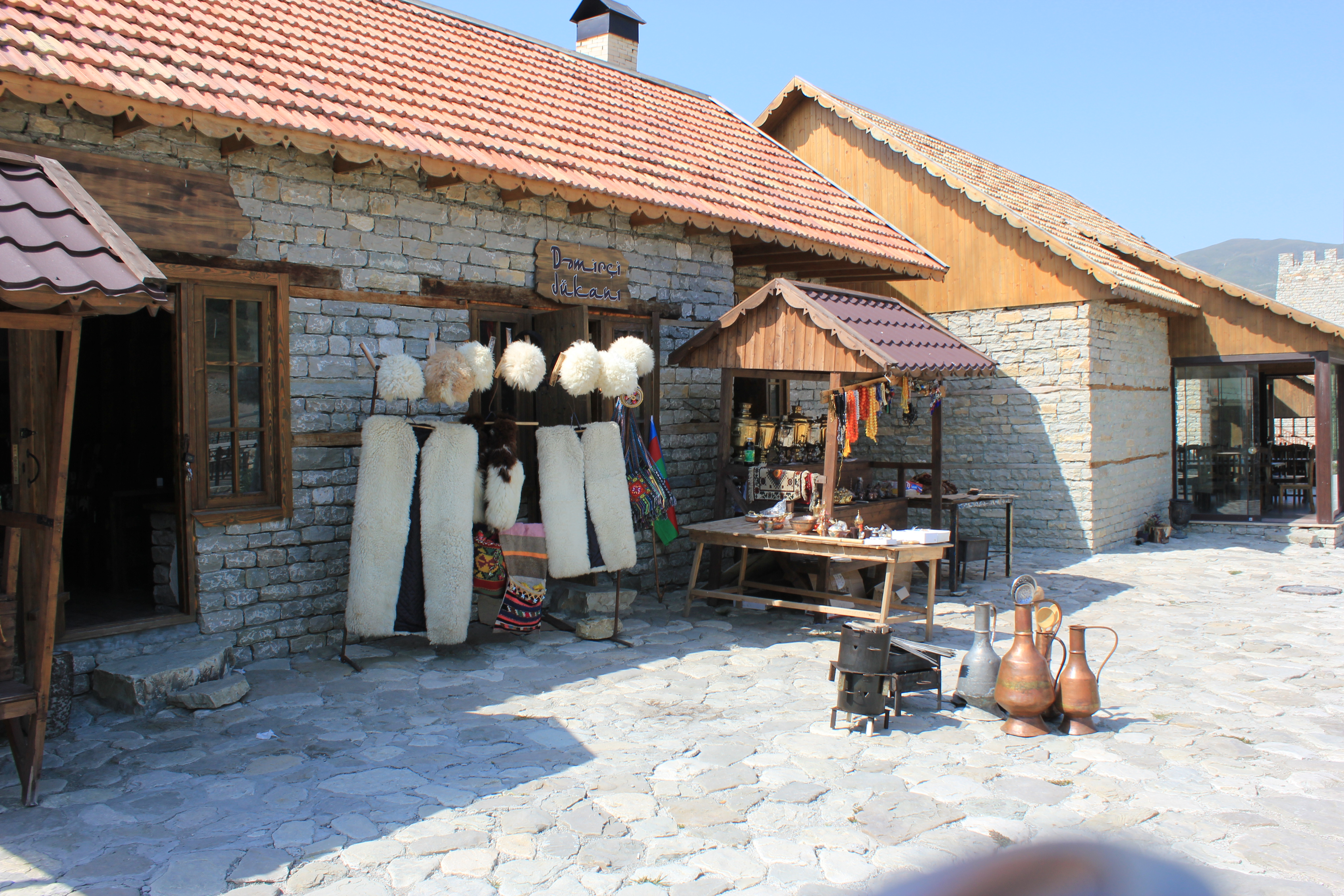
Crafters
