= Demirchi Village Mosque =

Mosque in Shamakhi, Azerbaijan

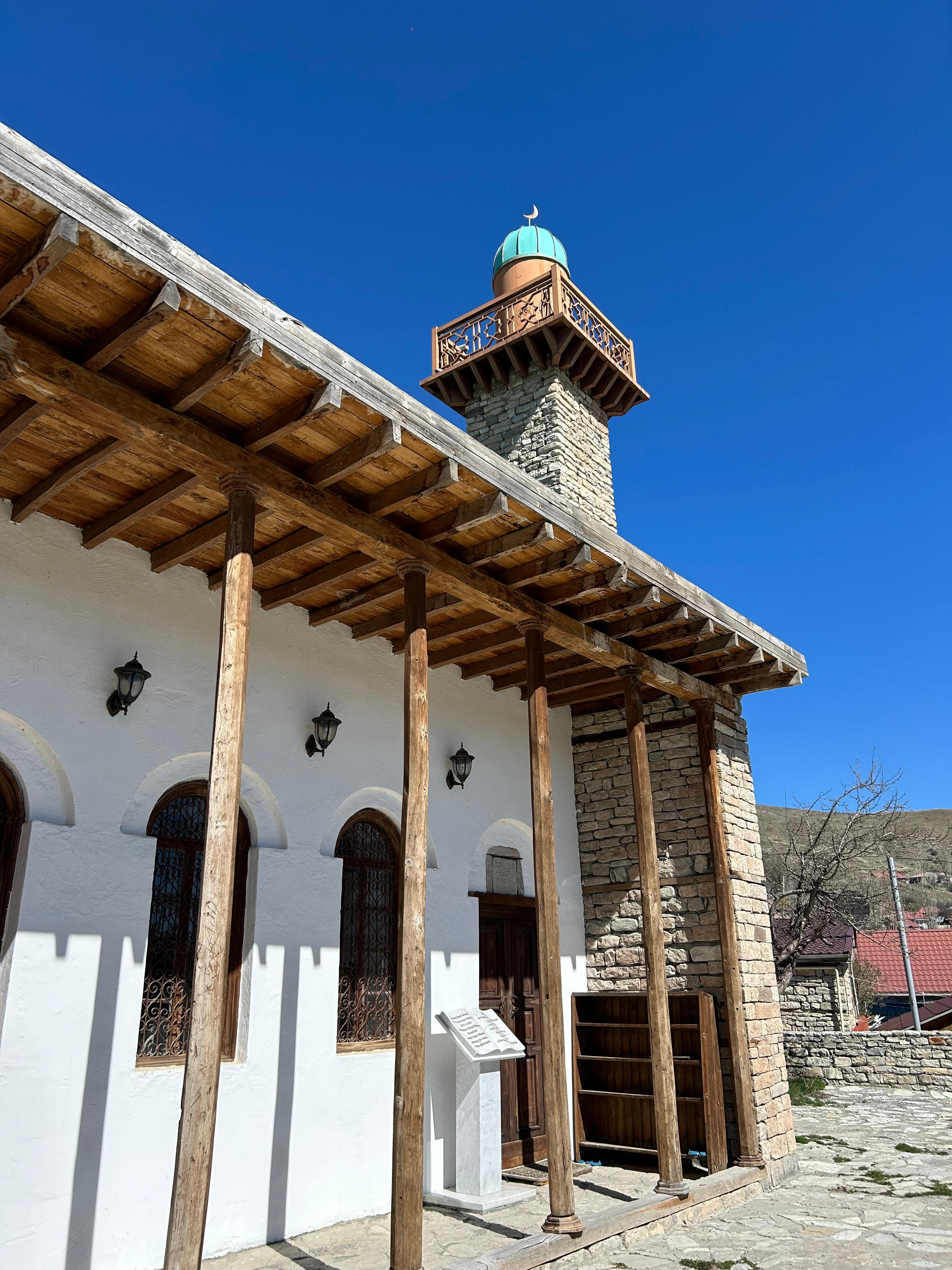
- Interactive map of Demirchi Village Mosque
- Location: Shamakhi District, Dəmirçi, Shamakhi

History
- Built: 1892

Site notes
- Area: Azerbaijan

The Demirchi Village Mosque is a historical and architectural monument built in 1892, located in the village of Demirchi, Shamakhi District, Azerbaijan. The mosque was included in the list of immovable historical and cultural monuments of local significance by Decision No. 132 of the Cabinet of Ministers of the Republic of Azerbaijan dated August 2, 2001.

== History ==
The Demirchi Village Mosque was built in 1892 in the village of Demirchi, Shamakhi District, Azerbaijan.

After the Soviet occupation, an official campaign against religion began in Azerbaijan in 1928. Many mosques, churches, and synagogues were repurposed as clubs for educational and cultural activities. While there were approximately 3,000 mosques in Azerbaijan in 1917, their number decreased to 1,700 in 1927, 1,369 in 1928, and only 17 by 1933. The Demirchi Village Mosque ceased to function during this period.

Following the restoration of Azerbaijan's independence, the mosque was included in the list of immovable historical and cultural monuments of local significance by Decision No. 132 of the Cabinet of Ministers of the Republic of Azerbaijan dated August 2, 2001.

In 2017, as part of restoration works in Demirchi village, the mosque was renovated and returned to use by worshippers.

== Pictures ==
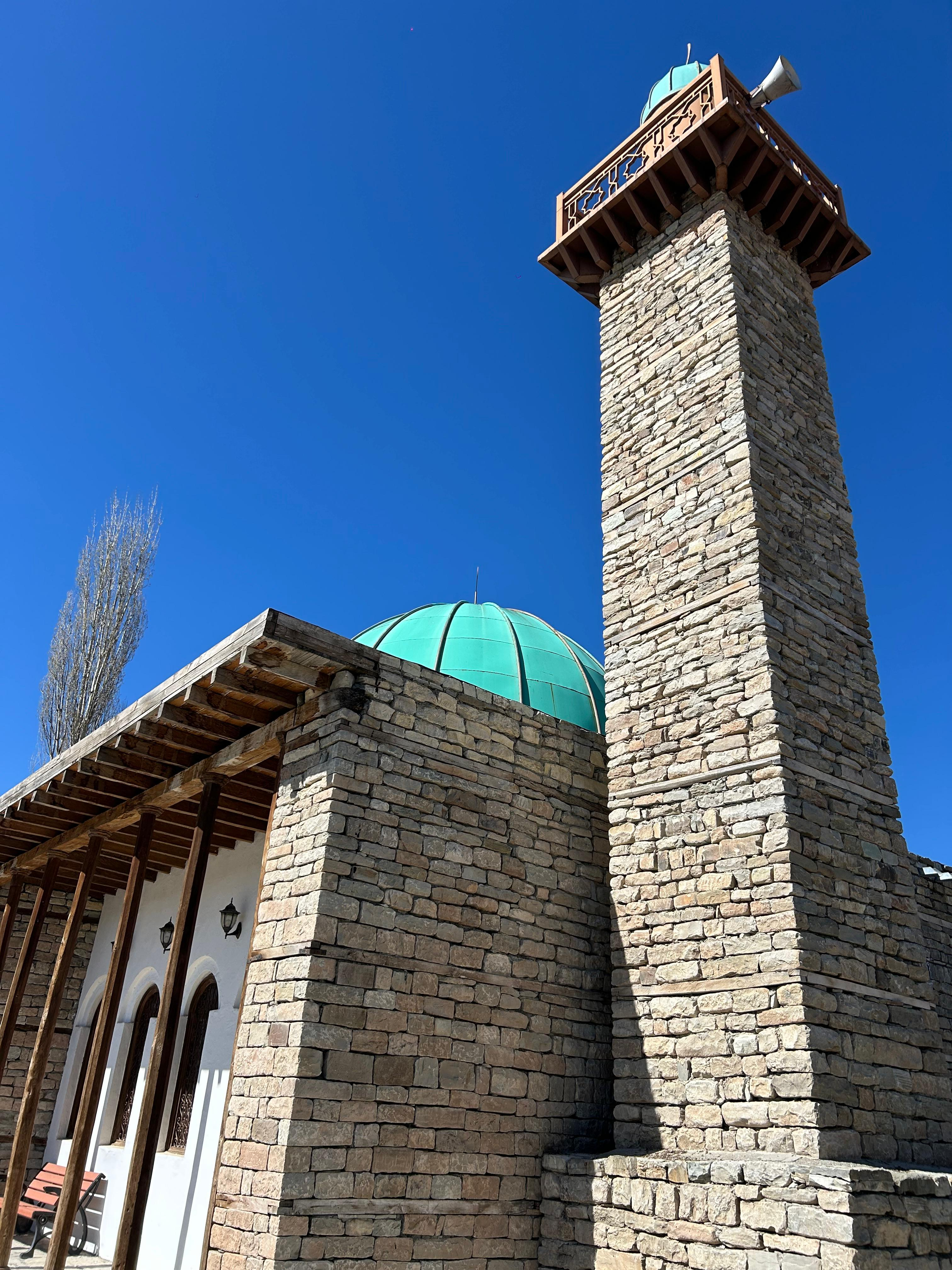

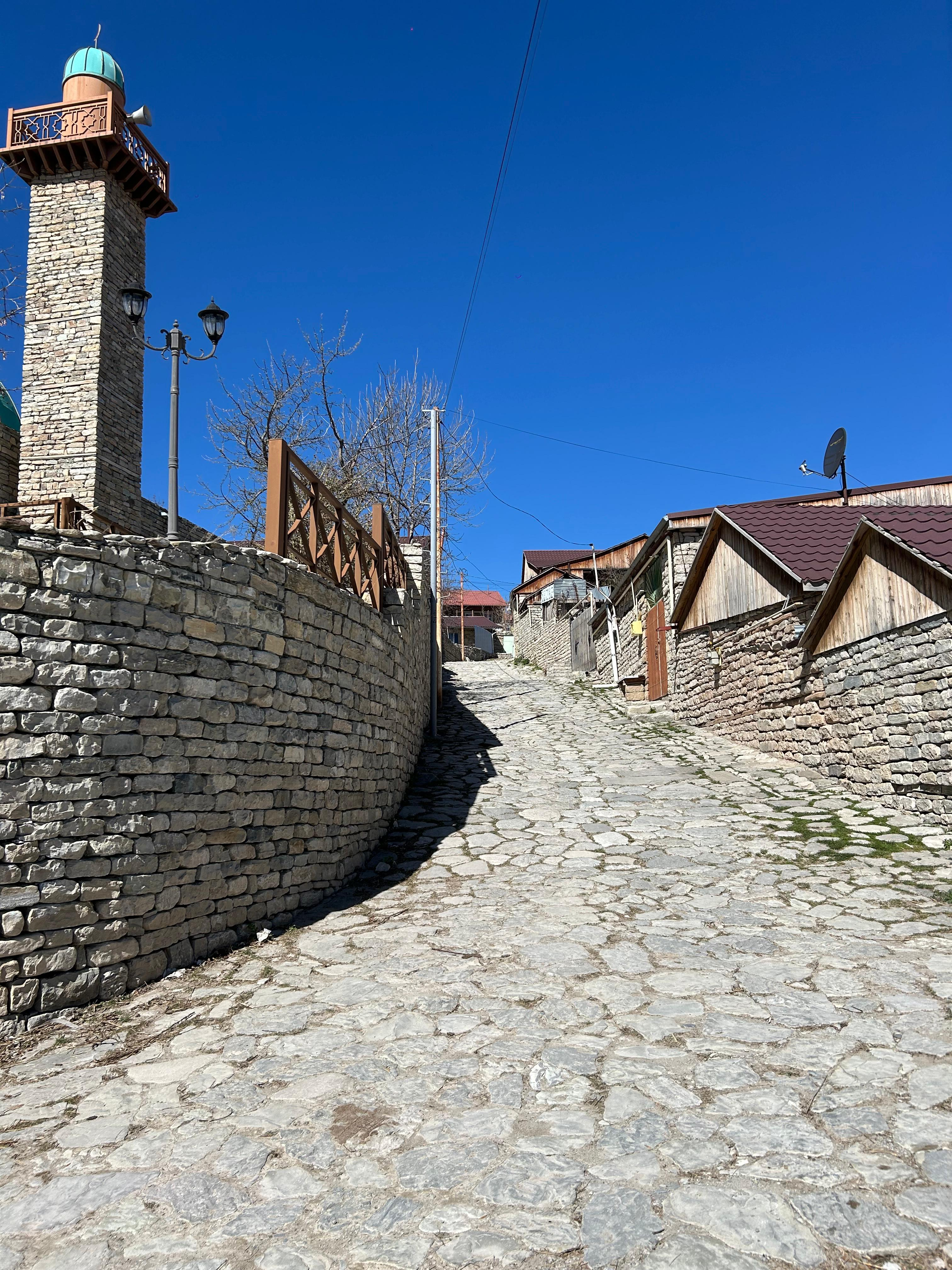

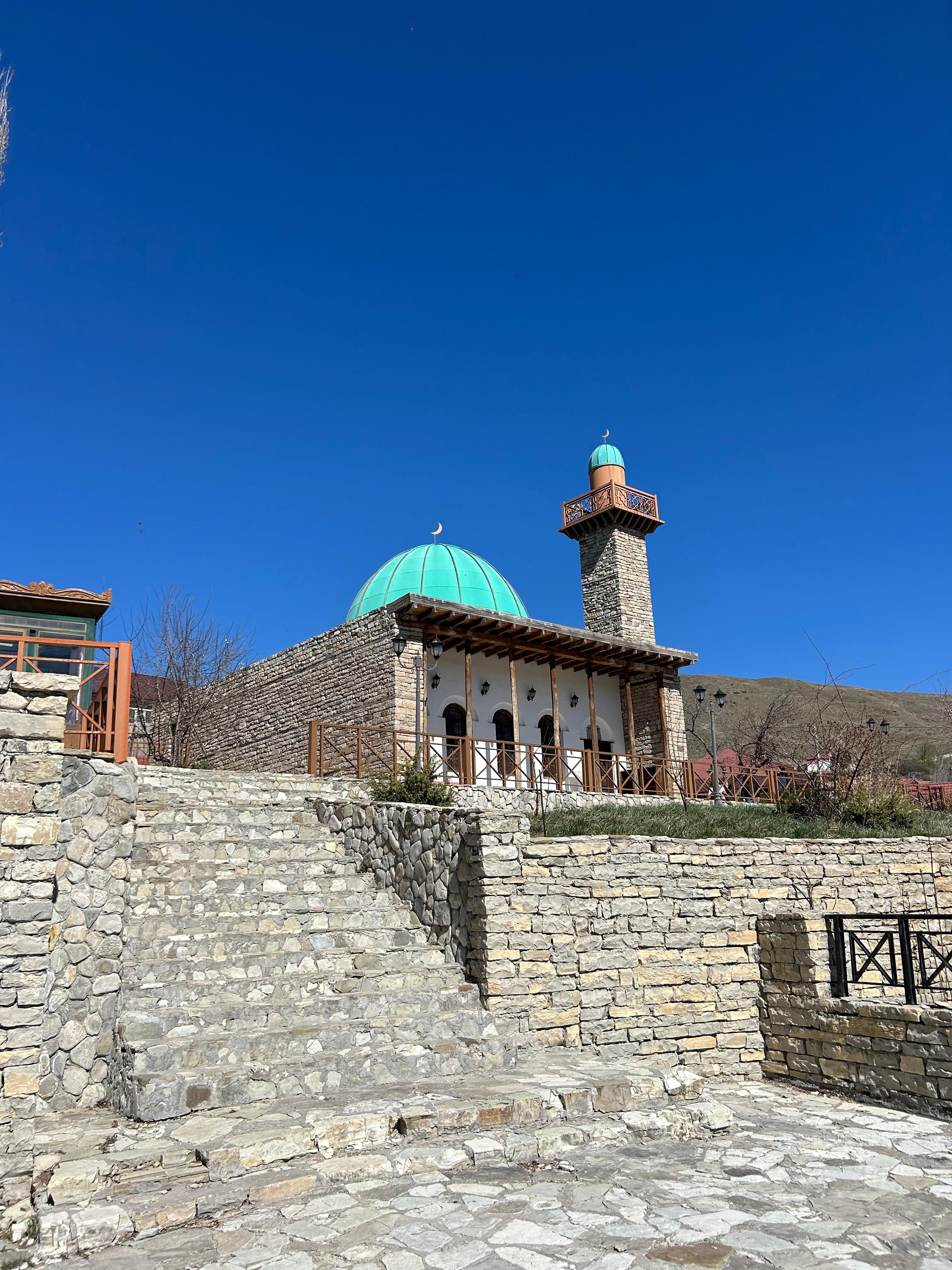

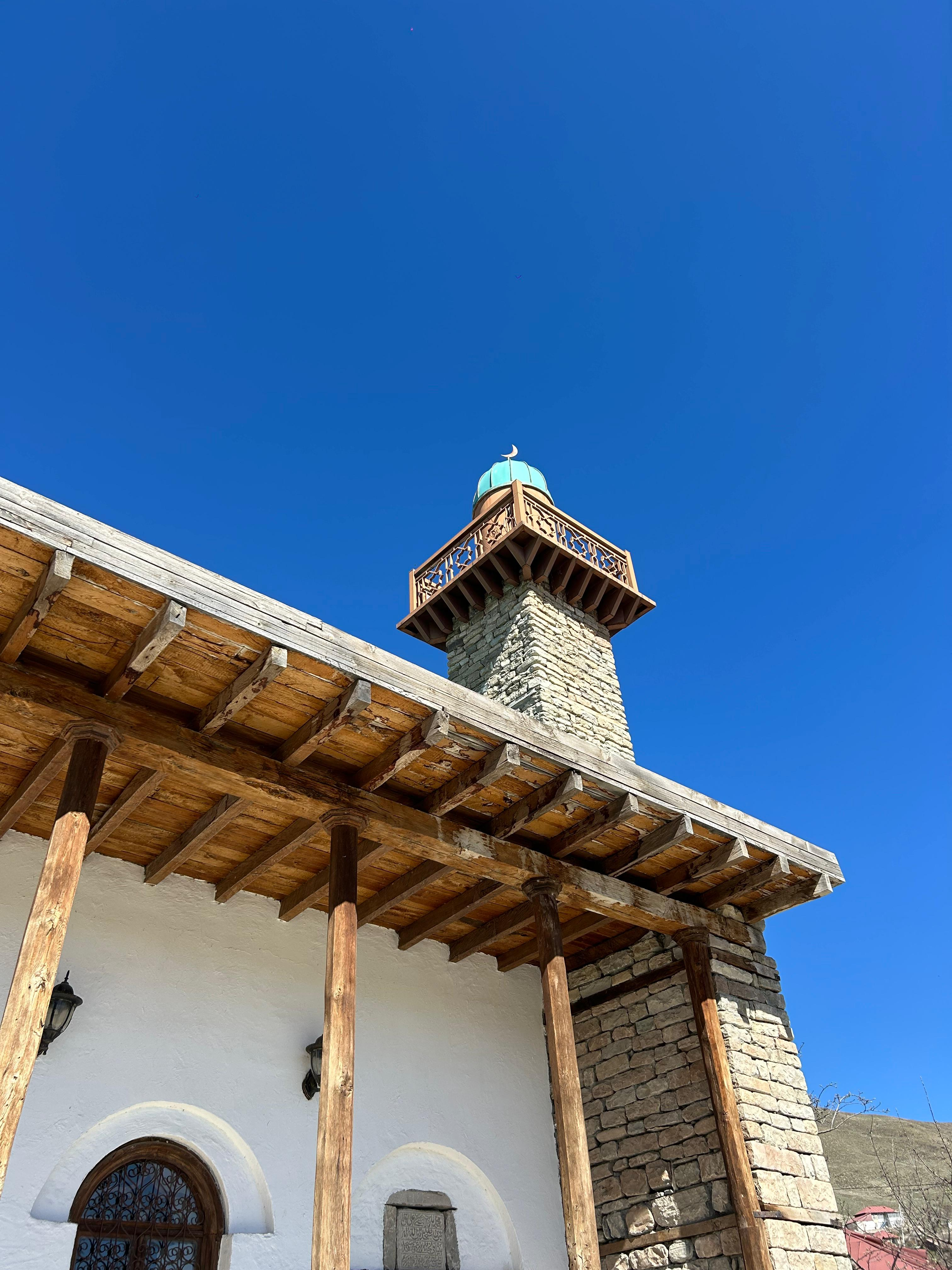

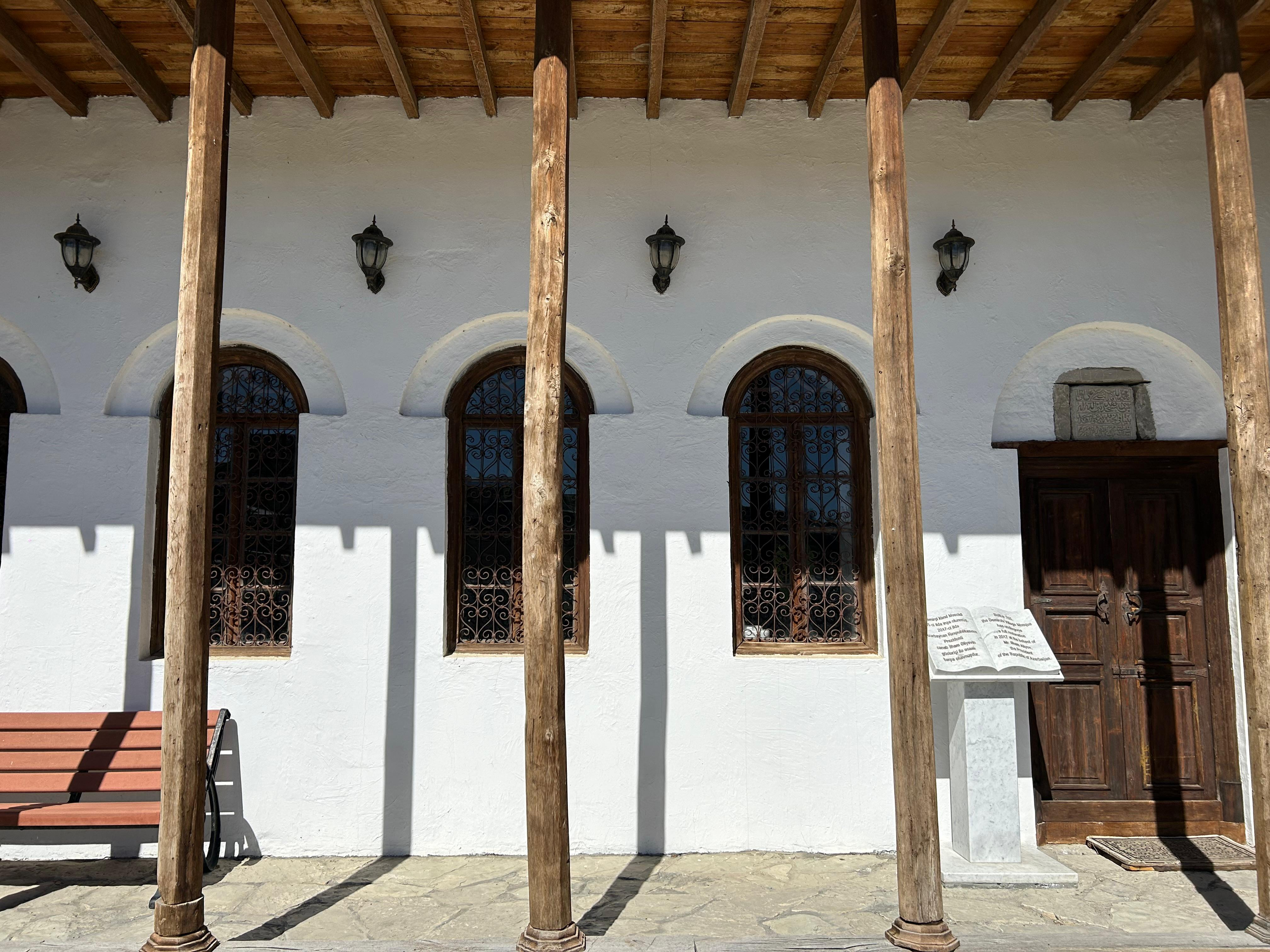

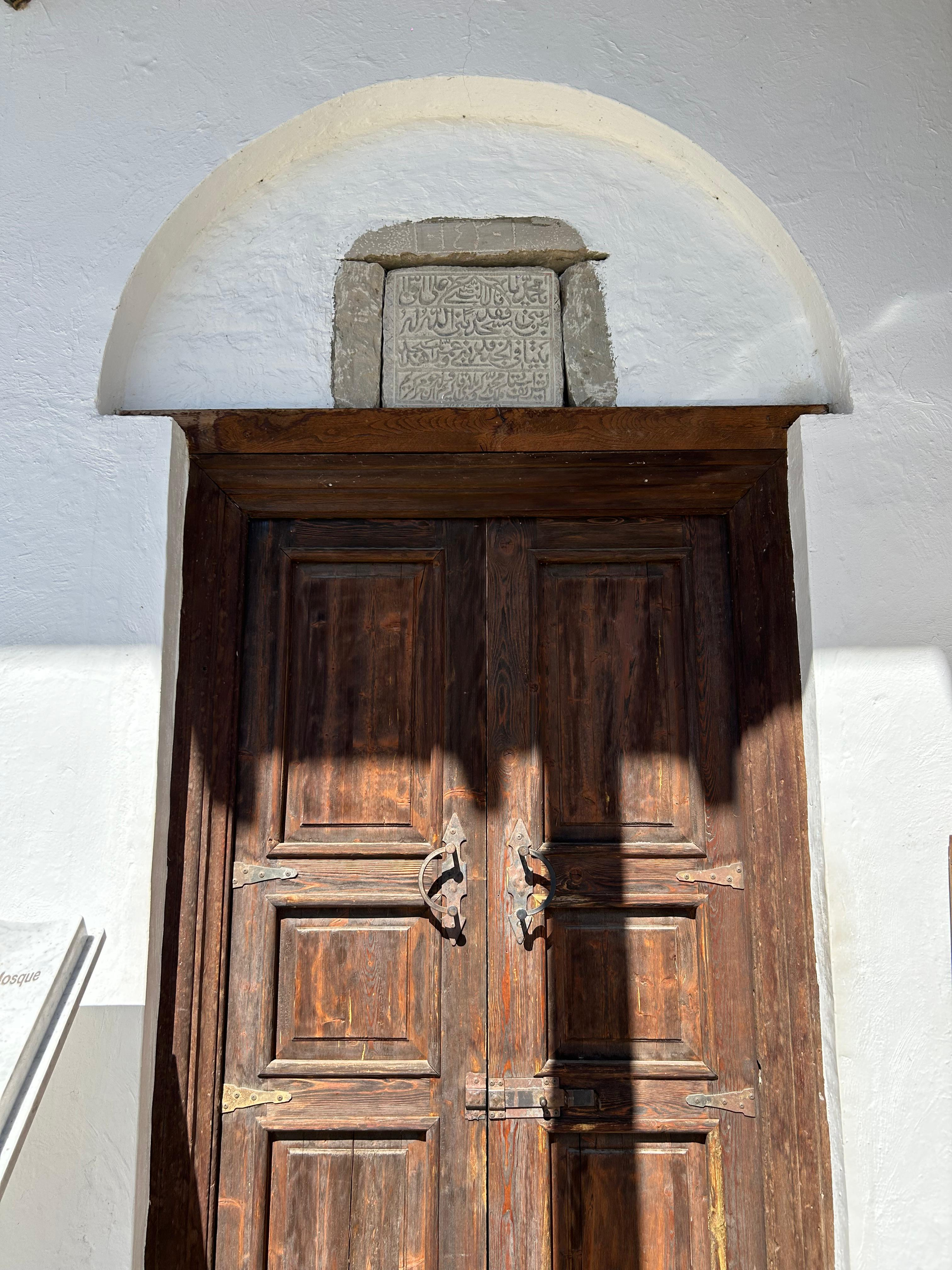

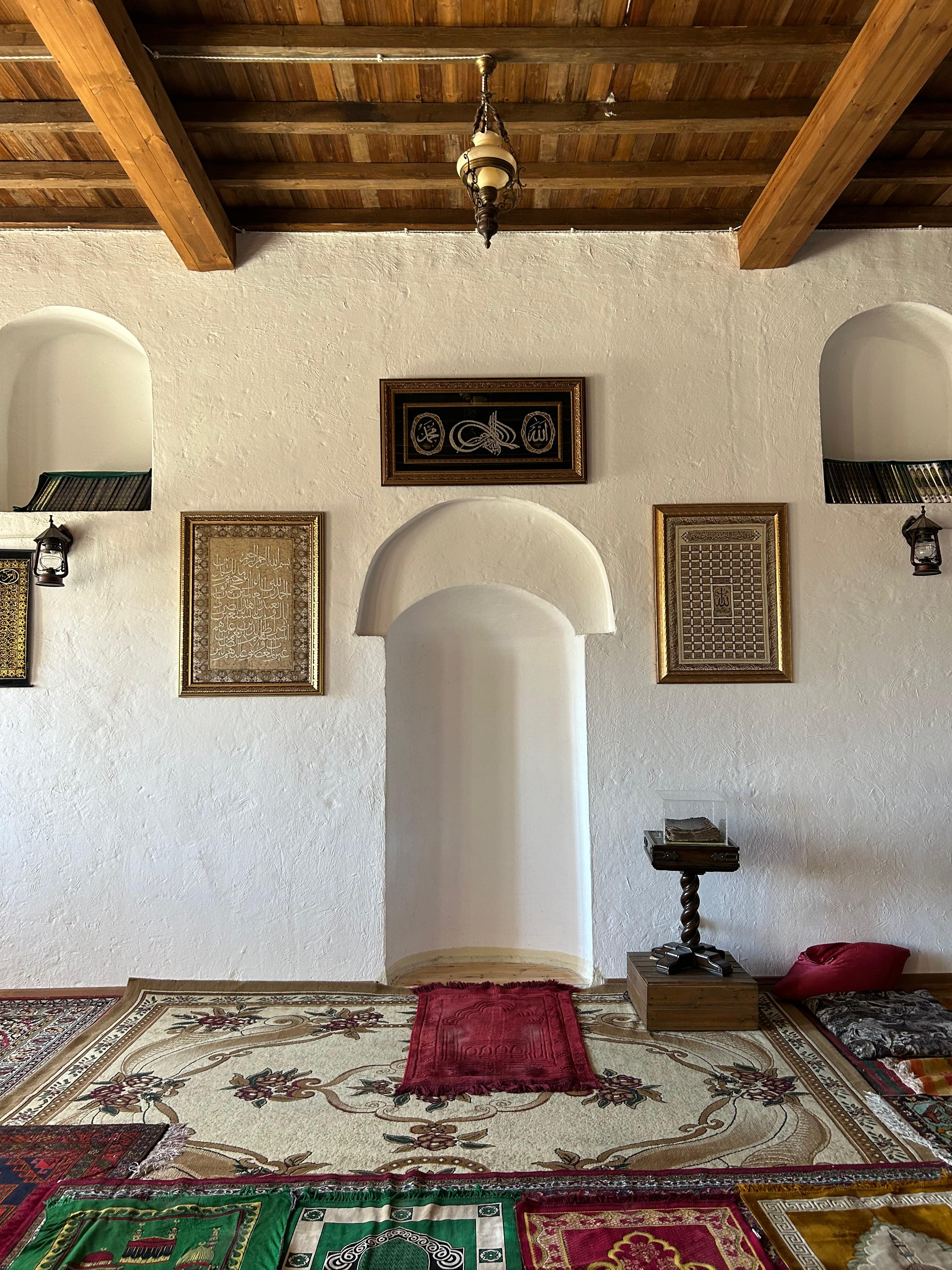

== Sources ==
- Yunusov, Arif (2004). Azərbaycanda İslam (PDF) (in Azerbaijani). Baku: Zaman. p. 364. Archived (PDF) from the original on July 5, 2023.
