= Tasuj District (Kavar County) =

District in Fars province, Iran

Tasuj District Persian: بخش طسوج
- District
- Location within Iran
- Coordinates: 29°16′49″N 52°37′19″E
- Country: Iran
- Province: Fars
- County: Kavar
- Capital: Tasuj

Population (2016)
  - Total: 23,159
- Time zone: UTC+3:30 (IRST)

Tasuj District (Persian: بخش طسوج) is in Kavar County, Fars province, Iran. Its capital is the city of Tasuj.

== History ==
In 2010, Kavar District was separated from Shiraz County in the establishment of Kavar County, which was divided into two districts of two rural districts each, with Kavar as its capital and only city at the time.

After the 2016 National Census, the village of Tasuj was elevated to the status of a city.

== Demographics ==
=== Population ===
At the time of the 2011 census, the district's population was 21,902 people in 5,411 households. The 2016 census measured the population of the district as 23,159 in 6,080 households.

=== Administrative divisions ===
Tasuj District Population
Administrative Divisions	2011	2016
Fathabad RD	10,843	11,960
Tasuj RD	11,059	11,199
Tasuj (city) (Note: Became a city after the 2016 census)		
Total	21,902	23,159
RD = Rural District
