= Səfalı =

- Location within Azerbaijan
- Coordinates: 40°50′58″N 48°34′44″E
- Country: Azerbaijan
- Rayon: Shamakhi
- Municipality: Dəmirçi
- Time zone: UTC+4 (AZT)
  - Summer (DST): UTC+5 (AZT)

Səfalı is a village in the Shamakhi Rayon of Azerbaijan. The village forms part of the municipality of Dəmirçi.
