= Zarat Xeybəri =

- Location within Azerbaijan
- Coordinates: 40°54′20″N 48°32′57″E
- Country: Azerbaijan
- Rayon: Shamakhi
- Municipality: Dəmirçi
- Time zone: UTC+4 (AZT)
  - Summer (DST): UTC+5 (AZT)

Zarat Xeybəri (also, Zarat Xeytəri and Zarat-Kheyberi) is a village in the Shamakhi Rayon of Azerbaijan. The village forms part of the municipality of Dəmirçi.
