= Deh-e Miran, Khuzestan =

Deh-e Miran ده ميران
- Village
- Location within Iran
- Coordinates: 32°03′12″N 49°52′43″E
- Country: Iran
- Province: Khuzestan
- County: Izeh
- Bakhsh: Susan
- Rural District: Susan-e Gharbi

Population (2006)
  - Total: 168
- Time zone: UTC+3:30 (IRST)
  - Summer (DST): UTC+4:30 (IRDT)

Deh-e Miran (Persian: ده ميران, also Romanized as Deh-e Mīrān and Deh Mīrān) is a village in Susan-e Gharbi Rural District, Susan District, Izeh County, Khuzestan Province, Iran. At the 2006 census, its population was 168, in 27 families.
