= Anjireh, Marvdasht =

Anjireh انجيره
- Village
- Location within Iran
- Coordinates: 29°57′19″N 52°59′48″E
- Country: Iran
- Province: Fars
- County: Marvdasht
- Bakhsh: Seyyedan
- Rural District: Rahmat

Population (2006)
  - Total: 1,058
- Time zone: UTC+3:30 (IRST)
  - Summer (DST): UTC+4:30 (IRDT)

Anjireh (Persian: انجيره, also Romanized as Anjīreh; also known as Anjireh Khafrak and Anjīreh-ye Khafrak) is a village in Rahmat Rural District, Seyyedan District, Marvdasht County, Fars province, Iran. At the 2006 census, its population was 1,058, in 244 families.
