= Anjireh, Khuzestan =

Anjireh انجيره
- Village
- Location within Iran
- Coordinates: 31°20′34″N 49°55′38″E
- Country: Iran
- Province: Khuzestan
- County: Bagh-e Malek
- Bakhsh: Meydavud
- Rural District: Saroleh

Population (2006)
  - Total: 36
- Time zone: UTC+3:30 (IRST)
  - Summer (DST): UTC+4:30 (IRDT)

Anjireh (Persian: انجيره, also Romanized as Ānjīreh; also known as Ānjīrsiyah) is a village in Saroleh Rural District, Meydavud District, Bagh-e Malek County, Khuzestan Province, Iran. At the 2006 census, its population was 36, in 8 families.
