= Tasuj-e Olya =

Tasuj-e Olya طسوج عليا
- Village
- Location within Iran
- Coordinates: 30°40′46″N 51°05′27″E
- Country: Iran
- Province: Kohgiluyeh and Boyer-Ahmad
- County: Charam
- Bakhsh: Central
- Rural District: Charam

Population (2006)
  - Total: 51
- Time zone: UTC+3:30 (IRST)
  - Summer (DST): UTC+4:30 (IRDT)

Tasuj-e Olya (Persian: طسوج عليا, also Romanized as Ţasūj-e ‘Olyā; also known as Ţasūj) is a village in Charam Rural District, in the Central District of Charam County, Kohgiluyeh and Boyer-Ahmad Province, Iran. At the 2006 census, its population was 51, in 8 families.
