= Anjireh-ye Gowkhast =

Anjireh-ye Gowkhast انجيره گوخاست
- Village
- Country: Iran
- Province: Fars
- County: Firuzabad
- Bakhsh: Meymand
- Rural District: Khvajehei

Population (2006)
  - Total: 31
- Time zone: UTC+3:30 (IRST)
  - Summer (DST): UTC+4:30 (IRDT)

Anjireh-ye Gowkhast (Persian: انجيره گوخاست, also Romanized as Ānjīreh-ye Gowkhāst) is a village in Khvajehei Rural District, Meymand District, Firuzabad County, Fars province, Iran. At the 2006 census, its population was 31, in 6 families.
