= Zarat, Shabran =

Zarat
- Location within Azerbaijan
- Coordinates: 40°58′23″N 48°46′23″E
- Country: Azerbaijan
- Rayon: Davachi
- Time zone: UTC+4 (AZT)
  - Summer (DST): UTC+5 (AZT)

Zarat is a village in the Davachi Rayon of Azerbaijan.
