= Anjireban Avareh Ali =

Anjireban Avareh Ali انجيربان اواره علي
- Village
- Location within Iran
- Coordinates: 34°38′25″N 45°57′15″E
- Country: Iran
- Province: Kermanshah
- County: Sarpol-e Zahab
- Bakhsh: Central
- Rural District: Posht Tang

Population (2006)
  - Total: 31
- Time zone: UTC+3:30 (IRST)
  - Summer (DST): UTC+4:30 (IRDT)

Anjireban Avareh Ali (Persian: انجيربان اواره علي, also Romanized as Anjīrebān Āvāreh ʿAlī; also known as Anjīr Bānavāreh, Anjīrebān Āvāreh, Anjīrebānvāreh, Anjīreh-ye Bān Āvāreh, and Sarzal) is a village in Posht Tang Rural District, in the Central District of Sarpol-e Zahab County, Kermanshah Province, Iran. At the 2006 census, its population was 31, in 8 families.
