= Kavar =

City in Fars province, Iran

Kavar Persian: كوار
- City
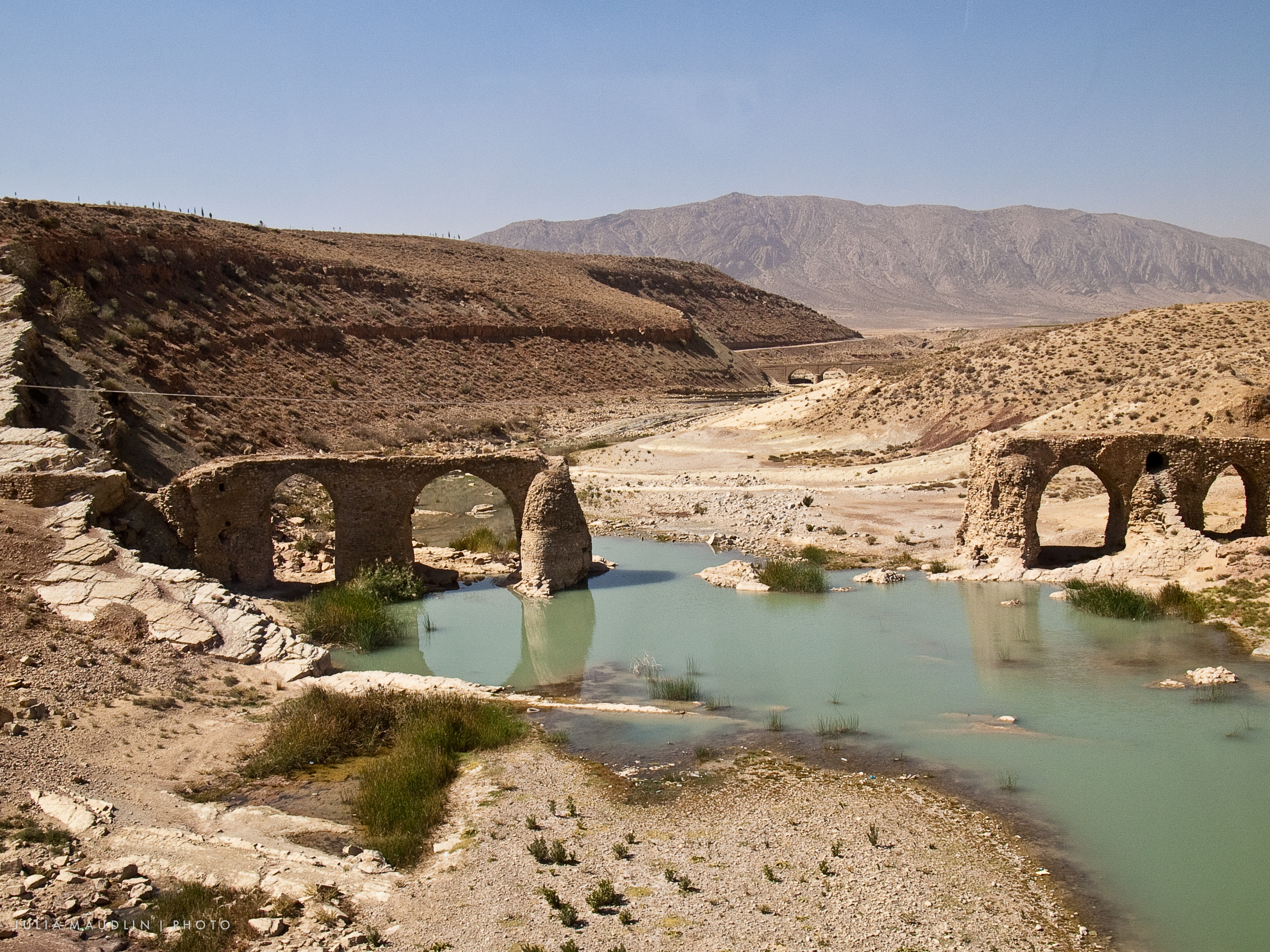
- Kavar Historical Bridge

- Location within Iran
- Coordinates: 29°12′06″N 52°41′30″E
- Country: Iran
- Province: Fars
- County: Kavar
- District: Central

Population (2016)
  - Total: 31,711
- Time zone: UTC+3:30 (IRST)

Kavar (Persian: كوار) (Note: Also romanized as Kavār; also known as Kaval) is a city in the Central District of Kavar County, Fars province, Iran, serving as capital of both the county and the district.

== Demographics ==
=== Population ===
At the time of the 2006 National Census, the city's population was 22,158 in 4,753 households, when it was capital of the former Kavar District of Shiraz County. The following census in 2011 counted 26,342 people in 6,429 households, by which time the district had been separated from the county in the establishment of Kavar County. Kavar was transferred to the new Central District as the county's capital. The 2016 census measured the population of the city as 31,711 people in 8,577 households.

== See also ==
- Ardashir-Khwarrah

== Exterior links ==
http://sasanika.org/esasanika/qalatqobad-fort-a-sasanian-islamic-fort-in-kavar-southeast-of-shiraz/
