= Anjireh, Shiraz =

Neighborhood in Fars province, Iran

Anjireh Persian: انجيره
- Neighborhood
- Location within Iran
- Coordinates: 29°44′04″N 52°27′21″E
- Country: Iran
- Province: Fars
- County: Shiraz
- District: Central
- City: Shiraz

Population (2016)
  - Total: 1,256
- Time zone: UTC+3:30 (IRST)

Anjireh (Persian: انجيره) (Note: Also romanized as Anjīreh) is a neighborhood in the city of Shiraz in the Central District of Shiraz County, Fars province, Iran.

== Demographics ==
=== Population ===
At the time of the 2006 National Census, Anjireh's population was 823 in 211 households, when it was a village in Derak Rural District. The following census in 2011 counted 968 people in 287 households. The 2016 census measured the population of the village as 1,256 people in 380 households.

Anjireh was annexed by the city of Shiraz in 2020.
