= Anjireh, Rostam =

Anjireh انجيره
- Village
- Location within Iran
- Coordinates: 30°20′22″N 51°31′03″E
- Country: Iran
- Province: Fars
- County: Rostam
- Bakhsh: Central
- Rural District: Rostam-e Yek

Population (2006)
  - Total: 155
- Time zone: UTC+3:30 (IRST)
  - Summer (DST): UTC+4:30 (IRDT)

Anjireh (Persian: انجيره, also Romanized as Anjīreh) is a village in Rostam-e Yek Rural District, in the Central District of Rostam County, Fars province, Iran. At the 2006 census, its population was 155, in 35 families.
