= Farmeshkan Rural District =

Rural district in Fars province, Iran

Farmeshkan Rural District Persian: دهستان فرمشكان
- Rural District
- Location within Iran
- Coordinates: 29°07′05″N 52°51′37″E
- Country: Iran
- Province: Fars
- County: Kavar
- District: Central
- Capital: Deh Shib

Population (2016)
  - Total: 5,883
- Time zone: UTC+3:30 (IRST)

Farmeshkan Rural District (Persian: دهستان فرمشكان) is in the Central District of Kavar County, Fars province, Iran. Its capital is the village of Deh Shib.

== Demographics ==
=== Population ===
At the time of the 2006 National Census, the rural district's population (as a part of the former Kavar District of Shiraz County) was 6,300 in 1,429 households. There were 6,220 inhabitants in 1,715 households at the following census of 2011, by which time the district had been separated from the county in the establishment of Kavar County. The rural district was transferred to the new Central District. The 2016 census measured the population of the rural district as 5,883 in 1,809 households. The most populous of its 20 villages was Abadeh Abgarm, with 1,643 people.
