= Kavar District =

Former district in Fars province, Iran

Kavar District Persian: بخش کوار
- Former District
- Location within Iran
- Coordinates: 29°15′N 52°43′E
- Country: Iran
- Province: Fars
- County: Shiraz
- Capital: Kavar

Population (2006)
  - Total: 72,423
- Time zone: UTC+3:30 (IRST)

Kavar District (Persian: بخش کوار) is a former administrative division of Shiraz County, Fars province, Iran. Its capital was the city of Kavar.

== History ==
After the 2006 National Census, the district was separated from the county in the establishment of Kavar County.

== Demographics ==
=== Population ===
At the time of the 2006 census, the district's population was 72,423 in 15,570 households.

=== Administrative divisions ===
Kavar District Population
Administrative Divisions	2006
Farmeshkan RD	6,300
Kavar RD	23,118
Tasuj RD	20,847
Kavar (city)	22,158
Total	72,423
RD = Rural District
