= Kavar Rural District =

Rural district in Fars province, Iran

Kavar Rural District Persian: دهستان كوار
- Rural District
- Location within Iran
- Coordinates: 29°13′11″N 52°46′02″E
- Country: Iran
- Province: Fars
- County: Kavar
- District: Central
- Capital: Nowruzan

Population (2016)
  - Total: 23,120
- Time zone: UTC+3:30 (IRST)

Kavar Rural District (Persian: دهستان كوار) is in the Central District of Kavar County, Fars province, Iran. Its capital is the village of Nowruzan. The previous capital of the rural district was the village of Akbarabad, now a city.

== Demographics ==
=== Population ===
At the time of the 2006 National Census, the rural district's population (as a part of the former Kavar District of Shiraz County) was 23,118 in 4,982 households. There were 23,071 inhabitants in 6,061 households at the following census of 2011, by which time the district had been separated from the county in the establishment of Kavar County. The rural district was transferred to the new Central District. The 2016 census measured the population of the rural district as 23,120 in 6,544 households. The most populous of its 31 villages was Akbarabad (now a city), with 5,817 people.
