= Tasuj Rural District (Kavar County) =

Rural district in Fars province, Iran

Tasuj Rural District Persian: دهستان طسوج
- Rural District
- Location within Iran
- Coordinates: 29°18′37″N 52°42′57″E
- Country: Iran
- Province: Fars
- County: Kavar
- District: Tasuj
- Capital: Tasuj

Population (2016)
  - Total: 11,199
- Time zone: UTC+3:30 (IRST)

Tasuj Rural District (Persian: دهستان طسوج) is in Tasuj District of Kavar County, Fars province, Iran. It is administered from the city of Tasuj.

== Demographics ==
=== Population ===
At the time of the 2006 National Census, the rural district's population (as a part of the former Kavar District of Shiraz County) was 20,847 in 4,406 households. There were 11,059 inhabitants in 2,659 households at the following census of 2011, by which time the district had been separated from the county in the establishment of Kavar County. The rural district was transferred to the new Tasuj District. The 2016 census measured the population of the rural district as 11,199 in 2,813 households. The most populous of its 28 villages was Tasuj (now a city), with 4,555 people.
