= Qorqori District =

District in Sistan and Baluchestan province, Iran

Qorqori District Persian: بخش قرقرئ
- District
- Location within Iran
- Coordinates: 31°17′35″N 61°37′04″E
- Country: Iran
- Province: Sistan and Baluchestan
- County: Hirmand
- Capital: Qorqori

Population (2016)
  - Total: 13,192
- Time zone: UTC+3:30 (IRST)

Qorqori District (Persian: بخش قرقرئ) is in Hirmand County, (Note: Formerly Miyankongi County) Sistan and Baluchestan province, Iran. Its capital is the city of Qorqori.

== History ==
After the 2006 National Census, Miyankongi District was separated from Zabol County in the establishment of Miyankongi County, (Note: Renamed Hirmand County) which was divided into two districts and five rural districts, with Dust Mohammad as its capital and only city at the time. After the 2016 census, the village of Qorqori was elevated to the status of a city.

== Demographics ==
=== Population ===
At the time of the 2011 census, the district's population was 14,544 people in 3,242 households. The 2016 census measured the population of the district as 13,192 inhabitants in 3,492 households.

=== Administrative divisions ===
Qorqori District Population
Administrative Divisions	2011	2016
Akbarabad RD	4,110	4,396
Qorqori RD	10,434	8,796
Qorqori (city) (Note: Became a city after the 2016 census)		
Total	14,544	13,192
RD = Rural District
