= Qorqori Rural District =

Rural district in Sistan and Baluchestan province, Iran

Qorqori Rural District Persian: دهستان قرقرئ
- Rural District
- Location within Iran
- Coordinates: 31°17′24″N 61°40′27″E
- Country: Iran
- Province: Sistan and Baluchestan
- County: Hirmand
- District: Qorqori
- Capital: Qorqori

Population (2016)
  - Total: 8,796
- Time zone: UTC+3:30 (IRST)

Qorqori Rural District (Persian: دهستان قرقرئ) is in Qorqori District of Hirmand County, (Note: Formerly Miyankongi County) Sistan and Baluchestan province, Iran. It is administered from the city of Qorqori.

== Demographics ==
=== Population ===
At the time of the 2006 National Census, the rural district's population (as a part of the former Miyankongi District of Zabol County) was 15,172 in 3,074 households. There were 10,434 inhabitants in 2,300 households at the following census of 2011, by which time the district had been separated from the county in the establishment of Miyankongi County. (Note: Renamed Hirmand County) The rural district was transferred to the new Qorqori District. The 2016 census measured the population of the rural district as 8,796 in 2,461 households. The most populous of its 54 villages was Qorqori (now a city), with 1,329 people.
