= Central District (Kavar County) =

District in Fars province, Iran

Central District (Kavar County) Persian: بخش مرکزی شهرستان کوار
- District
- Location within Iran
- Coordinates: 29°10′52″N 52°49′40″E
- Country: Iran
- Province: Fars
- County: Kavar
- Capital: Kavar

Population (2016)
  - Total: 60,714
- Time zone: UTC+3:30 (IRST)

The Central District of Kavar County (Persian: بخش مرکزی شهرستان کوار) is in Fars province, Iran. Its capital is the city of Kavar.

== History ==
In 2010, Kavar District was separated from Shiraz County in the establishment of Kavar County, which was divided into two districts of two rural districts each, with Kavar as its capital and only city at the time.

After the 2016 National Census, the villages of Akbarabad and Mozaffari were elevated to city status.

== Demographics ==
=== Population ===
At the time of the 2011 census, the district's population was 55,633 people in 14,205 households. The 2016 census measured the population of the district as 60,714 in 16,930 households.

=== Administrative divisions ===
Central District (Kavar County) Population
Administrative Divisions	2011	2016
Farmeshkan RD	6,220	5,883
Kavar RD	23,071	23,120
Akbarabad (city) (Note: Became a city after the 2016 census)		
Kavar (city)	26,342	31,711
Mozaffari (city)		
Total	55,633	60,714
RD = Rural District
