= Kavar County =

County in Fars province, Iran

Kavar County Persian: شهرستان کوار
- County
- Location of Kavar County in Fars province (center left, green)

- Location of Fars province in Iran
- Coordinates: 29°15′N 52°43′E
- Country: Iran
- Province: Fars
- Capital: Kavar
- Districts: Central, Tasuj

Population (2016)
  - Total: 83,883
- Time zone: UTC+3:30

Kavar County (Persian: شهرستان کوار) is in Fars province, Iran. Its capital is the city of Kavar.

== History ==
In 2010, Kavar District was separated from Shiraz County in the establishment of Kavar County, which was divided into two districts of two rural districts each, with Kavar as its capital and only city at the time.

After the 2016 National Census, the villages of Akbarabad, Mozaffari, and Tasuj were elevated to city status.

== Demographics ==
=== Population ===
At the time of the 2011 census, the county's population was 77,836 people in 19,681 households. The 2016 census measured the population of the county as 83,883 in 23,013 households.

=== Administrative divisions ===
Kavar County's population history and administrative structure over two consecutive censuses are shown in the following table.

Kavar County Population
Administrative Divisions	2011	2016
Central District	55,633	60,714
Farmeshkan RD	6,220	5,883
Kavar RD	23,071	23,120
Akbarabad (city) (Note: Became a city after the 2016 census)		
Kavar (city)	26,342	31,711
Mozaffari (city)		
Tasuj District	21,902	23,159
Fathabad RD	10,843	11,960
Tasuj RD	11,059	11,199
Tasuj (city) (Note: Became a city after the 2016 census)		
Total	77,836	83,883
RD = Rural District

== See also ==
Media related to Kavar County at Wikimedia Commons
