= Dozak =

Dozak or Dezak (Persian: دزک) may refer to:

- Dezak, Chaharmahal and Bakhtiari
- Dezak-e Olya, Chaharmahal and Bakhtiari province
- Dezak-e Sofla, Chaharmahal and Bakhtiari province
- Dezak-e Sarcheshmeh, Chaharmahal and Bakhtiari province
- Dezak, Fars
- Dezak, Khuzestan
- Dozak, Hormozgan
- Dozak, Kohgiluyeh and Boyer-Ahmad
- Dezak, Sistan and Baluchestan
- Dezak, South Khorasan

== See also ==
- Dezg (disambiguation)
- Dozdak (disambiguation)
