= Dozdak =

Dozdak or Dezdak or Dazdak (Persian: دزدک) may refer to:

- Dozdak-e Olya, Chaharmahal and Bakhtiari Province
- Dozdak-e Sofla, Chaharmahal and Bakhtiari Province
- Dozdak-e Kuchek, Fars Province
- Dazdak, Gilan
- Dozdak, Lahijan, Gilan Province
- Dezdak, Kohgiluyeh, Kohgiluyeh and Boyer-Ahmad Province
- Dozdak, Dana, Kohgiluyeh and Boyer-Ahmad Province
- Dozdak, Nowshahr, Mazandaran Province
- Dozdak, Sari, Mazandaran Province

== See also ==
- Dezg (disambiguation)
- Dozak (disambiguation)
