= Chahar Qash =

Chahar Qash (Persian: چهارقاش) may refer to:

- Chahar Qash, Fars
- Chahar Qash-e Talkhab, Fars Province
- Chahar Qash, Andika, Khuzestan Province
- Chahar Qash (32°00′ N 49°53′ E), Izeh, Khuzestan Province
- Chahar Qash (32°03′ N 49°47′ E), Izeh, Khuzestan Province
- Chahar Qash, Masjed Soleyman, Khuzestan Province
