= Showsani =

Showsani شوسني
- Village
- Location within Iran
- Coordinates: 30°13′17″N 51°32′05″E
- Country: Iran
- Province: Fars
- County: Rostam
- Bakhsh: Central
- Rural District: Rostam-e Yek

Population (2006)
  - Total: 1,172
- Time zone: UTC+3:30 (IRST)
  - Summer (DST): UTC+4:30 (IRDT)

Showsani (Persian: شوسني, also Romanized as Showsanī; also known as Shāh Hasan and Shāh Ḩasanī) is a village in Rostam-e Yek Rural District, in the Central District of Rostam County, Fars province, Iran. At the 2006 census, its population was 1,172, in 283 families.
