= Nowgak =

Nowgak نوگك
- Village
- Location within Iran
- Coordinates: 30°24′04″N 51°20′16″E
- Country: Iran
- Province: Fars
- County: Rostam
- Bakhsh: Sorna
- Rural District: Rostam-e Seh

Population (2006)
  - Total: 535
- Time zone: UTC+3:30 (IRST)
  - Summer (DST): UTC+4:30 (IRDT)

Nowgak (Persian: نوگك, also Romanized as Naogak and Naugak; also known as Qal‘eh-ye Nowkak) is a village in Rostam-e Seh Rural District, Sorna District, Rostam County, Fars province, Iran. At the 2006 census, its population was 535, in 111 families.
