= Zir Anay =

Zir Anay (Persian: زيرعناي), also rendered as Zir Ana, may refer to:

- Zir Anay-e Olya
- Zir Anay-e Sofla

== See also ==
- Zirna, village in Kohgiluyeh and Boyer-Ahmad, Iran
