= Tang-e Chuk =

Tang-e Chuk تنگ چوك
- Village
- Location within Iran
- Coordinates: 30°31′34″N 51°14′38″E
- Country: Iran
- Province: Fars
- County: Rostam
- Bakhsh: Sorna
- Rural District: Poshtkuh-e Rostam

Population (2006)
  - Total: 145
- Time zone: UTC+3:30 (IRST)
  - Summer (DST): UTC+4:30 (IRDT)

Tang-e Chuk (Persian: تنگ چوك, also Romanized as Tang-e Chūk; also known as Tang-e Chūg) is a village in Poshtkuh-e Rostam Rural District, Sorna District, Rostam County, Fars province, Iran. At the 2006 census, its population was 145, in 31 families.
