= Kupon =

Kupon or Kupan or Kupen (Persian: كوپن), also rendered as Kupun, may refer to:

- Kupon-e Olya
- Kupon-e Sofla
- Kupon-e Vosta

== See also ==
- Coupon
