= Hoseynabad-e Rostam =

Village in Fars province, Iran

Hoseynabad-e Rostam Persian: حسین‌آباد رستم
- Village
- Location within Iran
- Coordinates: 30°21′45″N 51°18′17″E
- Country: Iran
- Province: Fars
- County: Rostam
- District: Sorna
- Rural District: Rostam-e Seh

Population (2016)
  - Total: 1,795
- Time zone: UTC+3:30 (IRST)

Hoseynabad-e Rostam (Persian: حسین‌آباد رستم) (Note: Also romanized as Ḩoseynābād-e Rostam; also known as Ḩoseynābād) is a village in Rostam-e Seh Rural District of Sorna District, Rostam County, Fars province, Iran.

== Demographics ==
=== Population ===
At the time of the 2006 National Census, the village's population was 1,450 in 269 households, when it was in the former Rostam District of Mamasani County. The following census in 2011 counted 1,352 people in 345 households, by which time the district had been separated from the county in the establishment of Rostam County. The rural district was transferred to the new Sorna District. The 2016 census measured the population of the village as 1,795 people in 519 households. It was the most populous village in its rural district.
