= Melleh Khik Andeh =

Melleh Khik Andeh مله خيكنده
- Village
- Country: Iran
- Province: Fars
- County: Rostam
- Bakhsh: Sorna
- Rural District: Poshtkuh-e Rostam

Population (2006)
  - Total: 330
- Time zone: UTC+3:30 (IRST)
  - Summer (DST): UTC+4:30 (IRDT)

Melleh Khik Andeh (Persian: مله خيكنده, also Romanized as Melleh Khīk Andeh) is a village in Poshtkuh-e Rostam Rural District, Sorna District, Rostam County, Fars province, Iran. At the 2006 census, its population was 330, in 55 families.
