= Dezg =

Dezg or Dezag or Desok or Dozq (Persian: دزگ or دزك) may refer to various places in Iran:

- Dezak, Chaharmahal and Bakhtiari
- Dezak-e Olya, Chaharmahal and Bakhtiari Province
- Dezak-e Sofla, Chaharmahal and Bakhtiari Province
- Dezak-e Sarcheshmeh, Chaharmahal and Bakhtiari Province
- Dezak, Khuzestan
- Dezg-e Bala, South Khorasan Province
- Dezg-e Pain, South Khorasan Province

== See also ==
- Dozak (disambiguation)
- Dozdak (disambiguation)
