= Fakhr Makan =

Fakhr Makan فخرمكان
- Village
- Location within Iran
- Coordinates: 30°20′46″N 51°17′53″E
- Country: Iran
- Province: Fars
- County: Rostam
- Bakhsh: Sorna
- Rural District: Rostam-e Seh

Population (2006)
  - Total: 154
- Time zone: UTC+3:30 (IRST)
  - Summer (DST): UTC+4:30 (IRDT)

Fakhr Makan (Persian: فخرمكان, also Romanized as Fakhr Makān) is a village in Rostam-e Seh Rural District, Sorna District, Rostam County, Fars province, Iran. At the 2006 census, its population was 154, in 28 families.
