= Shahrak-e Gudarz =

Shahrak-e Gudarz شهرك گودرز
- Village
- Location within Iran
- Coordinates: 30°15′34″N 51°28′32″E
- Country: Iran
- Province: Fars
- County: Rostam
- Bakhsh: Central
- Rural District: Rostam-e Yek

Population (2006)
  - Total: 547
- Time zone: UTC+3:30 (IRST)
  - Summer (DST): UTC+4:30 (IRDT)

Shahrak-e Gudarz (Persian: شهرك گودرز, also Romanized as Shahrak-e Gūdarz) is a village in Rostam-e Yek Rural District, in the Central District of Rostam County, Fars province, Iran. At the 2006 census, its population was 547, in 118 families.
