= Kal Ghur =

Kal Ghur كل غور
- Village
- Location within Iran
- Coordinates: 30°27′24″N 51°27′05″E
- Country: Iran
- Province: Fars
- County: Rostam
- Bakhsh: Central
- Rural District: Rostam-e Yek

Population (2006)
  - Total: 56
- Time zone: UTC+3:30 (IRST)
  - Summer (DST): UTC+4:30 (IRDT)

Kal Ghur (Persian: كل غور, also Romanized as Kal Ghūr; also known as Kalah Ghūr) is a village in Rostam-e Yek Rural District, in the Central District of Rostam County, Fars province, Iran. At the 2006 census, its population was 56, in 14 families.
