= Bakaldun-e Gholam Shah =

Bakaldun-e Gholam Shah بكلدون غلامشاه
- Village
- Country: Iran
- Province: Fars
- County: Rostam
- Bakhsh: Central
- Rural District: Rostam-e Yek

Population (2006)
  - Total: 23
- Time zone: UTC+3:30 (IRST)
  - Summer (DST): UTC+4:30 (IRDT)

Bakaldun-e Gholam Shah (Persian: بكلدون غلامشاه, also Romanized as Bakaldūn-e Gholām Shāh) is a village in Rostam-e Yek Rural District, in the Central District of Rostam County, Fars province, Iran. At the 2006 census, its population was 23, in 5 families.
