= Paskahak =

Paskahak پس كهك
- Village
- Location within Iran
- Coordinates: 30°18′00″N 51°30′15″E
- Country: Iran
- Province: Fars
- County: Rostam
- Bakhsh: Central
- Rural District: Rostam-e Yek

Population (2006)
  - Total: 240
- Time zone: UTC+3:30 (IRST)
  - Summer (DST): UTC+4:30 (IRDT)

Paskahak (Persian: پس كهك) is a village in Rostam-e Yek Rural District, in the Central District of Rostam County, Fars province, Iran. At the 2006 census, its population was 240, in 44 families.

== See also ==
- List of cities, towns and villages in Fars province
