= Ab Sefid =

Ab Sefid اب سفيد
- Village
- Location within Iran
- Coordinates: 30°25′09″N 51°29′27″E
- Country: Iran
- Province: Fars
- County: Rostam
- Bakhsh: Central
- Rural District: Rostam-e Yek

Population (2006)
  - Total: 36
- Time zone: UTC+3:30 (IRST)
  - Summer (DST): UTC+4:30 (IRDT)

Ab Sefid (Persian: اب سفيد, also Romanized as Āb Sefīd) is a village in Rostam-e Yek Rural District, in the Central District of Rostam County, Fars province, Iran. At the 2006 census, its population was 36, in 7 families.
