= Shah Jahan Ahmad =

Shah Jahan Ahmad شاه جهان احمد
- Village
- Location within Iran
- Coordinates: 30°12′19″N 51°31′55″E
- Country: Iran
- Province: Fars
- County: Rostam
- Bakhsh: Central
- Rural District: Rostam-e Yek

Population (2006)
  - Total: 137
- Time zone: UTC+3:30 (IRST)
  - Summer (DST): UTC+4:30 (IRDT)

Shah Jahan Ahmad (Persian: شاه جهان احمد, also Romanized as Shāh Jahān Aḩmad) is a village in Rostam-e Yek Rural District, in the Central District of Rostam County, Fars province, Iran. At the 2006 census, its population was 137, in 30 families.
