= Mir Kheyrollah =

Mir Kheyrollah ميرخيراله
- Village
- Location within Iran
- Coordinates: 30°14′00″N 51°33′42″E
- Country: Iran
- Province: Fars
- County: Rostam
- Bakhsh: Central
- Rural District: Rostam-e Yek

Population (2006)
  - Total: 257
- Time zone: UTC+3:30 (IRST)
  - Summer (DST): UTC+4:30 (IRDT)

Mir Kheyrollah (Persian: ميرخيراله, also Romanized as Mīr Kheyrollah and Mīrkhīrallah) is a village in Rostam-e Yek Rural District, in the Central District of Rostam County, Fars province, Iran. At the 2006 census, its population was 257, in 57 families.
