= Gol Babakan =

Gol Babakan گل باباكان
- Village
- Location within Iran
- Coordinates: 30°26′04″N 51°22′29″E
- Country: Iran
- Province: Fars
- County: Rostam
- Bakhsh: Sorna
- Rural District: Poshtkuh-e Rostam

Population (2006)
  - Total: 645
- Time zone: UTC+3:30 (IRST)
  - Summer (DST): UTC+4:30 (IRDT)

Gol Babakan (Persian: گل باباكان, also Romanized as Gol Bābākān and Gol Bābakān; also known as Golpāyegān) is a village in Poshtkuh-e Rostam Rural District, Sorna District, Rostam County, Fars province, Iran. At the 2006 census, its population was 645, in 105 families.
