= Cheshmeh Bari =

Cheshmeh Bari چشمه بري
- Village
- Country: Iran
- Province: Fars
- County: Rostam
- Bakhsh: Sorna
- Rural District: Poshtkuh-e Rostam

Population (2006)
  - Total: 61
- Time zone: UTC+3:30 (IRST)
  - Summer (DST): UTC+4:30 (IRDT)

Cheshmeh Bari (Persian: چشمه بري, also Romanized as Cheshmeh Barī) is a village in Poshtkuh-e Rostam Rural District, Sorna District, Rostam County, Fars province, Iran. At the 2006 census, its population was 61, in 10 families.
