= Pay Taft Jalil =

Pay toof Jalil پاي طوف جليل
- Village
- Country: Iran
- Province: Fars
- County: Rostam
- Bakhsh: Sorna
- Rural District: Poshtkuh-e Rostam

Population (2006)
  - Total: 23
- Time zone: UTC+3:30 (IRST)
  - Summer (DST): UTC+4:30 (IRDT)

Pay toof Jalil (Persian: پاي طوف جليل, also Romanized as Pāy toof Jalīl) is a village in Poshtkuh-e Rostam Rural District, Sorna District, Rostam County, Fars province, Iran. At the 2006 census, its population was 23, in 4 families.
