= Deli Amin Nazer =

Deli Amin Nazer دلي امين نذر
- Village
- Location within Iran
- Coordinates: 30°21′58″N 51°24′40″E
- Country: Iran
- Province: Fars
- County: Rostam
- Bakhsh: Sorna
- Rural District: Poshtkuh-e Rostam

Population (2006)
  - Total: 109
- Time zone: UTC+3:30 (IRST)
  - Summer (DST): UTC+4:30 (IRDT)

Deli Amin Nazer (Persian: دلي امين نذر, also Romanized as Delī Amīn Naz̄er; also known as Delī Rengak, Dolī Pīk, Dolī Rangak, and Dolī Rangak-e Amīn Naz̄ar) is a village in Poshtkuh-e Rostam Rural District, Sorna District, Rostam County, Fars province, Iran. At the 2006 census, its population was 109, in 17 families.
