= Abdollahi-ye Olya =

Abdollahi-ye Olya عبدالهي عليا
- Village
- Location within Iran
- Coordinates: 30°12′03″N 51°31′31″E
- Country: Iran
- Province: Fars
- County: Rostam
- Bakhsh: Central
- Rural District: Rostam-e Yek

Population (2006)
  - Total: 597
- Time zone: UTC+3:30 (IRST)
  - Summer (DST): UTC+4:30 (IRDT)

Abdollahi-ye Olya (Persian: عبدالهي عليا, also Romanized as 'Abdollāhī-ye 'Olyā; also known as 'Abdollāhī-ye Bālā) is a village in Rostam-e Yek Rural District, in the Central District of Rostam County, Fars province, Iran. At the 2006 census, its population was 597, in 137 families.
