= Zirgar-e Owl Luyi =

Zirgar-e Owl Luyi زيرگر اول لويي
- Village
- Country: Iran
- Province: Fars
- County: Rostam
- Bakhsh: Central
- Rural District: Rostam-e Do

Population (2006)
  - Total: 39
- Time zone: UTC+3:30 (IRST)
  - Summer (DST): UTC+4:30 (IRDT)

Zirgar-e Owl Luyi (Persian: زيرگر اول لويي, also romanized as Zīrgar-e Owl Lūyī) is a village in Rostam-e Do Rural District, in the Central District of Rostam County, Fars province, Iran. At the 2006 census, its population was 39.
