= Do Konarun-e Zirdu =

Do Konarun-e Zirdu دوكنارون زيردو
- Village
- Location within Iran
- Coordinates: 30°14′38″N 51°25′02″E
- Country: Iran
- Province: Fars
- County: Rostam
- Bakhsh: Central
- Rural District: Rostam-e Yek

Population (2006)
  - Total: 286
- Time zone: UTC+3:30 (IRST)
  - Summer (DST): UTC+4:30 (IRDT)

Do Konarun-e Zirdu (Persian: دوكنارون زيردو, also Romanized as Do Konārūn-e Zīrdū; also known as Do Konarān, Do Konārūn, and Tūgeh Do Konārūn) is a village in Rostam-e Yek Rural District, in the Central District of Rostam County, Fars province, Iran. At the 2006 census, its population was 286, in 56 families.
