= Deli Bik =

Deli Bik دلي بيك
- Village
- Location within Iran
- Coordinates: 30°16′40″N 51°20′27″E
- Country: Iran
- Province: Fars
- County: Rostam
- Bakhsh: Sorna
- Rural District: Rostam-e Seh

Population (2006)
  - Total: 41
- Time zone: UTC+3:30 (IRST)
  - Summer (DST): UTC+4:30 (IRDT)

Deli Bik (Persian: دلي بيك, also Romanized as Delī Bīk; also known as Delī Beyg) is a village in Rostam-e Seh Rural District, Sorna District, Rostam County, Fars province, Iran. At the 2006 census, its population was 41, in 9 families.
