= Babagushi =

Babagushi باباگوشي
- Village
- Location within Iran
- Coordinates: 30°25′09″N 51°30′26″E
- Country: Iran
- Province: Fars
- County: Rostam
- Bakhsh: Central
- Rural District: Rostam-e Yek

Population (2006)
  - Total: 30
- Time zone: UTC+3:30 (IRST)
  - Summer (DST): UTC+4:30 (IRDT)

Babagushi (Persian: باباگوشي, also Romanized as Bābāgūshī; also known as Bāgūshī) is a village in Rostam-e Yek Rural District, in the Central District of Rostam County, Fars province, Iran. At the 2006 census, its population was 30, in 6 families.
