= Qaleh-ye Murd =

Qaleh-ye Murd قلعه مورد
- Village
- Location within Iran
- Coordinates: 30°28′36″N 51°20′05″E
- Country: Iran
- Province: Fars
- County: Rostam
- Bakhsh: Sorna
- Rural District: Poshtkuh-e Rostam

Population (2006)
  - Total: 114
- Time zone: UTC+3:30 (IRST)
  - Summer (DST): UTC+4:30 (IRDT)

Qaleh-ye Murd (Persian: قلعه مورد, also Romanized as Qal‘eh-ye Mūrd) is a village in Poshtkuh-e Rostam Rural District, Sorna District, Rostam County, Fars province, Iran. At the 2006 census, its population was 114, in 21 families.
