= Gardan Qalat =

Gardan Qalat گردن قلات
- Village
- Location within Iran
- Coordinates: 30°20′50″N 51°32′22″E
- Country: Iran
- Province: Fars
- County: Rostam
- Bakhsh: Central
- Rural District: Rostam-e Yek

Population (2006)
  - Total: 74
- Time zone: UTC+3:30 (IRST)
  - Summer (DST): UTC+4:30 (IRDT)

Gardan Qalat (Persian: گردن قلات, also Romanized as Gardan Qalāt) is a village in Rostam-e Yek Rural District, in the Central District of Rostam County, Fars province, Iran. At the 2006 census, its population was 74, in 16 families.
