= Kupon-e Vosta =

Neighborhood in Fars province, Iran

Kupon-e Vosta Persian: كوپن وسطي
- Neighborhood
- Location within Iran
- Coordinates: 30°19′56″N 51°17′02″E
- Country: Iran
- Province: Fars
- County: Rostam
- District: Sorna
- City: Kupon

Population (2011)
  - Total: 559
- Time zone: UTC+3:30 (IRST)

Kupon-e Vosta (Persian: كوپن وسطي) (Note: Also romanized as Kūpon-e Vosţá; also known as Kovīn-e Vasaţ, Kūpān-e Vosţá, and Kūpon-e Mīānī) is a neighborhood in the city of Kupon in Sorna District of Rostam County, Fars province, Iran.

== Demographics ==
=== Population ===
At the time of the 2006 National Census, Kupon-e Vosta's population was 568 in 111 households, when it was a village in Rostam-e Seh Rural District of the former Rostam District of Mamasani County. The following census in 2011 counted 559 people in 141 households, by which time the district had been separated from the county in the establishment of Rostam County. The rural district was transferred to the new Sorna District.

After the census, the villages of Kupon-e Olya, Kupon-e Sofla, and Kupon-e Vosta were merged to form the city of Kupon.
