= Kar Ashub =

Kar Ashub كراشوب
- Village
- Location within Iran
- Coordinates: 30°13′02″N 51°30′33″E
- Country: Iran
- Province: Fars
- County: Rostam
- Bakhsh: Central
- Rural District: Rostam-e Yek

Population (2006)
  - Total: 164
- Time zone: UTC+3:30 (IRST)
  - Summer (DST): UTC+4:30 (IRDT)

Kar Ashub (Persian: كراشوب, also Romanized as Kar Āshūb; also known as Karāshb and Karāshū) is a village in Rostam-e Yek Rural District, in the Central District of Rostam County, Fars province, Iran. At the 2006 census, its population was 164, in 34 families.
