= Si La, Iran =

Si La سي لا
- Village
- Location within Iran
- Coordinates: 30°27′32″N 51°24′14″E
- Country: Iran
- Province: Fars
- County: Rostam
- Bakhsh: Sorna
- Rural District: Poshtkuh-e Rostam

Population (2006)
  - Total: 20
- Time zone: UTC+3:30 (IRST)
  - Summer (DST): UTC+4:30 (IRDT)

Si La (Persian: سي لا, also Romanized as Sī Lā) is a village in Poshtkuh-e Rostam Rural District, Sorna District, Rostam County, Fars province, Iran. At the 2006 census, its population was 20, in 4 families.
