= Dehnow-e Moqimi =

Village in Fars province, Iran

Dehnow-e Moqimi Persian: دهنو مقيمي
- Village
- Location within Iran
- Coordinates: 30°19′08″N 51°23′20″E
- Country: Iran
- Province: Fars
- County: Rostam
- District: Central
- Rural District: Rostam-e Do

Population (2016)
  - Total: 872
- Time zone: UTC+3:30 (IRST)

Dehnow-e Moqimi (Persian: دهنومقيمي) (Note: Also romanized as Dehnow-e Moqīmī; also known as Deh Now-e Pā’īn, Deh-i-Nau, and Dehnow) is a village in, and the capital of, Rostam-e Do Rural District of the Central District of Rostam County, Fars province, Iran.

== Demographics ==
=== Population ===
At the time of the 2006 National Census, the village's population was 906 in 156 households, when it was in the former Rostam District of Mamasani County. The following census in 2011 counted 1,036 people in 248 households, by which time the district had been separated from the county in the establishment of Rostam County. The rural district was transferred to the new Central District. The 2016 census measured the population of the village as 872 people in 248 households.
