= Zameni =

Zameni ضامني
- Village
- Location within Iran
- Coordinates: 30°13′52″N 51°32′17″E
- Country: Iran
- Province: Fars
- County: Rostam
- Bakhsh: Central
- Rural District: Rostam-e Yek

Population (2006)
  - Total: 891
- Time zone: UTC+3:30 (IRST)
  - Summer (DST): UTC+4:30 (IRDT)

Zameni (Persian: ضامني, also Romanized as Ẕāmenī and Zamenī; also known as Ẕāmenī-ye Bālā and Zāmenī-ye 'Olyā) is a village in Rostam-e Yek Rural District, in the Central District of Rostam County, Fars province, Iran. At the 2006 census, its population was 891, in 196 families.
