= Baba Meydan =

Baba Meydan or Babameydan (Persian: باباميدان), also known as Ba Meydan, may refer to:

- Baba Meydan-e Olya
- Baba Meydan-e Sofla
- Baba Meydan-e Zirrah
