= Naseh Anjireh =

Naseh Anjireh نسه انجيره
- Village
- Location within Iran
- Coordinates: 30°20′47″N 51°30′40″E
- Country: Iran
- Province: Fars
- County: Rostam
- Bakhsh: Central
- Rural District: Rostam-e Yek

Population (2006)
  - Total: 117
- Time zone: UTC+3:30 (IRST)
  - Summer (DST): UTC+4:30 (IRDT)

Naseh Anjireh (Persian: نسه انجيره, also Romanized as Naseh Anjīreh) is a village in Rostam-e Yek Rural District, in the Central District of Rostam County, Fars province, Iran. At the 2006 census, its population was 117, in 23 families.
