= Tol-e Pir =

Tol-e Pir تل پير
- Village
- Location within Iran
- Coordinates: 30°16′13″N 51°29′56″E
- Country: Iran
- Province: Fars
- County: Rostam
- Bakhsh: Central
- Rural District: Rostam-e Yek

Population (2006)
  - Total: 132
- Time zone: UTC+3:30 (IRST)
  - Summer (DST): UTC+4:30 (IRDT)

Tol-e Pir (Persian: تل پير, also Romanized as Tol-e Pīr) is a village in Rostam-e Yek Rural District, in the Central District of Rostam County, Fars province, Iran. At the 2006 census, its population was 132, in 26 families.
