= Tang-e Mohammad Saleh =

Tang-e Mohammad Saleh تنگ محمدصالح
- Village
- Location within Iran
- Coordinates: 30°17′50″N 51°29′42″E
- Country: Iran
- Province: Fars
- County: Rostam
- Bakhsh: Central
- Rural District: Rostam-e Yek

Population (2006)
  - Total: 30
- Time zone: UTC+3:30 (IRST)
  - Summer (DST): UTC+4:30 (IRDT)

Tang-e Mohammad Saleh (Persian: تنگ محمدصالح, also Romanized as Tang-e Moḩammad Şāleḩ) is a village in Rostam-e Yek Rural District, in the Central District of Rostam County, Fars province, Iran. At the 2006 census, its population was 30, in 4 families.
