= Pehun =

Village in Fars province, Iran

Pehun Persian: پهون
- Village
- Location within Iran
- Coordinates: 30°29′40″N 51°18′20″E
- Country: Iran
- Province: Fars
- County: Rostam
- District: Sorna
- Rural District: Poshtkuh-e Rostam

Population (2016)
  - Total: 930
- Time zone: UTC+3:30 (IRST)

Pehun (Persian: پهون) (Note: Also romanized as Pehūn) is a village in Poshtkuh-e Rostam Rural District (Note: Formerly Poshtkuh-e Mamasani Rural District) of Sorna District, Rostam County, Fars province, Iran.

== Demographics ==
=== Population ===
At the time of the 2006 National Census, the village's population was 895 in 154 households, when it was in the former Rostam District of Mamasani County. The following census in 2011 counted 988 people in 233 households, by which time the district had been separated from the county in the establishment of Rostam County. The rural district was transferred to the new Sorna District. The 2016 census measured the population of the village as 930 people in 237 households. It was the most populous village in its rural district.
