= Kupon-e Olya =

Neighborhood in Fars province, Iran

Kupon-e Olya Persian: كوپن عليا
- Neighborhood
- Location within Iran
- Coordinates: 30°20′09″N 51°17′28″E
- Country: Iran
- Province: Fars
- County: Rostam
- District: Sorna
- City: Kupon

Population (2011)
  - Total: 2,427
- Time zone: UTC+3:30 (IRST)

Kupon-e Olya (Persian: كوپن عليا) (Note: Also romanized as Kūpon-e ‘Olyā; also known as Kūpān, Kūpān-e ‘Olyā, and Kūpon-e Bālā) is a neighborhood in the city of Kupon in Sorna District of Rostam County, Fars province, Iran. It was the capital of Rostam-e Seh Rural District until its administrative center was transferred to Kupon.

== Demographics ==
=== Population ===
At the time of the 2006 National Census, Kupon-e Olya's population was 2,357 in 446 households, when it was a village in Rostam-e Seh Rural District of the former Rostam District of Mamasani County. The following census in 2011 counted 2,427 people in 623 households, by which time the district had been separated from the county in the establishment of Rostam County. The rural district was transferred to the new Sorna District.

After the census, the villages of Kupon-e Olya, Kupon-e Sofla, and Kupon-e Vosta were merged to form the city of Kupon.
