= Shahrak-e Dehnow =

Shahrak-e Dehnow شهرك دهنو
- Village
- Location within Iran
- Coordinates: 30°19′24″N 51°23′20″E
- Country: Iran
- Province: Fars
- County: Rostam
- Bakhsh: Central
- Rural District: Rostam-e Do

Population (2006)
  - Total: 247
- Time zone: UTC+3:30 (IRST)
  - Summer (DST): UTC+4:30 (IRDT)

Shahrak-e Dehnow (Persian: شهرك دهنو; also known as Shahrak-e Dehnow-ye Moqīmī) is a village in Rostam-e Do Rural District, in the Central District of Rostam County, Fars province, Iran. At the 2006 census, its population was 247, in 47 families.
