= Chahar Taq, Rostam =

Village in Fars province, Iran

Chahar Taq Persian: چهارطاق
- Village
- Location within Iran
- Coordinates: 30°24′06″N 51°22′07″E
- Country: Iran
- Province: Fars
- County: Rostam
- District: Sorna
- Rural District: Poshtkuh-e Rostam

Population (2016)
  - Total: 214
- Time zone: UTC+3:30 (IRST)

Chahar Taq (Persian: چهارطاق) (Note: Also romanized as Chahār Ţāq) is a village in, and the capital of, Poshtkuh-e Rostam Rural District (Note: Formerly Poshtkuh-e Mamasani Rural District) of Sorna District, Rostam County, Fars province, Iran.

== Demographics ==
=== Population ===
At the time of the 2006 National Census, the village's population was 161 in 31 households, when it was in the former Rostam District of Mamasani County. The following census in 2011 counted 196 people in 44 households, by which time the district had been separated from the county in the establishment of Rostam County. The rural district was transferred to the new Sorna District. The 2016 census measured the population of the village as 214 people in 59 households.
