= Shir Khvoshi-ye Sofla =

Shir Khvoshi-ye Sofla شير خوشي سفلي
- Village
- Location within Iran
- Coordinates: 30°27′27″N 51°17′15″E
- Country: Iran
- Province: Fars
- County: Rostam
- Bakhsh: Sorna
- Rural District: Poshtkuh-e Rostam

Population (2006)
  - Total: 39
- Time zone: UTC+3:30 (IRST)
  - Summer (DST): UTC+4:30 (IRDT)

Shir Khvoshi-ye Sofla (Persian: شير خوشي سفلي, also Romanized as Shīr Khvoshī-ye Soflá; also known as Shīr Khvosī, Shīrkhvosī-ye Pā’īn, and Shīrkhvoy-e Soflá) is a village in Poshtkuh-e Rostam Rural District, Sorna District, Rostam County, Fars province, Iran. At the 2006 census, its population was 39, in 7 families.
