= Darreh Murdi =

Darreh Murdi دره موردي
- Village
- Location within Iran
- Coordinates: 30°19′00″N 51°29′00″E
- Country: Iran
- Province: Fars
- County: Rostam
- Bakhsh: Central
- Rural District: Rostam-e Yek

Population (2006)
  - Total: 48
- Time zone: UTC+3:30 (IRST)
  - Summer (DST): UTC+4:30 (IRDT)

Darreh Murdi (Persian: دره موردي, also Romanized as Darreh Mūrdī) is a village in Rostam-e Yek Rural District, in the Central District of Rostam County, Fars province, Iran. At the 2006 census, its population was 48, in 9 families.
