= Karmard =

Karmard كارمرد
- Village
- Location within Iran
- Coordinates: 30°29′37″N 51°19′11″E
- Country: Iran
- Province: Fars
- County: Rostam
- Bakhsh: Sorna
- Rural District: Poshtkuh-e Rostam

Population (2006)
  - Total: 82
- Time zone: UTC+3:30 (IRST)
  - Summer (DST): UTC+4:30 (IRDT)

Karmard (Persian: كارمرد, also Romanized as Kārmard) is a village in Poshtkuh-e Rostam Rural District, Sorna District, Rostam County, Fars province, Iran. At the 2006 census, its population was 82, in 16 families.
