= Naseh =

Naseh نسه
- Village
- Location within Iran
- Coordinates: 30°15′32″N 51°24′11″E
- Country: Iran
- Province: Fars
- County: Rostam
- Bakhsh: Central
- Rural District: Rostam-e Yek

Population (2006)
  - Total: 182
- Time zone: UTC+3:30 (IRST)
  - Summer (DST): UTC+4:30 (IRDT)

Naseh (Persian: نسه; also known as Naseh Bakhs) is a village in Rostam-e Yek Rural District, in the Central District of Rostam County, Fars province, Iran. At the 2006 census, its population was 182, in 35 families.
