= Molay-ye Sefid =

Molay-ye Sefid ملاي سفيد
- Village
- Location within Iran
- Coordinates: 30°29′31″N 51°19′35″E
- Country: Iran
- Province: Fars
- County: Rostam
- Bakhsh: Sorna
- Rural District: Poshtkuh-e Rostam

Population (2006)
  - Total: 51
- Time zone: UTC+3:30 (IRST)
  - Summer (DST): UTC+4:30 (IRDT)

Molay-ye Sefid (Persian: ملاي سفيد, also Romanized as Molāy-ye Sefīd; also known as Molah-ye Sefīd and Mollā-ye Sefīd) is a village in Poshtkuh-e Rostam Rural District, Sorna District, Rostam County, Fars province, Iran. At the 2006 census, its population was 51, in 8 families.
