= Sar-e Sal =

Sar-e Sal سرسل
- Village
- Location within Iran
- Coordinates: 30°21′09″N 51°28′42″E
- Country: Iran
- Province: Fars
- County: Rostam
- Bakhsh: Central
- Rural District: Rostam-e Yek

Population (2006)
  - Total: 34
- Time zone: UTC+3:30 (IRST)
  - Summer (DST): UTC+4:30 (IRDT)

Sar-e Sal (Persian: سرسل; also known as Sar-e Sīl-e Zavāl) is a village in Rostam-e Yek Rural District, in the Central District of Rostam County, Fars province, Iran. At the 2006 census, its population was 34, in 4 families.
