= Sirati =

Sirati سيرتي
- Village
- Location within Iran
- Coordinates: 30°29′25″N 51°20′13″E
- Country: Iran
- Province: Fars
- County: Rostam
- Bakhsh: Sorna
- Rural District: Poshtkuh-e Rostam

Population (2006)
  - Total: 56
- Time zone: UTC+3:30 (IRST)
  - Summer (DST): UTC+4:30 (IRDT)

Sirati (Persian: سيرتي, also Romanized as Sīratī; also known as Sīratī-ye Soflá) is a village in Poshtkuh-e Rostam Rural District, Sorna District, Rostam County, Fars province, Iran. At the 2006 census, its population was 56, in 9 families.
