= Tang-e Si =

Tang-e Si تنگ سي
- Village
- Location within Iran
- Coordinates: 30°23′15″N 51°19′19″E
- Country: Iran
- Province: Fars
- County: Rostam
- Bakhsh: Central
- Rural District: Rostam-e Do

Population (2006)
  - Total: 56
- Time zone: UTC+3:30 (IRST)
  - Summer (DST): UTC+4:30 (IRDT)

Tang-e Si (Persian: تنگ سي, also Romanized as Tang-e Sī; also known as Qal‘eh-ye Āqājān) is a village in Rostam-e Do Rural District, in the Central District of Rostam County, Fars province, Iran. At the 2006 census, its population was 56, in 12 families.
