= Pasheh Dan, Rostam =

Village in Fars, Iran

Pasheh Dan پشه دان
- Village
- Location within Iran
- Coordinates: 30°27′10″N 51°25′41″E
- Country: Iran
- Province: Fars
- County: Rostam
- Bakhsh: Sorna
- Rural District: Poshtkuh-e Rostam

Population (2006)
  - Total: 20
- Time zone: UTC+3:30 (IRST)
  - Summer (DST): UTC+4:30 (IRDT)

Pasheh Dan (Persian: پشه دان, also Romanized as Pasheh Dān; also known as Pīsheh Dān) is a village in Poshtkuh-e Rostam Rural District, Sorna District, Rostam County, Fars province, Iran. At the 2006 census, its population was 20, in 5 families.
