= Lirui-ye Sofla =

Lirui-ye Sofla ليروي سفلي
- Village
- Location within Iran
- Coordinates: 30°20′58″N 51°28′12″E
- Country: Iran
- Province: Fars
- County: Rostam
- Bakhsh: Central
- Rural District: Rostam-e Yek

Population (2006)
  - Total: 36
- Time zone: UTC+3:30 (IRST)
  - Summer (DST): UTC+4:30 (IRDT)

Lirui-ye Sofla (Persian: ليروي سفلي, also Romanized as Līrūī-ye Soflá; also known as Līrū and Līrū Zavāl) is a village in Rostam-e Yek Rural District, in the Central District of Rostam County, Fars province, Iran. At the 2006 census, its population was 36, in 6 families.
