= Bid Gerd =

Bid Gerd بيدگرد
- Village
- Location within Iran
- Coordinates: 30°15′02″N 51°28′17″E
- Country: Iran
- Province: Fars
- County: Rostam
- Bakhsh: Central
- Rural District: Rostam-e Yek

Population (2006)
  - Total: 113
- Time zone: UTC+3:30 (IRST)
  - Summer (DST): UTC+4:30 (IRDT)

Bid Gerd (Persian: بيدگرد, also Romanized as Bīd Gerd) is a village in Rostam-e Yek Rural District, in the Central District of Rostam County, Fars province, Iran. At the 2006 census, its population was 113, in 24 families.
