= Qalamdan-e Vosta =

Qalamdan-e Vosta قلمدان وسطي
- Village
- Location within Iran
- Coordinates: 30°22′28″N 51°28′57″E
- Country: Iran
- Province: Fars
- County: Rostam
- Bakhsh: Central
- Rural District: Rostam-e Yek

Population (2006)
  - Total: 185
- Time zone: UTC+3:30 (IRST)
  - Summer (DST): UTC+4:30 (IRDT)

Qalamdan-e Vosta (Persian: قلمدان وسطي, also Romanized as Qalamdān-e Vosţá; also known as Qalamdān and Qalamdān-e Bālā) is a village in Rostam-e Yek Rural District, in the Central District of Rostam County, Fars province, Iran. At the 2006 census, its population was 185, in 39 families.
