= Bard Kuh =

Bard Kuh بردكوه
- Village
- Location within Iran
- Coordinates: 30°15′13″N 51°34′18″E
- Country: Iran
- Province: Fars
- County: Rostam
- Bakhsh: Central
- Rural District: Rostam-e Yek

Population (2006)
  - Total: 30
- Time zone: UTC+3:30 (IRST)
  - Summer (DST): UTC+4:30 (IRDT)

Bard Kuh (Persian: بردكوه, also Romanized as Bard Kūh) is a village in Rostam-e Yek Rural District, in the Central District of Rostam County, Fars province, Iran. At the 2006 census, its population was 30, in 10 families.
