= Tol-e Bondu =

Tol-e Bondu تل بندو
- Village
- Location within Iran
- Coordinates: 30°19′16″N 51°20′55″E
- Country: Iran
- Province: Fars
- County: Rostam
- Bakhsh: Central
- Rural District: Rostam-e Do

Population (2006)
  - Total: 1,069
- Time zone: UTC+3:30 (IRST)
  - Summer (DST): UTC+4:30 (IRDT)

Tol-e Bondu (Persian: تل بندو, also Romanized as Tol-e Bondū and Tal-e Bondū) is a village in Rostam-e Do Rural District, in the Central District of Rostam County, Fars province, Iran. At the 2006 census, its population was 1,069, in 177 families.
