= Durag, Iran =

Durag (Persian: دورگ) in Iran may refer to:

- Durag-e Atabak, Fars Province
- Durag-e Cheshmeh Konari, Fars Province
- Durag-e Madineh, Fars Province
