= Kapar Khani =

Kapar Khani كپرخاني
- Village
- Location within Iran
- Coordinates: 30°35′39″N 51°10′58″E
- Country: Iran
- Province: Fars
- County: Rostam
- Bakhsh: Sorna
- Rural District: Poshtkuh-e Rostam

Population (2006)
  - Total: 16
- Time zone: UTC+3:30 (IRST)
  - Summer (DST): UTC+4:30 (IRDT)

Kapar Khani (Persian: كپرخاني, also Romanized as Kapar Khānī) is a village in Poshtkuh-e Rostam Rural District, Sorna District, Rostam County, Fars province, Iran. At the 2006 census, its population was 16, in 6 families.
