= Amir Ayyub =

Amir Ayyub اميرايوب
- Village
- Location within Iran
- Coordinates: 30°34′11″N 51°12′22″E
- Country: Iran
- Province: Fars
- County: Rostam
- Bakhsh: Sorna
- Rural District: Poshtkuh-e Rostam

Population (2006)
  - Total: 246
- Time zone: UTC+3:30 (IRST)
  - Summer (DST): UTC+4:30 (IRDT)

Amir Ayyub (Persian: اميرايوب, also Romanized as Amīr Ayyūb and Amīr 'Ayūb) is a village in Poshtkuh-e Rostam Rural District, Sorna District, Rostam County, Fars province, Iran. At the 2006 census, its population was 246, in 58 families.
