= Kupon-e Sofla =

Neighborhood in Fars province, Iran

Kupon-e Sofla Persian: كوپن سفلي
- Neighborhood
- Location within Iran
- Coordinates: 30°19′58″N 51°16′13″E
- Country: Iran
- Province: Fars
- County: Rostam
- District: Sorna
- City: Kupon

Population (2011)
  - Total: 239
- Time zone: UTC+3:30 (IRST)

Kupon-e Sofla (Persian: كوپن سفلي) (Note: Also romanized as Kūpon-e Soflá; also known as Kūpān, Kūpān, Kūpen Soflá, Kūpen Vostá, Kūpon-e Pā’īn, and Kupūn) is a neighborhood in the city of Kupon in Sorna District of Rostam County, Fars province, Iran.

== Demographics ==
=== Population ===
At the time of the 2006 National Census, Kupon-e Sofla's population was 227 in 48 households, when it was a village in Rostam-e Seh Rural District of the former Rostam District of Mamasani County. The following census in 2011 counted 239 people in 57 households, by which time the district had been separated from the county in the establishment of Rostam County. The rural district was transferred to the new Sorna District.

After the census, the villages of Kupon-e Olya, Kupon-e Sofla, and Kupon-e Vosta were merged to form the city of Kupon.
