= Donbildan =

Donbildan دنبيلدان
- Village
- Location within Iran
- Coordinates: 30°30′33″N 51°18′48″E
- Country: Iran
- Province: Fars
- County: Rostam
- Bakhsh: Sorna
- Rural District: Poshtkuh-e Rostam

Population (2006)
  - Total: 69
- Time zone: UTC+3:30 (IRST)
  - Summer (DST): UTC+4:30 (IRDT)

Donbildan (Persian: دنبيلدان, also Romanized as Donbīldān) is a village in Poshtkuh-e Rostam Rural District, Sorna District, Rostam County, Fars province, Iran. At the 2006 census, its population was 69, in 14 families.
