= Seyyed Sharif Shahada =

Seyyed Sharif Shahada سيدشريف شهدا
- Village
- Country: Iran
- Province: Fars
- County: Rostam
- Bakhsh: Sorna
- Rural District: Poshtkuh-e Rostam

Population (2006)
  - Total: 27
- Time zone: UTC+3:30 (IRST)
  - Summer (DST): UTC+4:30 (IRDT)

Seyyed Sharif Shahada (Persian: سيدشريف شهدا, also Romanized as Seyyed Sharīf Shahadā) is a village in Poshtkuh-e Rostam Rural District, Sorna District, Rostam County, Fars province, Iran. At the 2006 census, its population was 27, in 7 families.
