= Kel Konar =

Kel Konar كل كنار
- Village
- Location within Iran
- Coordinates: 30°25′33″N 51°25′02″E
- Country: Iran
- Province: Fars
- County: Rostam
- Bakhsh: Sorna
- Rural District: Poshtkuh-e Rostam

Population (2006)
  - Total: 57
- Time zone: UTC+3:30 (IRST)
  - Summer (DST): UTC+4:30 (IRDT)

Kel Konar (Persian: كل كنار, also Romanized as Kel Konār; also known as Kel Konārī) is a village in Poshtkuh-e Rostam Rural District, Sorna District, Rostam County, Fars province, Iran. At the 2006 census, its population was 57, in 10 families.
