= Eshkaftestan =

Eshkaftestan اشكفتستان
- Village
- Location within Iran
- Coordinates: 30°21′29″N 51°30′17″E
- Country: Iran
- Province: Fars
- County: Rostam
- Bakhsh: Central
- Rural District: Rostam-e Yek

Population (2006)
  - Total: 107
- Time zone: UTC+3:30 (IRST)
  - Summer (DST): UTC+4:30 (IRDT)

Eshkaftestan (Persian: اشكفتستان, also Romanized as Eshkaftestān and Eshkoftestān; also known as Eshkaft) is a village in Rostam-e Yek Rural District, in the Central District of Rostam County, Fars province, Iran. At the 2006 census, its population was 107, in 20 families.
