= Bakhsh Zirdu =

Bakhsh Zirdu بخش زيردو
- Village
- Location within Iran
- Coordinates: 30°15′22″N 51°25′06″E
- Country: Iran
- Province: Fars
- County: Rostam
- Bakhsh: Central
- Rural District: Rostam-e Yek

Population (2006)
  - Total: 192
- Time zone: UTC+3:30 (IRST)
  - Summer (DST): UTC+4:30 (IRDT)

Bakhsh Zirdu (Persian: بخش زيردو, also Romanized as Bakhsh Zīrdū; also known as Bakhs, Bakhs Zīrdu, Dehbaj, Deh Baj-e Bakhs, Zīrdow, Zīrdow Bakhs, and Zīrdu) is a village in Rostam-e Yek Rural District, in the Central District of Rostam County, Fars province, Iran. At the 2006 census, its population was 192, in 43 families.
