= Khakak Arab =

Khakak Arab خاكك عرب
- Village
- Location within Iran
- Coordinates: 30°20′03″N 51°19′23″E
- Country: Iran
- Province: Fars
- County: Rostam
- Bakhsh: Sorna
- Rural District: Rostam-e Seh

Population (2006)
  - Total: 1,474
- Time zone: UTC+3:30 (IRST)
  - Summer (DST): UTC+4:30 (IRDT)

Khakak Arab (Persian: خاكك عرب, also Romanized as Khākak 'Arab; also known as'Arab Khākak and Khākak-e 'Arabhā) is a village in Rostam-e Seh Rural District, Sorna District, Rostam County, Fars province, Iran. At the 2006 census, its population was 1,474, in 232 families.
