= Tal-e Afghani =

Tal-e Afghani تل افغاني
- Village
- Location within Iran
- Coordinates: 30°15′30″N 51°27′54″E
- Country: Iran
- Province: Fars
- County: Rostam
- Bakhsh: Central
- Rural District: Rostam-e Yek

Population (2006)
  - Total: 517
- Time zone: UTC+3:30 (IRST)
  - Summer (DST): UTC+4:30 (IRDT)

Tal-e Afghani (Persian: تل افغاني, also Romanized as Tal-e Afghānī, Tal-e Afghānī, and Tol Afghānī) is a village in Rostam-e Yek Rural District, in the Central District of Rostam County, Fars province, Iran. At the 2006 census, its population was 517, in 99 families.
