= Kulbakul-e Kuchak =

Kulbakul-e Kuchak كول باكول كوچك
- Village
- Location within Iran
- Coordinates: 30°16′30″N 51°26′15″E
- Country: Iran
- Province: Fars
- County: Rostam
- Bakhsh: Central
- Rural District: Rostam-e Do

Population (2006)
  - Total: 139
- Time zone: UTC+3:30 (IRST)
  - Summer (DST): UTC+4:30 (IRDT)

Kulbakul-e Kuchak (Persian: كول باكول كوچك, also Romanized as Kūlbākūl-e Kūchak; also known as Kūlbākūl and Kūl Bākūn) is a village in Rostam-e Do Rural District, in the Central District of Rostam County, Fars province, Iran. At the 2006 census, its population was 139, in 26 families.
