= Chahar Qash-e Talkhab =

Chahar Qash-e Talkhab چهارقاش تلخ اب
- Village
- Country: Iran
- Province: Fars
- County: Rostam
- Bakhsh: Sorna
- Rural District: Rostam-e Seh

Population (2006)
  - Total: 13
- Time zone: UTC+3:30 (IRST)
  - Summer (DST): UTC+4:30 (IRDT)

Chahar Qash-e Talkhab (Persian: چهارقاش تلخ اب, also Romanized as Chahār Qāsh-e Talkhāb) is a village in Rostam-e Seh Rural District, Sorna District, Rostam County, Fars province, Iran. At the 2006 census, its population was 13, in 4 families.
