= Seh Talan, Rostam =

Seh Talan سه تلان
- Village
- Location within Iran
- Coordinates: 30°14′55″N 51°27′48″E
- Country: Iran
- Province: Fars
- County: Rostam
- Bakhsh: Central
- Rural District: Rostam-e Yek

Population (2006)
  - Total: 62
- Time zone: UTC+3:30 (IRST)
  - Summer (DST): UTC+4:30 (IRDT)

Seh Talan (Persian: سه تلان, also Romanized as Seh Talān; also known as Dezak and Satalān) is a village in Rostam-e Yek Rural District, in the Central District of Rostam County, Fars province, Iran. At the 2006 census, its population was 62, in 11 families.
