= Durag-e Madineh =

Durag-e Madineh دورگ مدينه
- Village
- Location within Iran
- Coordinates: 30°20′33″N 51°25′19″E
- Country: Iran
- Province: Fars
- County: Rostam
- Bakhsh: Central
- Rural District: Rostam-e Do

Population (2006)
  - Total: 20
- Time zone: UTC+3:30 (IRST)
  - Summer (DST): UTC+4:30 (IRDT)

Durag-e Madineh (Persian: دورگ مدينه, also Romanized as Dūrag-e Madīneh; also known as Dūrakmadīneh and Dowrak) is a village in Rostam-e Do Rural District, in the Central District of Rostam County, Fars province, Iran. At the 2006 census, its population was 20, in 4 families.
