= Bakar-e Olya =

Bakar-e Olya بكرعليا
- Village
- Location within Iran
- Coordinates: 30°26′15″N 51°21′40″E
- Country: Iran
- Province: Fars
- County: Rostam
- Bakhsh: Sorna
- Rural District: Poshtkuh-e Rostam

Population (2006)
  - Total: 167
- Time zone: UTC+3:30 (IRST)
  - Summer (DST): UTC+4:30 (IRDT)

Bakar-e Olya (Persian: بكرعليا, also Romanized as Bakar-e 'Olyā and Bekar-e 'Olyā; also known as Bakar-e Bālā) is a village in Poshtkuh-e Rostam Rural District, Sorna District, Rostam County, Fars province, Iran. At the 2006 census, its population was 167, in 35 families.
