= Kulbakul =

Kulbakul (Persian: كول باكول), also known as Kulbakun, may refer to:

- Kulbakul-e Bozorg
- Kulbakul-e Kuchak
