= Moraskhun-e Sofla =

Moraskhun-e Sofla مراسخون سفلی
- Village
- Location within Iran
- Coordinates: 30°21′22″N 51°15′52″E
- Country: Iran
- Province: Fars
- County: Rostam
- Bakhsh: Sorna
- Rural District: Rostam-e Seh

Government
  - Meaning: میراث خون (Blood Heritage)

Population (2016)
  - Total: 562
- Time zone: UTC+3:30 (IRST)
  - Summer (DST): UTC+4:30 (IRDT)
- Area code: 3
- Website: http://www.ansarimoraskhoon.blogfa.com

Moraskhun-e Sofla (Persian: مراسخون سفلی, also Romanized as Morāskhūn-e Soflá) is a village in Rostam-e Seh Rural District, Sorna District, Rostam County, Fars province, Iran. At the 2016 census, its population was 562, in 151 families.
