= Durag-e Atabak =

Durag-e Atabak دورگ اتابك
- Village
- Location within Iran
- Coordinates: 30°21′07″N 51°24′07″E
- Country: Iran
- Province: Fars
- County: Rostam
- Bakhsh: Central
- Rural District: Rostam-e Do

Population (2006)
  - Total: 78
- Time zone: UTC+3:30 (IRST)
  - Summer (DST): UTC+4:30 (IRDT)

Durag-e Atabak (Persian: دورگ اتابك, also Romanized as Dūrag-e Ātābak; also known as Dūrakātābak and Dowrak) is a village in Rostam-e Do Rural District, in the Central District of Rostam County, Fars province, Iran. At the 2006 census, its population was 78, in 15 families.
