= Khanimeh =

Khanimeh (Persian: خنيمه) may refer to:

- Khanimeh-ye Bala
- Khanimeh-ye Pain
