= Shehneh, Fars =

Shehneh شهنه
- Village
- Location within Iran
- Coordinates: 30°19′29″N 51°31′28″E
- Country: Iran
- Province: Fars
- County: Rostam
- Bakhsh: Central
- Rural District: Rostam-e Yek

Population (2006)
  - Total: 196
- Time zone: UTC+3:30 (IRST)
  - Summer (DST): UTC+4:30 (IRDT)

Shehneh (Persian: شهنه; also known as Shehna) is a village in Rostam-e Yek Rural District, in the Central District of Rostam County, Fars province, Iran. At the 2006 census, its population was 196, in 46 families.
