= Deh Now-e Sadat-e Bala =

Deh Now-e Sadat-e Bala دهنوسادات بالا
- Village
- Location within Iran
- Coordinates: 30°18′23″N 51°22′57″E
- Country: Iran
- Province: Fars
- County: Rostam
- Bakhsh: Central
- Rural District: Rostam-e Do

Population (2006)
  - Total: 367
- Time zone: UTC+3:30 (IRST)
  - Summer (DST): UTC+4:30 (IRDT)

Deh Now-e Sadat-e Bala (Persian: دهنوسادات بالا, also Romanized as Deh Now-e Sādāt-e Bālā; also known as Dehnow-e Sādāt-e 'Olyā) is a village in Rostam-e Do Rural District, in the Central District of Rostam County, Fars province, Iran. At the 2006 census, its population was 367, in 85 families.
