= Dozdak-e Sofla =

Dozdak-e Sofla دزدک سفلی
- Village
- Location within Iran
- Coordinates: 30°18′31″N 51°23′29″E
- Country: Iran
- Province: Fars
- County: Rostam
- Bakhsh: Central
- Rural District: Rostam-e Do

Population (2006)
  - Total: 93
- Time zone: UTC+3:30 (IRST)
  - Summer (DST): UTC+4:30 (IRDT)

Dozdak-e Sofla (Persian: دزدک سفلی, also Romanized as Dozdak-e Soflá; also known as Dozdak-e Pā’īn) is a village in Rostam-e Do Rural District, in the Central District of Rostam County, Fars province, Iran. At the 2006 census, its population was 93, in 20 families.
