= Dozdak-e Olya =

Dozdak-e Olya دزدک علیا
- Village
- Location within Iran
- Coordinates: 30°18′14″N 51°23′46″E
- Country: Iran
- Province: Fars
- County: Rostam
- Bakhsh: Central
- Rural District: Rostam-e Do

Population (2006)
  - Total: 246
- Time zone: UTC+3:30 (IRST)
  - Summer (DST): UTC+4:30 (IRDT)

Dozdak-e Olya (Persian: دزدک علیا, also Romanized as Dozdak-e 'Olyā; also known as Dozdak-e Bālā) is a village in Rostam-e Do Rural District, in the Central District of Rostam County, Fars province, Iran. At the 2006 census, its population was 246, in 54 families.
