= Baba Meydan-e Zirrah =

Village in Fars province, Iran

Baba Meydan-e Zirrah Persian: بابا ميدان زيرراه
- Village
- Location within Iran
- Coordinates: 30°16′13″N 51°29′21″E
- Country: Iran
- Province: Fars
- County: Rostam
- District: Central
- Rural District: Rostam-e Yek

Population (2016)
  - Total: 1,250
- Time zone: UTC+3:30 (IRST)

Baba Meydan-e Zirrah (Persian: باباميدان زيرراه) (Note: Also romanized as Bābā Meydān-e Zīrrāh; also known as Bābāmeydān) is a village in Rostam-e Yek Rural District of the Central District of Rostam County, Fars province, Iran.

== Demographics ==
=== Population ===
At the time of the 2006 National Census, the village's population was 1,160 in 247 households, when it was in the former Rostam District of Mamasani County. The following census in 2011 counted 755 people in 192 households, by which time the district had been separated from the county in the establishment of Rostam County. The rural district was transferred to the new Central District. The 2016 census measured the population of the village as 1,250 people in 346 households. It was the most populous village in its rural district.
