= Moraskhun-e Olya =

Moraskhun-e Olya مراسخون عليا
- Village
- Location within Iran
- Coordinates: 30°22′10″N 51°16′43″E
- Country: Iran
- Province: Fars
- County: Rostam
- Bakhsh: Sorna
- Rural District: Rostam-e Seh

Population (2016)
  - Total: 562
- Time zone: UTC+3:30 (IRST)
  - Summer (DST): UTC+4:30 (IRDT)
- Area code: 3
- Website: http://www.ansarimoraskhoon.blogfa.com

Moraskhun-e Olya (Persian: مراسخون عليا, also Romanized as Morāskhūn-e 'Olyā; also known as Morāskhūn-e Bālā, Morāz Khān, Morāzkhān-e 'Olyā, and Murāz Khān) is a village in Rostam-e Seh Rural District, Sorna District, Rostam County, Fars province, Iran. At the 2016 census, its population was 562, in 160 families.
