= Dozdak-e Kuchek =

Dozdak-e Kuchek دزدک کوچک
- Village
- Location within Iran
- Coordinates: 30°17′46″N 51°24′17″E
- Country: Iran
- Province: Fars
- County: Rostam
- Bakhsh: Central
- Rural District: Rostam-e Do

Population (2006)
  - Total: 53
- Time zone: UTC+3:30 (IRST)
  - Summer (DST): UTC+4:30 (IRDT)

Dozdak-e Kuchek (Persian: دزدک کوچک, also Romanized as Dozdak-e Kūchek) is a village in Rostam-e Do Rural District, in the Central District of Rostam County, Fars province, Iran. At the 2006 census, its population was 53, in 9 families.
