= Zir Anay-e Sofla =

Zir Anay-e Sofla زيرعناي سفلي
- Village
- Location within Iran
- Coordinates: 30°25′08″N 51°26′40″E
- Country: Iran
- Province: Fars
- County: Rostam
- Bakhsh: Sorna
- Rural District: Poshtkuh-e Rostam

Population (2006)
  - Total: 57
- Time zone: UTC+3:30 (IRST)
  - Summer (DST): UTC+4:30 (IRDT)

Zir Anay-e Sofla (Persian: زيرعناي سفلي, also Romanized as Zīr 'Anāy-e Soflá; also known as Zīr 'Anā'-e Ābī) is a village in Poshtkuh-e Rostam Rural District, Sorna District, Rostam County, Fars province, Iran. At the 2006 census, its population was 57, distributed in 10 families.
