= Moraskhun =

Moraskhun (Persian: مراسخون), also rendered as Moraz Khan or Muraz Khan, may refer to:

- Moraskhun-e Olya
- Moraskhun-e Sofla
