= Deh Now-e Sadat =

Deh Now-e Sadat (Persian: دهنوسادات) may refer to:

- Deh Now-e Sadat-e Bala
- Deh Now-e Sadat-e Pain
- Dehnow-ye Sadat-e Vosta
