= Deh Now-e Sadat-e Pain =

Village in Fars province, Iran

Deh Now-e Sadat-e Pain Persian: دهنو سادات پائين
- Village
- Location within Iran
- Coordinates: 30°18′23″N 51°23′00″E
- Country: Iran
- Province: Fars
- County: Rostam
- District: Central
- Rural District: Rostam-e Do

Population (2016)
  - Total: 1,066
- Time zone: UTC+3:30 (IRST)

Deh Now-e Sadat-e Pain (Persian: دهنوسادات پائين) (Note: Also romanized as Deh Now-e Sādāt-e Pā’īn; also known as Dehnow-e Sādāt-e Soflá) is a village in Rostam-e Do Rural District of the Central District of Rostam County, Fars province, Iran.

== Demographics ==
=== Population ===
At the time of the 2006 National Census, the village's population was 579 in 123 households, when it was in the former Rostam District of Mamasani County. The following census in 2011 counted 673 people in 197 households, by which time the district had been separated from the county in the establishment of Rostam County. The rural district was transferred to the new Central District. The 2016 census measured the population of the village as 1,066 people in 319 households. It was the most populous village in its rural district.
