= Khanimeh-ye Bala =

Khanimeh-ye Bala خنيمه بالا
- Village
- Location within Iran
- Coordinates: 30°21′38″N 51°19′18″E
- Country: Iran
- Province: Fars
- County: Rostam
- Bakhsh: Sorna
- Rural District: Rostam-e Seh

Population (2006)
  - Total: 209
- Time zone: UTC+3:30 (IRST)
  - Summer (DST): UTC+4:30 (IRDT)

Khanimeh-ye Bala (Persian: خنيمه بالا, also Romanized as Khanīmeh-ye Bālā; also known as Khanīmeh-ye 'Olyā) is a village in Rostam-e Seh Rural District, Sorna District, Rostam County, Fars province, Iran. At the 2006 census, its population was 209, in 31 families.
