= Tall Kohneh, Fars =

Tall Kohneh تل كهنه
- Village
- Location within Iran
- Coordinates: 30°14′24″N 51°25′41″E
- Country: Iran
- Province: Fars
- County: Rostam
- Bakhsh: Central
- Rural District: Rostam-e Yek

Population (2006)
  - Total: 181
- Time zone: UTC+3:30 (IRST)
  - Summer (DST): UTC+4:30 (IRDT)

Tall Kohneh (Persian: تل كهنه, also Romanized as Tal-e Kohneh and Tol-e Khoneh) is a village in Rostam-e Yek Rural District, in the Central District of Rostam County, Fars province, Iran. At the 2006 census, its population was 181, in 37 families.
