= Kulbakul-e Bozorg =

Kulbakul-e Bozorg كول باكول بزرگ
- Village
- Location within Iran
- Coordinates: 30°17′09″N 51°26′07″E
- Country: Iran
- Province: Fars
- County: Rostam
- Bakhsh: Central
- Rural District: Rostam-e Yek

Population (2006)
  - Total: 68
- Time zone: UTC+3:30 (IRST)
  - Summer (DST): UTC+4:30 (IRDT)

Kulbakul-e Bozorg (Persian: كول باكول بزرگ, also Romanized as Kūlbākūl-e Bozorg; also known as Kūlbākūn, Kūlbākūn-e Pā‘īn, and Kūlbākūn Pā‘īn) is a village in Rostam-e Yek Rural District, in the Central District of Rostam County, Fars province, Iran. At the 2006 census, its population was 68, in 12 families.
