= Sar Taveh-ye Midjan =

Sar Taveh-ye Midjan سرطاوه ميدجان
- Village
- Location within Iran
- Coordinates: 30°35′06″N 51°18′51″E
- Country: Iran
- Province: Fars
- County: Rostam
- Bakhsh: Sorna
- Rural District: Poshtkuh-e Rostam

Population (2006)
  - Total: 112
- Time zone: UTC+3:30 (IRST)
  - Summer (DST): UTC+4:30 (IRDT)

Sar Taveh-ye Midjan (Persian: سرطاوه ميدجان, also Romanized as Sar Ţāveh-ye Mīdjān; also known as Sar Tāveh and Sar Ţāveh) is a village in Poshtkuh-e Rostam Rural District, Sorna District, Rostam County, Fars province, Iran. At the 2006 census, its population was 112, in 25 families.
