= Khanimeh-ye Pain =

Khanimeh-ye Pain خنيمه پائين
- Village
- Location within Iran
- Coordinates: 30°20′18″N 51°18′48″E
- Country: Iran
- Province: Fars
- County: Rostam
- Bakhsh: Sorna
- Rural District: Rostam-e Seh

Population (2006)
  - Total: 205
- Time zone: UTC+3:30 (IRST)
  - Summer (DST): UTC+4:30 (IRDT)

Khanimeh-ye Pain (Persian: خنيمه پائين, also Romanized as Khanīmeh-ye Pā’īn; also known as Khanīmeh-ye Soflá) is a village in Rostam-e Seh Rural District, Sorna District, Rostam County, Fars province, Iran. At the 2006 census, its population was 205, in 33 families.
