= Sartaveh =

Sartaveh or Sar Taveh (Persian: سرتاوه) may refer to:

- Sar Taveh, Rostam, Fars Province
- Sartaveh, Kohgiluyeh and Boyer-Ahmad
