= Baba Meydan-e Zir-e Rah =

Baba Meydan-e Olya باباميدان عليا
- Village
- Location within Iran
- Coordinates: 30°19′10″N 51°31′52″E
- Country: Iran
- Province: Fars
- County: Rostam
- Bakhsh: Central
- Rural District: Rostam-e Yek

Population (2006)
  - Total: 614
- Time zone: UTC+3:30 (IRST)
  - Summer (DST): UTC+4:30 (IRDT)

Baba Meydan-e Olya (Persian: باباميدان عليا, also Romanized as Bābā Meydān-e 'Olyā; also known as Bābā Meydān, Bābā Meydān-e Bālā, Bāmairūn, Bā Meydān, and Bāmeyrūn) is a village in Rostam-e Yek Rural District, in the Central District of Rostam County, Fars province, Iran. At the 2006 census, its population was 614, in 121 families.
