= Zir Anay-e Olya =

Zir Anay-e Olya زيرعناي عليا
- Village
- Location within Iran
- Coordinates: 30°24′39″N 51°27′14″E
- Country: Iran
- Province: Fars
- County: Rostam
- Bakhsh: Central
- Rural District: Rostam-e Yek

Population (2006)
  - Total: 53
- Time zone: UTC+3:30 (IRST)
  - Summer (DST): UTC+4:30 (IRDT)

Zir Anay-e Olya (Persian: زيرعناي عليا, also Romanized as Zīr 'Anāy-e 'Olyā; also known as Zīr 'Anā'-e Baj) is a village in Rostam-e Yek Rural District, in the Central District of Rostam County, Fars province, Iran. At the 2006 census, its population was 53, in 11 families.
