= Durag-e Cheshmeh Konari =

Durag-e Cheshmeh Konari دورگ چشمه كناري
- Village
- Location within Iran
- Coordinates: 30°19′01″N 51°27′22″E
- Country: Iran
- Province: Fars
- County: Rostam
- Bakhsh: Central
- Rural District: Rostam-e Yek

Population (2006)
  - Total: 23
- Time zone: UTC+3:30 (IRST)
  - Summer (DST): UTC+4:30 (IRDT)

Durag-e Cheshmeh Konari (Persian: دورگ چشمه كناري, also Romanized as Dūrag-e Cheshmeh Konārī; also known as Dorag-e Cheshmeh Konārī) is a village in Rostam-e Yek Rural District, in the Central District of Rostam County, Fars province, Iran. At the 2006 census, its population was 23, in 6 families.
