= Kupen =

Kupen may refer to:

- Kupen, Gabrovo Province, Bulgaria
- Kupen, Iran (disambiguation)
