= Bakar, Iran =

Bakar or Bekar (Persian: بكر) may refer to:

- Bakar-e Olya
- Bakar-e Sofla
