= Kupon, Iran =

City in Fars province, Iran

Kupon Persian: کوپن
- City
- Location within Iran
- Coordinates: 30°20′09″N 51°17′28″E
- Country: Iran
- Province: Fars
- County: Rostam
- District: Sorna

Population (2016)
  - Total: 3,237
- Time zone: UTC+3:30 (IRST)

Kupon (Persian: کوپن) is a city in, and the capital of, Sorna District of Rostam County, Fars province, Iran. It also serves as the administrative center for Rostam-e Seh Rural District. The city is the merger of the villages of Kupon-e Olya, Kupon-e Sofla, and Kupon-e Vosta.

== Demographics ==
=== Population ===
At the time of the 2006 National Census, the population (as the total of its three constituent villages before the merger) was 3,152 in 605 households, when it was in Rostam-e Seh Rural District of the former Rostam District of Mamasani County. The following census in 2011 counted 3,225 people in 821 households, by which time the district had been separated from the county in the establishment of Rostam County. The rural district was transferred to the new Sorna District. The 2016 census measured the population as 3,237 people in 909 households, when the villages had merged to form the city of Kupon.
