= Bakar =

Bakar or Bakkar may refer to:

- Bakar, Croatia, town in Croatia
- Bakar (musician), British singer
- Bakar, Iran (disambiguation), villages in Iran
- Bakkar, Egyptian cartoon series
- Bakkar ibn Abd al-Malik, 8th-century Umayyad prince

== See also ==
- Bacar (disambiguation)
