= Shahneh =

Shahneh or Shehneh (Persian: شهنه or شحنه) may refer to:

- Shehneh, Fars (شهنه - Shehneh), Iran
- Shahneh, Yazd (شحنه - Shaḩneh), Iran
