= Balangan-e Olya =

Balangan-e Olya بالنگان عليا
- Village
- Location within Iran
- Coordinates: 30°21′18″N 51°23′01″E
- Country: Iran
- Province: Fars
- County: Rostam
- Bakhsh: Central
- Rural District: Rostam-e Do

Population (2006)
  - Total: 70
- Time zone: UTC+3:30 (IRST)
  - Summer (DST): UTC+4:30 (IRDT)

Balangan-e Olya (Persian: بالنگان عليا, also Romanized as Bālangān-e 'Olyā; also known as Bālangū, Bālangū-ye Bālā, and Bālangū-ye 'Olyā) is a village in Rostam-e Do Rural District, in the Central District of Rostam County, Fars province, Iran. At the 2006 census, its population was 70, in 13 families.
