= Tall Kohneh =

Tall Kohneh or Toll Kohneh or Tal-e Kohneh or Tol-e Kohneh (Persian: تل كهنه) may refer to:

- Tall Kohneh, Fars
- Tall Kohneh, Khuzestan
