= Samak =

Samak may refer to:

- SAMAK, Nordic trade union
- Samak, Utah, a census-designated place (CDP) in the United States
- Samak, Fars, a village in Fars Province, Iran
- Samak, South Khorasan, a village in South Khorasan Province, Iran
- Samak Sundaravej (1935-2009), Thai politician
- Rosanan Samak, Bruneian football coach and player

== See also ==
- Samak-e Ayyar, or Samak the Ayyar, an ancient Persian story
