= Balangan =

Balangan may refer to:

- Balangan Beach, a surfing beach in Bali
- Balangan Regency in South Kalimantan
- Balangan-e Olya, a village in Rostam-e Do Rural District, Iran
