= Sarvandan =

Sarvandan or Sorvandan (Persian: سروندان) may refer to:

- Sarvandan, Fars
- Sarvandan, Gilan
