= Balangu =

Balangu may refer to:

== Places ==
- Balangan-e Olya, a village in Rostam-e Do Rural District, Iran

== Other uses ==
- Balangu, a meat dish of Nigeria
- Balangu, vernacular name for a few plants of the mint family and their seeds:
  - Lallemantia iberica, known in Iran as balangu shahri
  - Lallemantia royleana, known in Iran as balangu shirazi
