= Coupon (disambiguation) =

Coupon may refer to the following:

- Coupon, a document exchanged in a retail context to provide a discount on goods or services
- Coupon (finance), with respect to bonds or certain derivatives, a coupon rate is the interest rate that the issuer pays to the bond holders
- Coupon (PWB), a printed circuit card used to test the quality of a printed wiring board (PWB) fabrication process.
- Coupon, Pennsylvania (place), a small, unincorporated community in Pennsylvania
- Football pools promoters in the United Kingdom use this name when referring to the paper grids which gamblers fill in to bet on the results of football fixtures
- Ukrainian karbovanets, the former Ukrainian currency
- Coupon busters, these women's multi-style shoes fashionable in post-World War II England featured as a plot point in Foyle's War Series Seven, episode 2 ("The Cage")
- Pipe coupon, the saddle shaped circular cut out waste piece that must be recovered when tapping into a pipe wall.
- Coupon testing, the testing of a small sample of a material as a proxy for a larger system
