= Bacar =

Bacar may refer to:

- Bacar, Mozambique, a village
- Bacar Baldé (born 1992), Bissau-Guinean footballer
- Mohamed Bacar (born 1962), former President of Anjouan, Comoros

== See also ==
- Bakar (disambiguation)
