= Chahar Qash, Izeh =

Chahar Qash چهارقاش
- Village
- Location within Iran
- Coordinates: 32°00′13″N 49°52′40″E
- Country: Iran
- Province: Khuzestan
- County: Izeh
- Bakhsh: Susan
- Rural District: Susan-e Gharbi

Population (2006)
  - Total: 25
- Time zone: UTC+3:30 (IRST)
  - Summer (DST): UTC+4:30 (IRDT)

Chahar Qash (Persian: چهارقاش, also Romanized as Chahār Qāsh; also known as Chahār Qāsh-e Kūrkūr) is a village in Susan-e Gharbi Rural District, Susan District, Izeh County, Khuzestan Province, Iran. At the 2006 census, its population was 25, in 4 families.
