= Masiri =

City in Fars province, Iran

Masiri Persian: مصیری
- City
- Location within Iran
- Coordinates: 30°14′37″N 51°31′36″E
- Country: Iran
- Province: Fars
- County: Rostam
- District: Central

Population (2016)
  - Total: 9,031
- Time zone: UTC+3:30 (IRST)

Masiri (Persian: مصیری, romanized as Maşīrī and Masīrī) is a city in the Central District of Rostam County, Fars province, Iran, serving as capital of both the county and the district. It is also the administrative center for Rostam-e Yek Rural District.

== Demographics ==
=== Population ===
At the time of the 2006 National Census, the city's population was 5,365 in 1,178 households, when it was capital of the former Rostam District of Mamasani County. The following census in 2011 counted 5,830 people in 1,488 households, by which time the district had been separated from the county in the establishment of Rostam County. The city and the rural district were transferred to the new Central District, with Masiri as the county's capital. The 2016 census measured the population of the city as 9,031 people in 2,592 households.
