= Coupon (PWB) =

Printed circuit board

A coupon or test coupon is a printed circuit board (PCB) used to test the quality of a printed wiring board (PWB) fabrication process. Test coupons are fabricated on the same panel as the PWBs, typically at the edges. Coupons are then inspected to ensure proper layer alignment, electrical connectivity, and cross sectioned to inspect internal structures. Coupons can be designed custom for a PWB or selected from a vendor library.

== Overview ==
A coupon is designed to include traces and vias with the same dimensions and structures as those of the main PWB. It is standard practice to locate coupons on the edges of a panel, from which multiple PWBs are fabricated, to verify the consistency of plating, etching, and lamination across the whole panel. The use of coupons for testing is a necessary step in accurately and reliably monitoring fabrication quality and consistency.
