= Dezg-e Pain =

Dezg-e Pain دزگپايين
- Village
- Location within Iran
- Coordinates: 32°47′51″N 59°12′38″E
- Country: Iran
- Province: South Khorasan
- County: Birjand
- Bakhsh: Central
- Rural District: Baqeran

Population (2006)
  - Total: 24
- Time zone: UTC+3:30 (IRST)
  - Summer (DST): UTC+4:30 (IRDT)

Dezg-e Pain (Persian: دزگپايين, also Romanized as Dezg-e Pā’īn and Dezag-e Pā’īn) is a village in Baqeran Rural District, in the Central District of Birjand County, South Khorasan Province, Iran. At the 2006 census, its population was 24, in 10 families.
