= Chahar Qash, Andika =

Chahar Qash چهارقاش
- Village
- Location within Iran
- Coordinates: 32°02′30″N 49°35′05″E
- Country: Iran
- Province: Khuzestan
- County: Andika
- Bakhsh: Abezhdan
- Rural District: Kushk

Population (2006)
  - Total: 270
- Time zone: UTC+3:30 (IRST)
  - Summer (DST): UTC+4:30 (IRDT)

Chahar Qash (Persian: چهارقاش, also Romanized as Chahār Qāsh) is a village in Kushk Rural District, Abezhdan District, Andika County, Khuzestan Province, Iran. At the 2006 census, its population was 270, in 48 families.
