= Sartaveh-ye Kabitollah =

Sartaveh-ye Kabitollah سرتاوه كابيت اله
- Village
- Location within Iran
- Coordinates: 30°50′53″N 50°48′05″E
- Country: Iran
- Province: Kohgiluyeh and Boyer-Ahmad
- County: Charam
- Bakhsh: Sarfaryab
- Rural District: Poshteh-ye Zilayi

Population (2006)
  - Total: 19
- Time zone: UTC+3:30 (IRST)
  - Summer (DST): UTC+4:30 (IRDT)

Sartaveh-ye Kabitollah (Persian: سرتاوه كابيت اله, also Romanized as Sartāveh-ye Kābītollah; also known as Sartāveh) is a village in Poshteh-ye Zilayi Rural District, Sarfaryab District, Charam County, Kohgiluyeh and Boyer-Ahmad Province, Iran. At the 2006 census, its population was 19, in 5 families.
