= Zirna =

Zirna زيرنا
- Village
- Location within Iran
- Coordinates: 31°18′34″N 50°47′21″E
- Country: Iran
- Province: Kohgiluyeh and Boyer-Ahmad
- County: Boyer-Ahmad
- Bakhsh: Margown
- Rural District: Zilayi

Population (2006)
  - Total: 435
- Time zone: UTC+3:30 (IRST)
  - Summer (DST): UTC+4:30 (IRDT)

Zirna (Persian: زيرنا, also Romanized as Zīrnā; also known as Zīrānā and Zīr Annā) is a village in Zilayi Rural District, Margown District, Boyer-Ahmad County, Kohgiluyeh and Boyer-Ahmad Province, Iran. At the 2006 census, its population was 435, in 80 families.
