= Dozak, Hormozgan =

Dozak دزک
- Village
- Location within Iran
- Coordinates: 27°23′35″N 56°16′18″E
- Country: Iran
- Province: Hormozgan
- County: Bandar Abbas
- Bakhsh: Central
- Rural District: Isin

Population (2006)
  - Total: 128
- Time zone: UTC+3:30 (IRST)
  - Summer (DST): UTC+4:30 (IRDT)

Dozak (Persian: دزک; also known as Dezekeh and Dozag) is a village in Isin Rural District, in the Central District of Bandar Abbas County, Hormozgan Province, Iran. At the 2006 census, its population was 128, in 37 families.
