= Chahar Qash, Fars =

Chahar Qash چهارقاش
- Village
- Location within Iran
- Coordinates: 28°39′26″N 52°45′25″E
- Country: Iran
- Province: Fars
- County: Firuzabad
- Bakhsh: Central
- Rural District: Jaydasht

Population (2006)
  - Total: 91
- Time zone: UTC+3:30 (IRST)
  - Summer (DST): UTC+4:30 (IRDT)

Chahar Qash (Persian: چهارقاش, also Romanized as Chahār Qāsh; also known as Chahār Khāsh) is a village in Jaydasht Rural District, in the Central District of Firuzabad County, Fars province, Iran. At the 2006 census, its population was 91, in 22 families.
