= Dezak-e Sofla =

Village in Chaharmahal and Bakhtiari, Iran

Dezak-e Sofla دزک سفلی
- Village
- Location within Iran
- Coordinates: 32°09′46″N 50°20′56″E
- Country: Iran
- Province: Chaharmahal and Bakhtiari
- County: Kuhrang
- Bakhsh: Bazoft
- Rural District: Doab

Population (2006)
  - Total: 251
- Time zone: UTC+3:30 (IRST)
  - Summer (DST): UTC+4:30 (IRDT)

Dezak-e Sofla (Persian: دزک سفلی, also Romanized as Dezak-e Soflá; also known as Dezdak Pā’īn, Dozdak-e Pā’īn, and Dozdak-e Soflá) is a village in Doab Rural District, Bazoft District, Kuhrang County, Chaharmahal and Bakhtiari Province, Iran. At the 2006 census, its population was 251, in 41 families. The village is populated by Lurs.
