= Dezdak, Kohgiluyeh =

Dezdak دزدک
- Village
- Location within Iran
- Coordinates: 30°50′08″N 50°30′16″E
- Country: Iran
- Province: Kohgiluyeh and Boyer-Ahmad
- County: Kohgiluyeh
- Bakhsh: Central
- Rural District: Rak

Population (2006)
  - Total: 279
- Time zone: UTC+3:30 (IRST)
  - Summer (DST): UTC+4:30 (IRDT)

Dezdak (Persian: دزدک; also known as Dezak, Dozak, Dozdāgh, Dūzak, and Duzdāgh) is a village in Rak Rural District, in the Central District of Kohgiluyeh County, Kohgiluyeh and Boyer-Ahmad Province, Iran. At the 2006 census, its population was 279, in 63 families.
