= Dezak-e Sarcheshmeh =

Dezak-e Sarcheshmeh دزک سرچشمه
- Village
- Location within Iran
- Coordinates: 32°09′31″N 50°19′09″E
- Country: Iran
- Province: Chaharmahal and Bakhtiari
- County: Kuhrang
- Bakhsh: Bazoft
- Rural District: Doab

Population (2006)
  - Total: 75
- Time zone: UTC+3:30 (IRST)
  - Summer (DST): UTC+4:30 (IRDT)

Dezak-e Sarcheshmeh (Persian: دزک سرچشمه, also Romanized as Dezzak-e Sarcheshmeh) is a village in Doab Rural District, Bazoft District, Kuhrang County, Chaharmahal and Bakhtiari Province, Iran. At the 2006 census, its population was 75, in 12 families. The village is populated by Lurs.
