= Rostam District =

Former district in Fars province, Iran

Rostam District Persian: بخش رستم
- Former District
- Location within Iran
- Coordinates: 30°27′N 51°20′E
- Country: Iran
- Province: Fars
- County: Mamasani
- Capital: Masiri

Population (2006)
  - Total: 45,377
- Time zone: UTC+3:30 (IRST)

Rostam District (Persian: بخش رستم) is a former administrative division of Mamasani County, Fars province, Iran. Its capital was the city of Masiri.

== History ==
After the 2006 National Census, the district was separated from the county in the establishment of Rostam County.

== Demographics ==
=== Population ===
At the time of the 2006 census, the district's population was 45,377 in 9,134 households.

=== Administrative divisions ===
Rostam District Population
Administrative Divisions	2006
Poshtkuh-e Rostam RD (Note: Formerly Poshtkuh-e Mamasani Rural District)	9,106
Rostam-e Do RD	6,864
Rostam-e Seh RD	9,525
Rostam-e Yek RD	14,517
Masiri (city)	5,365
Total	45,377
RD = Rural District
