= Rostam-e Seh Rural District =

Rural district in Fars province, Iran

Rostam-e Seh Rural District Persian: دهستان رستم سه
- Rural District
- Location within Iran
- Coordinates: 30°19′41″N 51°18′30″E
- Country: Iran
- Province: Fars
- County: Rostam
- District: Sorna
- Capital: Kupon

Population (2016)
  - Total: 6,234
- Time zone: UTC+3:30 (IRST)

Rostam-e Seh Rural District (Persian: دهستان رستم سه) is in Sorna District of Rostam County, Fars province, Iran. It is administered from the city of Kupon.

== Demographics ==
=== Population ===
At the time of the 2006 National Census, the rural district's population (as a part of the former Rostam District of Mamasani County) was 9,525 in 1,777 households. There were 9,497 inhabitants in 2,306 households at the following census of 2011, by which time the district had been separated from the county in the establishment of Rostam County. The rural district was transferred to the new Sorna District. The 2016 census measured the population of the rural district as 6,234 in 1,752 households. The most populous of its 21 villages was Hoseynabad-e Rostam, with 1,795 people.
