= Rostam-e Do Rural District =

Rural district in Fars province, Iran

Rostam-e Do Rural District Persian: دهستان رستم دو
- Rural District
- Location within Iran
- Coordinates: 30°19′50″N 51°23′42″E
- Country: Iran
- Province: Fars
- County: Rostam
- District: Central
- Capital: Dehnow-e Moqimi

Population (2016)
  - Total: 6,514
- Time zone: UTC+3:30 (IRST)

Rostam-e Do Rural District (Persian: دهستان رستم دو) is in the Central District of Rostam County, Fars province, Iran. Its capital is the village of Dehnow-e Moqimi.

== Demographics ==
=== Population ===
At the time of the 2006 National Census, the rural district's population (as a part of the former Rostam District of Mamasani County) was 6,864 in 1,338 households. There were 7,206 inhabitants in 1,876 households at the following census of 2011, by which time the district had been separated from the county in the establishment of Rostam County. The rural district was transferred to the new Central District. The 2016 census measured the population of the rural district as 6,514 in 1,888 households. The most populous of its 36 villages was Deh Now-e Sadat-e Pain, with 1,066 people.
