= Poshtkuh-e Rostam Rural District =

Rural district in Fars province, Iran

Poshtkuh-e Rostam Rural District Persian: دهستان پشتكوه رستم
- Rural District
- Location within Iran
- Coordinates: 30°30′N 51°18′E
- Country: Iran
- Province: Fars
- County: Rostam
- District: Sorna
- Capital: Chahar Taq

Population (2016)
  - Total: 7,811
- Time zone: UTC+3:30 (IRST)

Poshtkuh-e Rostam Rural District (Persian: دهستان پشتكوه رستم) (Note: Formerly Poshtkuh-e Mamasani Rural District (دهستان پشتكوه ممسنی)) is in Sorna District of Rostam County, Fars province, Iran. Its capital is the village of Chahar Taq.

== Demographics ==
=== Population ===
At the time of the 2006 National Census, the rural district's population (as a part of the former Rostam District of Mamasani County) was 9,106 in 1,761 households. There were 8,906 inhabitants in 2,203 households at the following census of 2011, by which time the district had been separated from the county in the establishment of Rostam County. The rural district was transferred to the new Sorna District. The 2016 census measured the population of the rural district as 7,811 in 2,157 households. The most populous of its 97 villages was Pehun, with 930 people.
