= Rostam-e Yek Rural District =

Rural district in Fars province, Iran

Rostam-e Yek Rural District Persian: دهستان رستم یک
- Rural District
- Location within Iran
- Coordinates: 30°19′34″N 51°28′50″E
- Country: Iran
- Province: Fars
- County: Rostam
- District: Central
- Capital: Masiri

Population (2016)
  - Total: 11,534
- Time zone: UTC+3:30 (IRST)

Rostam-e Yek Rural District (Persian: دهستان رستم یک) is in the Central District of Rostam County, Fars province, Iran. It is administered from the city of Masiri.

== Demographics ==
=== Population ===
At the time of the 2006 National Census, the rural district's population (as a part of the former Rostam District of Mamasani County) was 14,517 in 3,080 households. There were 15,065 inhabitants in 3,942 households at the following census of 2011, by which time the district had been separated from the county in the establishment of Rostam County. The rural district was transferred to the new Central District. The 2016 census measured the population of the rural district as 11,534 in 3,360 households. The most populous of its 73 villages was Baba Meydan-e Zirrah, with 1,250 people.
