= Sorna District =

District in Fars province, Iran

Sorna District Persian: بخش سورنا
- District
- Location within Iran
- Coordinates: 30°26′43″N 51°17′59″E
- Country: Iran
- Province: Fars
- County: Rostam
- Capital: Kupon

Population (2016)
  - Total: 17,282
- Time zone: UTC+3:30 (IRST)

Sorna District (Persian: بخش سورنا) is in Rostam County, Fars province, Iran. Its capital is the city of Kupon.

== History ==
After the 2006 National Census, Rostam District was separated from Mamasani County in the establishment of Rostam County, which was divided into two districts of two rural districts each, with Masiri as its capital and only city at the time. After the 2011 census, three villages merged to form the new city of Kupon.

== Demographics ==
=== Population ===
At the time of the 2011 census, the district's population was 18,403 people in 4,509 households. The 2016 census measured the population of the district as 17,282 inhabitants in 4,818 households.

=== Administrative divisions ===
Sorna District Population
Administrative Divisions	2011	2016
Poshtkuh-e Rostam RD (Note: Formerly Poshtkuh-e Mamasani Rural District)	8,906	7,811
Rostam-e Seh RD	9,497	6,234
Kupon (city) (Note: Merger of three villages)		3,237
Total	18,403	17,282
RD = Rural District
