= Central District (Rostam County) =

District in Fars province, Iran

Central District (Rostam County) Persian: بخش مرکزی شهرستان رستم
- District
- Location within Iran
- Coordinates: 30°20′N 51°30′E
- Country: Iran
- Province: Fars
- County: Rostam
- Capital: Masiri

Population (2016)
  - Total: 27,079
- Time zone: UTC+3:30 (IRST)

The Central District of Rostam County (Persian: بخش مرکزی شهرستان رستم) is in Fars province, Iran. Its capital is the city of Masiri.

== History ==
After the 2006 National Census, Rostam District was separated from Mamasani County in the establishment of Rostam County, which was divided into two districts of two rural districts each, with Masiri as its capital and only city at the time.

== Demographics ==
=== Population ===
At the time of the 2011 census, the district's population was 28,101 people in 7,306 households. The 2016 census measured the population of the district as 27,079 inhabitants in 7,840 households.

=== Administrative divisions ===
Central District (Rostam County) Population
Administrative Divisions	2011	2016
Rostam-e Do RD	7,206	6,514
Rostam-e Yek RD	15,065	11,534
Masiri (city)	5,830	9,031
Total	28,101	27,079
RD = Rural District
