= Rostam County =

County in Fars province, Iran

Rostam County Persian: شهرستان رستم
- County
- Location of Rostam County in Fars province (top left, green)

- Location of Fars province in Iran
- Coordinates: 30°27′N 51°20′E
- Country: Iran
- Province: Fars
- Capital: Masiri
- Districts: Central, Sorna

Population (2016)
  - Total: 44,386
- Time zone: UTC+3:30 (IRST)

Rostam County (Persian: شهرستان رستم) is in Fars province, Iran. Its capital is the city of Masiri.

== History ==
After the 2006 National Census, Rostam District was separated from Mamasani County in the establishment of Rostam County, which was divided into two districts of two rural districts each, with Masiri as its capital and only city at the time. After the 2011 census, three villages merged to form the new city of Kupon.

== Demographics ==
=== Population ===
At the time of the 2011 census, the county's population was 46,851 people in 11,902 households. The 2016 census measured the population of the county as 44,386 in 12,668 households.

=== Administrative divisions ===
Rostam County's population history and administrative structure over two consecutive censuses are shown in the following table.

Rostam County Population
Administrative Divisions	2011	2016
Central District	28,101	27,079
Rostam-e Do RD	7,206	6,514
Rostam-e Yek RD	15,065	11,534
Masiri (city)	5,830	9,031
Sorna District	18,403	17,282
Poshtkuh-e Rostam RD (Note: Formerly Poshtkuh-e Mamasani Rural District)	8,906	7,811
Rostam-e Seh RD	9,497	6,234
Kupon (city) (Note: Merger of three villages)		3,237
Total	46,851	44,386
RD = Rural District

== See also ==
Media related to Rostam County at Wikimedia Commons
