= Dudek (disambiguation) =

Dudek is a Slavic surname.

Dudek may also refer to:

- Dudek, Iran (disambiguation), several places in Iran
- DUDEK, a Polish encryption device
- Dudek Paragliding, a Polish aircraft manufacturer
- Dudek V-1 Sportplane
