= Dudek, Iran =

Dudek (Persian: دودك) in Iran, also rendered as Dodak, may refer to:

- Dudek-e Olya
- Dudek-e Sofla
- Dudek-e Vosta
