= Taylor J-2 =

American two-seat light aircraft

J-2 Cub
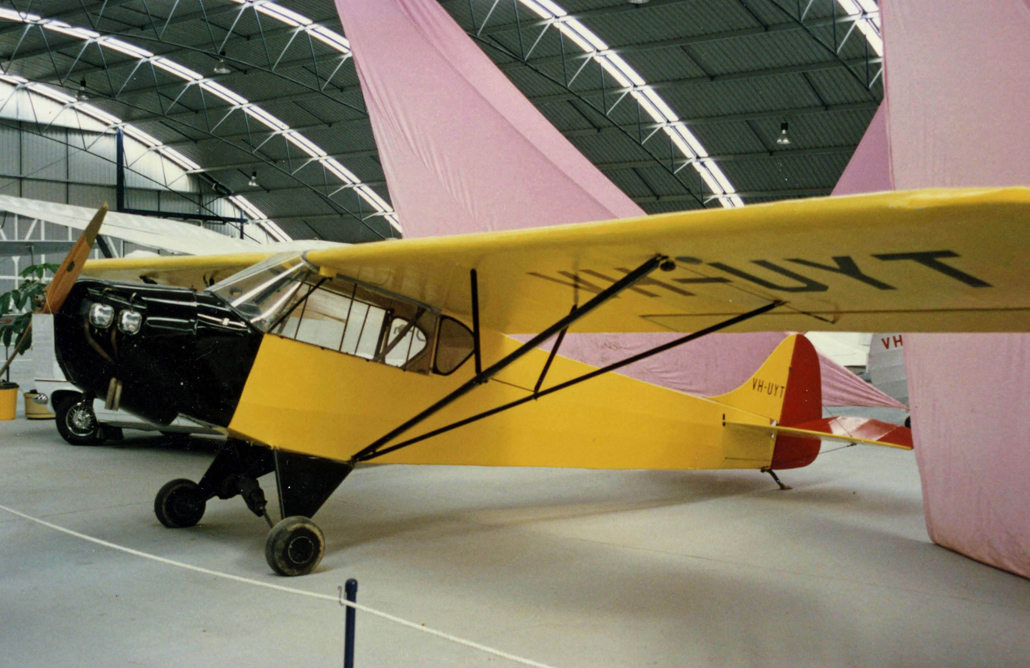
- Taylor J-2 Cub built in June 1937 in the Drage Airworld museum at Wangaratta Victoria in March 1988

General information
- Type: Light aircraft
- Manufacturer: Taylor Aircraft; Piper Aircraft
- Designer: Walter Jamouneau; Clarence Gilbert Taylor
- Number built: 1,207

History
- Manufactured: 1936-1938
- First flight: 1935
- Developed from: Taylor Cub
- Variants: Piper J-3

The Taylor J-2 Cub (later also known as the Piper J-2 Cub) is an American two-seat light aircraft that was designed and built by the Taylor Aircraft Company. The company became the Piper Aircraft Company and the J-2 was first of a long line of related Piper Cub designs.

== Development ==
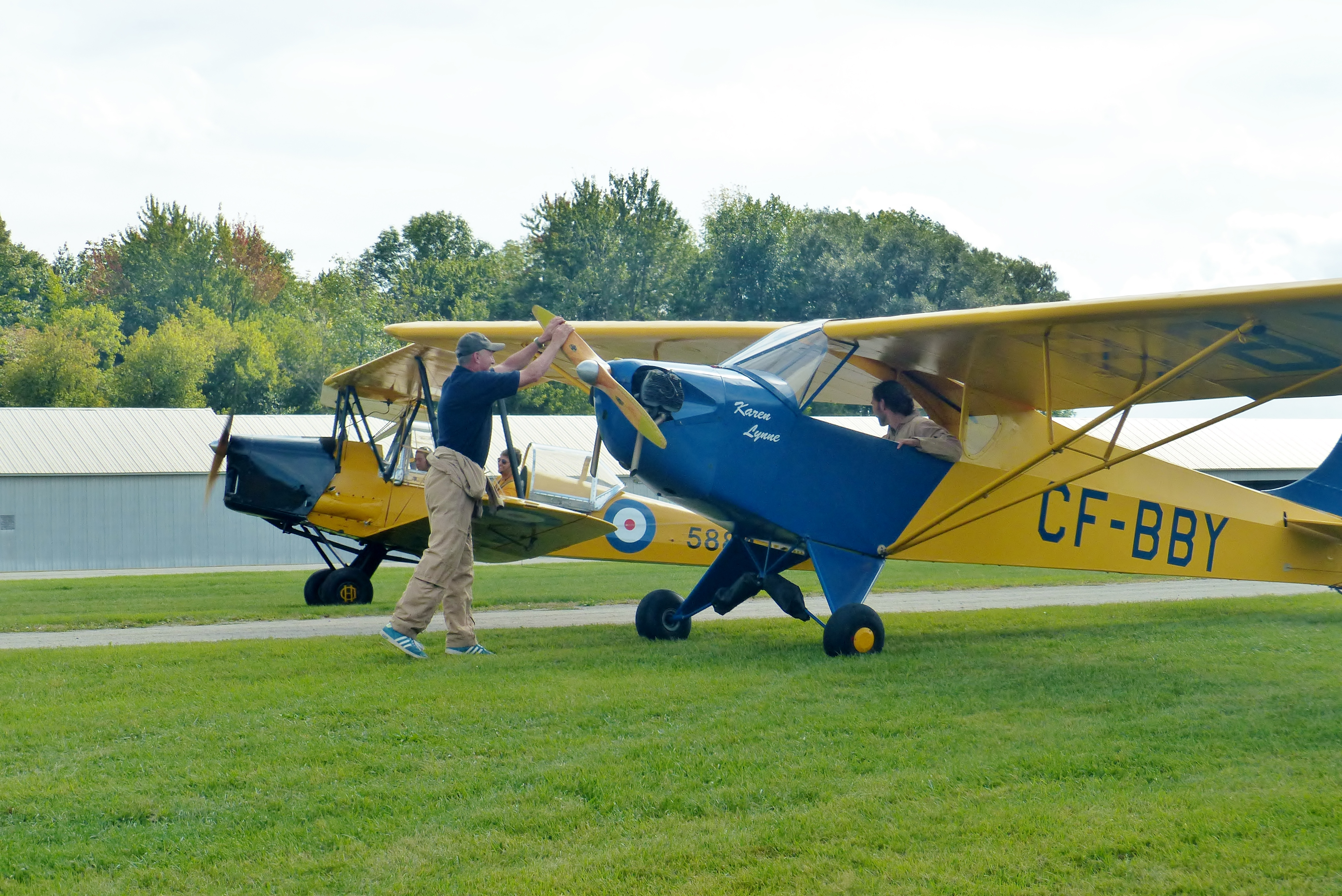
1936-built J-2 Cub at Guelph Airpark, Canada, in 2016

The J-2 Cub was a development of the earlier Taylor Cub. In 1935 the Taylor Aircraft Company had decided to improve their Cub line of aircraft which were angular and austere-looking and initially had an unglazed cabin area.

The new J-2 had rounded-off wing tips, a similarly "rounded" fin and rudder framed up and fabric-covered separately from the fuselage structure, enclosed cabin and wider Goodyear "airwheel" tires, a special low-pressure variety of aircraft landing gear tire pioneered by Alvin Musselmann U.S. patent 1,877,360 in 1929 that resembled a later tundra tire in general appearance and proportions. Powered by a 37 hp Continental A-40-3 piston engine the aircraft appeared in October 1935 and the type certificate was issued on 14 February 1936. From September 1936 the engine was changed to a 40 hp Continental A-40-4. One sub-type was produced, the J-2S which was a float-equipped version.

In 1935 Clarence Gilbert Taylor left the company to start another aircraft manufacturer which would become Taylorcraft. William T. Piper bought Taylor's shares in the company. In 1936 and 1937 some aircraft were completed by Aircraft Associates in California and these were known as the Western Cub.

In 1937 the original Piper factory, a renovated former silk mill in Bradford, PA, was destroyed by fire and the company moved to Lock Haven, PA and production restarted in May 1937 and the company was renamed the Piper Aircraft Corporation in November 1937.

== Production and operational use ==
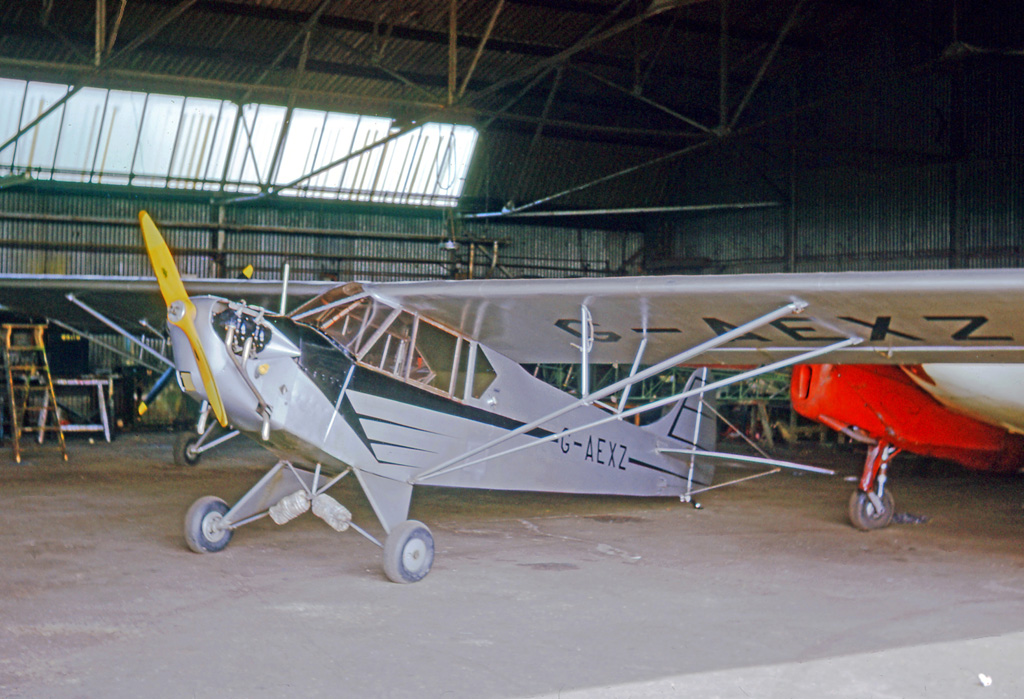
1938-built Piper J-2 Cub at Fair Oaks airfield, England, in 1965

The last of 1,207 J-2s was completed in 1938 as production of the J-3 Cub started. Numbers of J-2 Cubs were exported to Europe including to the United Kingdom. The type was mainly flown by private pilot owners.

Over 100 Taylor and Piper J-2s remained on the U.S. civil aircraft register in 2009.

== Variants ==
- Dudek V-1 Sportplane a low-wing homebuilt based on the J-2.

== Specifications (J-2 Cub) ==
Data from Specifications of American Airplanes

General characteristics

- Crew: 2
- Length: 22 ft 5 in (6.83 m)
- Wingspan: 35 ft 2 1/2 in (10.732 m)
- Height: 6 ft 8 in (2.03 m)
- Wing area: 178.5 sq ft (16.58 m^{2})
- Empty weight: 563 lb (255 kg)
- Gross weight: 970 lb (440 kg)
- Fuel capacity: 9 US gal (7.5 imp gal; 34 L)
- Powerplant: 1 × Continental A-40-3 air-cooled flat-four, 37 hp (28 kW)

Performance

- Maximum speed: 87 mph (140 km/h, 76 kn)
- Cruise speed: 70 mph (110 km/h, 61 kn)
- Range: 210 mi (340 km, 180 nmi)
- Service ceiling: 12,000 ft (3,700 m)
- Rate of climb: 450 ft/min (2.3 m/s)
