= Dudar (disambiguation) =

Dudar is a village in Hungary.

Dudar may also refer to:

- village in Iran: Dudar, Iran
- village in Spain: Dúdar
- Dudar Hahanov (1921–1995), Soviet Ossetian conductor and composer
- Dudar (surname)
