= Dudek =

Dudek (Czech and Slovak feminine: Dudková) is a Czech, Polish and Slovak surname, meaning 'hoopoe'. The bearer of the surname probably had a characteristic that made them resemble this bird, such as a long nose, hairstyle, smell, or timidity. Notable people with the surname include:

- Alyson Dudek (born 1990), American speed skater
- Anne Dudek (born 1975), American actress
- Carlota Dudek (born 2002), French breakdancer
- Dariusz Dudek (born 1975), Polish footballer
- Gerd Dudek (1938–2022), German jazz tenor
- Grażyna Dudek (born 1960), Polish figure skater
- Gregory Dudek, Canadian computer scientist
- Helmut Dudek (1957–1994), Polish-German footballer
- Jerzy Dudek (born 1973), Polish footballer
- Joe Dudek (born 1964), American football player
- Kyle Dudek (born 1985), American lawyer
- Les Dudek (born 1952), American guitarist
- Leland Dudek (born 1976 or 1977), American public servant
- Louis Dudek (1918–2001), Canadian poet
- Michal Dudek (born 1990), Czech speedway rider
- Mike Dudek (born 1995), American football wide receiver
- Patryk Dudek (born 1992), Polish speedway rider
- Paulina Dudek (born 1997), Polish footballer
- Sebastian Dudek (born 1980), Polish footballer
- Serena Dudek (born 1964), American neuroscientist

== See also ==
- Dudek Paragliders, a Polish paraglider manufacturer
- Dudar
- Duda
