= Dudek-e Olya =

Dudek-e Olya دودك عليا
- Village
- Location within Iran
- Coordinates: 30°27′37″N 51°21′26″E
- Country: Iran
- Province: Fars
- County: Rostam
- Bakhsh: Sorna
- Rural District: Poshtkuh-e Rostam

Population (2006)
  - Total: 25
- Time zone: UTC+3:30 (IRST)
  - Summer (DST): UTC+4:30 (IRDT)

Dudek-e Olya (Persian: دودك عليا, also Romanized as Dūdek-e 'Olyā; also known as Dūdek and Dūdek-e Bālā) is a village in Poshtkuh-e Rostam Rural District, Sorna District, Rostam County, Fars province, Iran. At the 2006 census, its population was 25, in 5 families.
