= Dudek-e Vosta =

City in Fars, Iran

Dudek-e Vosta دودك وسطي
- Village
- Location within Iran
- Coordinates: 30°28′52″N 51°21′02″E
- Country: Iran
- Province: Fars
- County: Rostam
- Bakhsh: Sorna
- Rural District: Poshtkuh-e Rostam

Population (2006)
  - Total: 259
- Time zone: UTC+3:30 (IRST)
  - Summer (DST): UTC+4:30 (IRDT)

Dudek-e Vosta (Persian: دودك وسطي, also Romanized as Dūdek-e Vosţá; also known as Dodak and Dūdek) is a village in Poshtkuh-e Rostam Rural District, Sorna District, Rostam County, Fars province, Iran. According to the 2006 census, its population was 259, in 51 families.
