= Walter Jamouneau =

Walter Corey Jamouneau (born 21 September 1912, New Jersey - d. 13 September 1988, Pennsylvania), was the aviation engineer who designed the Piper J-3 Cub light aircraft. By modifying the contours of the Taylor H-2 Cub, he created the shape and form of the unforgettable Piper Cub. Initially he was fired by Clarence Gilbert Taylor for his efforts, but was rehired by William T. Piper, who at this time had taken control of the financially failing Taylor Aircraft Company. He also improved the handling of the Cub by widening the tread of the landing gear and incorporating a tail wheel rather than the fixed skid of the H-2. He later became a member of the board at Piper Aircraft and spent his entire working life with the company.
