= Dudek V-1 Sportplane =

Dudek V-1 Sportsplane

General information
- Type: Homebuilt Aircraft
- National origin: United States of America
- Designer: Stan Dudek

History
- First flight: 11 March 1955
- Developed from: Piper J-2 Cub

The Dudek V-1 Sportplane is a low wing, conventional landing gear, homebuilt aircraft developed from the Piper J-2 Cub.

== Design and development ==
Dudek used a J-2 Cub purchased for $300 as a donor aircraft for the prototype. He used a scale balsa model to engineer the conversion from a high-wing enclosed aircraft to a low wing open cockpit sportsplane rather than design drawings or blueprints.

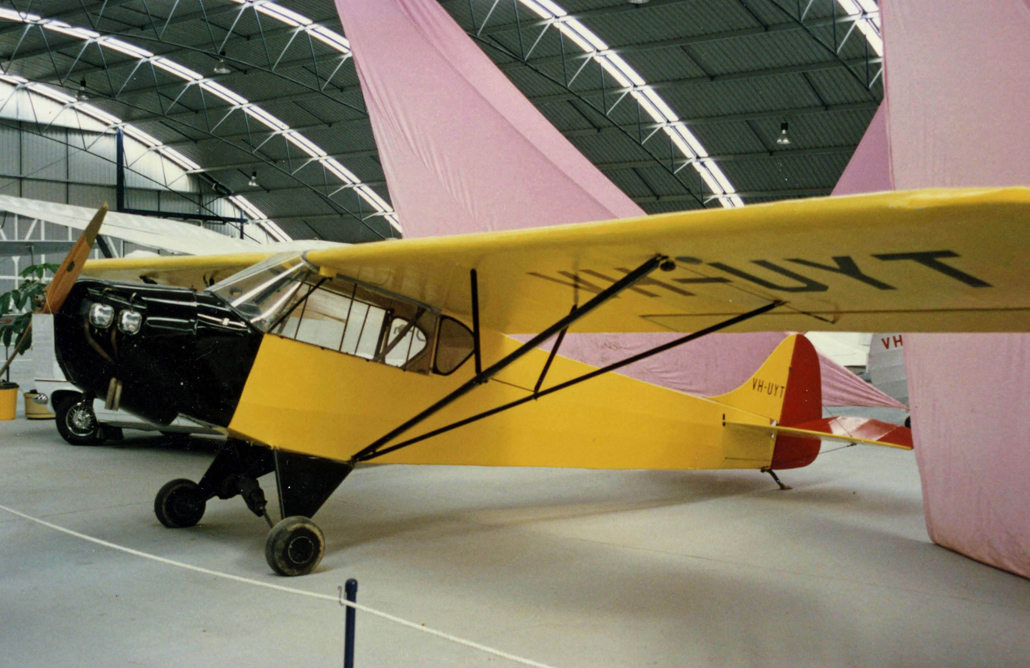
The high-winged J-2 Cub

The fuselage is welded tube steel with fabric covering and wooden stringers. Landing gear was sourced from a Piper J-5. Wing struts were sourced from a Waco CG-4A.

== Operational history ==
The first flight occurred on 11 March 1955. The prototype N35A was registered as late as 2006.

== Specifications (Dudek V-1 Sportsplane) ==
Data from Sport Aviation

General characteristics

- Crew: one
- Length: 17 ft 4 in (5.28 m)
- Wingspan: 20 ft 10 in (6.35 m)
- Height: 4 ft 10 in (1.47 m)
- Empty weight: 582 lb (264 kg)
- Gross weight: 885 lb (401 kg)
- Powerplant: 1 × Continental A65 , 65 hp (48 kW)

Performance

- Cruise speed: 83 kn (95 mph, 153 km/h)
- Stall speed: 35 kn (40 mph, 64 km/h)

== See also ==
Aircraft of comparable role, configuration, and era

- LIPNUR Belalang
