= Dudek-e Sofla =

Dudek-e Sofla دودك سفلي
- Village
- Location within Iran
- Coordinates: 30°27′55″N 51°21′09″E
- Country: Iran
- Province: Fars
- County: Rostam
- Bakhsh: Sorna
- Rural District: Poshtkuh-e Rostam

Population (2006)
  - Total: 114
- Time zone: UTC+3:30 (IRST)
  - Summer (DST): UTC+4:30 (IRDT)

Dudek-e Sofla (Persian: دودك سفلي, also Romanized as Dūdek-e Soflá; also known as Dūdek and Dūdek-e Pā’īn) is a village in Poshtkuh-e Rostam Rural District, Sorna District, Rostam County, Fars province, Iran. At the 2006 census, its population was 114, in 23 families.
