= DUDEK =

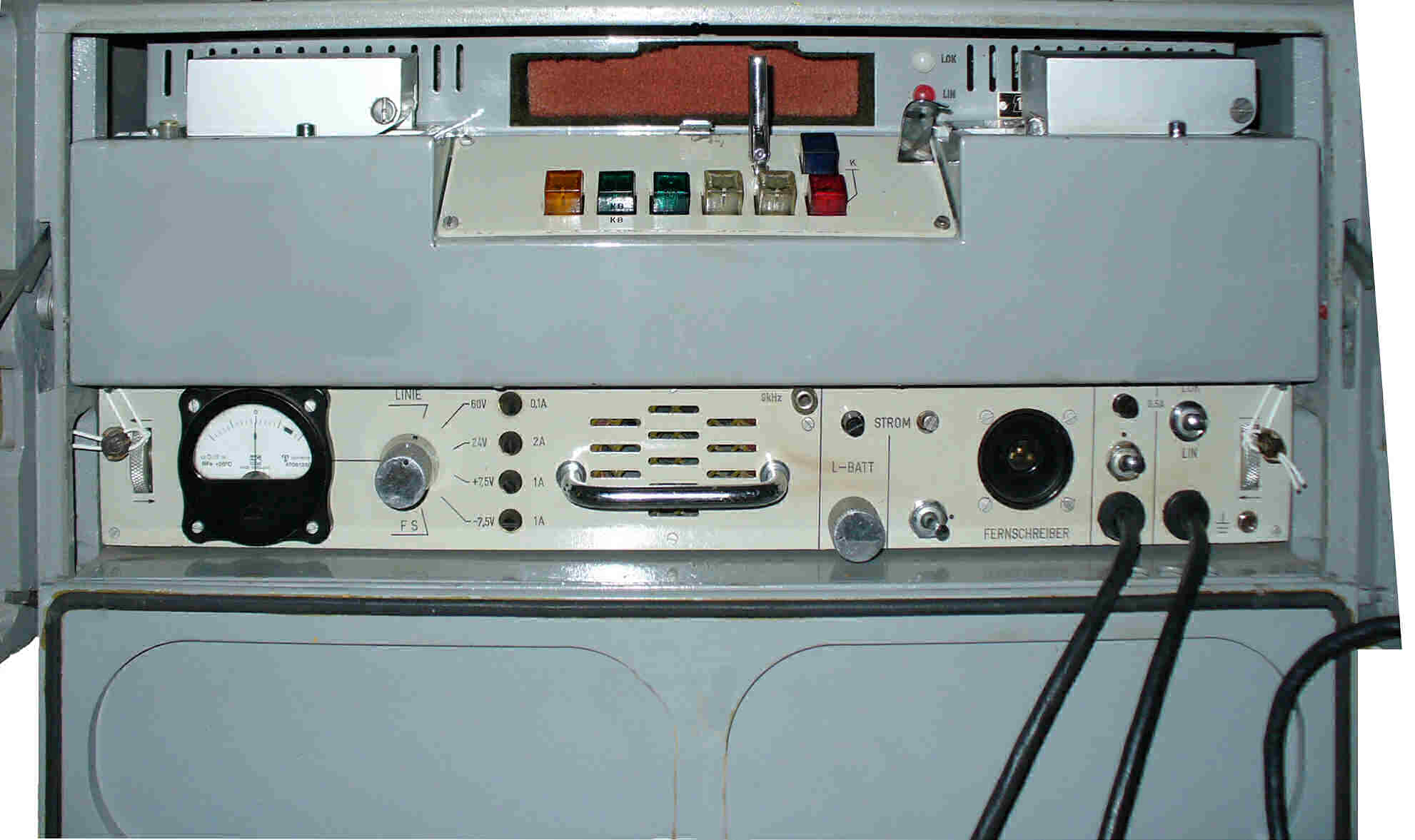
A T-353 DUDEK version supplied to the Stasi.

The TgS-1 DUDEK (Polish: hoopoe) (Dalekopisowe Urządzenie Do Elektronicznego Kodowania -- Teleprinter Device for Electronic Coding) was an on-line and off-line encryption system developed during the Cold War in the 1960s in the Polish People's Republic by the Telkom Teletra company and the Ministry of Interior for use on teleprinter circuits. The units saw use in the Polish Ministerstwo Spraw Wewnętrznych networks serving the (Milicja Obywatelska), the (Służba Bezpieczeństwa), the Polish Ministry of National Defense (Ministerstwo Obrony Narodowej), the Ministry of Foreign Affairs (Ministerstwo Spraw Zagranicznych) and the National Bank of Poland (Narodowy Bank Polski). The Poles also pressed Warsaw Pact states to adopt the DUDEK sets for international traffic.

The DUDEK series used random symmetric keys provided on paper tapes, which were XORed by the unit with the plaintext provided from the teleprinter or recorded on different paper tapes. The DUDEK sets were to be used in conjunction with teleprinters like the Siemens/Ceska Zbrojovka T-100 or the RFT T-51. The maximum transmission speed was at 50 or 75 Baud. The system was cleared up to the top secret level by the Poles provided that it served within the Tempested environment.

A newer and slightly improved model using the TTL technology instead of toroid cores logic was developed in the late 1970s and named the TgS-3 DUDEK.

The last DUDEK sets were retired by the Policja as of January 1, 2011.

== Versions ==
At least four basic versions are known to have existed:

- TgS-1 - basic version.
- TgS-1M - mobile version.
- TgS-1MS - mobile version.
- TgS-3 - a newer version introduced into the service in Poland in the early 1980s, which used the TTL technology instead of toroid cores logic.

Each version also had derivative models, which differed with regard to the type of punched paper readers and the associated ancillaries.

The T-352 and T-353 were the Stasi adopted names of the TgS-1 and TgS-1M DUDEK sets respectively.
