= Dudar (surname) =

Dudar is a Slavic occupational surname literally meaning a "duda (bagpipe) player". Notable people with the surname include:

- Aleś Dudar, Belarusian poet, critic, and translator
- Dmitry Dudar, Belarusian footballer
- Emiliano Dudar, Argentine footballer
- Margaret Dudar, birth name of Margaret Spellings, American government and non-profit executive
