= Dudek Paragliders =

Polish aircraft manufacturer

- Company type: Privately held company
- Industry: Aerospace
- Founded: August 22, 1995; 30 years ago
- Founder: Piotr Dudek, Wojtek Domanski, Darek Filipowicz
- Headquarters: Bydgoszcz, Poland
- Key people: Managing partners: Wojtek Domanski and Piotr Dudek
- Products: Paragliders, rescue parachutes and paragliding harnesses
- Number of employees: 140 as of 1 January 2018
- Website: www.dudek.eu

Dudek Paragliders (until 26 May 2006 called Dudek Paragliding) is a Polish aircraft manufacturer based near Bydgoszcz and founded by Piotr Dudek, Wojtek Domanski, and Darek Filipowicz on August 22, 1995. The company specializes in the design and manufacture of paragliders, rescue parachutes and paragliding harnesses.

In 2016 the two managing partners of the company were Wojtek Domanski and Piotr Dudek.

Domanski has been the leader of Polish Paramotor Team at the World and European Championships since 2005 and was the sport director of the World Paramotor Championships that were held at Łomża in 2008. He was also the Polish delegate to CIMA microlight committee and in 2010, was elected president of the paramotor subcommittee at CIMA. He is the founder of the European Paramotor League project, which later became the World League Cup.

Piotr Dudek has been paragliding since 1987 and is an instructor and competition pilot, flying in the 1995 World Championships held in Verbier, on a paraglider he designed and constructed.

The company was initially noted for its paramotor wings, but later branched into soaring and alpine descent wings.

The company has produced a wide range of paragliders, including the beginner Dudek Rex, the intermediate Vox, Max and Shark, the competition Lux and Action and the two-pace Twix.

The company's design of the Dudek Run&Fly alpine descent wing was noted by Cross Country magazine for its light weight of 968 grams in the 16 square metre size.

The Dudek V-King is a dual purpose single-skin wing designed for soaring and also for paramotoring use. A Cross Country review praised the company's design for its performance and flexibility.

== Aircraft ==
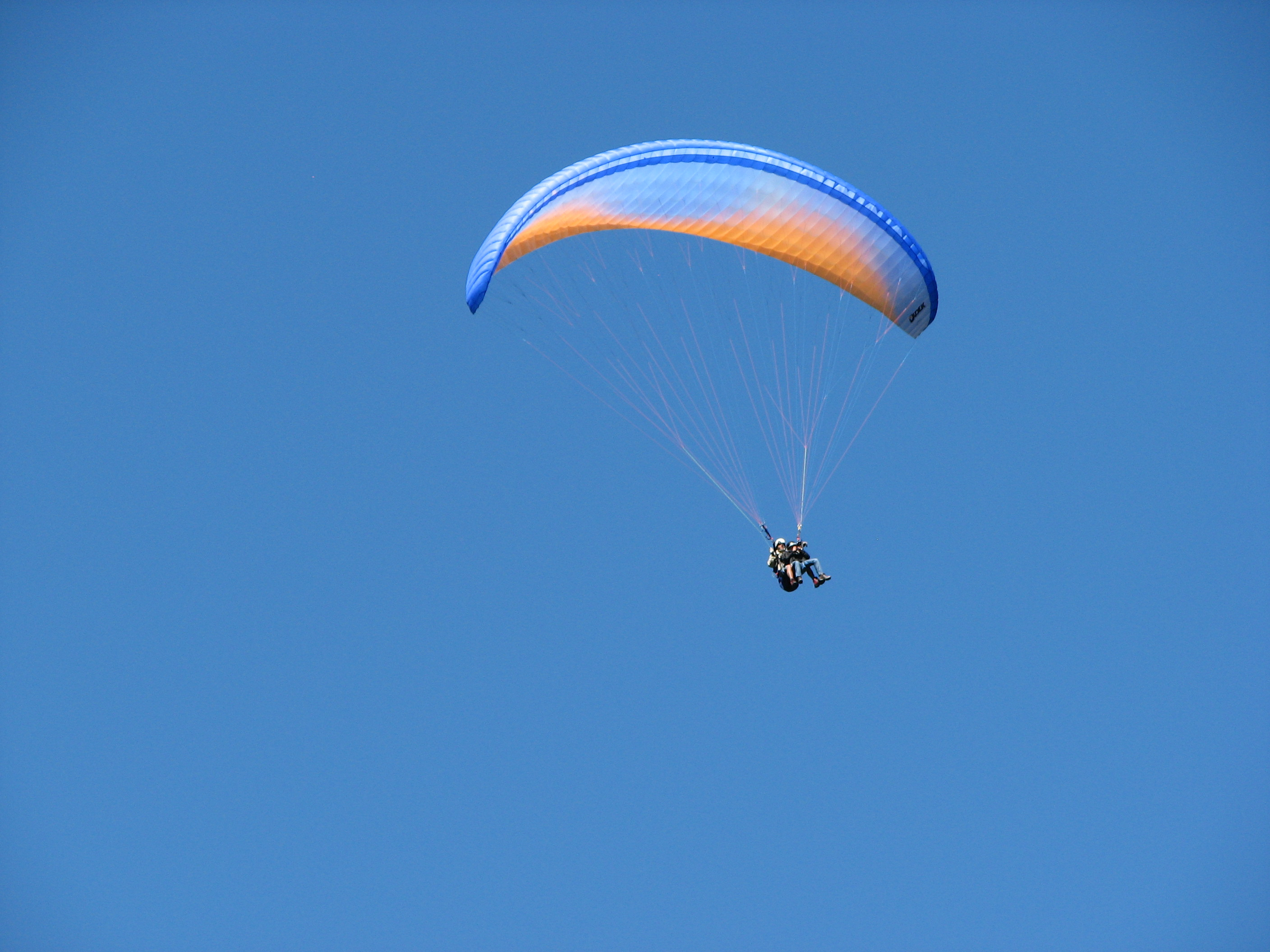
Dudek Orca in flight.

Summary of aircraft built by Dudek Paragliders:

- Dudek Action
- Dudek Air-Light
- Dudek Alt
- Dudek Atak
- Dudek Bi-Light
- Dudek Coden
- Dudek Coden Pro
- Dudek Colt 2
- Dudek Condor
- Dudek Elf
- Dudek Freeway
- Dudek Guliwer
- Dudek Hadron
- Dudek Jumbo
- Dudek Lux
- Dudek Mach 1.1
- Dudek Manta
- Dudek Marlin
- Dudek Max
- Dudek Nemo
- Dudek Nucleon
- Dudek Optic 2
- Dudek Orca 4
- Dudek Patrol
- Dudek Plasma
- Dudek Plus
- Dudek Reaction
- Dudek Reportair
- Dudek Rex
- Dudek Run&Fly
- Dudek Shark
- Dudek Snake
- Dudek Synthesis
- Dudek Top
- Dudek Traper
- Dudek Twix
- Dudek Universal
- Dudek Vip
- Dudek V-King
- Dudek Vox
- Dudek Wezyr
- Dudek Zagzig
- Dudek ZakoSpeed
