= Kahnuiyeh =

Kahnuiyeh or Kahnuyeh or Kahnowyeh (Persian: كهنويه) may refer to:

- Kahnuyeh, Khonj, Fars province, Iran
- Kahnuyeh, Lamerd, Fars province, Iran
- Kahnuyeh Rural District, an administrative division of Lamerd County, Fars province, Iran
- Kahnuiyeh, Isfahan
