= Bolboli =

Bolboli or Bal Bali (Persian: بلبلي) may refer to:

- Bal Bali, Fars
- Bolboli, Hormozgan
