= Abu Hana =

Abu Hana ابوحنا
- Village
- Location within Iran
- Coordinates: 27°40′58″N 53°02′18″E
- Country: Iran
- Province: Fars
- County: Lamerd
- Bakhsh: Alamarvdasht
- Rural District: Alamarvdashtt

Population (2006)
  - Total: 90
- Time zone: UTC+3:30 (IRST)
  - Summer (DST): UTC+4:30 (IRDT)

Abu Hana (Persian: ابوحنا, also Romanized as Abū Ḩanā; also known as Abū 'anā) is a village in Alamarvdasht Rural District, Alamarvdasht District, Lamerd County, Fars province, Iran. At the 2006 census, its population was 90, in 17 families.
