= Vardavan =

Vardavan وردوان
- Village
- Location within Iran
- Coordinates: 27°44′11″N 52°52′12″E
- Country: Iran
- Province: Fars
- County: Lamerd
- Bakhsh: Alamarvdasht
- Rural District: Alamarvdasht

Population (2006)
  - Total: 105
- Time zone: UTC+3:30 (IRST)
  - Summer (DST): UTC+4:30 (IRDT)

Vardavan (Persian: وردوان, also Romanized as Vardavān) is a village in Alamarvdasht Rural District, Alamarvdasht District, Lamerd County, Fars province, Iran. At the 2006 census, its population was 105, in 20 families.
