= Zalemi =

Zalemi ظالمي
- Village
- Location within Iran
- Coordinates: 27°45′13″N 52°47′44″E
- Country: Iran
- Province: Fars
- County: Lamerd
- Bakhsh: Alamarvdasht
- Rural District: Alamarvdasht

Population (2006)
  - Total: 46
- Time zone: UTC+3:30 (IRST)
  - Summer (DST): UTC+4:30 (IRDT)

Zalemi (Persian: ظالمي, also Romanized as Z̧ālemī) is a village in Alamarvdasht Rural District, Alamarvdasht District, Lamerd County, Fars province, Iran. At the 2006 census, its population was 46, in 10 families.
