= Anjirband =

Anjirband انجيربند
- Village
- Location within Iran
- Coordinates: 27°43′30″N 52°51′22″E
- Country: Iran
- Province: Fars
- County: Lamerd
- Bakhsh: Alamarvdasht
- Rural District: Alamarvdasht

Population (2006)
  - Total: 198
- Time zone: UTC+3:30 (IRST)
  - Summer (DST): UTC+4:30 (IRDT)

Anjirband (Persian: انجيربند, also Romanized as Anjīrband) is a village in Alamarvdasht Rural District, Alamarvdasht District, Lamerd County, Fars province, Iran. At the 2006 census, its population was 198, in 47 families.
