= Chahkowr =

Chahkowr Chahkur
- Village
- Location within Iran
- Coordinates: 27°34′31″N 53°05′25″E
- Country: Iran
- Province: Fars
- County: Lamerd
- District: Alamarvdasht
- Rural District: Alamarvdasht
- Elevation: 457 m (1,499 ft)

Population (2016 Census)
  - Total: 1,180
- Time zone: UTC+3:30 (IRST)
- Area code: 071-52(78)
- Website: Chahkowr

Chahkowr (Persian: چاه كور) is a village in Alamarvdasht Rural District, Alamarvdasht District, Lamerd County, Fars province, Iran. At the 2016 Census, its population was 1,180, in 341 families.

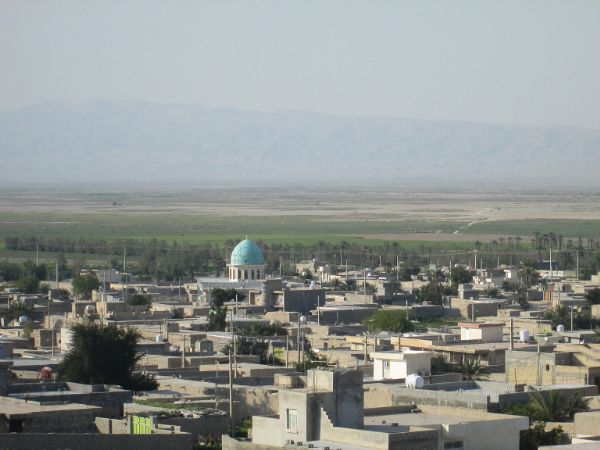
Chahkowr from the hillside
