= Kheshti =

Kheshti خشتي
- Village
- Location within Iran
- Coordinates: 27°39′58″N 53°05′08″E
- Country: Iran
- Province: Fars
- County: Lamerd
- Bakhsh: Alamarvdasht
- Rural District: Alamarvdasht

Population (2006)
  - Total: 177
- Time zone: UTC+3:30 (IRST)
  - Summer (DST): UTC+4:30 (IRDT)

Kheshti (Persian: خشتي, also Romanized as Kheshtī; also known as Khishti) is a village in Alamarvdasht Rural District, Alamarvdasht District, Lamerd County, Fars province, Iran. At the 2006 census, its population was 177, in 34 families.
