= Seyyed Hashemi =

Seyyed Hashemi سيدهاشمي
- Village
- Location within Iran
- Coordinates: 27°38′58″N 52°57′28″E
- Country: Iran
- Province: Fars
- County: Lamerd
- Bakhsh: Alamarvdasht
- Rural District: Alamarvdasht

Population (2006)
  - Total: 291
- Time zone: UTC+3:30 (IRST)
  - Summer (DST): UTC+4:30 (IRDT)

Seyyed Hashemi (Persian: سيدهاشمي, also Romanized as Seyyed Hāshemī and Seid Hashemi; also known as Seyyed Hāshem and Seyyed Hāshen) is a village in Alamarvdasht Rural District, Alamarvdasht District, Lamerd County, Fars province, Iran. At the 2006 census, its population was 291, in 65 families.
