= Gahluyeh =

Gahluyeh گهلويه
- Village
- Location within Iran
- Coordinates: 27°40′22″N 53°03′36″E
- Country: Iran
- Province: Fars
- County: Lamerd
- Bakhsh: Alamarvdasht
- Rural District: Alamarvdasht

Population (2006)
  - Total: 202
- Time zone: UTC+3:30 (IRST)
  - Summer (DST): UTC+4:30 (IRDT)

Gahluyeh (Persian: گهلويه, also Romanized as Gahlūyeh; also known as Gahlū, Kahlooyeh, and Kahlūyeh) is a village in Alamarvdasht Rural District, Alamarvdasht District, Lamerd County, Fars province, Iran. At the 2006 census, its population was 202, in 38 families.
