= Zaz =

Zaz may refer to:

== Places ==
- İzbırak, Midyat, or Zaz, a village in Turkey
- Zaz-e Gharbi Rural District, an administrative subdivision of Iran
- Zaz-e Sharqi Rural District, an administrative subdivision of Iran
- IATA airport code for Zaragoza Airport, Spain

== Music ==
- Zaz (singer), stage name of French singer-songwriter Isabelle Geffroy
- "Zaz Turned Blue", a song from the 1983 Was (Not Was) album Born to Laugh at Tornadoes
- Zaz (album)

== Others ==
- ZAZ, a Ukrainian automobile manufacturer
- Zucker, Abrahams and Zucker, an American comedy film-making trio
- ZAZ (TV channel), a defunct children-oriented cable channel from Mexico
- Zaz, a former Brazilian Internet service provider now part of Terra Networks
- Zaz (video game), an open-source tile-matching puzzle game similar to Zuma

== See also ==
- Zazz
