= Zazeh =

Zazeh ززه
- Village
- Location within Iran
- Coordinates: 27°47′50″N 52°44′32″E
- Country: Iran
- Province: Fars
- County: Lamerd
- Bakhsh: Alamarvdasht
- Rural District: Alamarvdasht

Population (2006)
  - Total: 78
- Time zone: UTC+3:30 (IRST)
  - Summer (DST): UTC+4:30 (IRDT)

Zazeh (Persian: ززه; also known as Zazz) is a village in Alamarvdasht Rural District, Alamarvdasht District, Lamerd County, Fars province, Iran. At the 2006 census, its population was 78, in 21 families.
