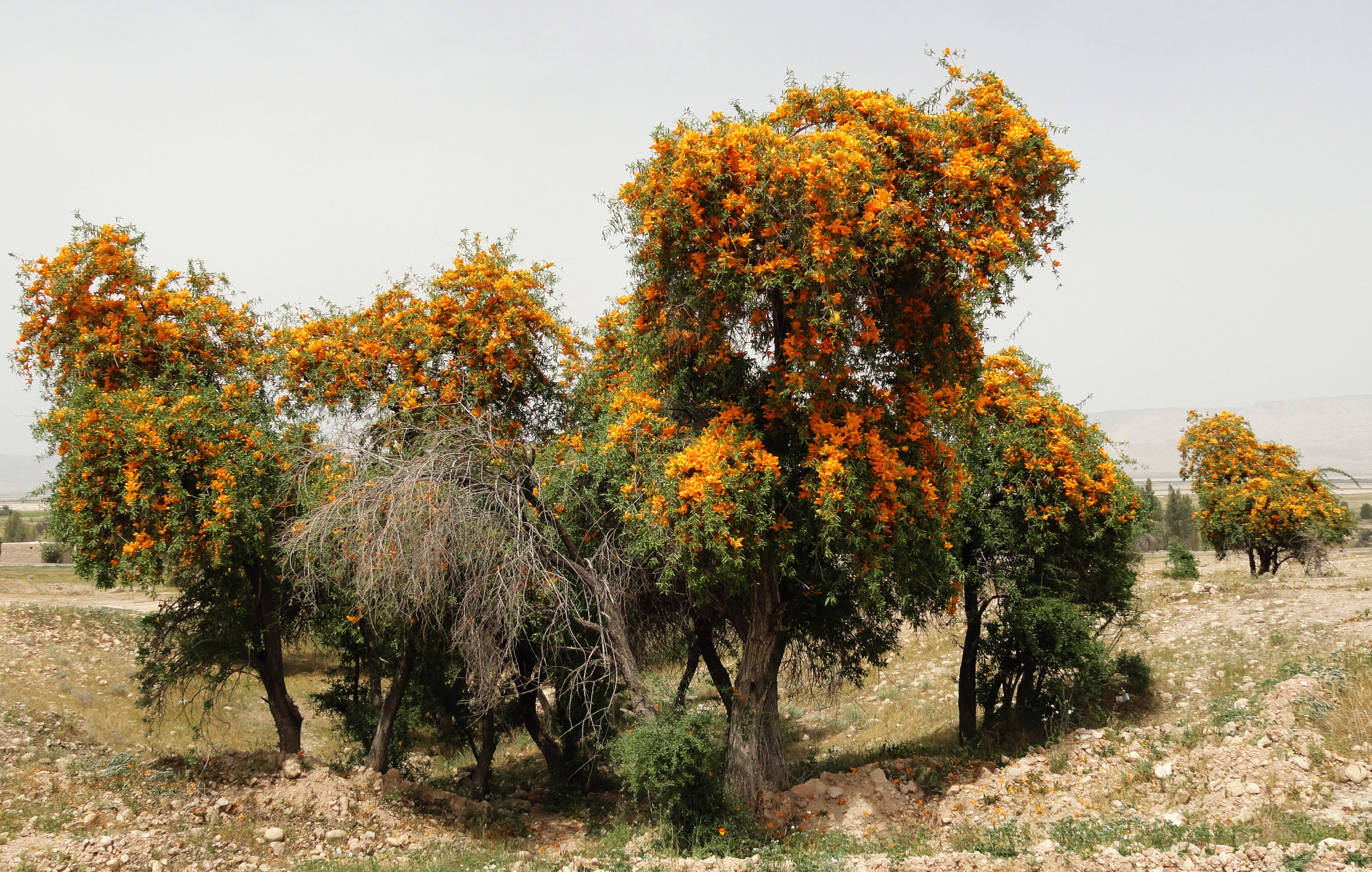
- Tecomella undulata in Alamarvdasht, Iran

Conservation status
- Endangered (IUCN 3.1)

Scientific classification
- Kingdom: Plantae
- Clade: Tracheophytes
- Clade: Angiosperms
- Clade: Eudicots
- Clade: Asterids
- Order: Lamiales
- Family: Bignoniaceae
- Genus: Tecomella; Seem.
- Species: T. undulata

Binomial name
- Tecomella undulata (Sm.) Seem.

= Tecomella =

Genus of trees

Tecomella undulata is a tree species found in Oman and from southwest Iran to northwest India. It is the only species in the monotypic genus Tecomella. It is a medium-sized tree that produces quality timber and is the main source of timber amongst the indigenous tree species of desert regions of Shekhawati and Marwar in the Indian state of Rajasthan where it is locally known as rohida and serves as the state symbol. The trade name of the tree species is desert teak or Marwar teak. The trade name of the tree species is desert teak or Marwar teak.

== Uses ==
Tecomella undulata is traditionally used in Ayurvedic and folk medicine. Various parts of the plant are believed to support treatments for liver disorders, skin diseases, and inflammation. It is also valued for its timber and is sometimes cultivated for both medicinal and ecological purposes.

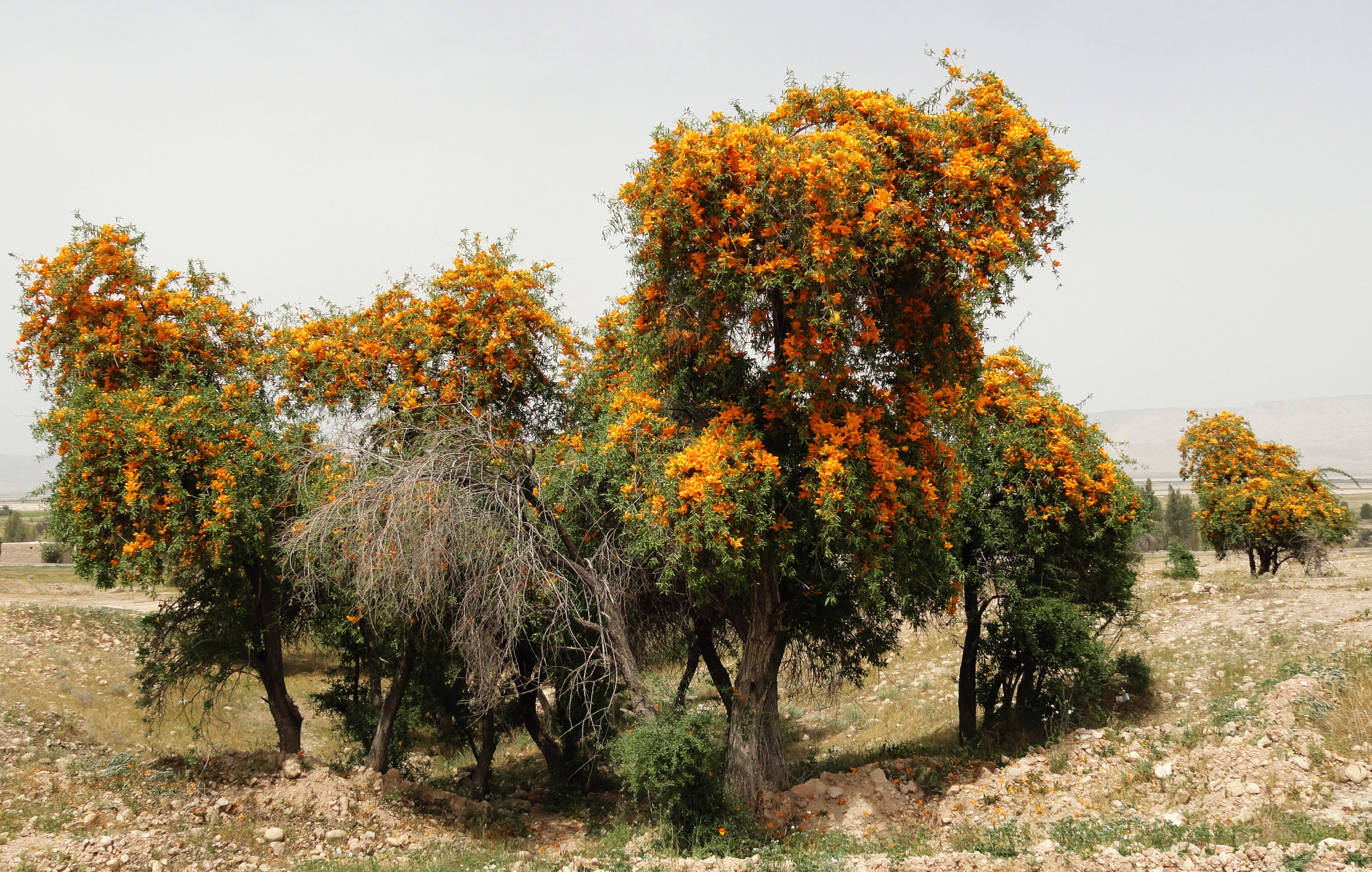
Tree in Alamarvdasht, Fars, Iran

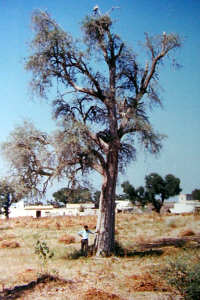
Tree at the village of Harsawa

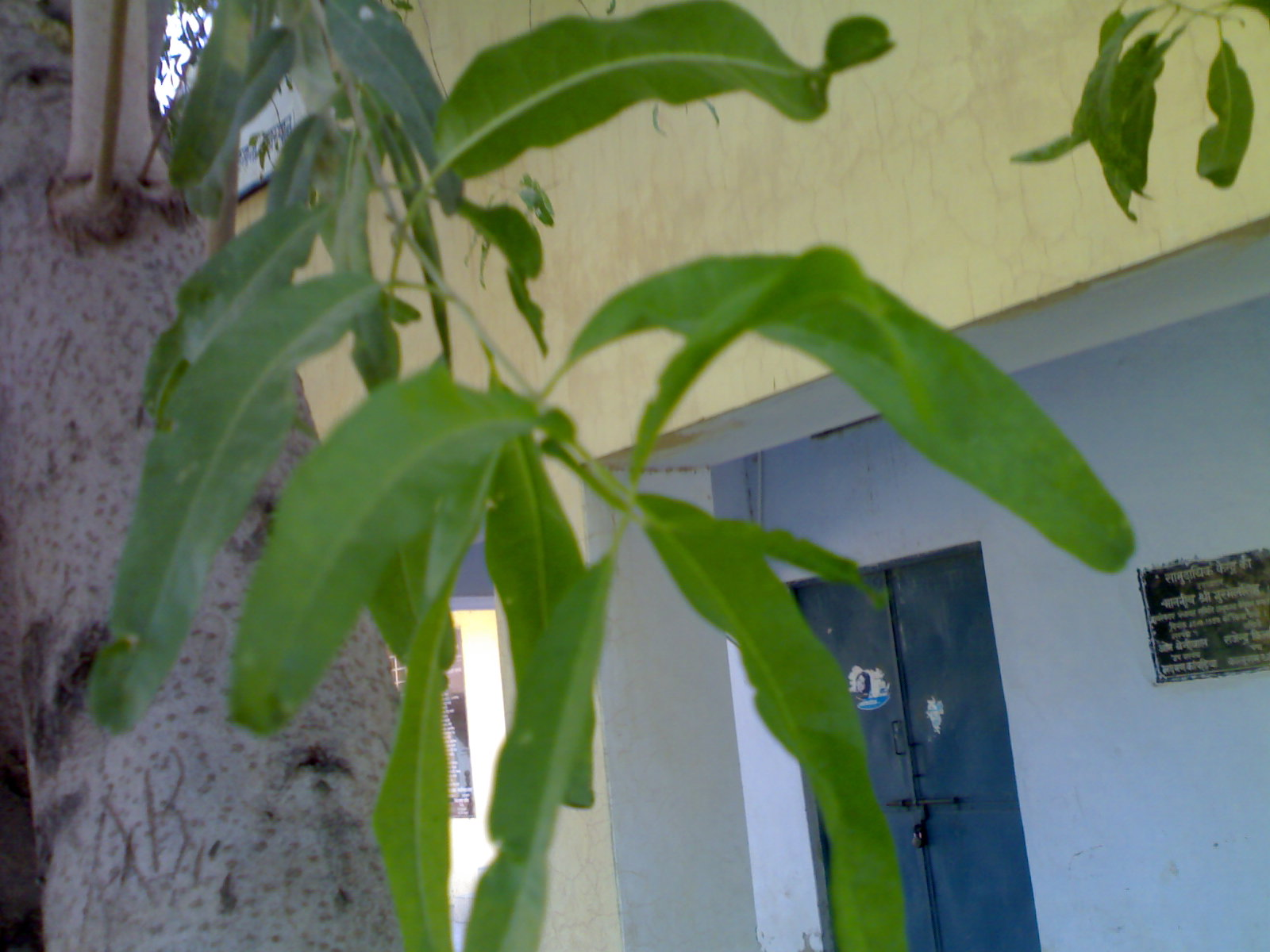
Leaves at the village of Gharsana, India

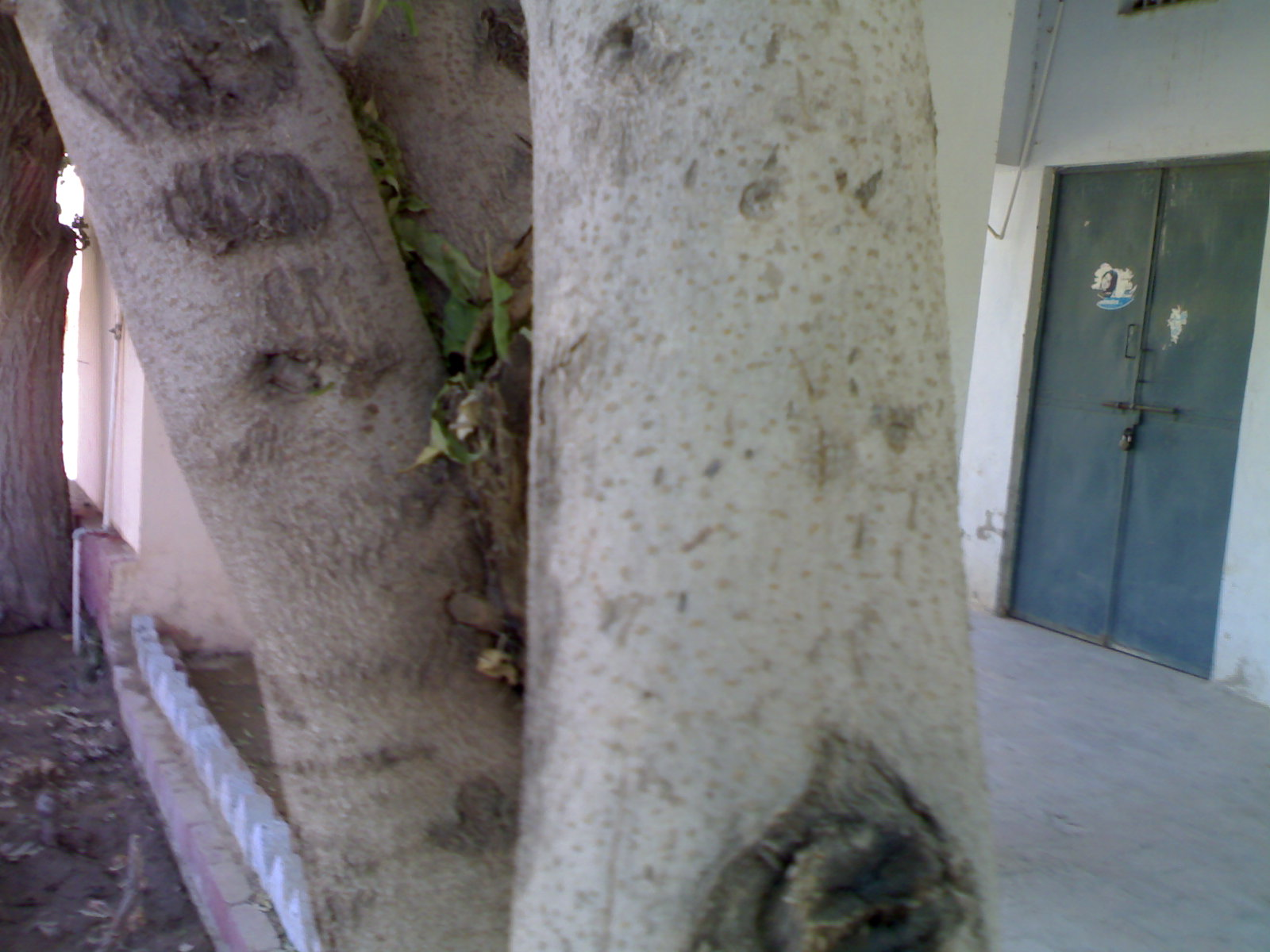
Trunk at Gharsana

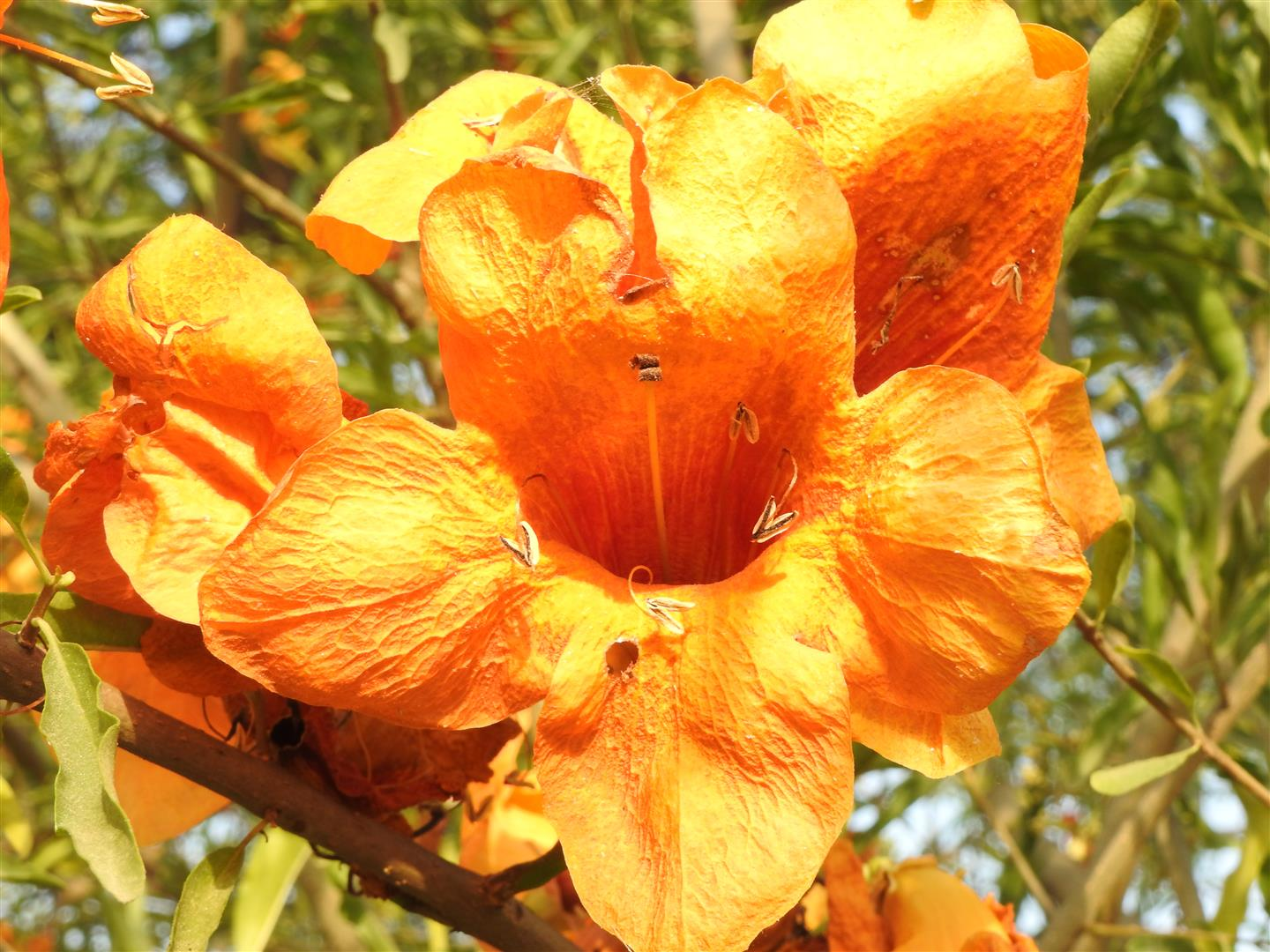
Flower in Punjab, India

== Gallery ==
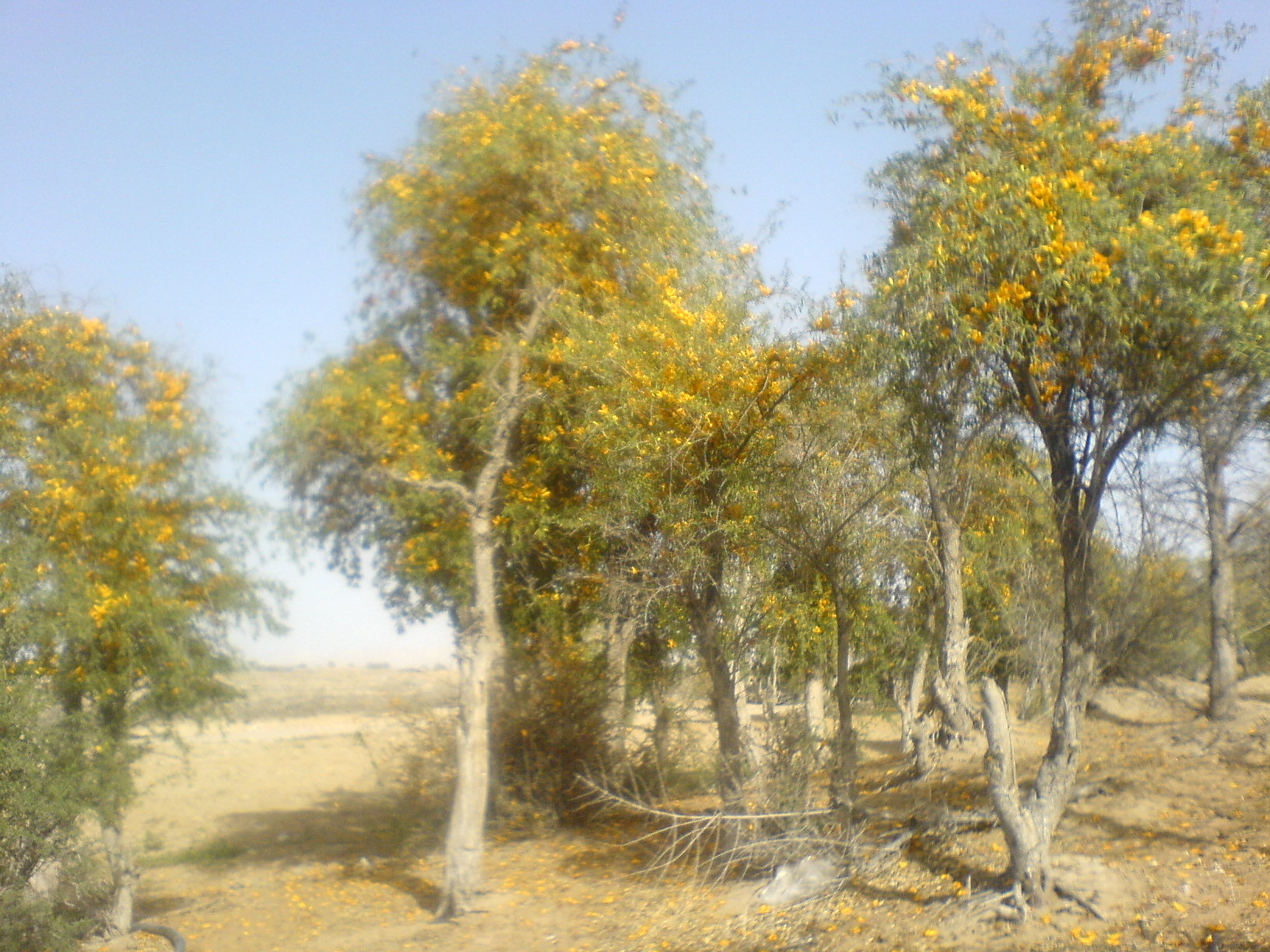
Cluster of trees in Bushehr province, Iran

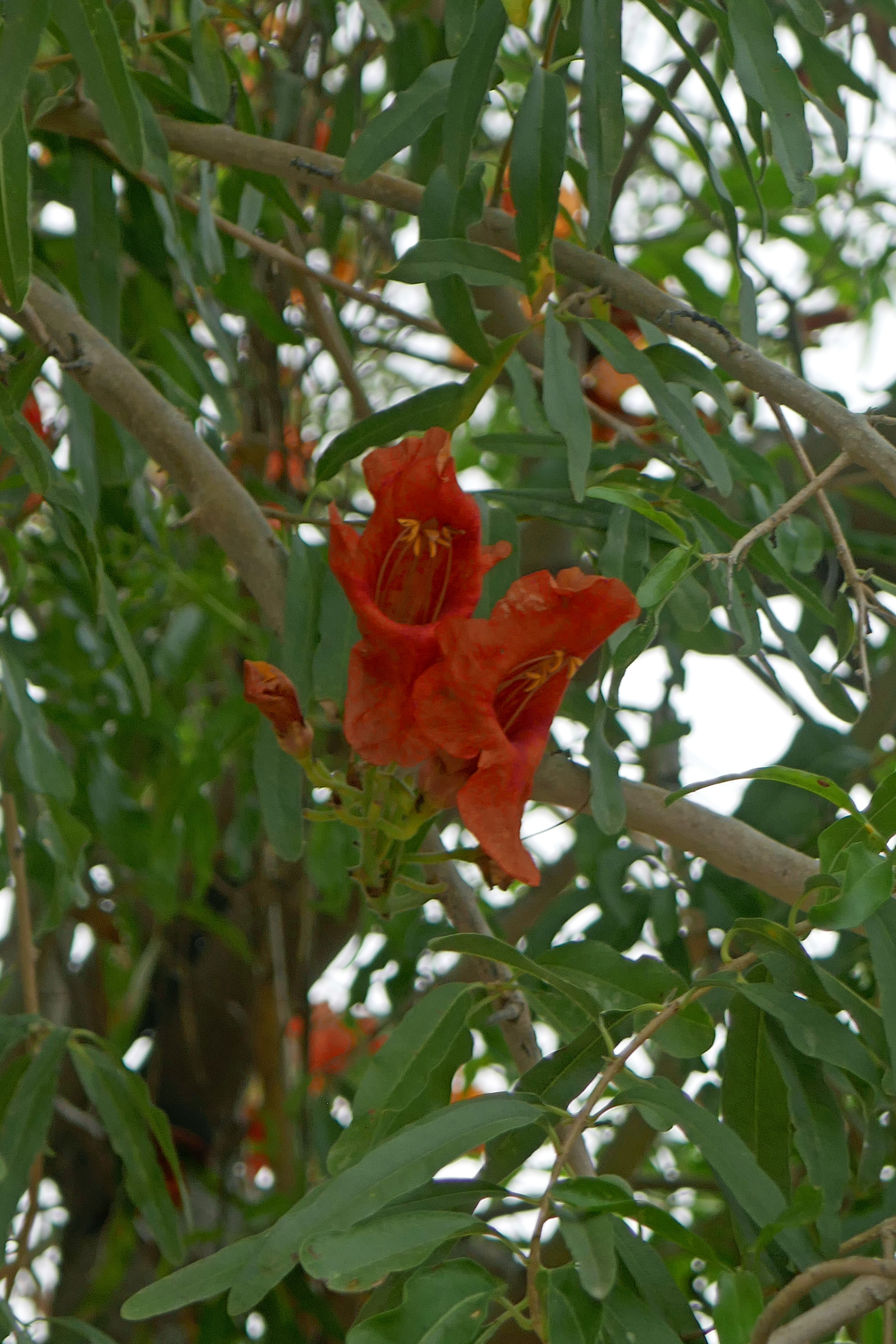
Flowers and foliage in Thar desert, Rajasthan

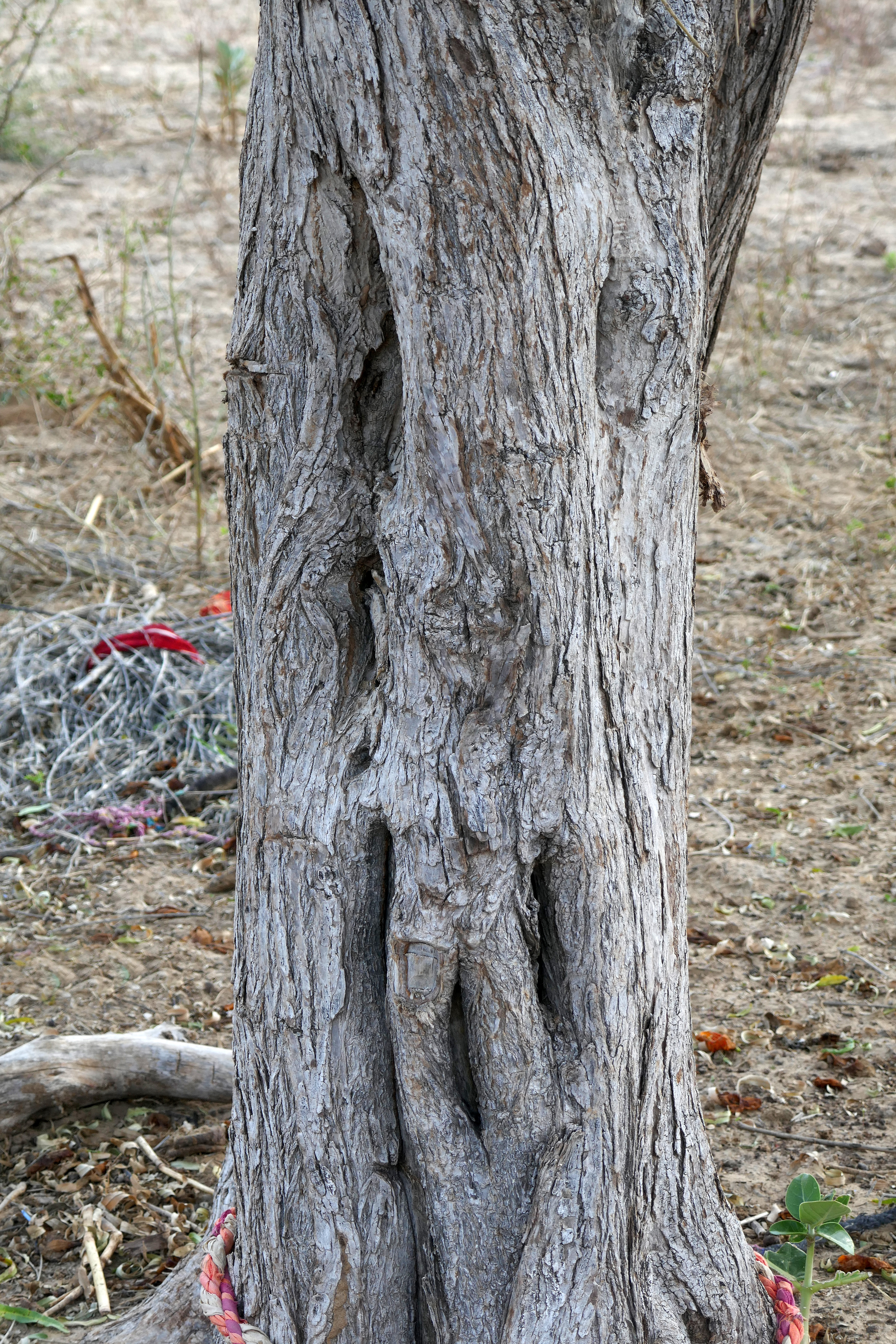
Trunk in thar desert, Rajasthan

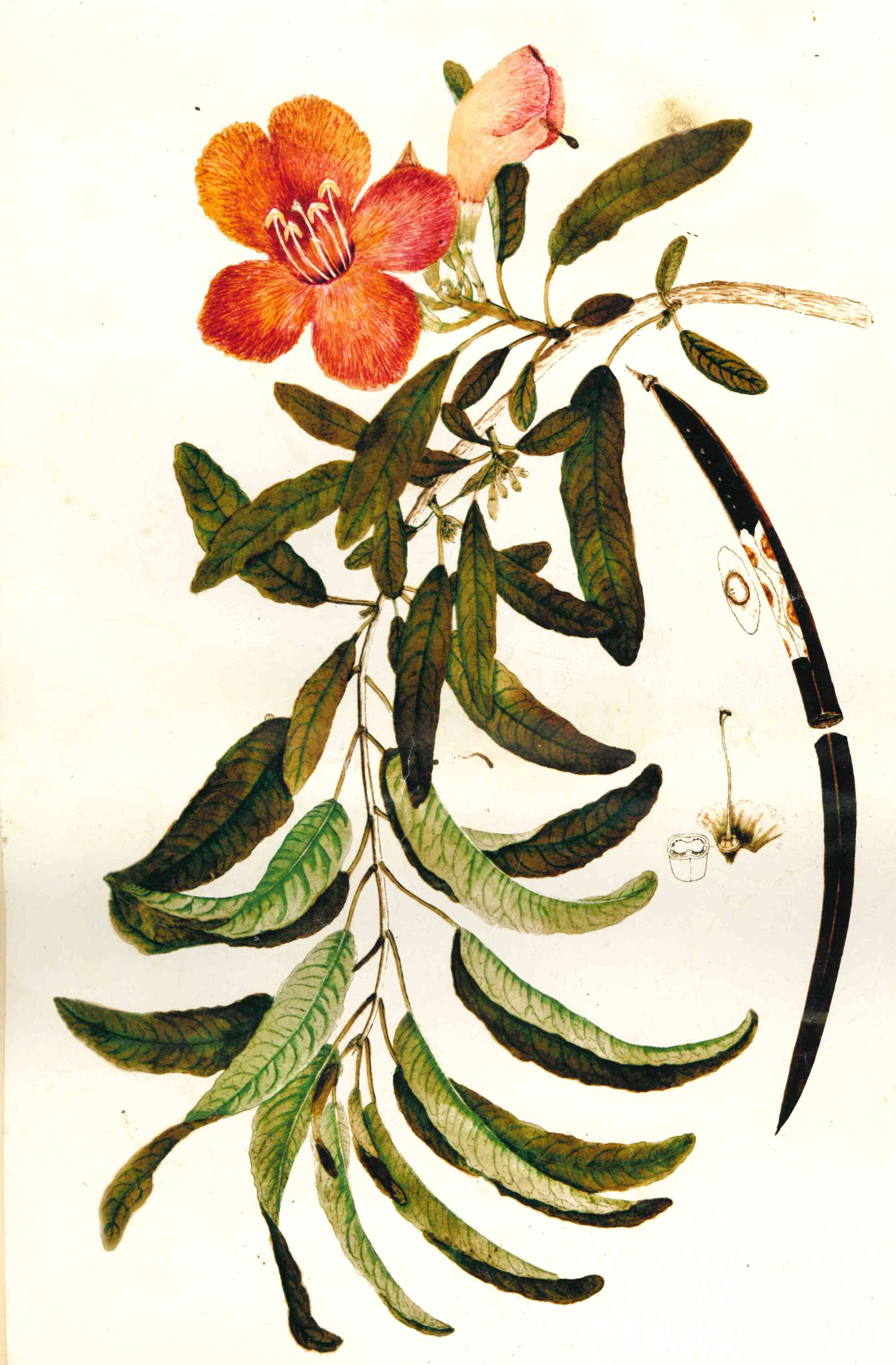
Botanical drawing of tecomella

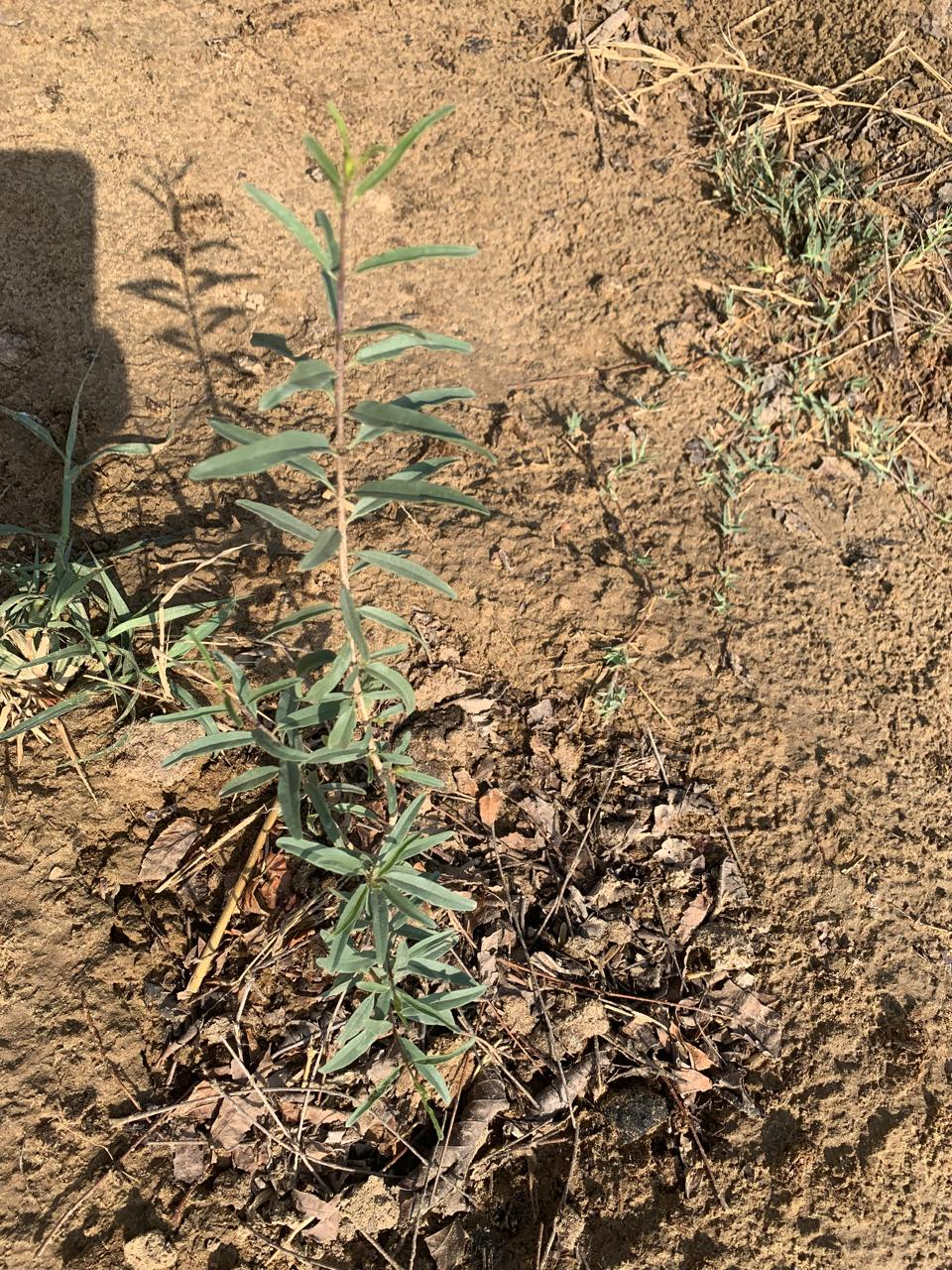
Year old sapling in Punjab, India
