= Yuzi (disambiguation) =

Yuzi may refer to:

- Yuxiong, called Yuzi or Master Yu
  - Yuzi (book) zh:鬻子, attributed to Yuxiong
- Yuzi, East Azerbaijan, Iran
- Yuzi, Fars, Iran
- Yuzi, Portuguese rapper
- Yuzvendra Chahal, Indian cricketer often called by his nickname Yuzi
