= Porzi =

Porzi پرزي
- Village
- Location within Iran
- Coordinates: 27°41′18″N 53°01′03″E
- Country: Iran
- Province: Fars
- County: Lamerd
- Bakhsh: Alamarvdasht
- Rural District: Alamarvdasht

Population (2006)
  - Total: 104
- Time zone: UTC+3:30 (IRST)
  - Summer (DST): UTC+4:30 (IRDT)

Porzi (Persian: پرزي, also Romanized as Porzī; also known as Pordī and Yūzī) is a village in Alamarvdasht Rural District, Alamarvdasht District, Lamerd County, Fars province, Iran. At the 2006 census, its population was 104, in 24 families.
