= Tammaru =

Tamroo تمرو
- Village
- Location within Iran
- Coordinates: 27°31′53″N 53°13′03″E
- Country: Iran
- Province: Fars
- County: Lamerd
- Bakhsh: Alamarvdasht

Population (2006)
  - Total: 108
- Time zone: UTC+3:30 (IRST)
  - Summer (DST): UTC+4:30 (IRDT)

Tammaru (Persian: تمرو, also Romanized as Tammarū and Tamrū) is a village in Kheyrgu Rural District, Alamarvdasht District, Lamerd County, Fars province, Iran. At the 2006 census, its population was 108, in 24 families.
