= Bal Bali, Fars =

Bal Bali بلبلي
- Village
- Location within Iran
- Coordinates: 27°52′02″N 52°39′20″E
- Country: Iran
- Province: Fars
- County: Lamerd
- Bakhsh: Alamarvdasht
- Rural District: Alamarvdasht

Population (2006)
  - Total: 77
- Time zone: UTC+3:30 (IRST)
  - Summer (DST): UTC+4:30 (IRDT)

Bal Bali (Persian: بلبلي, also Romanized as Bal Balī and Bal Balī; also known as Balelī, Baleylī, and Balīlī) is a village in Alamarvdasht Rural District, Alamarvdasht District, Lamerd County, Fars province, Iran. At the 2006 census, its population was 77, in 22 families.

== See also ==
- Pini Balili (born 1979), Israeli footballer
