= Kahnuyeh, Lamerd =

Village in Fars province, Iran

Kahnuyeh Persian: كهنويه
- Village
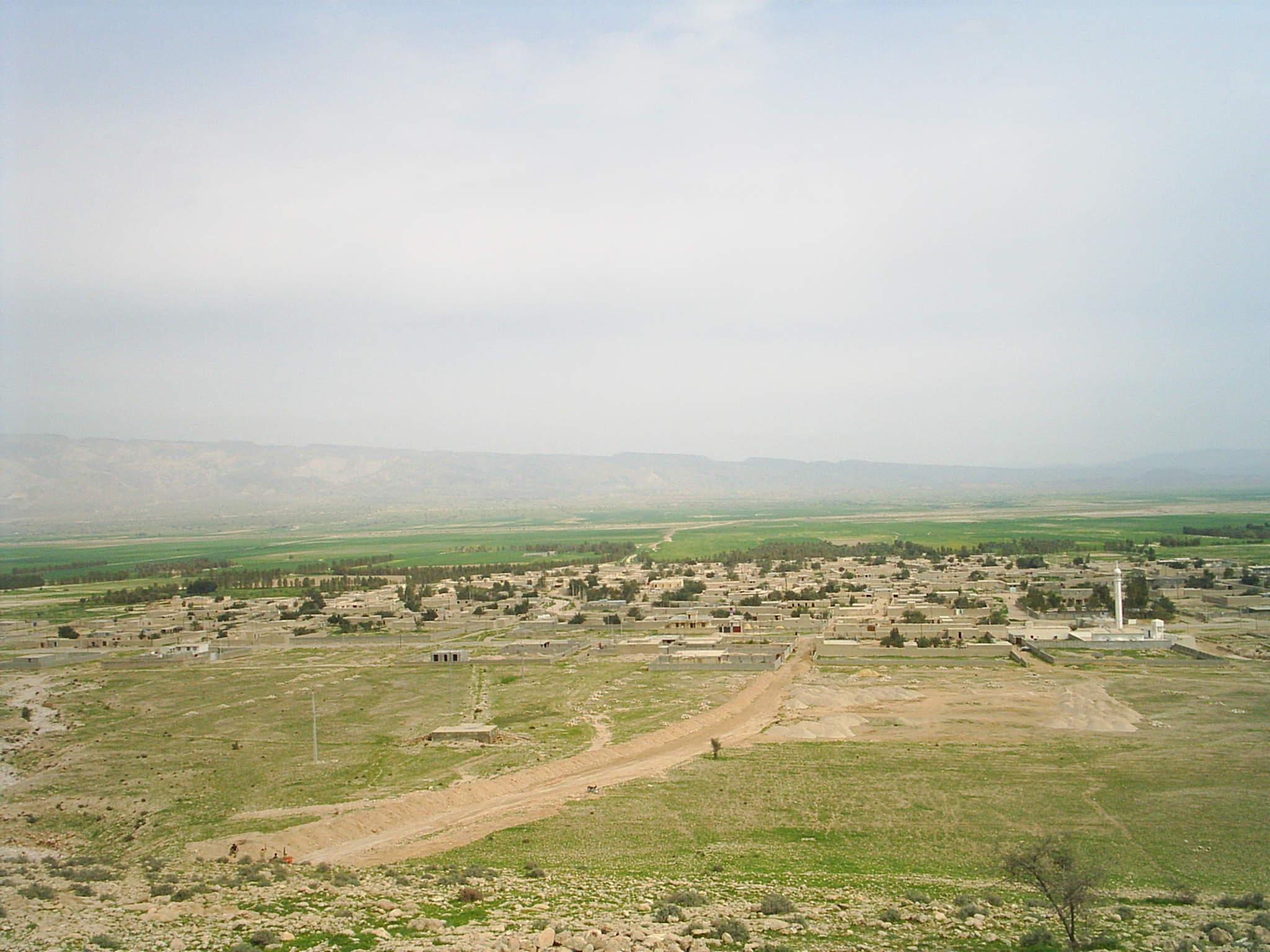
- Kahnuyeh

- Location within Iran
- Coordinates: 27°39′44″N 52°56′25″E
- Country: Iran
- Province: Fars
- County: Lamerd
- District: Alamarvdasht
- Rural District: Kahnuyeh

Population (2016)
  - Total: 1,540
- Time zone: UTC+3:30 (IRST)

Kahnuyeh (Persian: كهنويه) (Note: Also romanized as Kahnowyeh and Kahnūyeh; also known as Kahnoo and Kahnow) is a village in, and the capital of, Kahnuyeh Rural District of Alamarvdasht District, Lamerd County, Fars province, Iran.

== Demographics ==
=== Population ===
At the time of the 2006 National Census, the village's population was 1,252 in 239 households, when it was in Alamarvdasht Rural District. The following census in 2011 counted 1,581 people in 423 households. The 2016 census measured the population of the village as 1,540 people in 444 households. It was the most populous village in its rural district.

After the census, Kahnuyeh was transferred to Kahnuyeh Rural District created in Alamarvdasht District.
