= Bolboli, Hormozgan =

Bolboli بلبلي
- Village
- Location within Iran
- Coordinates: 27°10′34″N 57°00′40″E
- Country: Iran
- Province: Hormozgan
- County: Minab
- Bakhsh: Central
- Rural District: Howmeh

Population (2006)
  - Total: 594
- Time zone: UTC+3:30 (IRST)
  - Summer (DST): UTC+4:30 (IRDT)

Bolboli (Persian: بلبلي, also Romanized as Bolbolī) is a village in Howmeh Rural District, in the Central District of Minab County, Hormozgan Province, Iran. At the 2006 census, its population was 594, in 120 families.
