= Kahnuyeh Rural District =

Rural district in Fars province, Iran

Kahnuyeh Rural District Persian: دهستان کهنویه
- Rural District
- Location within Iran
- Coordinates: 27°46′18″N 52°51′20″E
- Country: Iran
- Province: Fars
- County: Lamerd
- District: Alamarvdasht
- Capital: Kahnuyeh
- Time zone: UTC+3:30 (IRST)

Kahnuyeh Rural District (Persian: دهستان کهنویه) is in Alamarvdasht District of Lamerd County, Fars province, Iran. Its capital is the village of Kahnuyeh, whose population at the time of the 2016 National Census was 1,540 in 444 households.

== History ==
Kahnuyeh Rural District was created in Alamarvdasht District after the 2016 census.
