= Kahnaviyeh-ye Olya va Sofla =

Kahnaviyeh-ye Olya va Sofla كهنويه علياوسفلي
- Village
- Location within Iran
- Coordinates: 32°48′06″N 52°49′35″E
- Country: Iran
- Province: Isfahan
- County: Nain
- Bakhsh: Central
- Rural District: Kuhestan

Population (2006)
  - Total: 10
- Time zone: UTC+3:30 (IRST)
  - Summer (DST): UTC+4:30 (IRDT)

Kahnaviyeh-ye Olya va Sofla (Persian: كهنويه علياوسفلي, also Romanized as Kahnavīyeh-ye ‘Olyā va Soflá; also known as Kahnavīyeh and Kahnū’īyeh) is a village in Kuhestan Rural District, in the Central District of Nain County, Isfahan Province, Iran. At the 2006 census, its population was 10, in 4 families.
