= Alamarvdasht =

City in Fars province, Iran

Alamarvdasht Persian: علامرودشت
- City
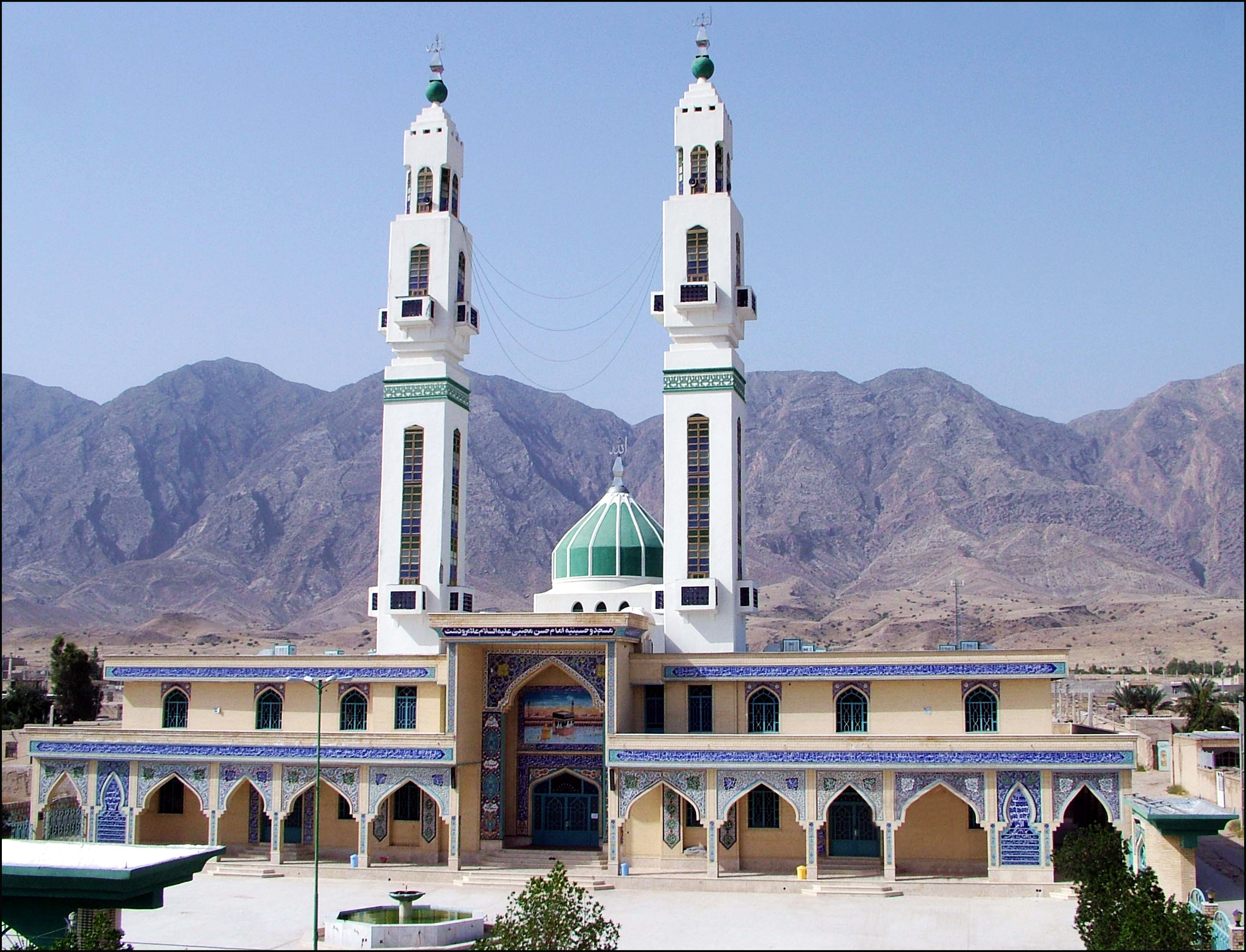
- Imam Hasan Religious and Cultural Complex in Alamarvdasht

- Location within Iran
- Coordinates: 27°37′26″N 53°00′04″E
- Country: Iran
- Province: Fars
- County: Lamerd
- District: Alamarvdasht
- Elevation: 470 m (1,540 ft)

Population (2016)
  - Total: 4,068
- Time zone: UTC+3:30 (IRST)
- Area code: 071-5278
- Website: www.alamarvdasht.com

Alamarvdasht (Persian: علامرودشت) (Note: Formerly the village of Chah Ayni (چاه عینی)) is a city in, and the capital of, Alamarvdasht District of Lamerd County, Fars province, Iran. It also serves as the administrative center for Alamarvdasht Rural District.

== Demographics ==
=== Population ===
At the time of the 2006 National Census, the city's population was 3,502 in 811 households. The following census in 2011 counted 4,095 people in 1,008 households. The 2016 census measured the population of the city as 4,068 people in 1,139 households.

== Geography ==
=== Climate ===
Alamarvdasht features a hot semi arid climate, (Köppen climate classification: BSh). Due to annual precipitation is in the range of 50%–100% of the threshold, the classification is BSh (Hot semi-arid climate).

Climate data for Alamarvdasht, Altitude: 457 M
Month	Jan	Feb	Mar	Apr	May	Jun	Jul	Aug	Sep	Oct	Nov	Dec	Year
Record high °C (°F)	30.4 (86.7)	31 (88)	36.2 (97.2)	40 (104)	47.7 (117.9)	49.6 (121.3)	49 (120)	48.6 (119.5)	47.4 (117.3)	43.4 (110.1)	39.4 (102.9)	32.8 (91.0)	49.6 (121.3)
Mean daily maximum °C (°F)	21 (70)	22 (72)	26 (79)	31.8 (89.2)	38.9 (102.0)	44 (111)	45 (113)	44 (111)	41.9 (107.4)	38 (100)	31 (88)	24 (75)	34.0 (93.1)
Mean daily minimum °C (°F)	7 (45)	8.1 (46.6)	11 (52)	14.09 (57.36)	20.38 (68.68)	23 (73)	26 (79)	26 (79)	23.3 (73.9)	19 (66)	14 (57)	9 (48)	16.74 (62.13)
Record low °C (°F)	−2.8 (27.0)	−1 (30)	3 (37)	6.4 (43.5)	10.4 (50.7)	16.6 (61.9)	19 (66)	22 (72)	17.2 (63.0)	12 (54)	4.6 (40.3)	−1 (30)	−2.8 (27.0)
Average precipitation mm (inches)	67.3 (2.65)	48.61 (1.91)	32.34 (1.27)	17.96 (0.71)	2.15 (0.08)	1.37 (0.05)	2.02 (0.08)	9.12 (0.36)	5.70 (0.22)	0.70 (0.03)	5.42 (0.21)	70.61 (2.78)	263.3 (10.35)
Average rainy days	5	5	5	4	1	0	0	1	1	1	2	5	30
Average snowy days	0	0	0	0	0	0	0	0	0	0	0	0	0
Average relative humidity (%)	62	60	51	42	28	22	29	36	38	38	45	57	42
Mean monthly sunshine hours	233.2	226.1	243.4	242.7	305.1	349.5	323.0	305.8	310.9	295.0	269.2	242.0	3,345.9

== See also ==
Media related to Alamarvdasht at Wikimedia Commons
