= Alamarvdasht Rural District =

Rural district in Fars province, Iran

Alamarvdasht Rural District Persian: دهستان علامرودشت
- Rural District
- Location within Iran
- Coordinates: 27°37′28″N 53°00′13″E
- Country: Iran
- Province: Fars
- County: Lamerd
- District: Alamarvdasht
- Capital: Alamarvdasht

Population (2016)
  - Total: 6,511
- Time zone: UTC+3:30 (IRST)

Alamarvdasht Rural District (Persian: دهستان علامرودشت) is in Alamarvdasht District of Lamerd County, Fars province, Iran. It is administered from the city of Alamarvdasht. (Note: Formerly the village of Chah Ayni)

== Demographics ==
=== Population ===
At the time of the 2006 National Census, the rural district's population was 5,154 in 1,049 households. There were 6,050 inhabitants in 1,549 households at the following census of 2011. The 2016 census measured the population of the rural district as 6,511 in 1,889 households. The most populous of its 34 villages was Kahnuyeh, with 1,540 people.
