= Alamarvdasht District =

District in Fars province, Iran

Alamarvdasht District Persian: بخش علامرودشت
- District
- Location within Iran
- Coordinates: 27°42′57″N 52°54′19″E
- Country: Iran
- Province: Fars
- County: Lamerd
- Capital: Alamarvdasht

Population (2016)
  - Total: 19,190
- Time zone: UTC+3:30 (IRST)

Alamarvdasht District (Persian: بخش علامرودشت) is in Lamerd County, Fars province, Iran. Its capital is the city of Alamarvdasht. (Note: Formerly the village of Chah Ayni)

== History ==
After the 2016 National Census, Kahnuyeh Rural District was created in the district, and Kheyrgu Rural District was separated from it in the formation of Kheyrgu District.

== Demographics ==
=== Population ===
At the time of the 2006 census, the district's population was 14,915 in 3,174 households. The following census in 2011 counted 16,902 people in 4,309 households. The 2016 census measured the population of the district as 19,190 inhabitants in 5,557 households.

=== Administrative divisions ===
Alamarvdasht District Population
Administrative Divisions	2006	2011	2016
Alamarvdasht RD	5,154	6,050	6,511
Kahnuyeh RD (Note: Established after the 2016 census)			
Kheyrgu RD (Note: Transferred to Kheyrgu District after the 2016 census)	6,259	6,757	8,611
Alamarvdasht (city)	3,502	4,095	4,068
Total	14,915	16,902	19,190
RD = Rural District
