= Abanar =

Abanar or Ab-e Anar or Ab Anar (Persian: آب‌انار or آب انار) may refer to:

- Ab Anar, Marvdasht, Fars Province
- Abanar, Ilam
- Ab Anar, Khuzestan
- Abanar Rural District, in Ilam Province
