= Yellow rice =

Rice dish made yellow with spices

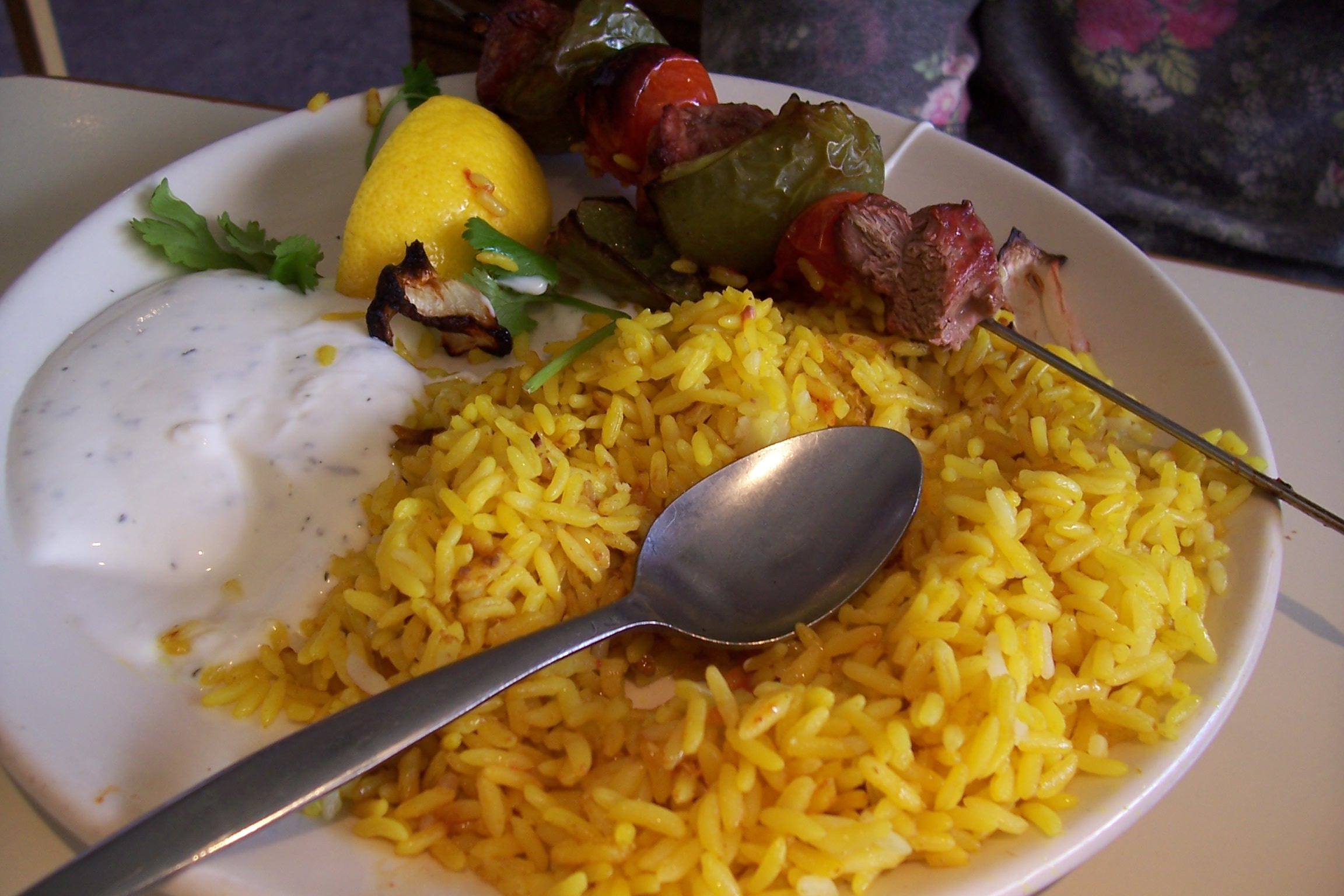
Afghani lamb kebab and yellow rice

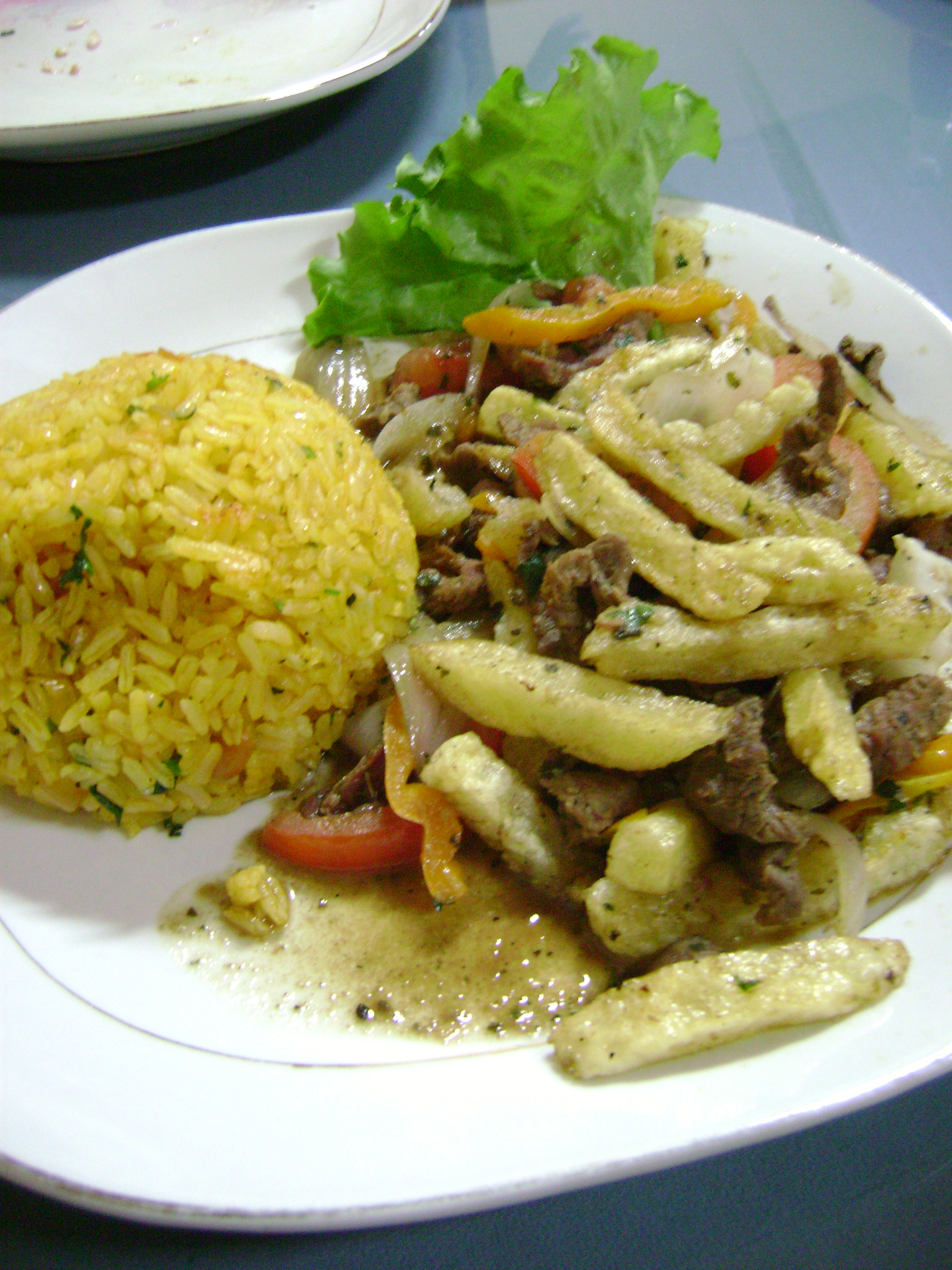
Lomo saltado served with arroz amarillo (yellow rice) in Peruvian cuisine

Yellow rice is a traditional yellow-colored rice dish in Iranian, Middle East, Moroccan, Ecuadorian, Peruvian, Caribbean, Portuguese, Filipino, Afghan, Indian, Sri Lankan, South African and Indonesian cuisines. It is made using white rice turned yellow by annatto, saffron or turmeric.

South African yellow rice, with its origins in Cape Malay cuisine, influenced by Indonesian cuisine, is traditionally made with raisins, sugar, and cinnamon, making a very sweet rice dish served as an accompaniment to savoury dishes and curries.

In Sri Lanka, it is known as kaha buth and draws from both Indonesian and Sri Lankan influences.

In Indonesia it is known as nasi kuning. In the Philippines, rice dishes cooked with turmeric include kuning and sinigapuna.

== See also ==
- Golden rice – A genetically modified variety of Oryza sativa rice that is golden-colored
- Java rice - also called "yellow fried rice", a Filipino fried rice dish with annatto or turmeric
- List of rice dishes
