= Asiab-e Kereshki =

Asiab-e Kereshki اسياب كرشكي
- Village
- Location within Iran
- Coordinates: 30°01′08″N 52°58′18″E
- Country: Iran
- Province: Fars
- County: Marvdasht
- Bakhsh: Seyyedan
- Rural District: Khafrak-e Olya

Population (2006)
  - Total: 58
- Time zone: UTC+3:30 (IRST)
  - Summer (DST): UTC+4:30 (IRDT)

Asiab-e Kereshki (Persian: اسياب كرشكي, also Romanized as Āsīāb-e Kereshkī; also known as Kāz̧emīyeh) is a village in Khafrak-e Olya Rural District, Seyyedan District, Marvdasht County, Fars province, Iran. At the 2006 census, its population was 58, in 13 families.
