= Ruzian =

Ruzian روزيان
- Village
- Location within Iran
- Coordinates: 29°54′48″N 53°05′40″E
- Country: Iran
- Province: Fars
- County: Marvdasht
- Bakhsh: Seyyedan
- Rural District: Rahmat

Population (2006)
  - Total: 475
- Time zone: UTC+3:30 (IRST)
  - Summer (DST): UTC+4:30 (IRDT)

Ruzian (Persian: روزيان, also Romanized as Rūzīān; also known as Rūznīyān) is a village in Rahmat Rural District, Seyyedan District, Marvdasht County, Fars province, Iran. At the 2006 census, its population was 475, in 100 families.
