= Bozmiyan =

Bazmiyan بزميان
- Village
- Location within Iran
- Coordinates: 29°57′05″N 53°00′54″E
- Country: Iran
- Province: Fars
- County: Marvdasht
- Bakhsh: Seyyedan
- Rural District: Rahmat

Population (2006)
  - Total: 693
- Time zone: UTC+3:30 (IRST)
  - Summer (DST): UTC+4:30 (IRDT)

Bazmiyan (Persian: بزميان, also Romanized as Bazmiyan, Baz Meyān, and Baz Mīān) is a village in Rahmat Rural District, Seyyedan District, Marvdasht County, Fars province, Iran. At the 2006 census, its population was 693, in 173 families.
