= Mansurabad, Seyyedan =

Mansurabad منصوراباد
- Village
- Location within Iran
- Coordinates: 30°02′12″N 52°57′26″E
- Country: Iran
- Province: Fars
- County: Marvdasht
- Bakhsh: Seyyedan
- Rural District: Khafrak-e Olya

Population (2006)
  - Total: 70
- Time zone: UTC+3:30 (IRST)
  - Summer (DST): UTC+4:30 (IRDT)

Mansurabad (Persian: منصوراباد, also Romanized as Manşūrābād) is a village in Khafrak-e Olya Rural District, Seyyedan District, Marvdasht County, Fars province, Iran. At the 2006 census, its population was 70, in 16 families.
