= Sarabad =

Sarabad سراباد
- Village
- Location within Iran
- Coordinates: 29°47′54″N 53°08′12″E
- Country: Iran
- Province: Fars
- County: Marvdasht
- Bakhsh: Seyyedan
- Rural District: Rahmat

Population (2006)
  - Total: 141
- Time zone: UTC+3:30 (IRST)
  - Summer (DST): UTC+4:30 (IRDT)

Sarabad (Persian: سراباد, also Romanized as Sarābād) is a village in Rahmat Rural District, Seyyedan District, Marvdasht County, Fars province, Iran. At the 2006 census, its population was 141, in 40 families.
