= Paru =

Paru may refer to:

- a village in Coșteiu, Romania
- Paru, Iran, a village in Semnan Province, Iran
- Paru, Fars, a village in Fars Province, Iran
- A fried cow lung in Indonesian cuisine dish from Padang
- Rita Jaima Paru, Papua New Guinean food entrepreneur
- Paru Itagaki, Japanese manga artist
- Paru River, a northern river in the Amazon rainforest
