= Hashtijan =

Hashtijan هشتيجان
- village
- Location within Iran
- Coordinates: 29°59′12″N 52°57′34″E
- Country: Iran
- Province: Fars
- County: Marvdasht
- Bakhsh: Seyyedan
- Rural District: Rahmat

Government

Population (2023)
  - Total: 512
- Time zone: UTC+3:30 (IRST)
  - Summer (DST): UTC+4:30 (IRDT)

Hashtijan (Persian: هشتيجان, also Romanized as Hashtījān and Hashteyjān) is a village in Rahmat Rural District, Seyyedan District, Marvdasht County, Fars province, Iran. At the 2006 census, its population was 467, in 113 families.
