= Gugi =

Gugi گوگي
- Village
- Location within Iran
- Coordinates: 29°59′39″N 53°01′43″E
- Country: Iran
- Province: Fars
- County: Marvdasht
- Bakhsh: Seyyedan
- Rural District: Khafrak-e Olya

Population (2006)
  - Total: 153
- Time zone: UTC+3:30 (IRST)
  - Summer (DST): UTC+4:30 (IRDT)

Gugi (Persian: گوگي, also Romanized as Gūgī; also known as Gooki) is a village in Khafrak-e Olya Rural District, Seyyedan District, Marvdasht County, Fars province, Iran. At the 2006 census, its population was 153, in 38 families.
