= Esmailabad, Seyyedan =

Esmailabad اسماعيل اباد
- Village
- Location within Iran
- Coordinates: 29°58′59″N 53°01′03″E
- Country: Iran
- Province: Fars
- County: Marvdasht
- Bakhsh: Seyyedan
- Rural District: Khafrak-e Olya

Population (2006)
  - Total: 213
- Time zone: UTC+3:30 (IRST)
  - Summer (DST): UTC+4:30 (IRDT)

Esmailabad (Persian: اسماعيل اباد, also Romanized as Esmā‘īlābād; also known as Esmā‘īlābād-e Khafrak and Esma‘il Abad Khafrak) is a village in Khafrak-e Olya Rural District, Seyyedan District, Marvdasht County, Fars province, Iran. At the 2006 census, its population was 213, in 56 families.
