= Dasht Bal, Fars =

Dasht Bal دشتبال
- Village
- Location within Iran
- Coordinates: 30°01′25″N 52°57′49″E
- Country: Iran
- Province: Fars
- County: Marvdasht
- Bakhsh: Seyyedan
- Rural District: Khafrak-e Olya

Population (2006)
  - Total: 510
- Time zone: UTC+3:30 (IRST)
  - Summer (DST): UTC+4:30 (IRDT)

Dasht Bal (Persian: دشتبال, also Romanized as Dasht Bāl and Dasht-e Bāl; also known as Dashtibāl) is a village in Khafrak-e Olya Rural District, Seyyedan District, Marvdasht County, Fars province, Iran. At the 2006 census, its population was 510, in 125 families.
