= Hasanabad-e Sanjarlu =

Village in Fars province, Iran

Hasanabad-e Sanjarlu Persian: حسن اباد سنجرلو
- Village
- Location within Iran
- Coordinates: 29°57′31″N 52°57′48″E
- Country: Iran
- Province: Fars
- County: Marvdasht
- District: Seyyedan
- Rural District: Rahmat

Population (2016)
  - Total: 1,648
- Time zone: UTC+3:30 (IRST)

Hasanabad-e Sanjarlu (Persian: حسن ابادسنجرلو) (Note: Also romanized as Ḩasanābād-e Sanjarlū; also known as Hasan Abad Khafrak, Ḩasanābād, and Ḩasanābād-e Khafrak) is a village in Rahmat Rural District of Seyyedan District, Marvdasht County, Fars province, Iran.

== Demographics ==
=== Population ===
At the time of the 2006 National Census, the village's population was 1,377 in 323 households. The following census in 2011 counted 1,021 people in 277 households. The 2016 census measured the population of the village as 1,648 people in 486 households. It was the most populous village in its rural district.
