= Kareh Tavi =

Village in Fars province, Iran

Kareh Tavi Persian: كره تاوي
- Village
- Location within Iran
- Coordinates: 29°52′47″N 53°04′09″E
- Country: Iran
- Province: Fars
- County: Marvdasht
- District: Seyyedan
- Rural District: Rahmat

Population (2016)
  - Total: 1,263
- Time zone: UTC+3:30 (IRST)

Kareh Tavi (Persian: كره تاوي) (Note: Also romanized as Kareh Tāvī and Kareh Ţāvī; also known as Kareh Tābī) is a village in, and the capital of, Rahmat Rural District of Seyyedan District, Marvdasht County, Fars province, Iran. The previous capital of the rural district was the village of Abbasabad.

== Demographics ==
=== Population ===
At the time of the 2006 National Census, the village's population was 1,072 in 257 households. The following census in 2011 counted 1,242 people in 344 households. The 2016 census measured the population of the village as 1,263 people in 353 households.
