= Kata-kat =

Pakistani meat dish

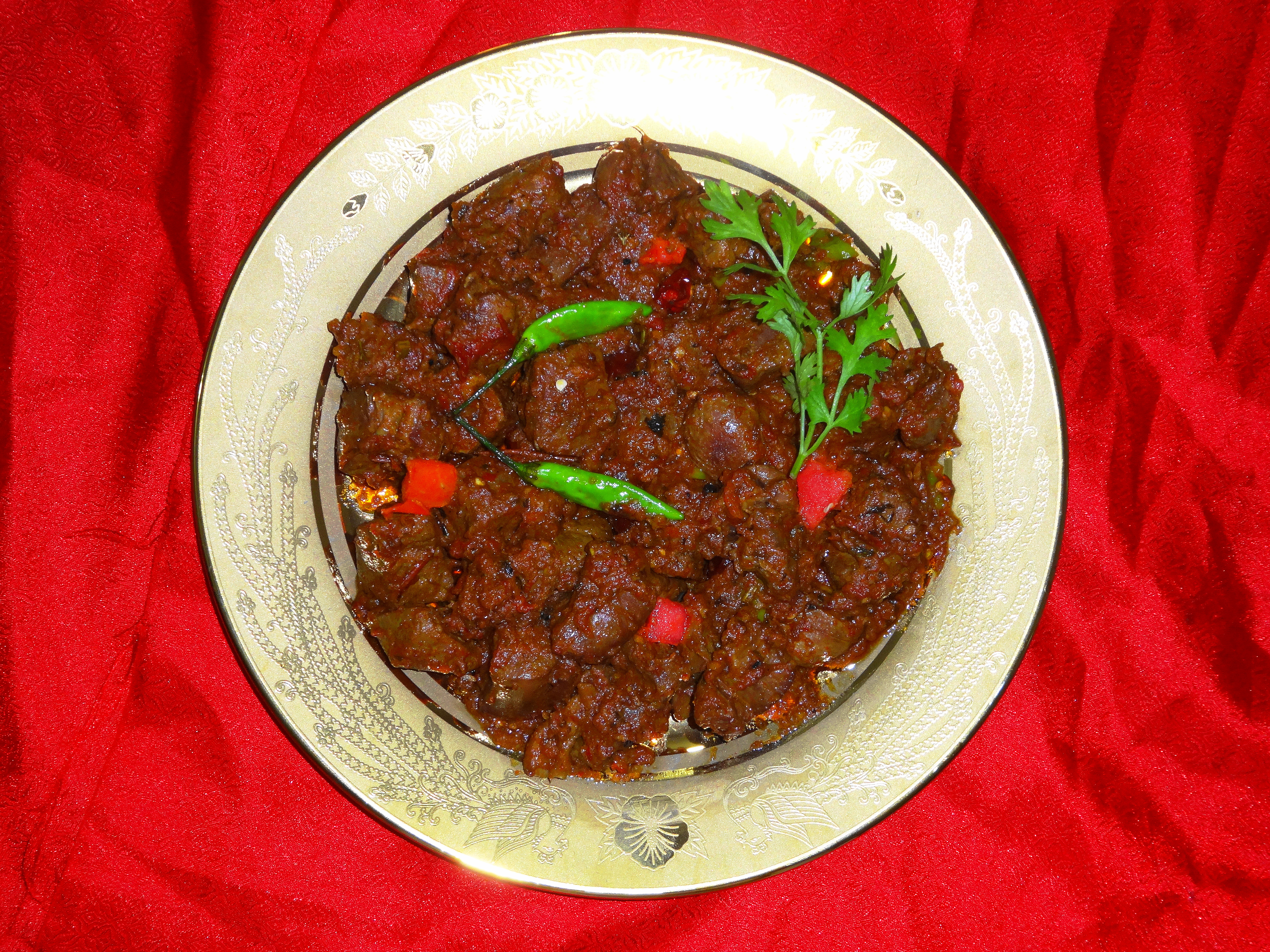
Kata-kat

Kata-kat (Urdu: کٹاکٹ) or taka-tak (Urdu: ٹکاٹک) is a meat dish popular throughout Pakistan. It is a dish originating from Karachi, Pakistan made from offal (i.e., a mixture of various meat organs), including testicles, brain, kidney, heart, liver, lungs and lamb chops in butter. The dish's name is an onomatopoeia from the sound of the two sharp blades that hit the griddle as they cut up the meat. Both tak-a-tak and kat-a-kat can be used for the dish, although the latter is more common. The dish ranks 71st in TasteAtlas’ 100 Worst Rated Foods in the World list.

== Cookware ==
Kata Kat uses flatter version of karahi as a griddle and two flat short handled karahi spatulas or implements resembling putty knives as cutting and stir-frying devices.

== See also ==
- Keema matar
