= Abbasabad, Seyyedan =

Village in Fars province, Iran

Abbasabad Persian: عباس آباد
- Village
- Location within Iran
- Coordinates: 29°53′59″N 53°02′05″E
- Country: Iran
- Province: Fars
- County: Marvdasht
- District: Seyyedan
- Rural District: Rahmat

Population (2016)
  - Total: 698
- Time zone: UTC+3:30 (IRST)

Abbasabad (Persian: عباس آباد) (Note: Also romanized as ‘Abbāsābād) is a village in, and the former capital of, Rahmat Rural District of Seyyedan District, Marvdasht County, Fars province, Iran. The capital of the rural district has been transferred to the village of Kareh Tavi.

== Demographics ==
=== Population ===
At the time of the 2006 National Census, the village's population was 602 in 145 households. The following census in 2011 counted 666 people in 188 households. The 2016 census measured the population of the village as 698 people in 210 households.
