= Dasht-e Bal =

Dasht-e Bal or Dasht Bal (Persian: دشتبال) may refer to:

- Dasht Bal, Fars
- Dasht-e Bal, Isfahan
