= Ab Anar, Marvdasht =

Ab Anar آب‌انار
- Village
- Location within Iran Location within Middle East
- Coordinates: 29°59′15″N 53°02′23″E
- Country: Iran
- Province: Fars
- County: Marvdasht
- Bakhsh: Seyyedan
- Rural District: Khafrak-e Olya

Population (2006)
  - Total: 312
- Time zone: UTC+3:30 (IRST)
  - Summer (DST): UTC+4:30 (IRDT)

Ab Anar (Persian: آب‌انار, also Romanized as Āb Anār and Āb-e Anār) is a village in Khafrak-e Olya Rural District, Seyyedan District, Marvdasht County, Fars province, Iran. At the 2006 census, its population was 312, in 82 families.
