= Mie lethek =

Indonesian traditional noodle dish

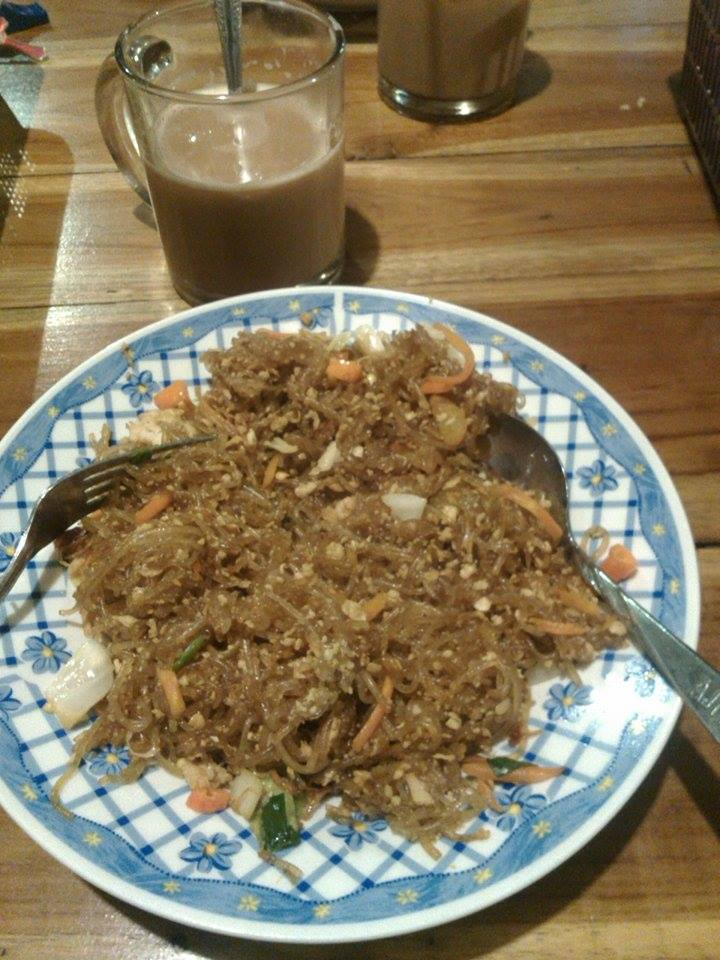
- Mie lethek
- Alternative names: Mie Lethek Garuda
- Type: Noodle
- Course: Main
- Place of origin: Indonesia
- Region or state: Yogyakarta
- Serving temperature: Hot

Mie lethek (lit. 'Ugly noodles') is a noodle dish originating from Srandakan, Bantul Regency, Special Region of Yogyakarta. This dish primarily consists of grated cassava and grated coconut, typically using a bull to process the noodles. The word "lethek" is derived from its brownish color, resembling the bark of a tree. Mie lethek is less popular in the Yogyakarta region due to competition from other dishes like petis, kuning, and instant noodles. However, in Bantul, mie lethek is well-known and enjoyed by the local community.

== History ==
During the 1920s, Umar Yassir from Yemen came to Yogyakarta for missionary work and to spread Islam. In Yogyakarta, his preaching couldn't reach many people because he used the Jawi script. Eventually, residents directed him to Kyai Bakir, a local ulema who could speak Arabic to better convey his message. Later, Kyai Bakir sent him to Srandakan, Bantul. There, Umar spread his teachings and also engaged in economic activities in Srandakan. He believed that economic activities not only sustained life but also improved it. Consequently, in 1940, he established a noodle factory in Srandakan.

Umar's factory was named Garuda Noodle Factory and operated until 1983 before closing in 2003 due to employees leaving for stone carving work in Lèpèn Praga. However, when stone carving work became scarce, the locals requested Umar's family to reopen the factory. The Garuda Noodle Factory continues to operate.

== Noodle processing ==
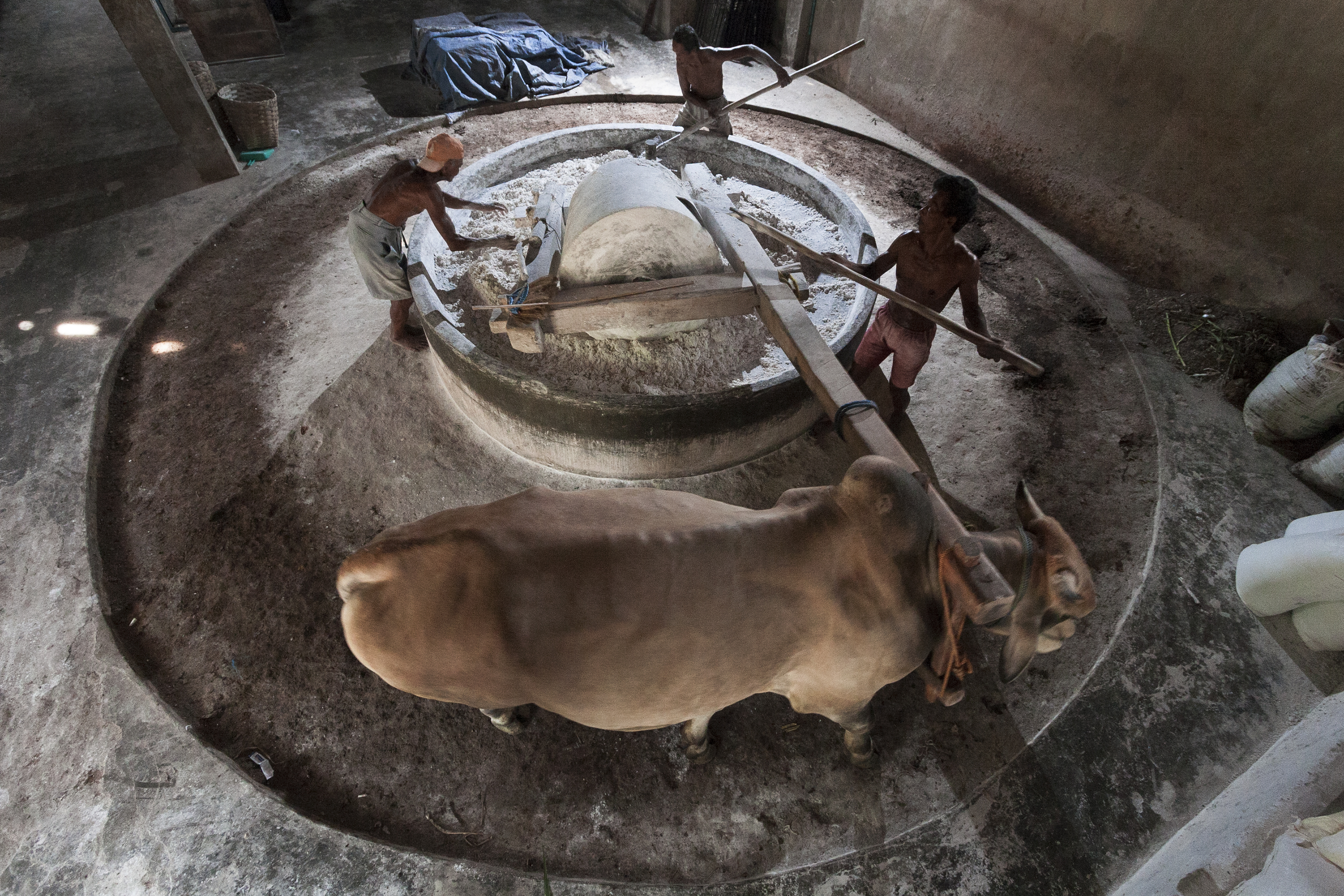
A bull is used to process the flour

The main ingredients of mie lethek are grated cassava and tapioca. The cassava is soaked in water for several days. Each day, the water must be changed. After soaking, the cassava is ground using a large grinder and then mixed with tapioca. This mixture is kneaded using a bull for about two hours until thoroughly mixed. Once mixed, the dough is shaped into long rectangular blocks measuring 20 cm x 30 cm x 20 cm. These blocks are then steamed for 90 minutes and allowed to cool overnight. The cooled blocks are then grated, mixed with tapioca flour again, shaped into noodles, and dried.

== Modern and traditional tools ==
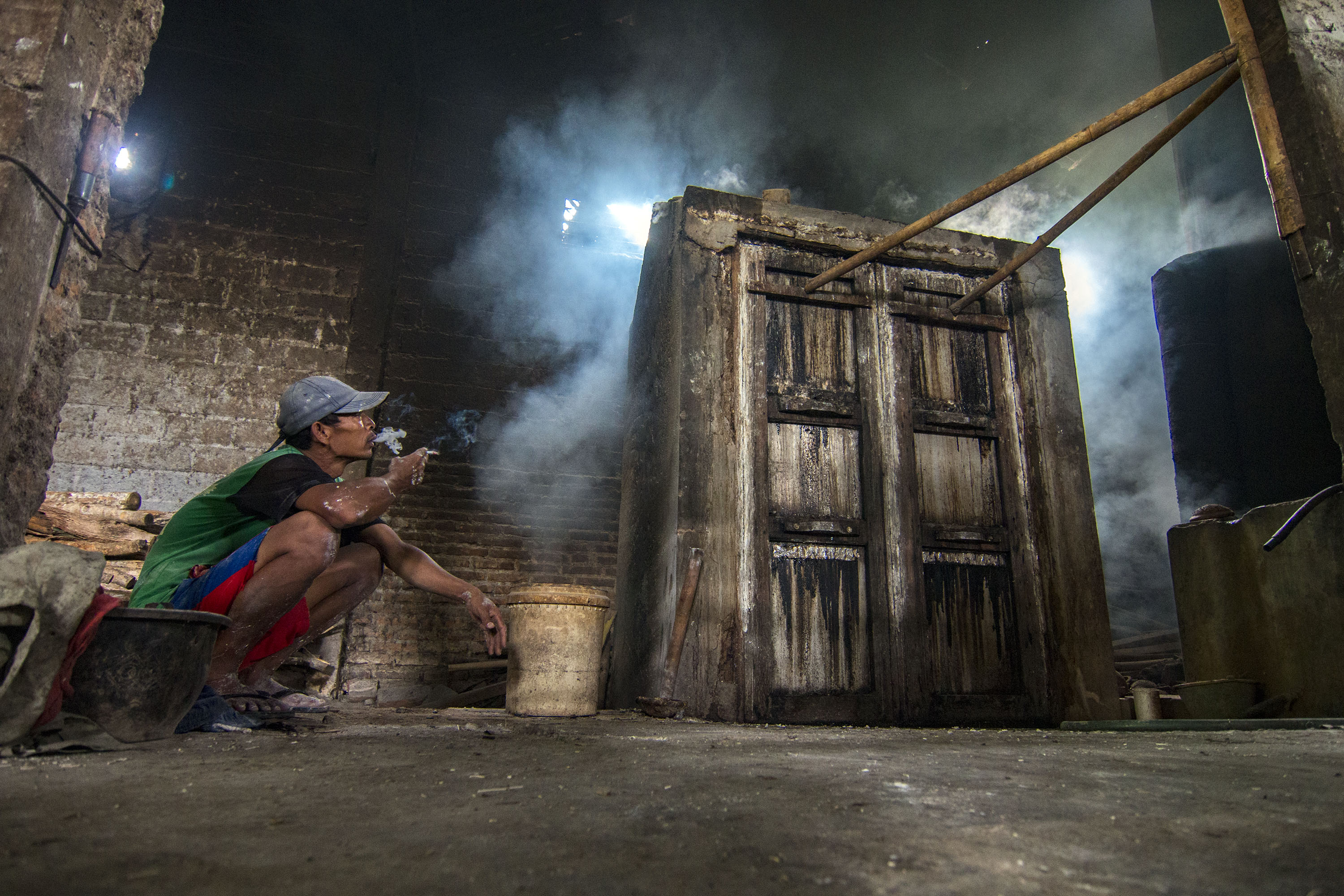
A worker in the noodle factory in Bantul, Yogyakarta, waiting for the steaming process before the noodles are pressed and molded.

The noodles are cut using both modern and traditional tools. Traditional tools include a large circular cutter with eight blades, which are operated by several people. The cutter is placed over a mortar or basin with a sieve to catch the cut noodles. Once cut, the noodles are spread out and dried.

The mie lethek factory in Bendho Village, Trimurti Subdistrict, Srandakan, sells its products in markets such as Bantul Market, Beringharjo Market, and even as far as Jawi Kilèn. However, the noodles are not sold in Jawi Wétan due to competition from other producers.

== Preparation ==
Mie lethek can be prepared by frying or boiling the noodles. They are typically seasoned with a mixture of spices such as garlic, shallots, chili, candlenuts, turmeric, and galangal, along with chicken meat and various vegetables.
