= Mexican rice =

Tomato rice dish

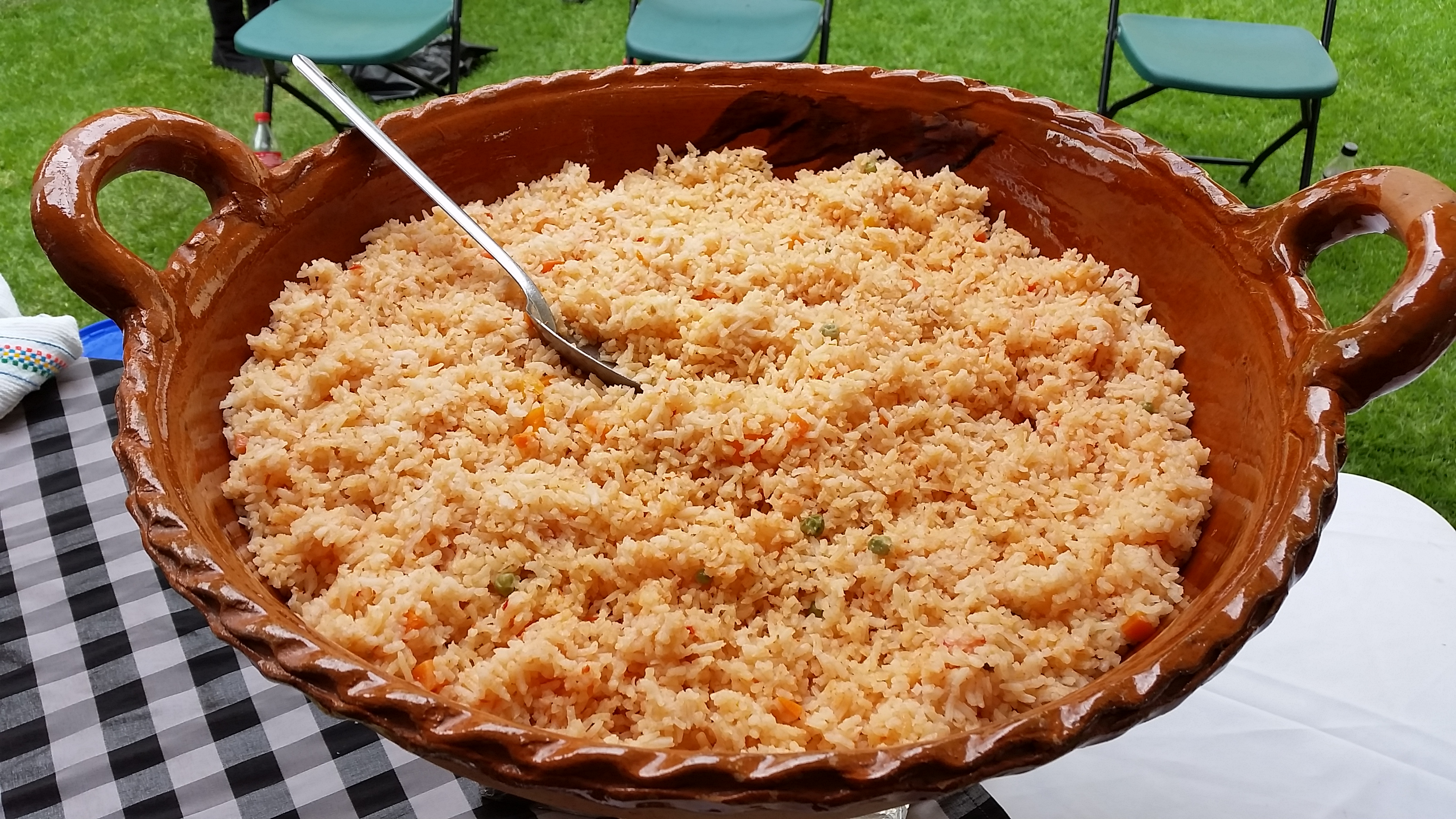
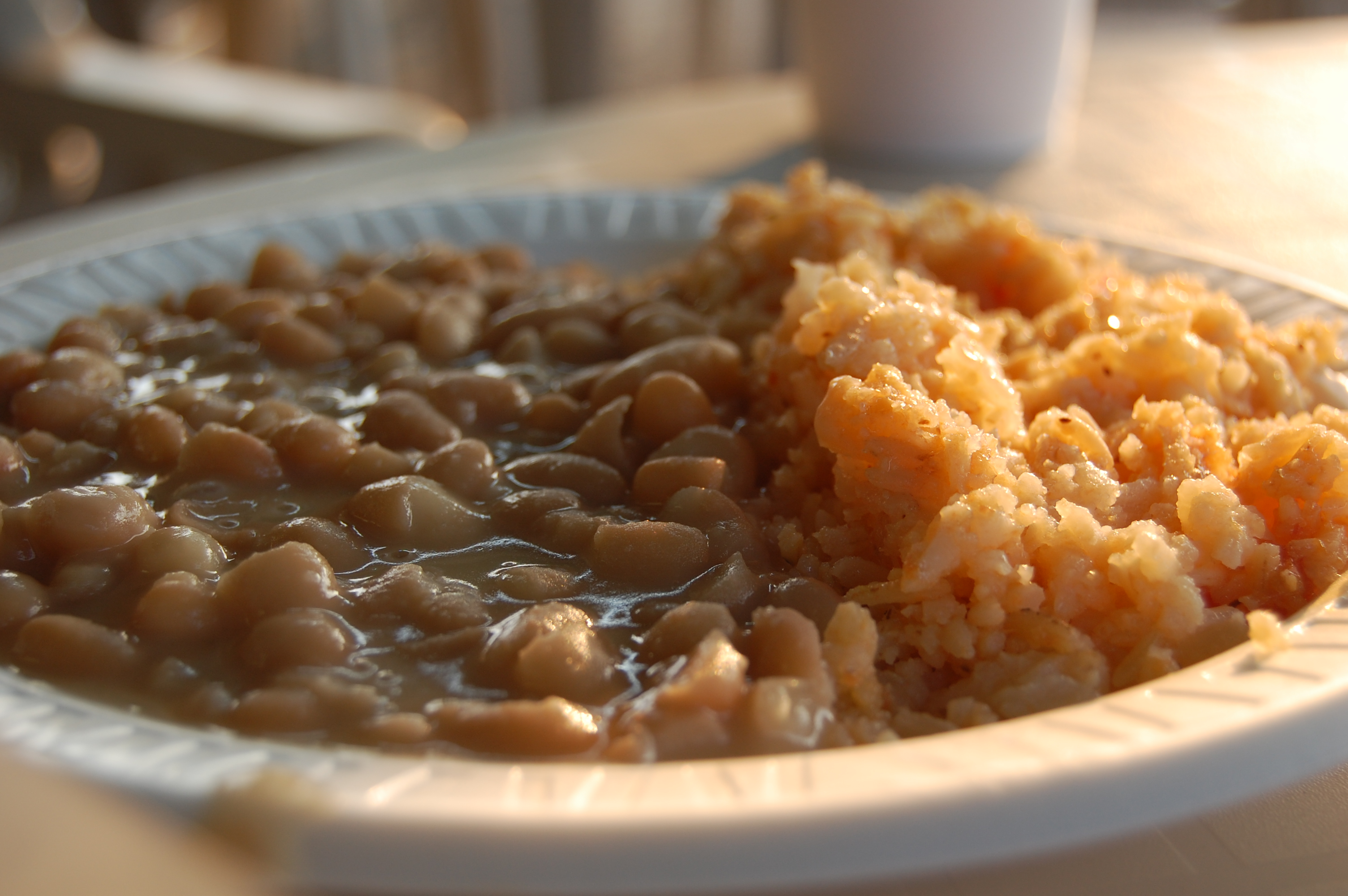
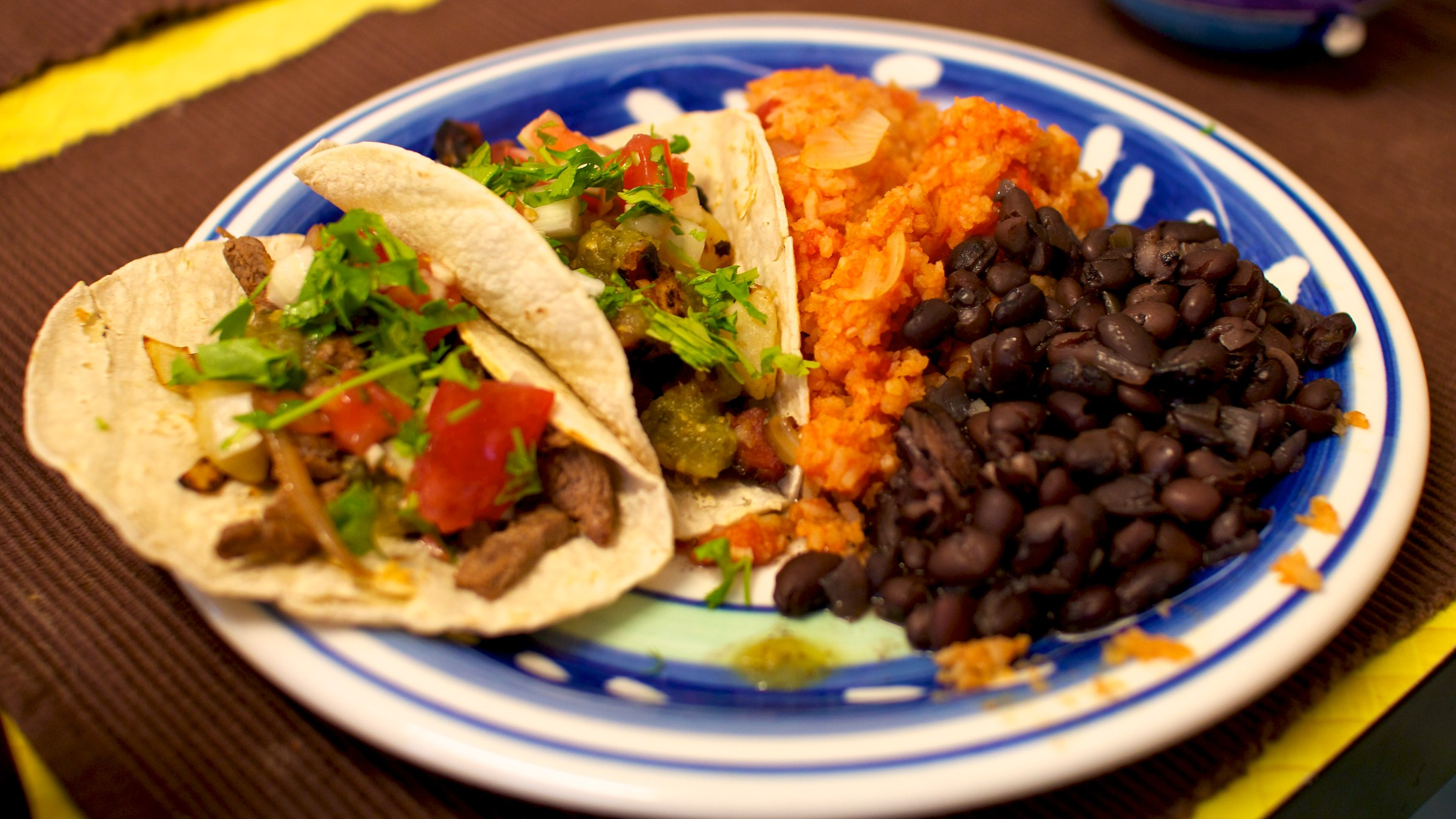
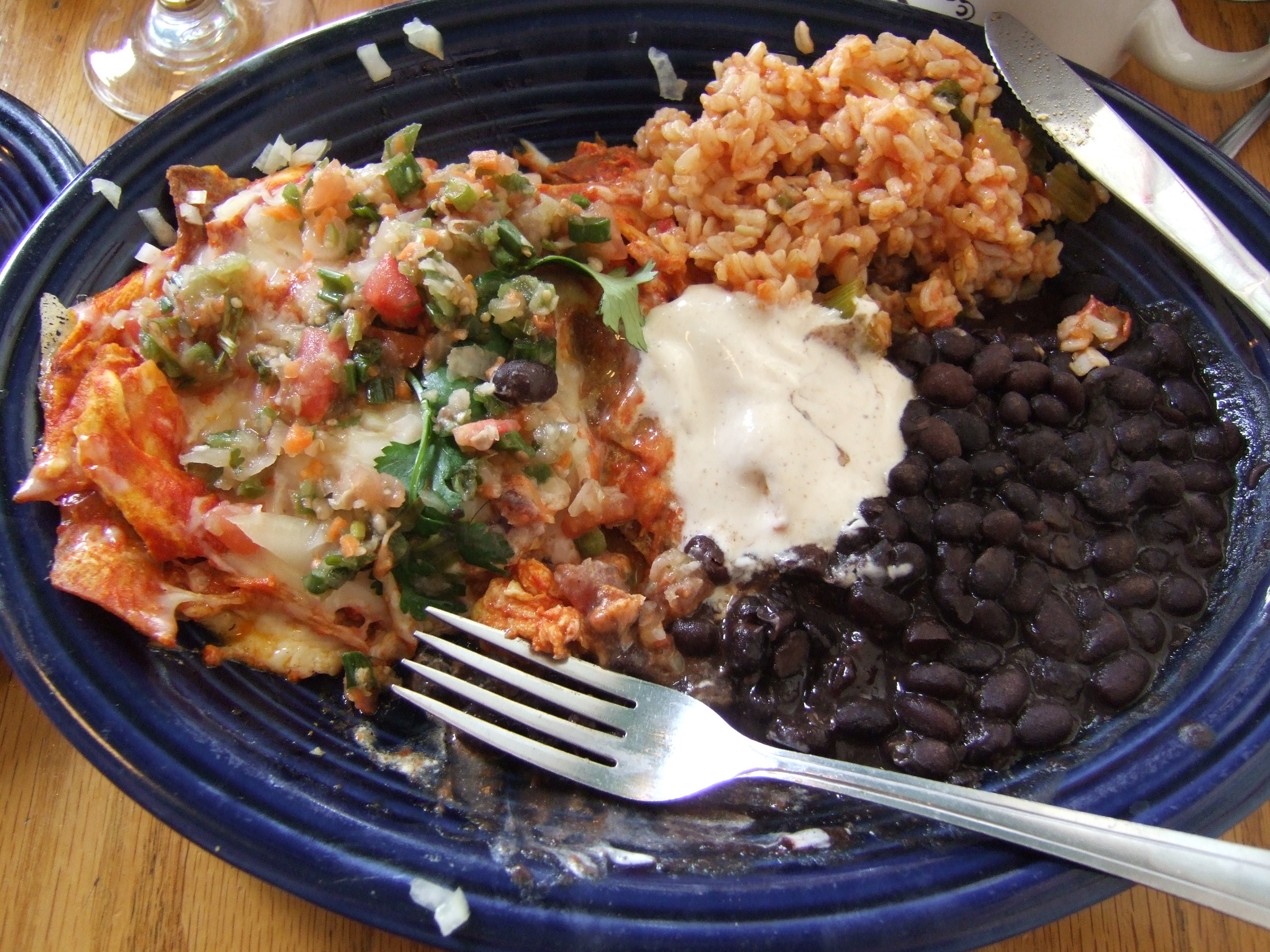
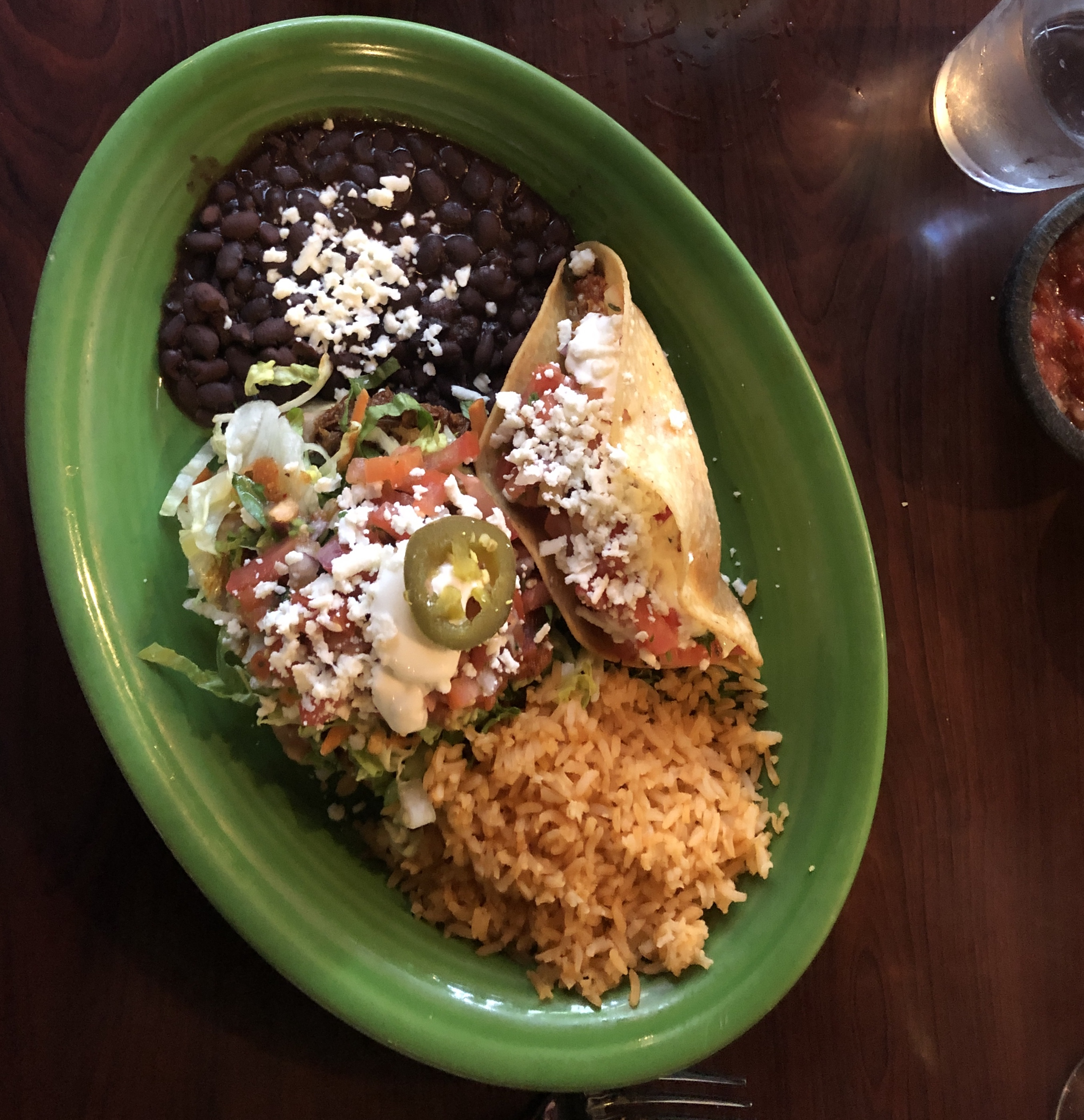
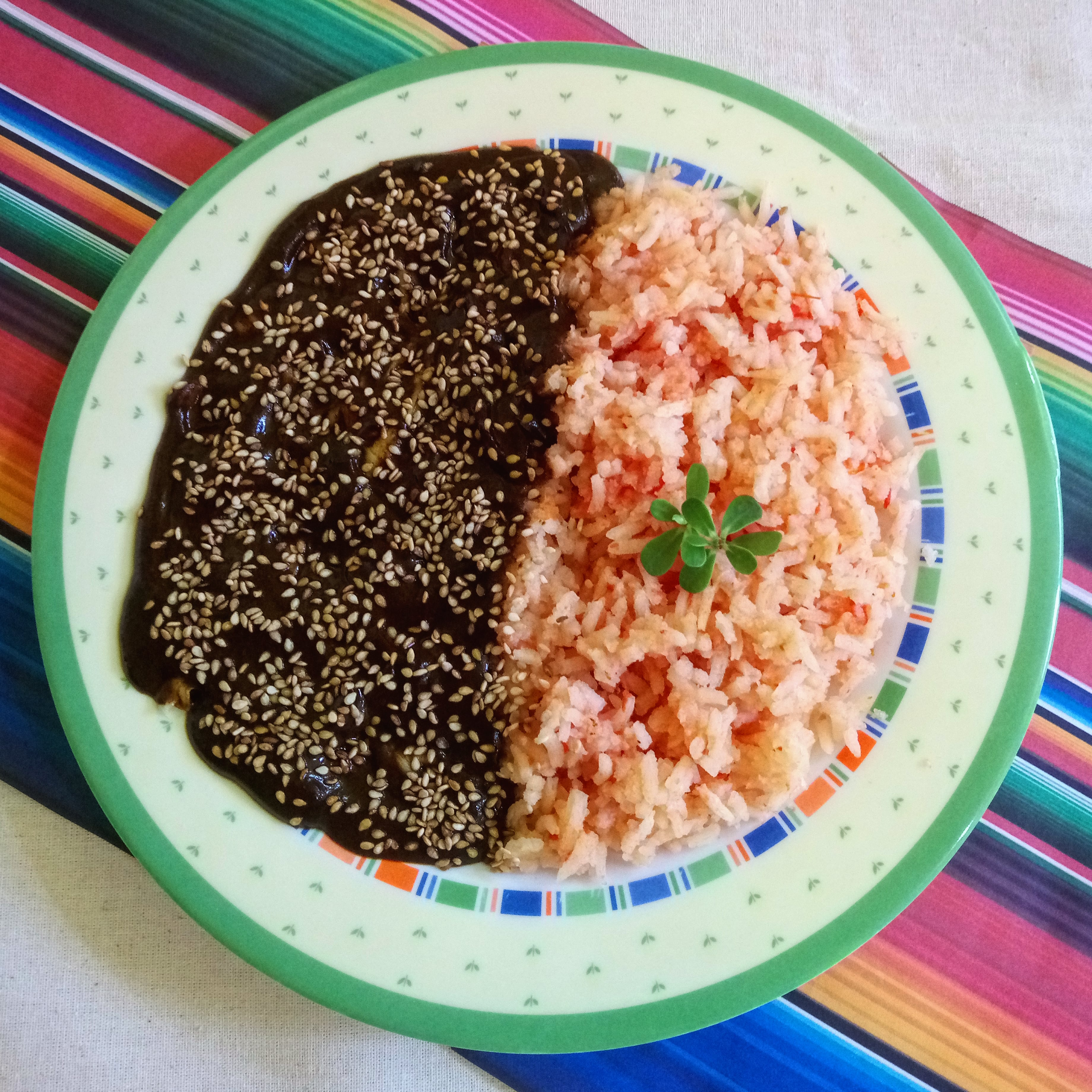
- Alternative names: Arroz a la Mexicana; Arroz Mexicano; Arroz rojo Sopa de arroz Red rice Spanish rice
- Course: Side dish
- Place of origin: Mexico
- Serving temperature: Hot
- Main ingredients: White rice, tomatoes, garlic, onions, broth

Mexican rice (sometimes referred to as Spanish rice or red rice in Tex–Mex cuisine), also known as arroz a la mexicana, arroz mexicano, sopa de arroz, or arroz rojo in Spanish, is a Mexican side dish made primarily with white rice, tomato, garlic, onion, and chicken broth. Mexican rice is almost always eaten as a complement to other dishes such as mole, refried beans, rotisserie chicken, carne asada, picadillo, tacos, fried fish, fried chicken, chiles rellenos, or vegetable soup.

Mexican-style rice is especially popular in central and northern Mexico and the southwestern United States. It is eaten year-round and is one of the most common preparations in Mexican cuisine.

== History ==
Rice was introduced to Mexico by the Spanish as early as the 16th century.

A dish of rice cooked with tomato first became widely consumed in the US during the late 1800s, but not under the name Spanish rice. Those that were known under that name did not necessarily resemble the modern dish: one such recipe under the name "Spanish" rice, published in Sarah Tyson Rorer's 1902 New Cook Book resembled a chicken paella. A year later, a preparation close to the modern form was published in Mary Virginia Terhune's Complete Cook Book, though this was finished by topping with breadcrumbs and baking. In the 1920s, at a time when foods associated with Mexico were becoming popular for their perceived exoticism, Mexican rice became established in the American diet. Valued as a more accessible option when more spicy dishes were considered overwhelming, it remained popular into the 1960s when its popularity declined.

== Preparation ==
Mexican rice is prepared by rinsing and briefly soaking medium-grained white rice and then toasting the rice in a heavy saucepan with fat, such as lard or cooking oil. After the grains of rice start to turn golden and translucent, tomato, onion, and garlic are all blended in either chicken broth, vegetable stock or a solution of water and chicken soup flavoring to make a sauce which is added to the toasted rice grains, where the mixture is brought to a simmer and briefly stirred and covered for 15–20 minutes, until the rice absorbs all of the liquid and becomes soft.

If the Mexican rice includes chopped vegetables such as carrot, corn, or pea, the vegetables are usually added while the rice is being toasted in the oil, before adding tomato sauce or broth, to get them soft and cooked well, and they can be seasoned with salt, finely chopped coriander, and/or ground cumin. In terms of spices and herbs, cumin, oregano, cayenne, and chili powder can be added to the tomato sauce blend. Cilantro may also be added to the tomato sauce or used fresh as a garnish.

== Naming and etymology ==
The dish is most commonly referred to as arroz rojo in Mexico (and the direct translation "red rice" is sometimes used in English).

The term "Spanish rice" is sometimes used in the context of Tex-Mex cuisine, but is not used by Mexicans or Spaniards since this recipe is not part of Spanish cuisine, although it can be considered a simplified version of Spain's paella valenciana (with tomato rather than saffron, turmeric, or calendula, and thus having a red rather than yellow color). It has been theorized that the name "Spanish rice" was given because Mexicans speak Spanish and make this rice dish, thus causing the language of the country to be incorporated into the name.

Other names associated with this dish are "arroz mexicano" (Mexican rice) and "arroz a la mexicana" (Mexican-style rice).

== See also ==
- Jambalaya
- Java rice
- Jollof rice
- Paella
- Pilaf
- Fried rice
- Rice and beans
- Rice and peas
