= Seyyedan =

City in Fars province, Iran

Seyyedan Persian: سيدان
- City
- Location within Iran
- Coordinates: 30°00′07″N 53°00′12″E
- Country: Iran
- Province: Fars
- County: Marvdasht
- District: Seyyedan

Population (2016)
  - Total: 8,574
- Time zone: UTC+3:30 (IRST)

Seyyedan (Persian: سيدان) (Note: Also romanized as Sa‘īdān, Seydān, and Seyyedān; also known as Saidūn) is a city in, and the capital of, Seyyedan District of Marvdasht County, Fars province, Iran. It also serves as the administrative center for Khafrak-e Olya Rural District.

== Demographics ==
=== Population ===
At the time of the 2006 National Census, the city's population was 7,555 in 1,954 households. The following census in 2011 counted 7,563 people in 2,170 households. The 2016 census measured the population of the city as 8,574 people in 2,566 households.
