= Hsi htamin =

Burmese oiled rice snack

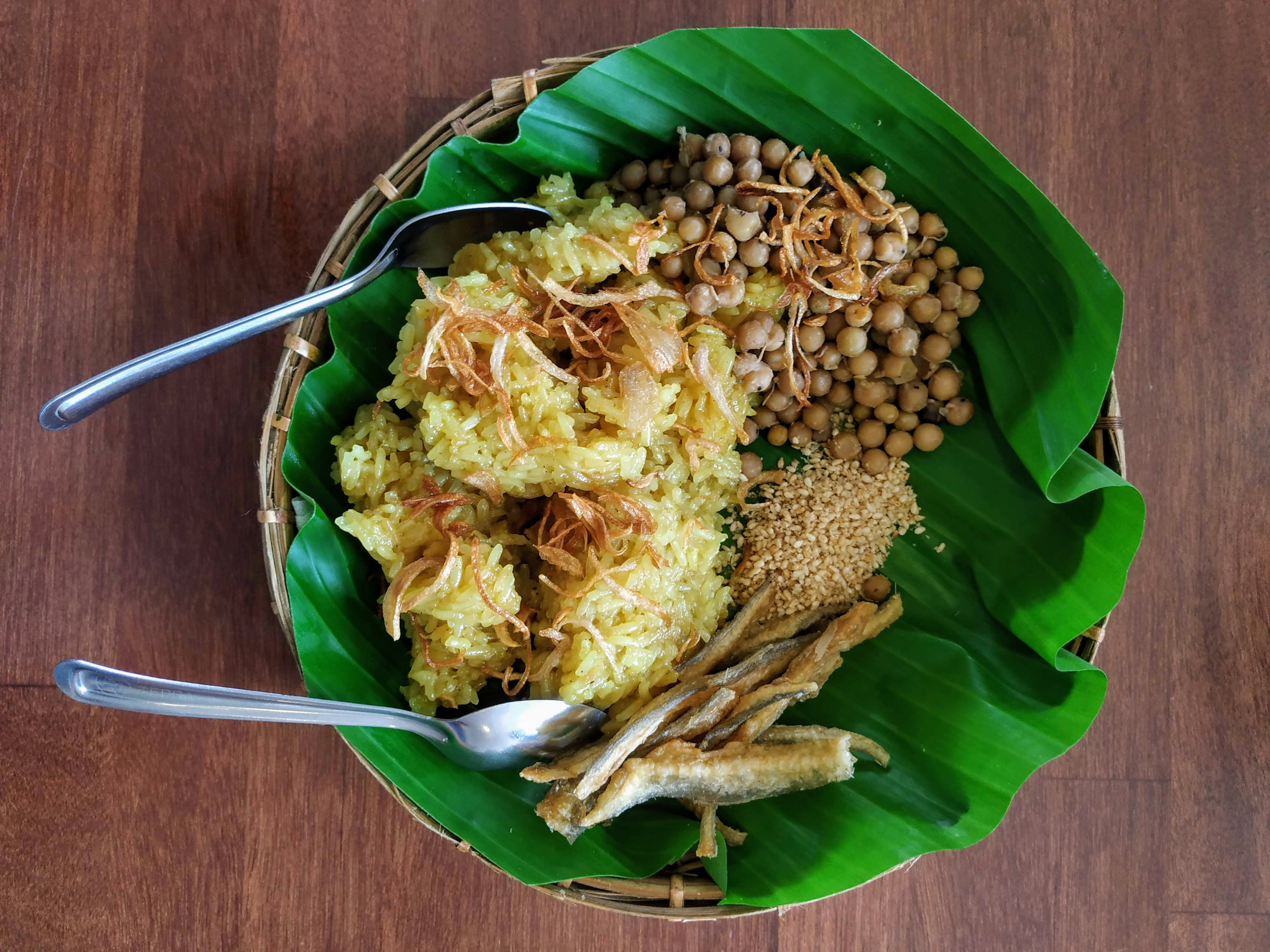
- Type: Snack (mont)
- Place of origin: Myanmar (Burma)
- Region or state: Southeast Asia
- Associated cuisine: Burmese
- Main ingredients: glutinous rice, peanut oil, onions, turmeric
- Similar dishes: Nasi kunyit

Hsi htamin (Burmese: ဆီထမင်း, pronounced [sʰì tʰəmɪ́ɴ], lit. 'oiled rice'; also spelt si htamin) is a traditional Burmese snack or mont, popularly served as a breakfast dish, often served alongside peas or dried fish.

The dish consists of glutinous rice cooked with turmeric, salt, and onions, and served with roasted sesame seeds and fried onions, which renders a golden hue to the rice.
