= Faruq, Iran =

City in Fars province, Iran

Faruq Persian: فاروق
- City
- Location within Iran
- Coordinates: 29°57′44″N 53°02′44″E
- Country: Iran
- Province: Fars
- County: Marvdasht
- District: Seyyedan

Population (2016)
  - Total: 5,860
- Time zone: UTC+3:30 (IRST)

Faruq (Persian: فاروق) (Note: Also romanized as Fārūq; also known as Pārū) is a city in Seyyedan District of Marvdasht County, Fars province, Iran.

== Demographics ==
=== Population ===
At the time of the 2006 National Census, Faruq's population was 5,227 in 1,361 households, when it was a village in Khafrak-e Olya Rural District. The following census in 2011 counted 4,926 people in 1,434 households. The 2016 census measured the population of the village as 5,860 people in 1,784 households. It was the most populous village in its rural district.

After the census, Faruq was elevated to the status of a city.
