= Nasi kuning =

Indonesian rice dish

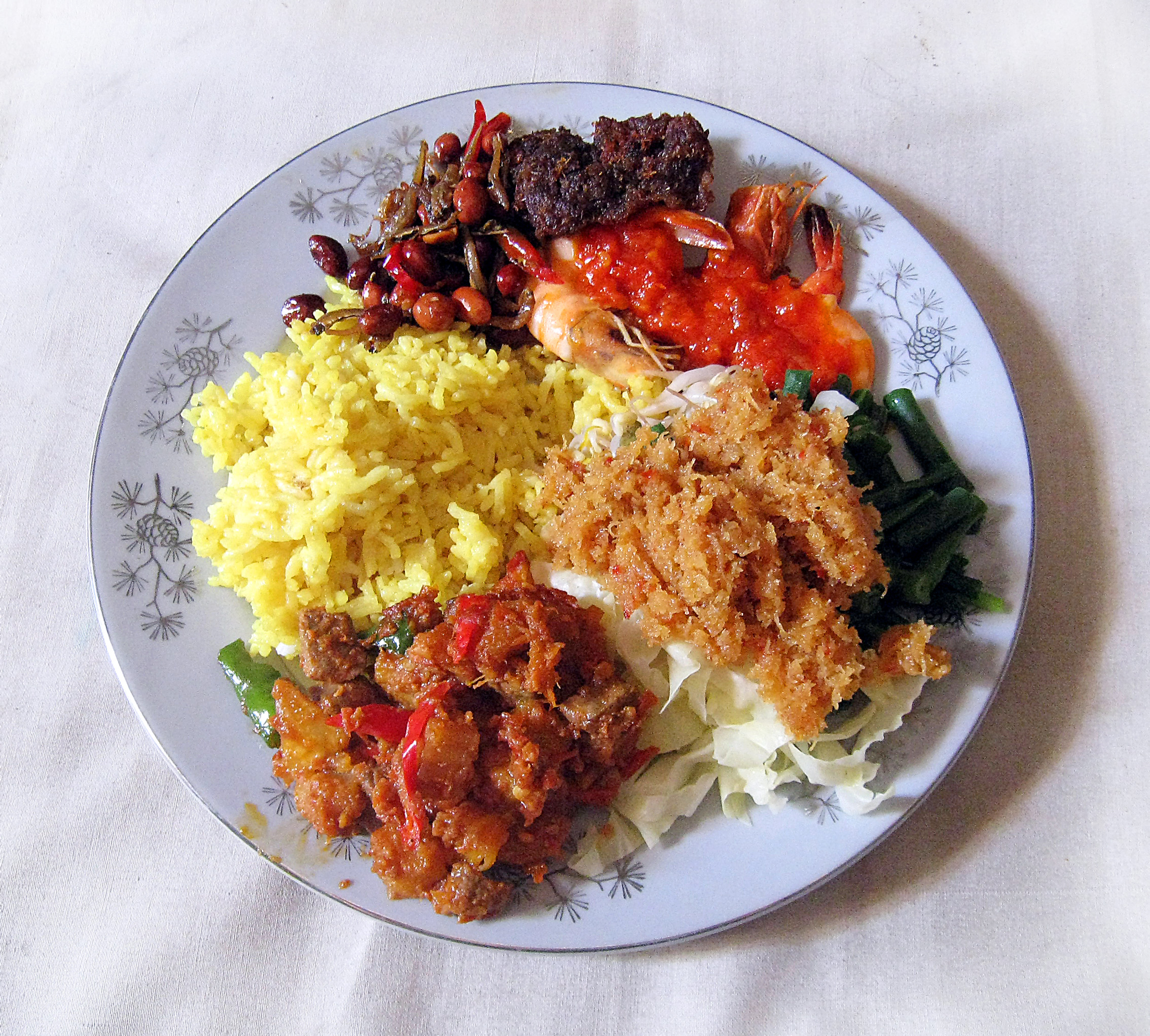
- Nasi kuning personal serving, surrounded with rich Indonesian dishes
- Alternative names: Nasi kunyit
- Course: Main course
- Place of origin: Java, Indonesia
- Region or state: Sumatra, Malay Peninsula, Java, Borneo, Sulawesi, Maluku, Mindanao
- Associated cuisine: Indonesia, Malaysia, Brunei, Singapore, the Netherlands, the Philippines, Suriname, Sri Lanka (known as kaha buth) and South Africa
- Serving temperature: Hot and room temperature
- Main ingredients: Rice cooked in turmeric surrounded with side dishes
- Similar dishes: Hsi htamin

Nasi kuning (literally, "yellow rice"; Indonesian pronunciation: [ˌnasi ˈkunɪŋ]), sometimes called nasi kunyit (literally, "turmeric rice"; Indonesian pronunciation: [ˌnasi ˈkuɲɪt̪̚]), is an Indonesian fragrant rice dish cooked with coconut milk and turmeric, hence the name nasi kuning (yellow rice). Nasi kuning also can be found in neighbouring Malaysia, Brunei, Singapore and Cocos Island, Australia.

Because of its perceived favourable fortune and auspicious meaning, nasi kuning is often served as a special dish for celebrations; e.g. community rituals, ceremonies, birthdays, weddings, anniversaries and also the independence day celebration. Nevertheless, it is also a favourite dish for breakfast in Indonesia.

In the Philippines, a related dish exists in Mindanao, particularly among the Maranao people, where it is known as kuning. Like the Indonesian version, it primarily uses turmeric, but also adds lemongrass and does not use coconut milk. A similar dish is also found in Sri Lankan cuisine where it is known as kaha buth (and lamprais) and draws from both Indonesian and Sri Lankan influences.

== History and origin ==
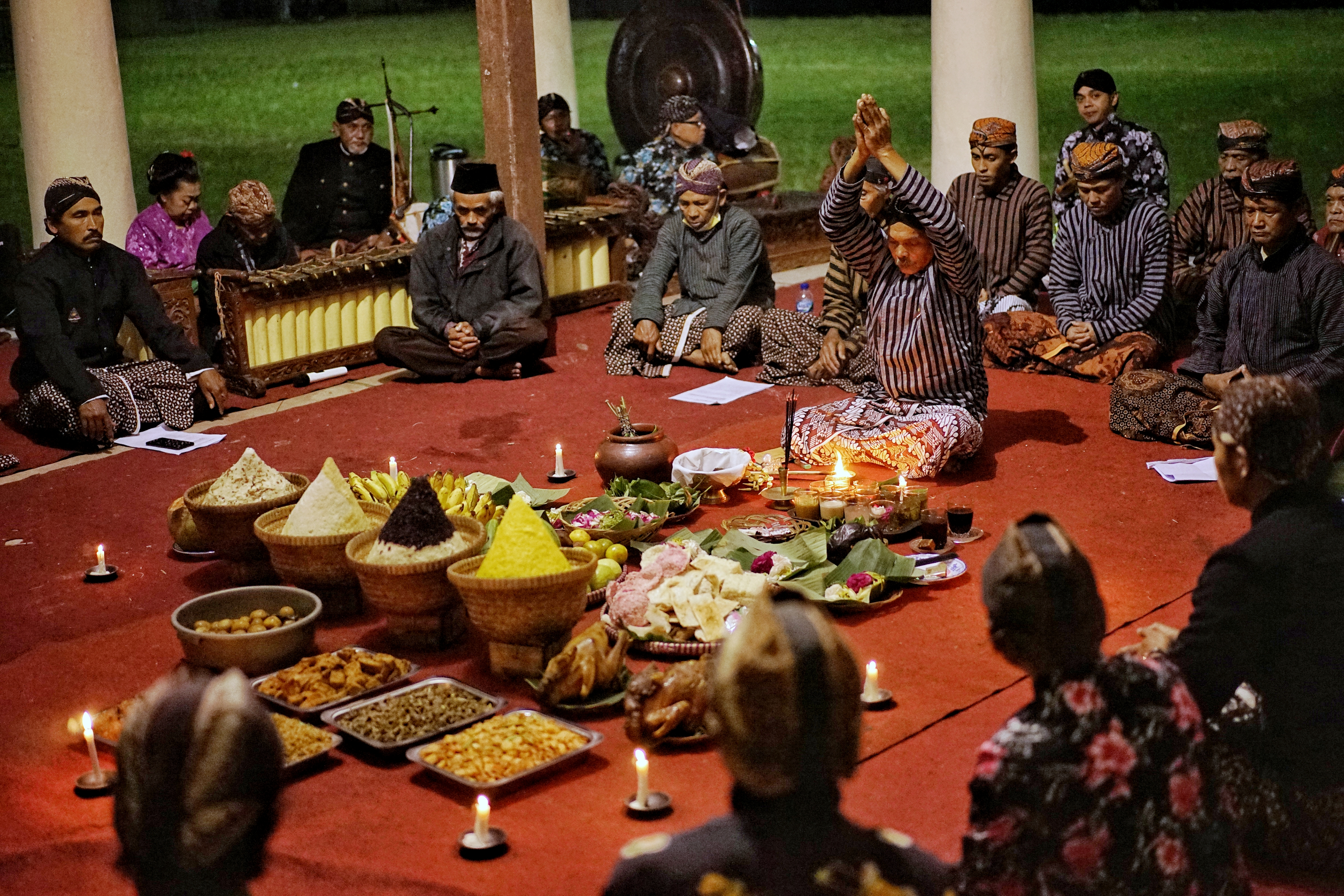
Javanese Kejawen community performing Birat Sengkolo ritual with offerings including cone-shaped tumpeng nasi kuning

The origin of nasi kuning can be traced to the culinary legacy of ancient Java and Bali. The earliest record of nasi kuning came from Majapahit period in Java circa the 13th century. Nasi kuning was first served as a special dish in religious events, traditional ceremonies or weddings for Javanese nobles. This food was originally only served at certain times for nobles, high-status and distinguished people.

In Javanese tradition, the colour yellow symbolises wealth and prosperity, because of its association with gold pieces as a symbol of wealth, and also the colour of ripe rice ready to be harvested, all of which are symbols of prosperity. Slightly different in predominantly Hindu island of Bali, the colour yellow symbolised a sacred aspect of Mahadewa. Therefore, yellow is very commonly used as the dominant colour in the Kuningan Day celebrations of the Hindu-Balinese community.

Nasi kuning is mentioned in early 19th century Javanese literature Serat Centhini as sega punar or sega wuduk punar. It is a variant of sega wuduk or rice cooked in coconut milk, but with the addition of turmeric which creates yellowish colour, thus the name punar is synonym with kuning in Javanese which means "yellow".

In Javanese tradition, nasi kuning is often served as a form of gratitude and prayer for blessings. Nasi kuning is a means of praying that the family or community will be given health, prosperity and blessings in their lives. Nasi kuning as cone-shaped tumpeng is essential in Javanese selamatan rituals, especially among traditional Kejawen community as offerings or consumed as communal meals.

== Cultural significance ==
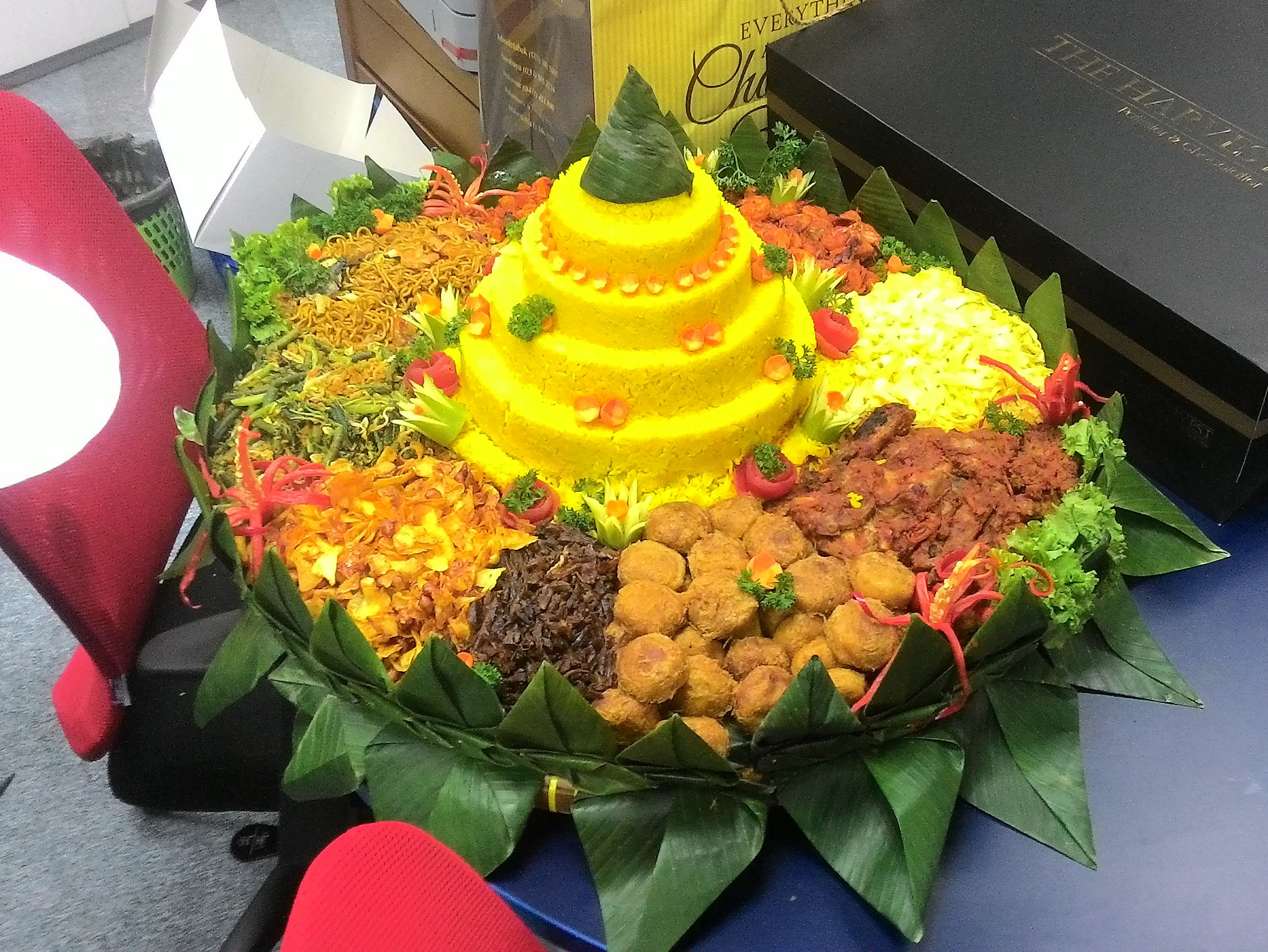
Nasi kuning in its tumpeng form, essential in Javanese ceremony.

Nasi kuning is often described as "Indonesian yellow rice", although it is also served in neighbouring countries, e.g. in Malaysia as nasi kunyit and in the Philippines as kuning. This yellow rice dish holds a special cultural significance in some cultures in the region, considered as an auspicious food item essential for ceremonies, rituals and celebrations.

In Indonesian culture, nasi kuning has favourable symbolic meanings. The yellow-coloured rice is perceived to look like a pile of gold, so it is often served on festive occasions, including parties, housewarmings, welcoming guests, and opening ceremonies, as a symbol of good fortune, prosperity, wealth, and dignity.

Nasi kuning is quite widespread and commonly found in Indonesian culture. It can be found from Java to Sumatra, Bali, Kalimantan and Sulawesi. However, it is most strongly associated with Javanese culture, and to some extent, Minahasa traditions. In Java, nasi kuning might come in the form of a cone called a tumpeng and is usually eaten during special events. The top of the tumpeng is customarily given to the most senior person in attendance. One of the most popular nasi kuning variants comes from Manado in North Sulawesi, which employs cakalang (skipjack tuna).

In addition to its prominent role in Indonesian culinary traditions, nasi kuning also holds considerable ceremonial and cultural significance in Malaysia, Brunei and Singapore, particularly among the Malay community. In these regions, a variation of the dish known as pulut kuning is commonly prepared using glutinous rice. Pulut kuning is traditionally featured in religious ceremonies, festive occasions and social gatherings, regarded as a symbol of prosperity, good fortune and spiritual well-being. The dish exhibits regional diversity across Malaysia, particularly in areas such as Sabah and Terengganu, where it is commonly consumed as a breakfast dish, although it is typically prepared without glutinous rice in these regions.

In the Malaysian and Singaporean Peranakan (Straits Chinese) populations, nasi kuning is more commonly known as nasi kunyit. Like its Malay counterpart, it is also prepared using glutinous rice. The dish holds significant cultural value, particularly in the context of the full moon celebration, a traditional ritual marking the completion of a baby's first month. While nasi kunyit is deeply embedded in Peranakan cultural practices, it has been widely embraced by the broader ethnic Chinese population in Malaysia.

== Ingredients and serving ==
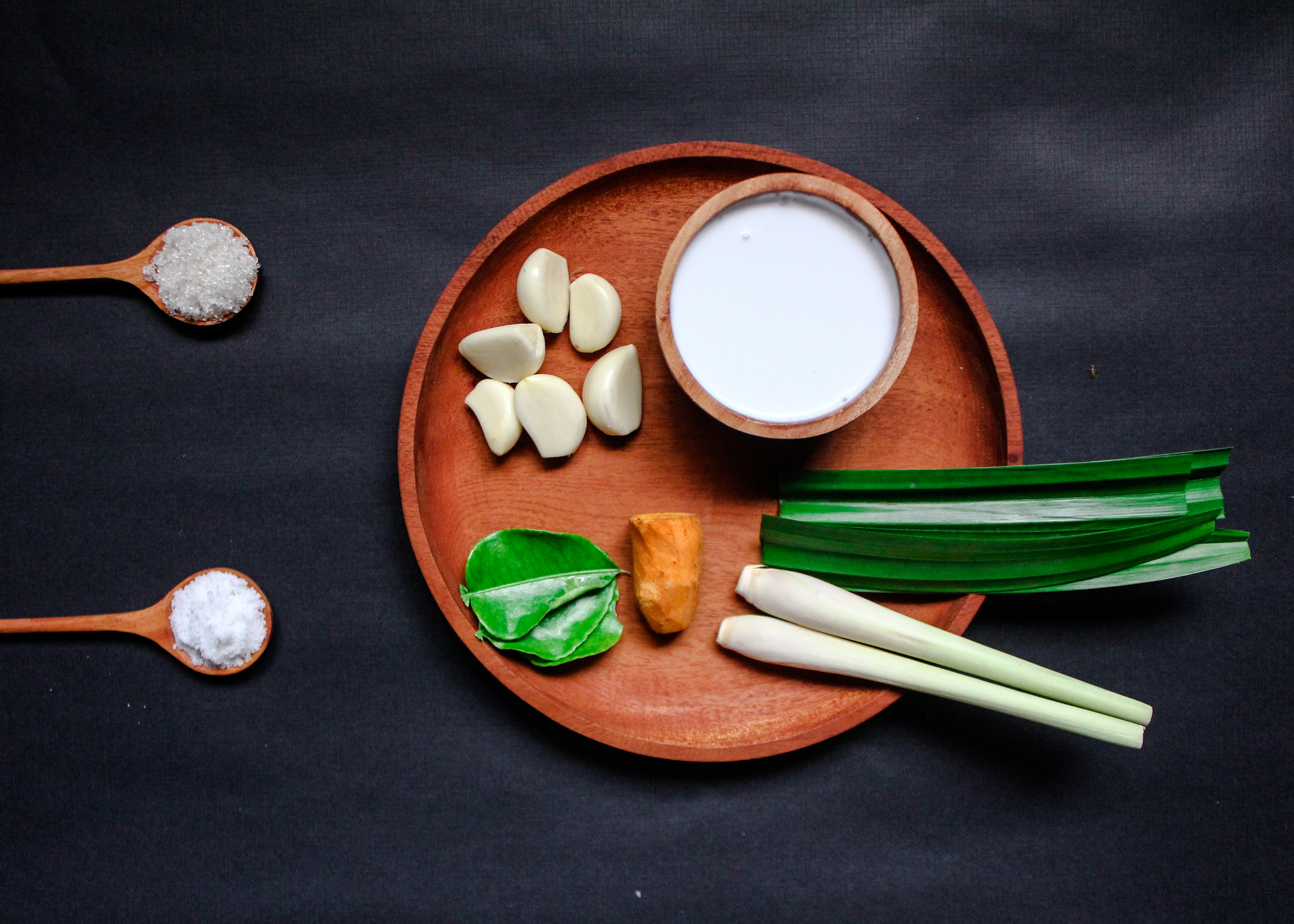
Nasi kuning bumbu ingredients including garlic, coconut milk, pandan leaf, lemongrass, turmeric, citrus leaf, sugar and salt

The addition of turmeric and coconut milk, sometimes also including pandan and lemongrass during the rice cooking and steaming process, has contributed to the tempting colour, pleasant fragrance, soft texture, and a flavourful taste of the yellow rice. Certain spices such as cinnamon, cardamom, cloves, and bay leaves, might be added to enhance this aromatic, fragrant rice dish.

Nasi kuning is usually served with a variety of side dishes such as shredded omelette, serundeng (relish of grated coconut and spices), urap (vegetable in shredded coconut dressing), teri kacang (fried anchovy and peanuts), sambal goreng (fried tempeh and potato caramelised in spicy sauce), ayam goreng (Javanese-style fried chicken), balado udang (shrimp in chilli), or perkedel (potato fritters). More complex nasi kuning could consist of fried cow's lung, empal (fried beef), and seafood. It is common to serve nasi kuning with kerupuk udang (shrimp cracker) or emping chips and a decoratively cut cucumber and tomato.

== Varieties ==
=== Indonesia ===
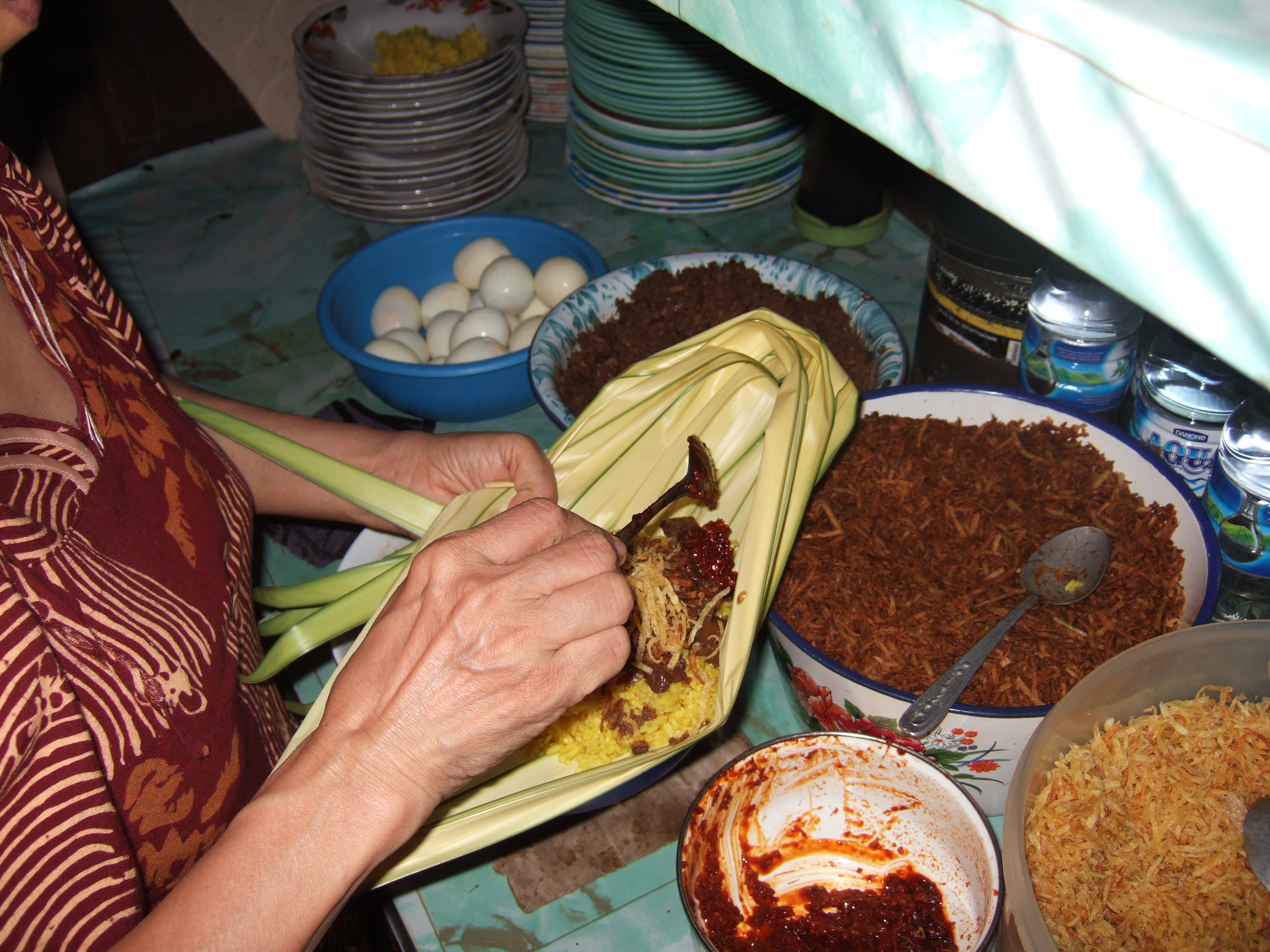
Preparing nasi kuning Manado in a woka leaf

There are various types of nasi kuning throughout Indonesia, with typical various side dishes in each region.

- Nasi kuning Ambon – with spicy skipjack tuna, spicy boiled egg, and stir-fried cellophane noodles locally called laksa Ambon.
- Nasi kuning Bali – with chicken betutu and sambal.
- Nasi kuning Banjar – with masak habang side dish including ikan haruan (Snakehead murrel).
- Nasi kuning Betawi – with balado egg, ayam goreng, perkedel, bawang goreng, kerupuk, cucumber, and sambal.
- Nasi kuning Gorontalo – with chicken broth soup.
- Nasi kuning Jawa – with orek tempe, perkedel, shredded omelette, and ayam goreng.
- Nasi kuning Makassar – with sayur labu siam (chayote soup).
- Nasi kuning Manado – with shredded skipjack tuna wrapped in woka (Saribus rotundifolius) leaf.
- Nasi kuning Sunda – with ayam goreng, balado egg, fried liver with sambal, bihun goreng and krupuk.

=== Malaysia ===
- Nasi kuning Sabah – with sambal ikan tongkol and kerisik.
- Nasi kuning Terengganu – with gulai ikan tongkol (mackerel tuna).
- Nasi kunyit Peranakan – with curry.

== Gallery ==
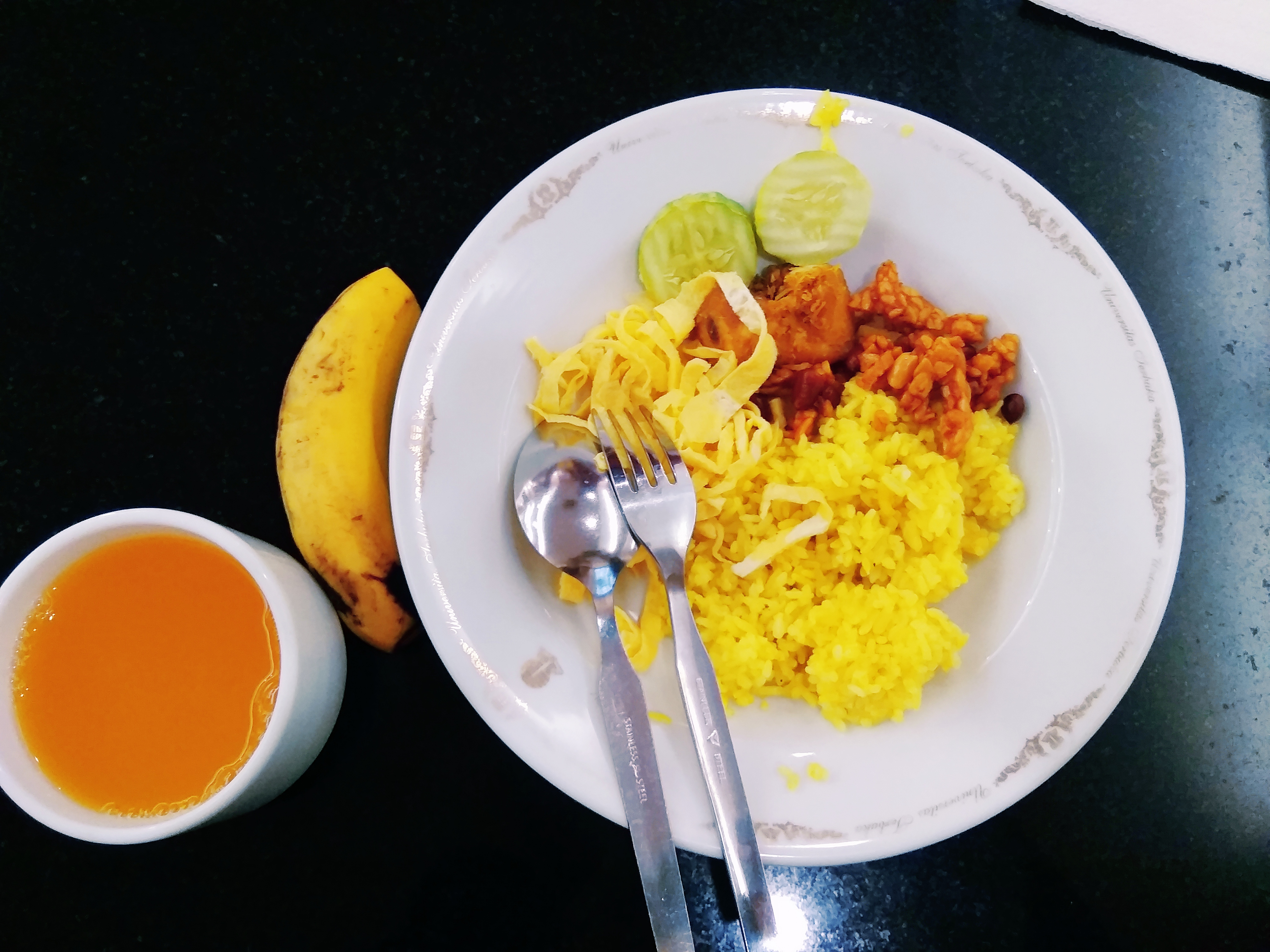
Nasi kuning for breakfast in Indonesia

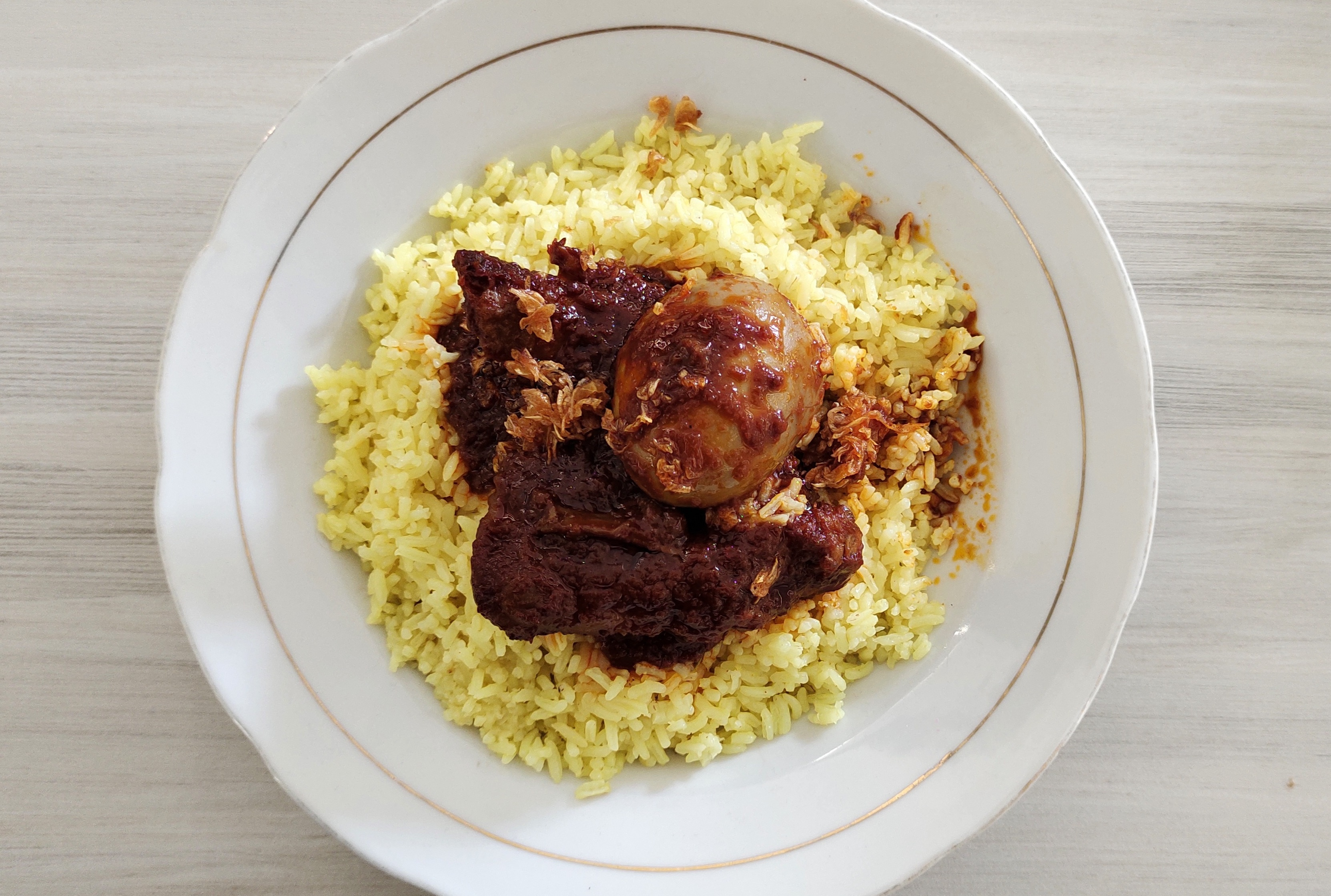
Nasi kuning Banjar

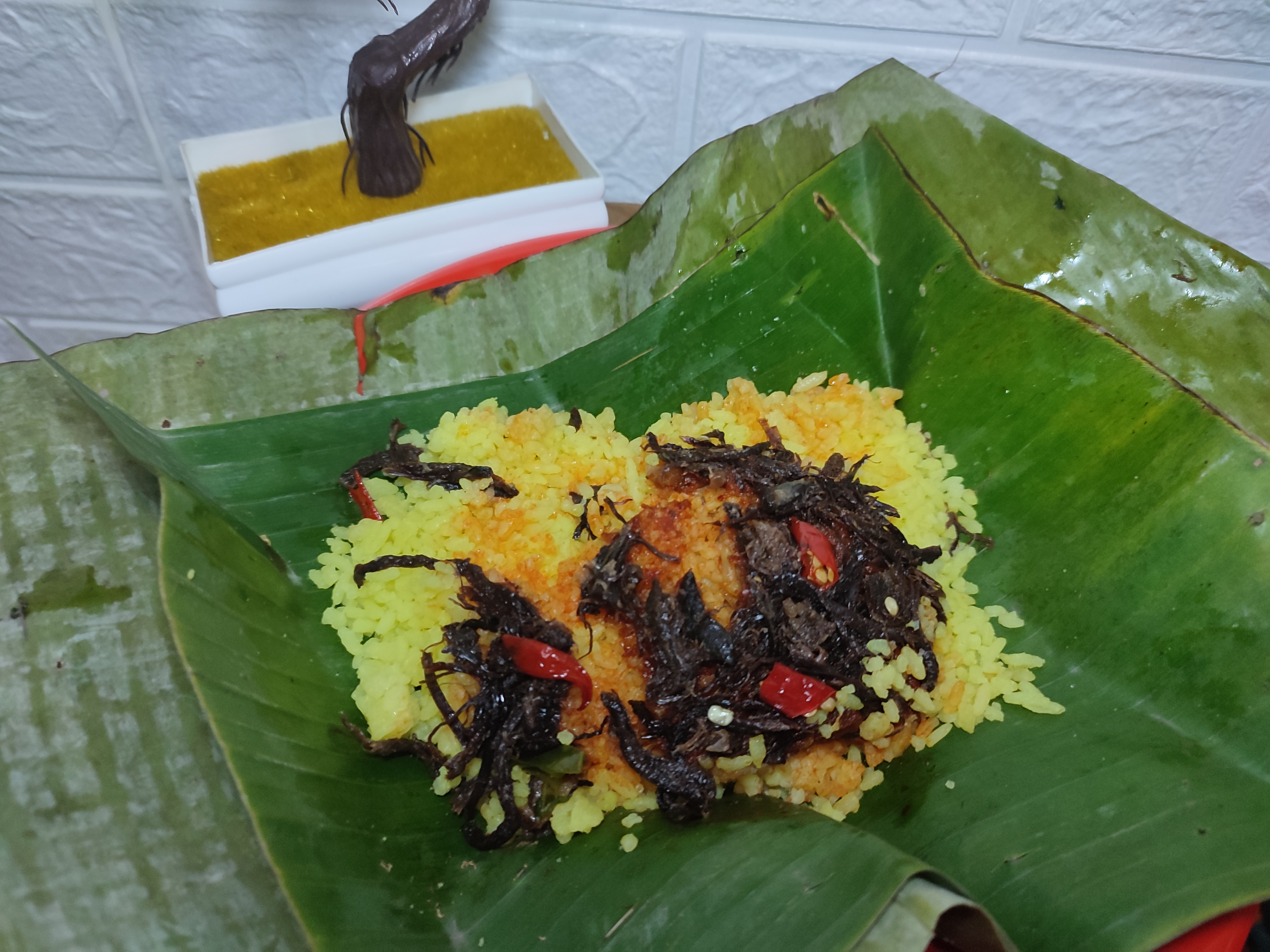
Nasi kuning with dendeng specialty of Banjarmasin

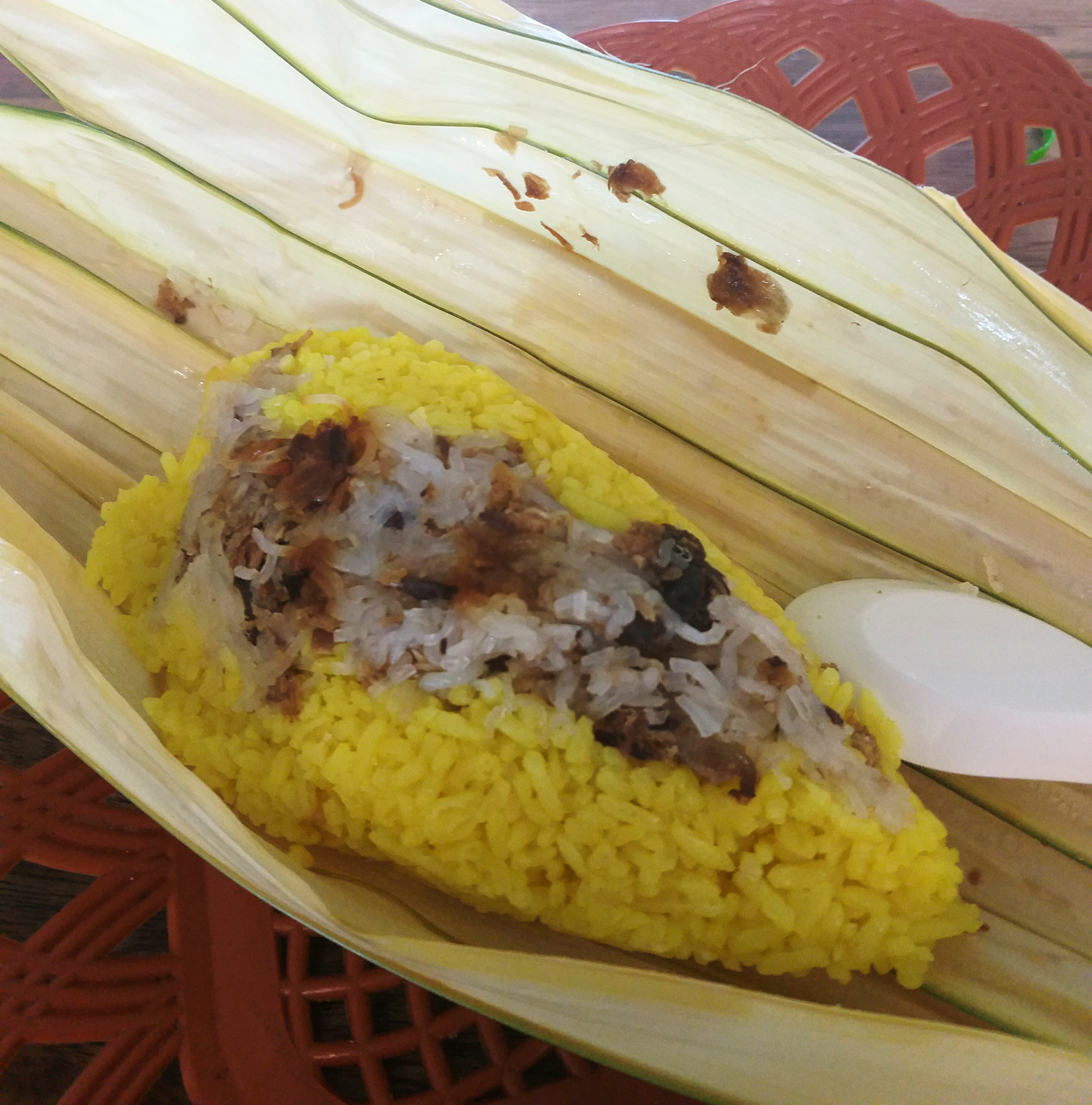
Manado nasi kuning wrapped in woka leaf

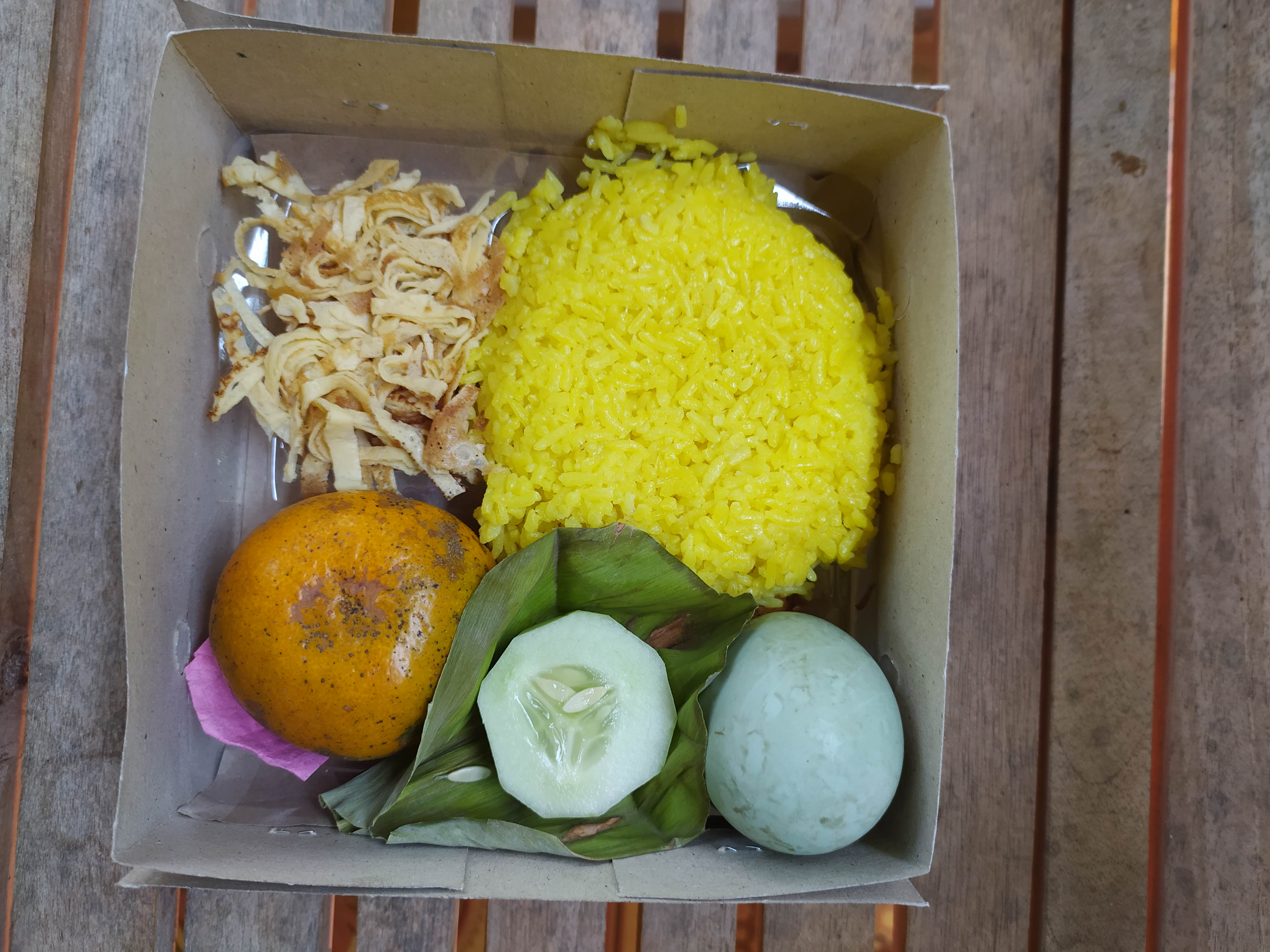
Nasi kuning kotak in paper box in Java

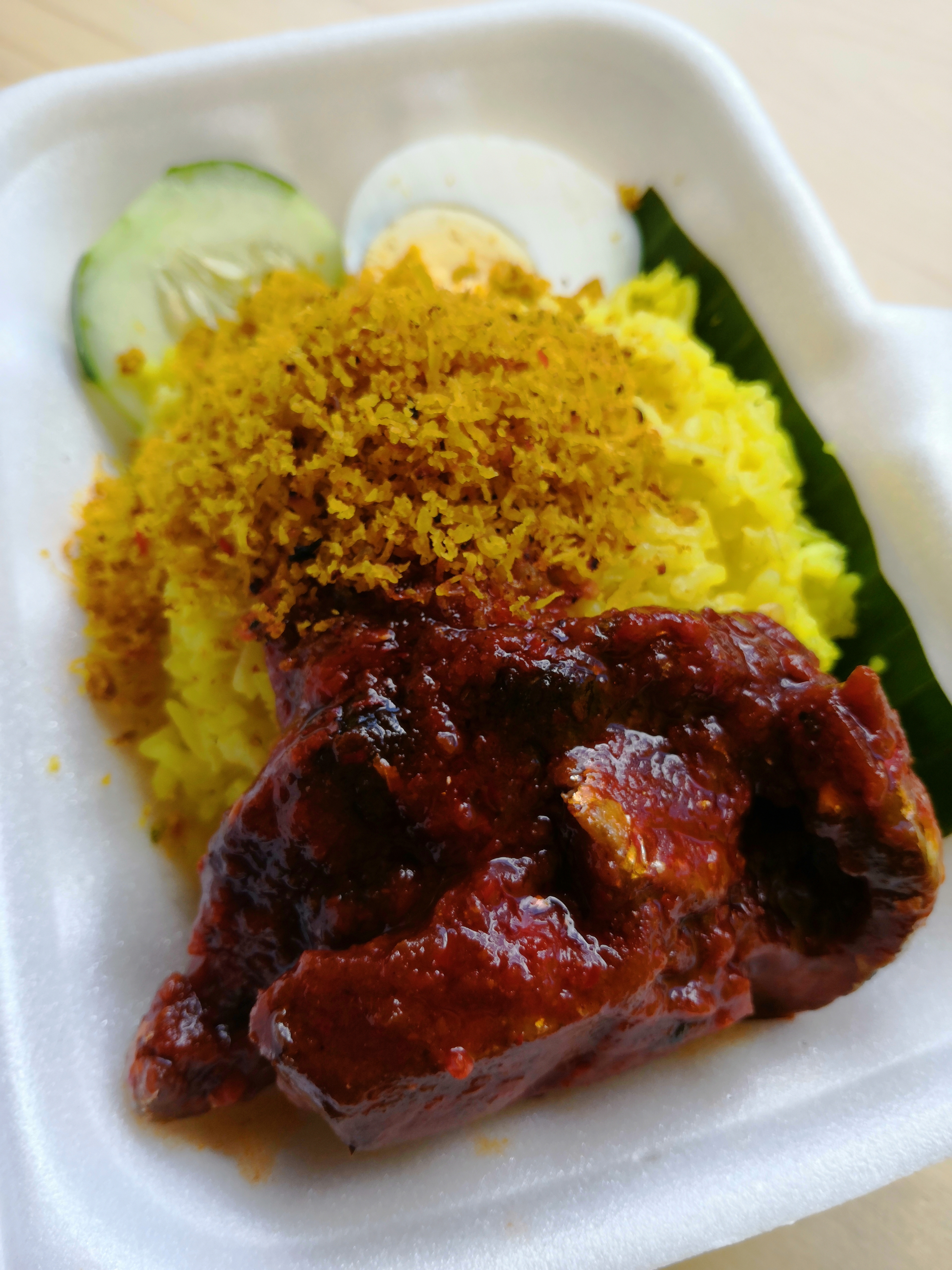
Nasi kuning served with fish and kerisik in Sabah

== See also ==
- List of rice dishes
- Java rice
- Nasi bogana
- Nasi campur
- Nasi goreng
- Nasi kucing
- Nasi lemak
- Nasi liwet
- Nasi pecel
- Nasi tim
- Nasi uduk
- Nasi ulam
- Sinigapuna
