= Cow lung =

Type of organ meat

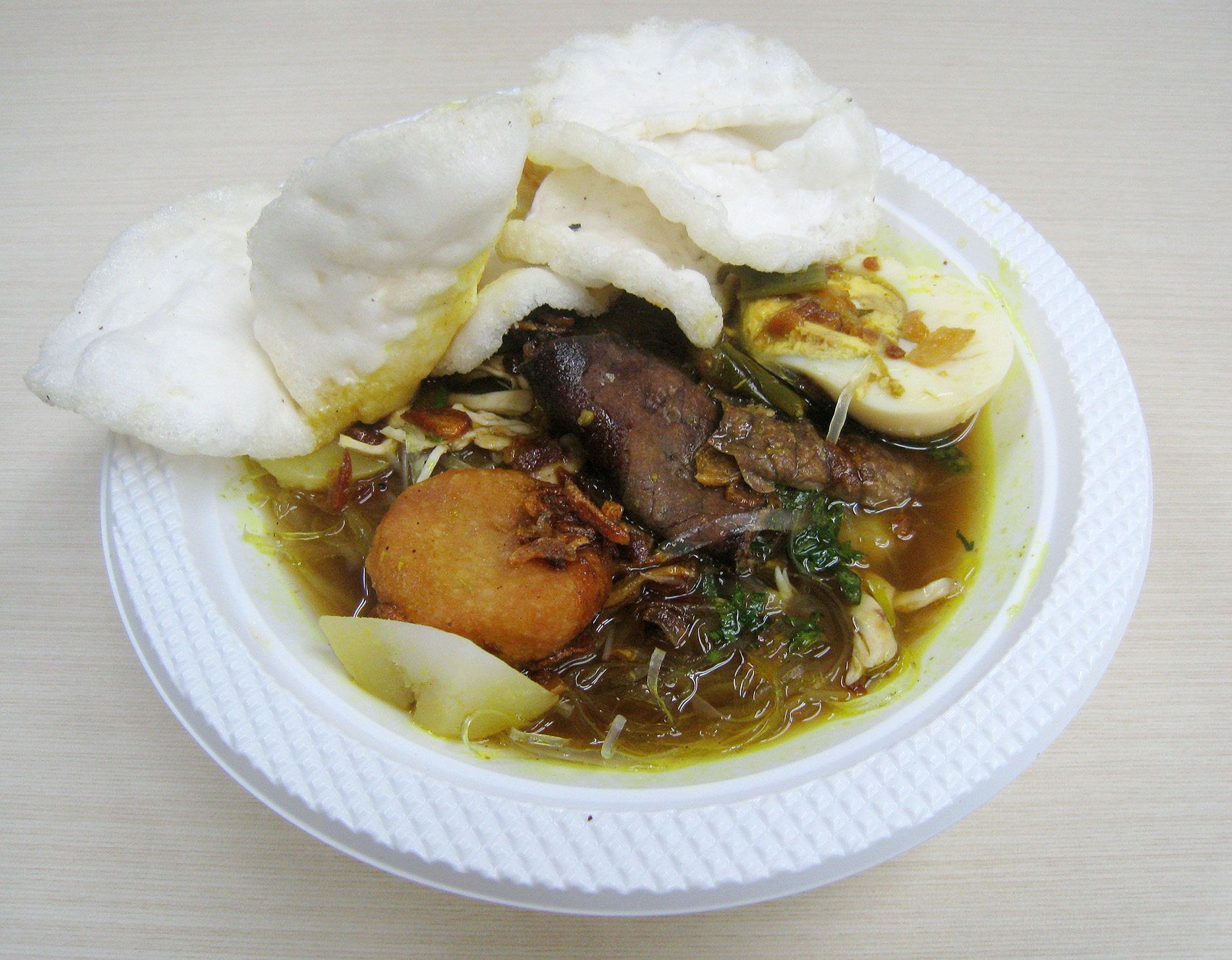
Soto Banjar, the specialty of Banjarmasin, South Kalimantan, Indonesia. Yellowish spicy broth with rice vermicelli, lontong rice cake, perkedel mashed potato fritter, fried cow lung, boiled egg, celery, fried shallot and krupuk cracker.

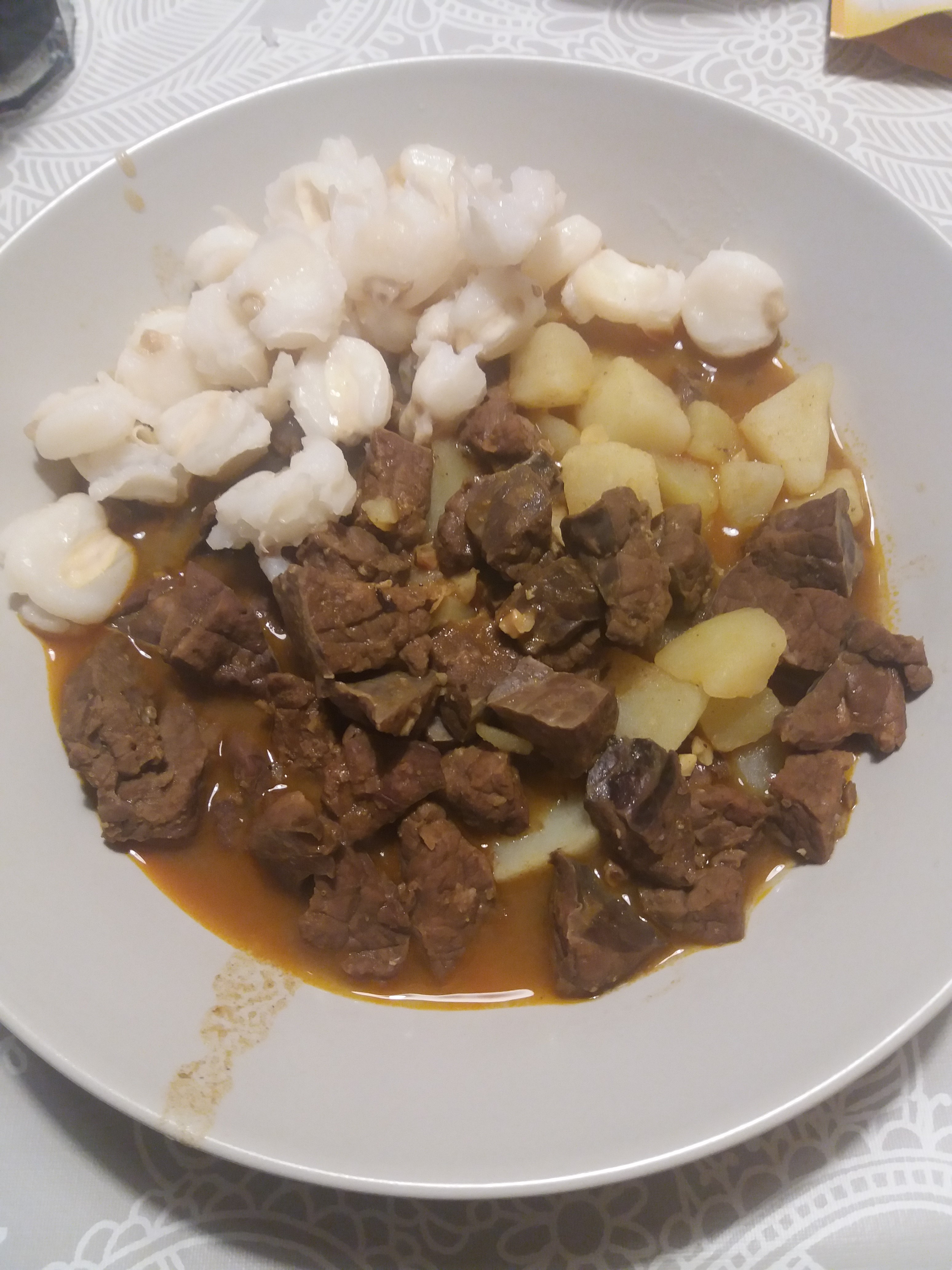
Peruvian chanfanita is made with bofe (cow lung) diced and cooked with diced potatoes with an aji panca sauce.

Cow lung is a type of offal used in various cuisines and also as a source for pulmonary surfactants. In Peru it is known as bofe, and in Nigeria as Fùkù. In Indonesia, Paru goreng (fried cow lung) is a popular type of Padang food, and Nasi kuning can be made with cow lung. In Bangladesh it is called Fapsha. Cow lung features in some Jewish cuisine, such as Viennese Kalbsbeuschel, which uses veal lung.

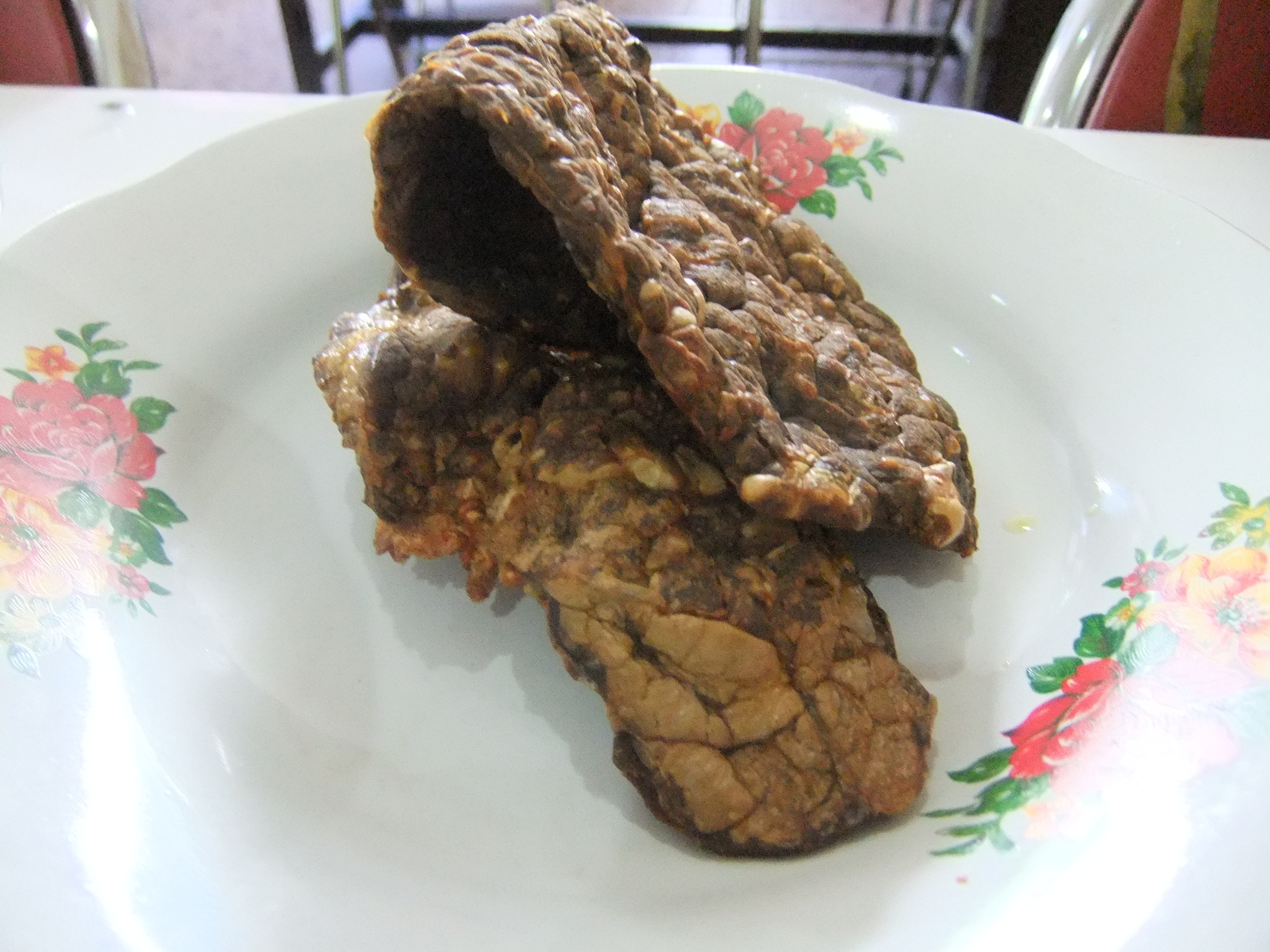
Padang style fried cow lung from Padang, Indonesia

In the medical field, animal-derived surfactants include Beractants Alveofact extracted from cow lung lavage fluid and Survanta extracted from minced cow lung with additional DPPC, palmitic acid and tripalmitin.

Defibrotide is a deoxyribonucleic acid derivative (single-stranded) derived from cow lung.
