= Sinigapuna =

Filipino rice dish

- Alternative names: yellow rice
- Course: Main course
- Place of origin: Philippines
- Region or state: Davao, Caraga
- Similar dishes: kuning, nasi kuning

Sinigapuna is a Filipino rice dish cooked with turmeric and other spices. It originates from Kalagan (or Caragan) people of the Caraga and Davao Regions of Mindanao. It is similar to the Maranao kuning, and Indonesian nasi kuning.

== See also ==
- Java rice
- Nasi goreng
- Palapa
- Sinangag
