= Java rice =

Fried rice dish from the Philippines

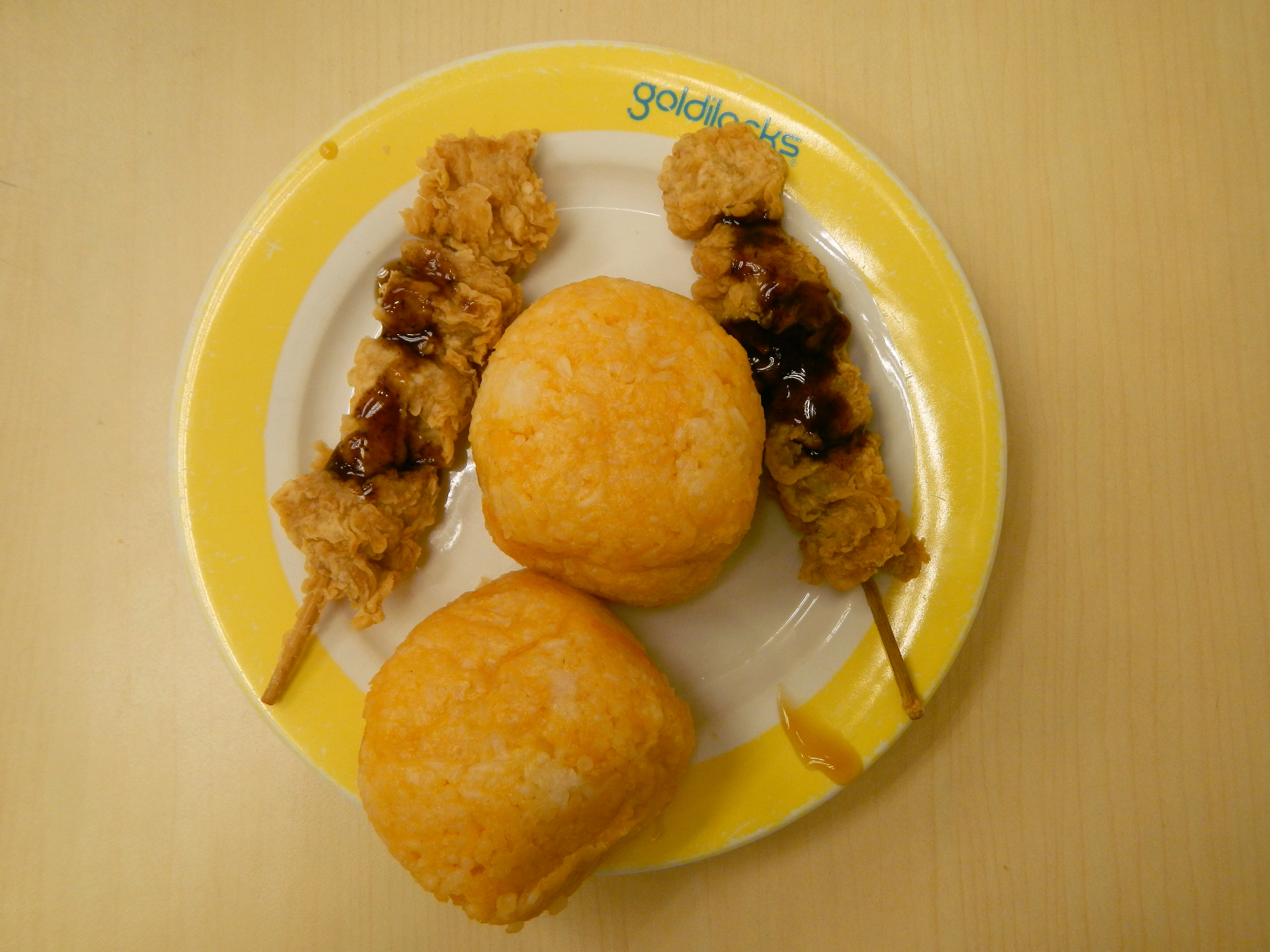
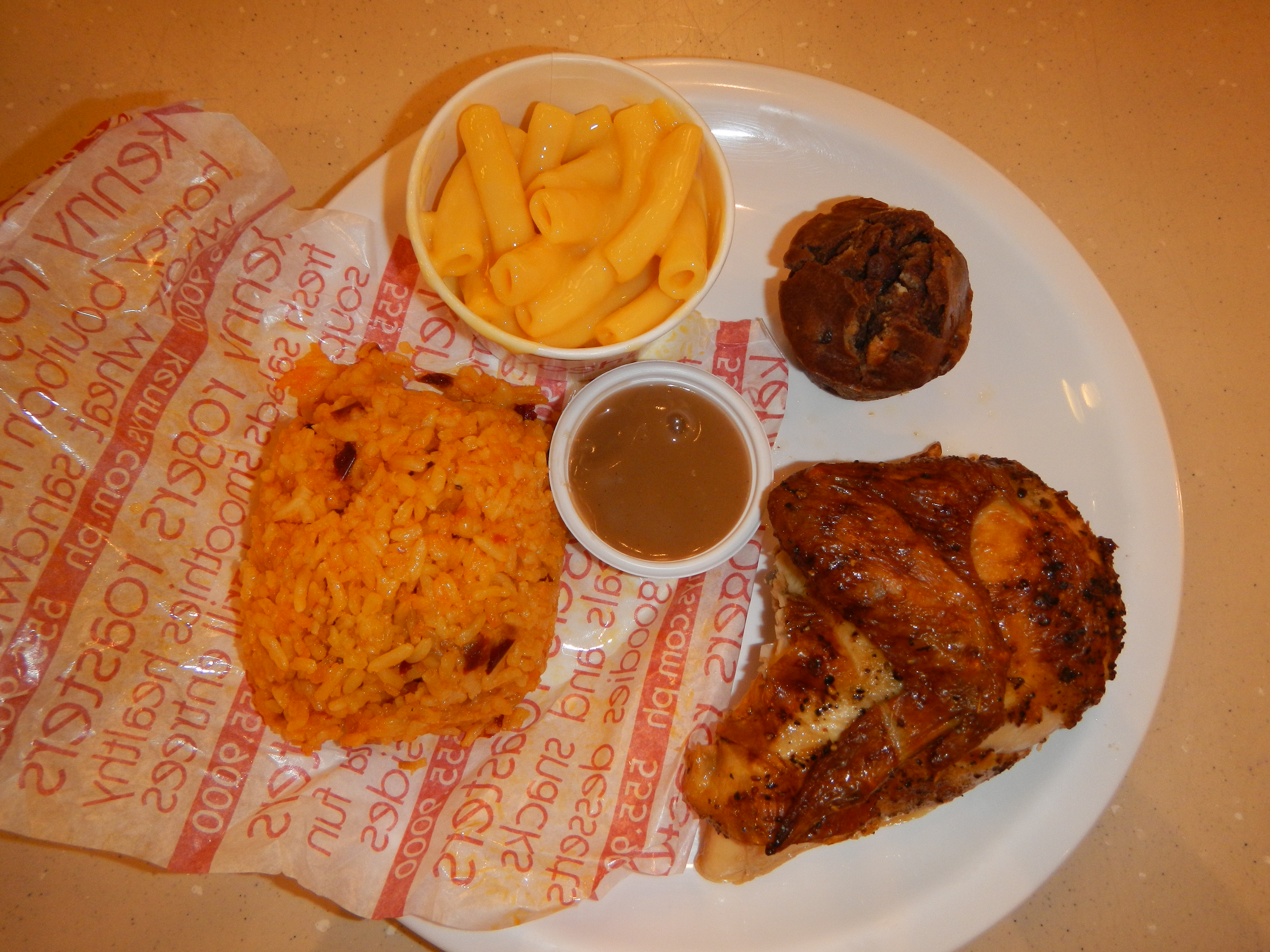
- Top: Plain java rice from Goldilocks Bakeshop, Bottom: Java rice with pimiento from Kenny Rogers Roasters
- Alternative names: Yellow fried rice
- Type: Fried rice
- Course: Part of main course, side dish
- Place of origin: Philippines
- Created by: Filipino cuisine
- Serving temperature: Warm
- Main ingredients: Rice, annatto or turmeric, garlic and/or onion
- Ingredients generally used: Paprika, pimiento or bell pepper, tomato ketchup

Java rice, sometimes called yellow fried rice, is a Filipino fried rice dish characterized by its yellow-orange tint from the use of turmeric or annatto. Variants of the dish add bell peppers, pimiento, paprika, and/or tomato ketchup to season the fried rice. Despite its name, it does not originate from Java or Indonesia in general.

Although its actual origin is uncertain, Java rice is associated with Engracia Cruz-Reyes' Aristocrat restaurant (founded in 1936 in Manila), in part due to their popularization of serving their chicken barbecue (inihaw) with this preparation of rice.

== See also ==
- Kuning – a Filipino rice dish with turmeric related to nasi kuning
- Sinigapuna – a Filipino rice dish with turmeric
- Arroz a la valenciana – a Hispanic Filipino yellow sticky rice dish, similar to paella
- Nasi goreng – a dark yellow-colored Indonesian fried rice dish which uses turmeric and other ingredients
- Nasi kuning – a yellow-colored Indonesian rice dish which uses turmeric and coconut milk
- Jollof rice
- Mexican rice
