= Ab Anar, Khuzestan =

Ab Anar آب‌انار
- Village
- Location within Iran Location within Middle East
- Coordinates: 32°42′16″N 48°51′10″E
- Country: Iran
- Province: Khuzestan
- County: Andimeshk
- Bakhsh: Alvar-e Garmsiri
- Rural District: Mazu

Population (2006)
  - Total: 61
- Time zone: UTC+3:30 (IRST)
  - Summer (DST): UTC+4:30 (IRDT)

Ab Anar (Persian: آب‌انار, also Romanized as Āb Anār) is a village in Mazu Rural District, Alvar-e Garmsiri District, Andimeshk County, Khuzestan province, Iran. During the 2006 census, its population was 61, in 9 families.
