= Abanar, Ilam =

Village in Ilam province, Iran

Abanar Persian: اب انار
- Village
- Location within Iran Location within Ilam Province
- Coordinates: 32°45′22″N 47°46′13″E
- Country: Iran
- Province: Ilam
- County: Abdanan
- District: Kalat
- Rural District: Abanar

Population (2016)
  - Total: 1,322
- Time zone: UTC+3:30 (IRST)

Abanar (Persian: اب انار) (Note: Also romanized as Ābānār and Āb-e Anār) is a village in, and the capital of, Abanar Rural District of Kalat District, Abdanan County, Ilam province, Iran.

== Demographics ==
=== Ethnicity ===
The village is populated by Kurds.

=== Population ===
At the time of the 2006 National Census, the village's population was 1,064 in 179 households. The following census in 2011 counted 1,309 people in 293 households. The 2016 census measured the population of the village as 1,322 people in 330 households. It was the most populous village in its rural district.
