= Kuning =

Filipino rice dish

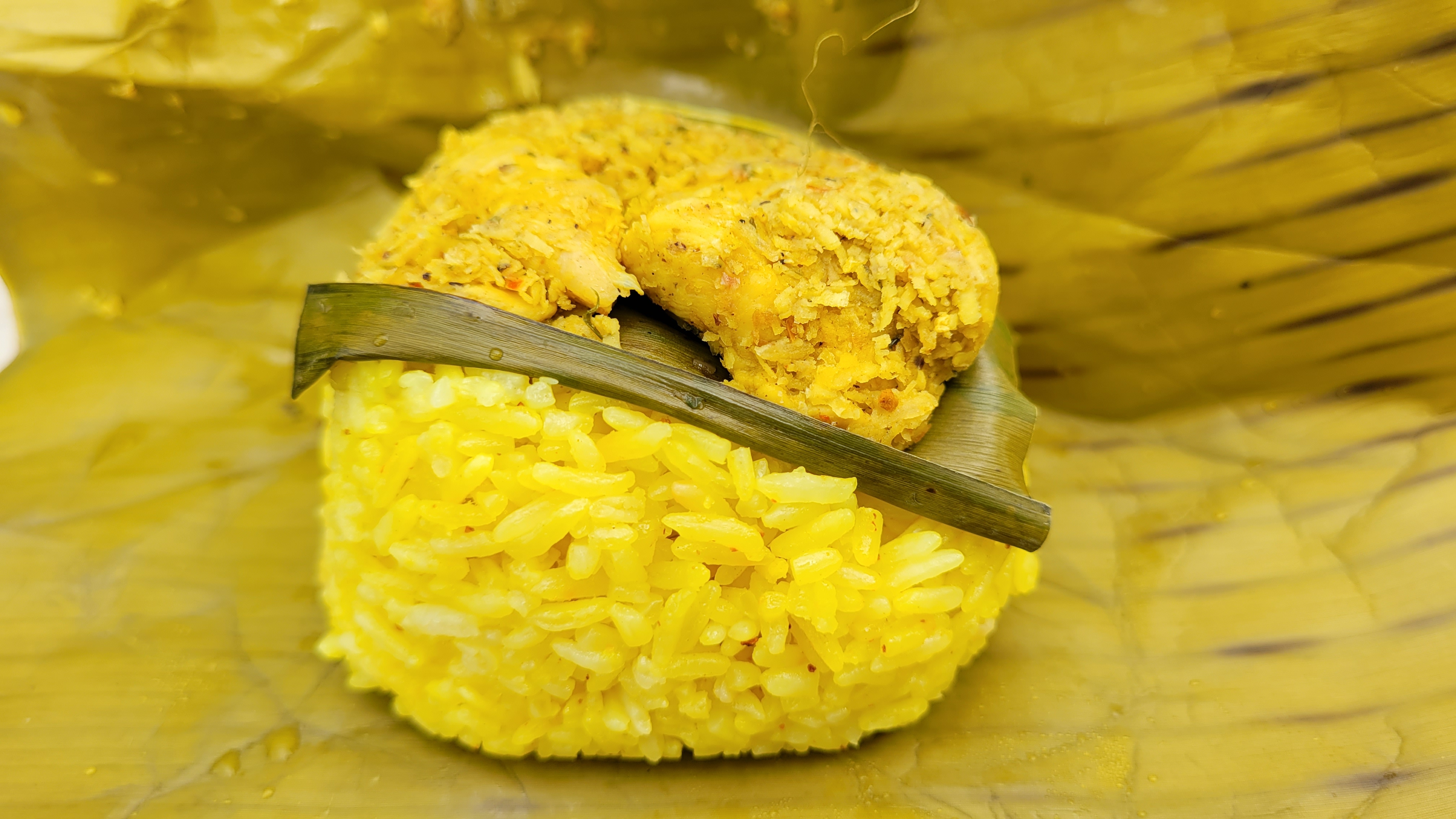
- Kuning in a Maranao chicken pater
- Alternative names: turmeric rice, yellow rice
- Course: Main course
- Place of origin: Philippines
- Region or state: Mindanao
- Main ingredients: white rice, turmeric, lemongrass, salt, bay leaves
- Similar dishes: sinigapuna, nasi kuning

Kuning, also spelled koning, kyuning, or kiyuning and Anglicized as yellow rice or turmeric rice, is a Filipino rice dish cooked with turmeric, lemongrass, salt, bay leaves, and other spices to taste. It originates from the island of Mindanao and is a staple food among the Maranao people of Lanao del Sur. It is related to the Indonesian nasi kuning of neighboring Sulawesi, but it does not use coconut milk. The dish is characteristically yellow because of the use of turmeric (kalawag in Maranao, and kunig or luyang dilaw in most other Philippine languages).

== See also ==
- Bringhe
- Java rice
- Palapa
- Sinigapuna
- Sinangag
