= Rahmat Rural District =

Rural district in Fars province, Iran

Rahmat Rural District Persian: دهستان رحمت
- Rural District
- Location within Iran
- Coordinates: 29°52′36″N 53°03′49″E
- Country: Iran
- Province: Fars
- County: Marvdasht
- District: Seyyedan
- Capital: Kareh Tavi

Population (2016)
  - Total: 12,966
- Time zone: UTC+3:30 (IRST)

Rahmat Rural District (Persian: دهستان رحمت) is in Seyyedan District of Marvdasht County, Fars province, Iran. Its capital is the village of Kareh Tavi. The previous capital of the rural district was the village of Abbasabad.

== Demographics ==
=== Population ===
At the time of the 2006 National Census, the rural district's population was 11,487 in 2,728 households. There were 11,379 inhabitants in 3,038 households at the following census of 2011. The 2016 census measured the population of the rural district as 12,966 in 3,655 households. The most populous of its 74 villages was Hasanabad-e Sanjarlu, with 1,648 people.
