= Khafrak-e Olya Rural District =

Rural district in Fars province, Iran

Khafrak-e Olya Rural District Persian: دهستان خفرک علیا
- Rural District
- Location within Iran
- Coordinates: 30°04′44″N 52°54′36″E
- Country: Iran
- Province: Fars
- County: Marvdasht
- District: Seyyedan
- Capital: Seyyedan

Population (2016)
  - Total: 11,310
- Time zone: UTC+3:30 (IRST)

Khafrak-e Olya Rural District (Persian: دهستان خفرک علیا) is in Seyyedan District of Marvdasht County, Fars province, Iran. It is administered from the city of Seyyedan.

== Demographics ==
=== Population ===
At the time of the 2006 National Census, the rural district's population was 9,987 in 2,621 households. There were 9,974 inhabitants in 2,919 households at the following census of 2011. The 2016 census measured the population of the rural district as 11,310 in 3,533 households. The most populous of its 50 villages was Faruq (now a city), with 5,860 people.
