= Seyyedan District =

District in Fars province, Iran

Seyyedan District Persian: بخش سیدان
- District
- Location within Iran
- Coordinates: 30°00′17″N 53°01′10″E
- Country: Iran
- Province: Fars
- County: Marvdasht
- Capital: Seyyedan

Population (2016)
  - Total: 32,850
- Time zone: UTC+3:30 (IRST)

Seyyedan District (Persian: بخش سیدان) is in Marvdasht County, Fars province, Iran. Its capital is the city of Seyyedan.

== History ==
After the 2016 National Census, the village of Faruq was elevated to city status.

== Demographics ==
=== Population ===
At the time of the 2006 census, the district's population was 29,029 in 7,303 households. The following census in 2011 counted 28,916 people in 8,127 households. The 2016 census measured the population of the district as 32,850 inhabitants in 9,754 households.

=== Administrative divisions ===
Seyyedan District Population
Administrative Divisions	2006	2011	2016
Khafrak-e Olya RD	9,987	9,974	11,310
Rahmat RD	11,487	11,379	12,966
Faruq (city) (Note: Became a city after the 2016 census)			
Seyyedan (city)	7,555	7,563	8,574
Total	29,029	28,916	32,850
RD = Rural District
