= Mansurabad =

Mansurabad or Mansoor Abad (Persian: منصوراباد) may refer to:

== Iran ==
=== Bushehr Province ===
- Mansurabad, Bushehr, a village in Dashtestan County

=== East Azerbaijan Province ===
- Mansurabad, East Azerbaijan, a village in Bostanabad County

=== Fars Province ===
- Mansurabad, Fars, a village in Darab County
- Mansurabad, Rostaq, a village in Darab County
- Mansurabad, Farashband, a village in Farashband County
- Mansurabad, Kazerun, a village in Kazerun County
- Mansurabad, Larestan, a village in Larestan County
- Mansurabad, Marvdasht, a village in Marvdasht County
- Mansurabad, Kamfiruz, a village in Marvdasht County
- Mansurabad, Rudbal, a village in Marvdasht County
- Mansurabad, Seyyedan, a village in Marvdasht County
- Mansurabad, Pasargad, a village in Pasargad County
- Mansurabad-e Olya, a village in Rostam County
- Mansurabad-e Sofla, a village in Rostam County
- Mansurabad, Shiraz, a village in Shiraz County

=== Hamadan Province ===
- Mansurabad, Hamadan, a village in Razan County

=== Ilam Province ===
- Mansurabad, former name of Mehran, Ilam, Iran

=== Isfahan Province ===
- Mansurabad, Isfahan, a village in Shahreza County

=== Kerman Province ===
- Mansurabad, Baft, a village in Baft County
- Mansurabad, Rafsanjan, a village in Rafsanjan County
- Mansurabad, Zeydabad, a village in Sirjan County

=== Kermanshah Province ===
- Mansurabad, Kermanshah, a village in Eslamabad-e Gharb County
- Mansurabad, alternate name of Amirabad, Eslamabad-e Gharb, a village in Eslamabad-e Gharb County
- Mansurabad, Ravansar, a village in Ravansar County

=== Khuzestan Province ===
- Mansurabad, Behbahan, a village in Behbahan County

=== Kohgiluyeh and Boyer-Ahmad Province ===
- Mansurabad-e Mehdiyeh, a village in Basht County
- Mansurabad, Sarrud-e Jonubi, a village in Boyer-Ahmad County
- Mansurabad-e Sarab Khamzan, a village in Boyer-Ahmad County

=== Mazandaran Province ===
- Mansurabad, Mazandaran, a village in Tonekabon County

=== North Khorasan Province ===
- Mansurabad, North Khorasan, a village in North Khorasan Province, Iran

=== Qom Province ===
- Mansurabad, Qom, a village in Qom Province, Iran

=== Sistan and Baluchestan Province ===
- Mansurabad, Chabahar, a village in Chabahar County
- Mansurabad, Khash, a village in Khash County

=== South Khorasan Province ===
- Mansurabad, Darmian, a village in Darmian County
- Mansurabad, Nehbandan, a village in Nehbandan County

=== West Azerbaijan Province ===
- Mansurabad, Miandoab, a village in Miandoab County
- Mansurabad, Urmia, a village in Urmia County

=== Yazd Province ===
- Mansurabad, Taft, a village in Taft County
- Mansurabad, Yazd, a village in Yazd County

== Pakistan ==
- Mansoorabad, Punjab, Pakistan
