= Maqsudabad =

Maqsudabad (Persian: مقصوداباد) may refer to:

- Maqsudabad, Mohammadabad, Marvdasht County, Fars Province
- Maqsudabad, Rudbal, Marvdasht County, Fars Province
- Maqsudabad, Sepidan, Sepidan County, Fars Province
- Maqsudabad, Jahrom, Jahrom County, Fars Province
- Maqsudabad, Kerman
- Maqsudabad, Lorestan
- Maqsudabad, alternate name of Masudabad, Lorestan
- Maqsudabad, Saveh, Markazi Province
- Maqsudabad, North Khorasan
- Maqsudabad, Mashhad, Razavi Khorasan Province
- Maqsudabad, Quchan, Razavi Khorasan Province
- Maqsudabad, West Azerbaijan
