= Goldasht (disambiguation) =

Goldasht is a city in Isfahan Province, Iran.

Goldasht (Persian: گلدشت) may also refer to:

- Goldasht-e Olya, Fars province
- Goldasht-e Sofla, Fars province
- Goldasht, Gilan
- Goldasht, Lorestan
- Goldasht, Markazi
- Goldasht, Mazandaran
- Goldasht, Sistan and Baluchestan
- Goldasht, Lamerd
- Goldasht District, an administrative division of Gomishan County in Golestan province, Iran
- Gol Dasht (disambiguation)
