= Dasht-e Soltanabad =

Dasht-e Soltanabad (Persian: دشت سلطان اباد) may refer to:

- Dasht-e Soltanabad 1
- Dasht-e Soltanabad 2
- Dasht-e Soltanabad 3
- Dasht-e Soltanabad 4
