= Rostaq =

Rostaq (Persian: رستاق), also rendered as Rastagh, may refer to:

- Rostaq, Afghanistan (village), a village in Takhar Province, Afghanistan
- Rustaq District, Afghanistan, a district in Takhar Province, Afghanistan
- Rostaq, Fars, Iran
- Rostaq, Hormozgan, Iran
- Rostaq District, an administrative subdivision of Iran
- Rostaq Rural District (disambiguation), administrative subdivisions of Iran
- Rustaq, a city in Oman
