= Kenareh =

Kenareh or Konareh (Persian: كناره) may refer to:

- Kenareh, Bushehr
- Konareh, Arsanjan, Fars Province
- Kenareh, Marvdasht, Fars Province
- Konareh, Rostam, Fars Province
- Konareh, Hormozgan
- Kenareh Rural District, in Fars Province
