= Estakhr (disambiguation) =

Estakhr is an ancient city in Fars Province, Iran.

Estakhr (Persian: استخر) may also refer to:

- Estakhr, Fars
- Estakhr, Kerman
- Estakhr, Razavi Khorasan
- Estakhr, Sistan and Baluchestan
- Estakhr, South Khorasan
- Estakhr-e Deraz, South Khorasan
