= Kamar Zard =

Kamar Zard or Kamar-e Zard (Persian: كمرزرد) may refer to:

- Kamar Zard, Bushehr
- Kamar Zard, Fars
- Kamar Zard, Kermanshah
- Kamar Zard, Razavi Khorasan
