= Kalateh-ye Rahman =

Kalateh-ye Rahman كلاته رحمان
- Village
- Location within Iran
- Coordinates: 35°32′53″N 59°53′07″E
- Country: Iran
- Province: Razavi Khorasan
- County: Fariman
- Bakhsh: Qalandarabad
- Rural District: Qalandarabad

Population (2006)
  - Total: 103
- Time zone: UTC+3:30 (IRST)
  - Summer (DST): UTC+4:30 (IRDT)

Kalateh-ye Rahman (Persian: كلاته رحمان, also Romanized as Kalāteh-ye Raḩmān) is a village in Qalandarabad Rural District, Qalandarabad District, Fariman County, Razavi Khorasan Province, Iran. At the 2006 census, its population was 103, in 29 families.
