= Solbuyeh =

Solbuyeh سلبويه
- Village
- Location within Iran
- Coordinates: 28°33′09″N 55°18′12″E
- Country: Iran
- Province: Fars
- County: Darab
- Bakhsh: Rostaq
- Rural District: Kuhestan

Population (2006)
  - Total: 20
- Time zone: UTC+3:30 (IRST)
  - Summer (DST): UTC+4:30 (IRDT)

Solbuyeh (Persian: سلبويه, also Romanized as Solbūyeh) is a village in Kuhestan Rural District, Rostaq District, Darab County, Fars province, Iran. At the 2006 census, its population was 20, in 5 families.
