= Dom Afshan =

Dom Afshan دم افشان
- Village
- Location within Iran
- Coordinates: 30°01′27″N 52°41′06″E
- Country: Iran
- Province: Fars
- County: Marvdasht
- Bakhsh: Central
- Rural District: Ramjerd-e Yek

Population (2006)
  - Total: 456
- Time zone: UTC+3:30 (IRST)
  - Summer (DST): UTC+4:30 (IRDT)

Dom Afshan (Persian: دم افشان, also Romanized as Dom Afshān, Dam Afshān, and Domafshān) is a village in Ramjerd-e Yek Rural District, in the Central District of Marvdasht County, Fars province, Iran. At the 2006 census, its population was 456, in 94 families.
