= Gowd-e Zereshk =

Gowd-e Zereshk گودزرشك
- Village
- Location within Iran
- Coordinates: 29°54′20″N 52°36′35″E
- Country: Iran
- Province: Fars
- County: Marvdasht
- Bakhsh: Central
- Rural District: Majdabad

Population (2006)
  - Total: 371
- Time zone: UTC+3:30 (IRST)
  - Summer (DST): UTC+4:30 (IRDT)

Gowd-e Zereshk (Persian: گودزرشك, also Romanized as Gowd Zereshk; also known as Gowdzereshk-e Rāmjerd) is a village in Majdabad Rural District, in the Central District of Marvdasht County, Fars province, Iran. At the 2006 census, its population was 371, in 86 families.
