= Maragallu =

Maragallu مراگلو
- Village
- Location within Iran
- Coordinates: 29°52′58″N 52°42′01″E
- Country: Iran
- Province: Fars
- County: Marvdasht
- Bakhsh: Central
- Rural District: Majdabad

Population (2006)
  - Total: 1,582
- Time zone: UTC+3:30 (IRST)
  - Summer (DST): UTC+4:30 (IRDT)

Maragallu (Persian: مراگلو, also romanized as Marāgallū, Maragallow, and Maregallū) is a village in Majdabad Rural District, in the Central District of Marvdasht County, Fars province, Iran. At the 2006 census, its population was 1,582, in 380 families.
