= Saru =

Saru may refer to:

- Saru (猿), the most common "monkey" word in the Japanese language

== Arts, entertainment, and media ==
=== Fictional characters ===
- Saru (Star Trek: Discovery), a fictional character in the television series Star Trek: Discovery

=== Television ===
- Saru (2025 TV series) a 2025–2026 Indian-Hindi language television series

== Places ==
=== Iran ===
- Saru, ancient name of Sari, Iran
- Saru, Fars, a village in Fars Province
- Saru, Mazandaran, a village in Mazandaran Province
- Saru castles in Semnan

=== Japan ===
- Saru River, river in Hokkaidō
- Saru District, Hokkaidō
- Mount Saru, in the Hidaka Mountains, Hokkaidō

=== Romania ===
- Șaru Dornei, a commune located in Suceava County
- Saru, a village in Valea Mare Commune, Dâmbovița County

=== Estonia ===
- Saru, Estonia, village in Rõuge Parish, Võru County

== Sports ==
- South African Rugby Union (SACOS) (founded 1966), the former South African Coloured Rugby Football Board and founder member in 1973 of the South African Council on Sport the non-racial anti-apartheid organization
- South African Rugby Union (founded 1992), the governing body for rugby union in South Africa which emerged from the unification of the South African Rugby Board and the South African Rugby Union

== Other uses ==
- SARU-3, a space fortress in Ape Escape 3
- George Saru (1920–2003), a Romanian-American painter
- Science Saru, a Japanese animation studio

== See also ==
- Sarutobi (disambiguation)
- Sarus (disambiguation)
