= Falunak =

Falunak فالونك
- Village
- Location within Iran
- Coordinates: 29°59′00″N 52°40′17″E
- Country: Iran
- Province: Fars
- County: Marvdasht
- Bakhsh: Central
- Rural District: Ramjerd-e Yek

Population (2006)
  - Total: 503
- Time zone: UTC+3:30 (IRST)
  - Summer (DST): UTC+4:30 (IRDT)
- Website: faloonak.blogfa.com

Falunak (Persian: فالونك, also Romanized as Fālūnak) is a village in Ramjerd-e Yek Rural District, in the Central District of Marvdasht County, Fars province, Iran. At the 2006 census, its population was 503, in 108 families.
