= Qalat-e Godar Boneh =

Qalat-e Godar Boneh قلات گدار بنه
- Village
- Country: Iran
- Province: Fars
- County: Darab
- Bakhsh: Rostaq
- Rural District: Kuhestan

Population (2006)
  - Total: 20
- Time zone: UTC+3:30 (IRST)
  - Summer (DST): UTC+4:30 (IRDT)

Qalat-e Godar Boneh (Persian: قلات گدار بنه, also Romanized as Qalāt-e Godār Boneh) is a village in Kuhestan Rural District, Rostaq District, Darab County, Fars province, Iran. At the 2006 census, its population was 20, in 5 families.
