= Happan =

Happan هپان
- Village
- Location within Iran
- Coordinates: 28°23′45″N 55°00′15″E
- Country: Iran
- Province: Fars
- County: Darab
- Bakhsh: Rostaq
- Rural District: Rostaq

Population (2006)
  - Total: 32
- Time zone: UTC+3:30 (IRST)
  - Summer (DST): UTC+4:30 (IRDT)

Happan (Persian: هپان, also Romanized as Happān) is a village in Rostaq Rural District, Rostaq District, Darab County, Fars province, Iran. At the 2006 census, its population was 32, in 7 families.
