= Gondeshlu =

Gondeshlu or Gondashlu (Persian: گندشلو), also rendered as Gundashlu, may refer to:

- Gondeshlu-ye Bala
- Gondeshlu-ye Pain
