= Chah Kandar =

Chah Kandar چاه كندر
- Village
- Location within Iran
- Coordinates: 28°33′45″N 55°15′42″E
- Country: Iran
- Province: Fars
- County: Darab
- Bakhsh: Rostaq
- Rural District: Kuhestan

Population (2006)
  - Total: 157
- Time zone: UTC+3:30 (IRST)
  - Summer (DST): UTC+4:30 (IRDT)

Chah Kandar (Persian: چاه كندر, also Romanized as Chāh Kandar and Chāh-e Kandār; also known as Chāh-e Kandeh and Chāh Kandeh) is a village in Kuhestan Rural District, Rostaq District, Darab County, Fars province, Iran. At the 2006 census, its population was 157, in 31 families.
