= Kateh Shamshir =

Kateh Shamshir (Persian: كته شمشير) may refer to:

- Kateh Shamshir-e Olya
- Kateh Shamshir-e Sofla
