= Golestan, Fariman =

Golestan گلستان
- Village
- Interactive map of Golestan
- Location within Iran Location within Asia
- Coordinates: 35°31′09″N 59°58′44″E
- Country: Iran
- Province: Razavi Khorasan
- County: Fariman
- Bakhsh: Qalandarabad
- Rural District: Qalandarabad

Population (2006)
  - Total: 129
- Time zone: UTC+3:30 (IRST)
  - Summer (DST): UTC+4:30 (IRDT)

Golestan (Persian: گلستان, also Romanized as Golestān; also known as Golestān-e Mashtī Vahāb) is a village in Qalandarabad Rural District, Qalandarabad District, Fariman County, Razavi Khorasan Province, Iran. At the 2006 census, its population was 129, in 32 families.

== Geography ==
The village is situated on the Iranian Plateau and is 144.1 km (89.4 miles) away from Mashhad.
