= Kalateh-ye Abbas =

Kalateh-ye Abbas كلاته عباس
- Village
- Location within Iran
- Coordinates: 35°33′03″N 59°52′01″E
- Country: Iran
- Province: Razavi Khorasan
- County: Fariman
- Bakhsh: Qalandarabad
- Rural District: Qalandarabad

Population (2006)
  - Total: 71
- Time zone: UTC+3:30 (IRST)
  - Summer (DST): UTC+4:30 (IRDT)

Kalateh-ye Abbas (Persian: كلاته عباس, also Romanized as Kalāteh-ye ‘Abbās) is a village in Qalandarabad Rural District, Qalandarabad District, Fariman County, Razavi Khorasan Province, Iran. At the 2006 census, its population was 71, in 14 families.
