= Beryanak =

Beryanak بریانک
- Village
- Location within Iran
- Coordinates: 29°50′51″N 52°58′36″E
- Country: Iran
- Province: Fars
- County: Marvdasht
- Bakhsh: Central
- Rural District: Mohammadabad

Population (2006)
  - Total: 263
- Time zone: UTC+3:30 (IRST)
  - Summer (DST): UTC+4:30 (IRDT)

Beryanak (Persian: بریانک, also Romanized as Beryānak and Berīānak) is a village in Mohammadabad Rural District, in the Central District of Marvdasht County, Fars province, Iran. At the 2006 census, its population was 263, in 62 families.
