= Qaleh Sargodar =

Qaleh Sargodar قلعه سرگدار
- Village
- Country: Iran
- Province: Fars
- County: Darab
- Bakhsh: Rostaq
- Rural District: Kuhestan

Population (2006)
  - Total: 24
- Time zone: UTC+3:30 (IRST)
  - Summer (DST): UTC+4:30 (IRDT)

Qaleh Sargodar (Persian: قلعه سرگدار, also Romanized as Qal‘eh Sargodār) is a village in Kuhestan Rural District, Rostaq District, Darab County, Fars province, Iran. At the 2006 census, its population was 24, in 7 families.
