= Esfaderan =

Esfaderan اسفدران
- Village
- Location within Iran
- Coordinates: 29°59′13″N 52°44′18″E
- Country: Iran
- Province: Fars
- County: Marvdasht
- Bakhsh: Central
- Rural District: Ramjerd-e Yek

Population (2006)
  - Total: 699
- Time zone: UTC+3:30 (IRST)
  - Summer (DST): UTC+4:30 (IRDT)

Esfaderan (Persian: اسفدران, also Romanized as Esfaderān and Esfadrān; also known as Esfandarān and Isfardeh) is a village in Ramjerd-e Yek Rural District, in the Central District of Marvdasht County, Fars province, Iran. At the 2006 census, its population was 699, in 161 families.
