= Sang-e Noqreh =

Sang-e Noqreh سنگ نقره
- Village
- Location within Iran
- Coordinates: 35°28′46″N 59°51′47″E
- Country: Iran
- Province: Razavi Khorasan
- County: Fariman
- Bakhsh: Qalandarabad
- Rural District: Qalandarabad

Population (2006)
  - Total: 239
- Time zone: UTC+3:30 (IRST)
  - Summer (DST): UTC+4:30 (IRDT)

Sang-e Noqreh (Persian: سنگ نقره) is a village in Qalandarabad Rural District, Qalandarabad District, Fariman County, Razavi Khorasan Province, Iran. At the 2006 census, its population was 239, in 59 families.
