= Cheshmeh Ayyub =

Cheshmeh Ayyub چشمه ايوب
- Village
- Location within Iran
- Coordinates: 35°36′47″N 59°51′45″E
- Country: Iran
- Province: Razavi Khorasan
- County: Fariman
- Bakhsh: Qalandarabad
- Rural District: Qalandarabad

Population (2006)
  - Total: 54
- Time zone: UTC+3:30 (IRST)
  - Summer (DST): UTC+4:30 (IRDT)

Cheshmeh Ayyub (Persian: چشمه ايوب, also Romanized as Cheshmeh Ayyūb and Cheshmeh-ye Ayyūb) is a village in Qalandarabad Rural District, Qalandarabad District, Fariman County, Razavi Khorasan Province, Iran. At the 2006 census, its population was 54, in 15 families.
