= Hoseynabad, Marvdasht =

Hoseynabad حسين اباد
- Village
- Location within Iran
- Coordinates: 29°59′30″N 52°51′45″E
- Country: Iran
- Province: Fars
- County: Marvdasht
- Bakhsh: Central
- Rural District: Naqsh-e Rostam

Population (2006)
  - Total: 703
- Time zone: UTC+3:30 (IRST)
  - Summer (DST): UTC+4:30 (IRDT)

Hoseynabad (Persian: حسين اباد, also Romanized as Ḩoseynābād; also known as Ḩasanābād and Ḩoseynābād-e Estakhr) is a village in Naqsh-e Rostam Rural District, in the Central District of Marvdasht County, Fars province, Iran. At the 2006 census, its population was 703, in 155 families.
