= Zarqanak =

Zarqanak زرقانك
- Village
- Location within Iran
- Coordinates: 30°01′21″N 52°38′20″E
- Country: Iran
- Province: Fars
- County: Marvdasht
- Bakhsh: Central
- Rural District: Ramjerd-e Yek

Population (2006)
  - Total: 733
- Time zone: UTC+3:30 (IRST)
  - Summer (DST): UTC+4:30 (IRDT)

Zarqanak (Persian: زرقانك, also Romanized as Zarqānak; also known as Zarjānak) is a village in Ramjerd-e Yek Rural District, in the Central District of Marvdasht County, Fars province, Iran. At the 2006 census, its population was 733, in 168 families.
