= Yakhdan =

Yakhdan (Persian: يخدان) may refer to:

- Yakhdan, Afghanistan
- Yakhdan, Iran
