= Estarkhi =

Estarkhi (Persian: اسطرخي), also rendered as Estakhri, may refer to:

- Estakhri, Fars
- Estarkhi, Faruj, North Khorasan Province
- Estarkhi, Shirvan, North Khorasan Province

== See also ==
- Estakhr
- Estarkh
