= Chah Mahi =

Chah Mahi چاه ماهي
- Village
- Location within Iran
- Coordinates: 28°28′55″N 55°01′52″E
- Country: Iran
- Province: Fars
- County: Darab
- Bakhsh: Rostaq
- Rural District: Rostaq

Population (2006)
  - Total: 105
- Time zone: UTC+3:30 (IRST)
  - Summer (DST): UTC+4:30 (IRDT)

Chah Mahi (Persian: چاه ماهي, also Romanized as Chāh Māhī, Chāh-e Ma‘ī, Chāh-e Mo‘ī, and Chāh Mo‘ī) is a village in Rostaq Rural District, Rostaq District, Darab County, Fars province, Iran. As of the 2006 census, its population was 105, in 23 families.
