= Bi Kanda =

Bi Kanda بي كندا
- Village
- Location within Iran
- Coordinates: 28°34′29″N 55°01′01″E
- Country: Iran
- Province: Fars
- County: Darab
- Bakhsh: Rostaq
- Rural District: Rostaq

Population (2006)
  - Total: 35
- Time zone: UTC+3:30 (IRST)
  - Summer (DST): UTC+4:30 (IRDT)

Bi Kanda (Persian: بي كندا, also Romanized as Bī Kandā) is a village in Rostaq Rural District, Rostaq District, Darab County, Fars province, Iran. At the 2006 census, its population was 35, in 10 families.
