= Mah Salari =

Mah Salari ماه سالاري
- Village
- Location within Iran
- Coordinates: 28°39′07″N 55°07′32″E
- Country: Iran
- Province: Fars
- County: Darab
- Bakhsh: Rostaq
- Rural District: Kuhestan

Population (2006)
  - Total: 90
- Time zone: UTC+3:30 (IRST)
  - Summer (DST): UTC+4:30 (IRDT)

Mah Salari (Persian: ماه سالاري, also romanized as Māh Sālārī; also known as Māsālārī) is a village in Kuhestan Rural District, Rostaq District, Darab County, Fars province, Iran. At the 2006 census its population was 90, in 24 families.
