= Do Shakh =

Do Shakh (Persian: دوشاخ) may refer to:

- Do Shakh, Afghanistan
- Do Shakh, Iran
