= Chah Muri =

Chah Muri چاه موري
- Village
- Location within Iran
- Coordinates: 28°25′35″N 55°19′05″E
- Country: Iran
- Province: Fars
- County: Darab
- Bakhsh: Rostaq
- Rural District: Kuhestan

Population (2006)
  - Total: 31
- Time zone: UTC+3:30 (IRST)
  - Summer (DST): UTC+4:30 (IRDT)

Chah Muri (Persian: چاه موري, also Romanized as Chāh Mūrī) is a village in Kuhestan Rural District, Rostaq District, Darab County, Fars province, Iran. At the 2006 census, its population was 31, in 7 families.
