= Karghesh-e Olya =

Karghesh-e Olya كارغش عليا
- Village
- Location within Iran
- Coordinates: 35°45′34″N 60°13′59″E
- Country: Iran
- Province: Razavi Khorasan
- County: Fariman
- Bakhsh: Qalandarabad
- Rural District: Sefid Sang

Population (2006)
  - Total: 131
- Time zone: UTC+3:30 (IRST)
  - Summer (DST): UTC+4:30 (IRDT)

Karghesh-e Olya (Persian: كارغش عليا, also Romanized as Kārghesh-e ‘Olyā; also known as Kārghesh-e Bālā) is a village in Sefid Sang Rural District, Qalandarabad District, Fariman County, Razavi Khorasan Province, Iran. At the 2006 census, its population was 131, in 33 families.
