= Dasht-e Mil =

Dasht-e Mil (Persian: دشت ميل) may refer to:

- Dasht-e Mil-e Olya
- Dasht-e Mil-e Sofla
