= Taraz-e Khaki =

Taraz-e Khaki طرازخاكي
- Village
- Location within Iran
- Coordinates: 35°32′06″N 59°59′43″E
- Country: Iran
- Province: Razavi Khorasan
- County: Fariman
- Bakhsh: Qalandarabad
- Rural District: Qalandarabad

Population (2006)
  - Total: 126
- Time zone: UTC+3:30 (IRST)
  - Summer (DST): UTC+4:30 (IRDT)

Taraz-e Khaki (Persian: طرازخاكي, also Romanized as Ţarāz-e Khākī; also known as Ţarāz-e Khālī) is a village in Qalandarabad Rural District, Qalandarabad District, Fariman County, Razavi Khorasan Province, Iran. At the 2006 census, its population was 126, in 32 families.
