= Soltan-e Velayat =

Soltan-e Velayat سلطان ولايت
- Village
- Location within Iran
- Coordinates: 29°51′56″N 53°00′15″E
- Country: Iran
- Province: Fars
- County: Marvdasht
- Bakhsh: Central
- Rural District: Mohammadabad

Population (2006)
  - Total: 1,176
- Time zone: UTC+3:30 (IRST)
  - Summer (DST): UTC+4:30 (IRDT)

Soltan-e Velayat (Persian: سلطان ولايت, also Romanized as Solţān-e Velāyat, Soltan Valayat, and Solţān Velāyat) is a village in Mohammadabad Rural District, in the Central District of Marvdasht County, Fars province, Iran. At the 2006 census, its population was 1,176, in 270 families.
