= Jevenjan =

Jevenjan جونجان
- Village
- Location within Iran
- Coordinates: 29°55′33″N 52°48′45″E
- Country: Iran
- Province: Fars
- County: Marvdasht
- Bakhsh: Central
- Rural District: Kenareh

Population (2006)
  - Total: 160
- Time zone: UTC+3:30 (IRST)
  - Summer (DST): UTC+4:30 (IRDT)

Jevenjan (Persian: جونجان, also Romanized as Jevenjān) is a village in Kenareh Rural District, in the Central District of Marvdasht County, Fars province, Iran. At the 2006 census, its population was 160, in 46 families.
