= Goli Kuh =

Goli Kuh گلي كوه
- Village
- Location within Iran
- Coordinates: 28°37′53″N 55°15′33″E
- Country: Iran
- Province: Fars
- County: Darab
- Bakhsh: Rostaq
- Rural District: Kuhestan

Population (2006)
  - Total: 102
- Time zone: UTC+3:30 (IRST)
  - Summer (DST): UTC+4:30 (IRDT)

Goli Kuh (Persian: گلي كوه, also Romanized as Golī Kūh; also known as Gāv Kūh and Gulukūh) is a village in Kuhestan Rural District, Rostaq District, Darab County, Fars province, Iran. At the 2006 census, its population was 102, in 23 families.
