= Cheshmeh-ye Sang Band =

Cheshmeh-ye Sang Band (Persian: چشمه سنگ بند) may refer to:

- Cheshmeh-ye Sang Band (1)
- Cheshmeh-ye Sang Band (2)
