= Pich Kuh =

Pich Kuh پيچكوه
- Village
- Location within Iran
- Coordinates: 28°40′54″N 55°15′22″E
- Country: Iran
- Province: Fars
- County: Darab
- Bakhsh: Rostaq
- Rural District: Kuhestan

Population (2006)
  - Total: 25
- Time zone: UTC+3:30 (IRST)
  - Summer (DST): UTC+4:30 (IRDT)

Pich Kuh (Persian: پيچكوه, also Romanized as Pīch Kūh; also known as Pīch Kūh-e 'Olyā) is a village in Kuhestan Rural District, Rostaq District, Darab County, Fars province, Iran. At the 2006 census, its population was 25, in 6 families.
