= Kahnehbid =

Kahnehbid كهنه بيد
- Village
- Location within Iran
- Coordinates: 28°28′35″N 55°20′34″E
- Country: Iran
- Province: Fars
- County: Darab
- Bakhsh: Rostaq
- Rural District: Kuhestan

Population (2006)
  - Total: 38
- Time zone: UTC+3:30 (IRST)
  - Summer (DST): UTC+4:30 (IRDT)

Kahnehbid (Persian: كهنه بيد, also Romanized as Kahnehbīd) is a village in Kuhestan Rural District, Rostaq District, Darab County, Fars province, Iran. At the 2006 census, its population was 38, in 12 families.
