= Deh Chasht =

Deh Chasht ده چاشت
- Village
- Location within Iran
- Coordinates: 29°47′24″N 52°57′29″E
- Country: Iran
- Province: Fars
- County: Marvdasht
- Bakhsh: Central
- Rural District: Mohammadabad

Population (2006)
  - Total: 184
- Time zone: UTC+3:30 (IRST)
  - Summer (DST): UTC+4:30 (IRDT)

Deh Chasht (Persian: ده چاشت, also Romanized as Deh Chāsht) is a village in Mohammadabad Rural District, in the Central District of Marvdasht County, Fars province, Iran. At the 2006 census, its population was 184, in 46 families.
