= Marzu =

Marzu مرزو
- Village
- Location within Iran
- Coordinates: 28°33′16″N 54°58′31″E
- Country: Iran
- Province: Fars
- County: Darab
- Bakhsh: Rostaq
- Rural District: Rostaq

Population (2006)
  - Total: 7
- Time zone: UTC+3:30 (IRST)
  - Summer (DST): UTC+4:30 (IRDT)

Marzu (Persian: مرزو, also Romanized as Marzū; also known as Mazrū) is a village in Rostaq Rural District, Rostaq District, Darab County, Fars province, Iran. At the 2006 census, its population was 7, in 4 families.
