= Omidiyeh, Fars =

Omidiyeh اميديه
- Village
- Location within Iran
- Coordinates: 29°59′13″N 52°52′05″E
- Country: Iran
- Province: Fars
- County: Marvdasht
- Bakhsh: Central
- Rural District: Naqsh-e Rostam

Population (2016)
  - Total: 317
- Time zone: UTC+3:30 (IRST)
  - Summer (DST): UTC+4:30 (IRDT)

Omidiyeh (Persian: اميديه, also Romanized as Omīdīyeh) is a village in Naqsh-e Rostam Rural District, in the Central District of Marvdasht County, Fars province, Iran. At the 2006 census, its population was 291, in 73 families.
