= Hasanabad-e Tall Kamin =

Hasanabad-e Tall Kamin حسن ابادتل كمين
- Village
- Location within Iran
- Coordinates: 30°01′03″N 52°49′49″E
- Country: Iran
- Province: Fars
- County: Marvdasht
- Bakhsh: Central
- Rural District: Naqsh-e Rostam

Population (2016)
  - Total: 822
- Time zone: UTC+3:30 (IRST)
  - Summer (DST): UTC+4:30 (IRDT)

Hasanabad-e Tall Kamin (Persian: حسن ابادتل كمين, also Romanized as Ḩasanābād-e Tall Kamīn, Ḩasanābād-e Tol Kamīn, and Ḩasanābād Tol Kamīn; also known as Ḩoseynābād Kamīn) is a village in Naqsh-e Rostam Rural District, in the Central District of Marvdasht County, Fars province, Iran. At the 2006 census, its population was 928, in 203 families.
