= Shahrak-e Vali-ye Asr =

Shahrak-e Vali-ye Asr or Shahrak-e Valiasr or Shahrak-e Vali Asr (Persian: سهرك ولي عصر) may refer to various places in Iran:

- Shahrak-e Vali Asr, Ardabil
- Shahrak-e Vali-ye Asr, Darab, Fars Province
- Shahrak-e Vali-ye Asr, Marvdasht, Fars Province
- Shahrak-e Vali-ye Asr, Ilam
- Shahrak-e Vali-ye Asr, Darreh Shahr, Ilam Province
- Shahrak-e Vali-ye Asr, Isfahan
- Shahrak-e Vali-ye Asr, Khuzestan
- Shahrak-e Vali-ye Asr, Kohgiluyeh and Boyer-Ahmad
- Shahrak-e Vali-ye Asr, Lorestan
- Shahrak-e Vali-ye Asr, Markazi
