= Daq Ahu =

Daq Ahu دق اهو
- Village
- Location within Iran
- Coordinates: 28°37′30″N 55°14′10″E
- Country: Iran
- Province: Fars
- County: Darab
- Bakhsh: Rostaq
- Rural District: Kuhestan

Population (2006)
  - Total: 89
- Time zone: UTC+3:30 (IRST)
  - Summer (DST): UTC+4:30 (IRDT)

Daq Ahu (Persian: دق اهو, also Romanized as Daq Āhū) is a village in Kuhestan Rural District, Rostaq District, Darab County, Fars province, Iran. At the 2006 census, its population was 89, in 18 families.
