= Mazar-e Bi Abeh =

Mazar-e Bi Abeh مزاربي ابه
- Village
- Location within Iran
- Coordinates: 35°31′30″N 59°55′36″E
- Country: Iran
- Province: Razavi Khorasan
- County: Fariman
- Bakhsh: Qalandarabad
- Rural District: Qalandarabad

Population (2006)
  - Total: 117
- Time zone: UTC+3:30 (IRST)
  - Summer (DST): UTC+4:30 (IRDT)

Mazar-e Bi Abeh (Persian: مزاربي ابه, also Romanized as Mazār-e Bī Ābeh; also known as Mazār-e Bī Āb and Mazār-e Bī Ābī) is a village in Qalandarabad Rural District, Qalandarabad District, Fariman County, Razavi Khorasan Province, Iran. At the 2006 census, its population was 117, in 26 families.
