= Shahrak-e Mahdiyeh =

Shahrak-e Mahdiyeh شهرک مهديه
- Village
- Location within Iran
- Coordinates: 29°55′15″N 52°50′35″E
- Country: Iran
- Province: Fars
- County: Marvdasht
- Bakhsh: Central
- Rural District: Kenareh

Population (2006)
  - Total: 2,132
- Time zone: UTC+3:30 (IRST)
  - Summer (DST): UTC+4:30 (IRDT)

Shahrak-e Mahdiyeh (Persian: شهرک مهديه, also Romanized as Shahrak-e Mahdīyeh) is a village in Kenareh Rural District, in the Central District of Marvdasht County, Fars province, Iran. At the 2006 census, its population was 2,132, in 526 families.
