= Chaharta Gav =

Chaharta Gav چهارتاگاو
- Village
- Location within Iran
- Coordinates: 35°48′42″N 60°15′12″E
- Country: Iran
- Province: Razavi Khorasan
- County: Fariman
- Bakhsh: Qalandarabad
- Rural District: Sefid Sang

Population (2006)
  - Total: 8
- Time zone: UTC+3:30 (IRST)
  - Summer (DST): UTC+4:30 (IRDT)

Chaharta Gav (Persian: چهارتاگاو, also Romanized as Chahārtā Gāv) is a village in Sefid Sang Rural District, Qalandarabad District, Fariman County, Razavi Khorasan Province, Iran. At the 2006 census, its population was 8, in 4 families.
