= Rashmijan =

Rashmijan رشميجان
- Village
- Location within Iran
- Coordinates: 29°52′39″N 52°51′14″E
- Country: Iran
- Province: Fars
- County: Marvdasht
- Bakhsh: Central
- Rural District: Kenareh

Population (2006)
  - Total: 739
- Time zone: UTC+3:30 (IRST)
  - Summer (DST): UTC+4:30 (IRDT)

Rashmijan (Persian: رشميجان, also Romanized as Rashmījān; also known as Rashmījān-e Kalāntarī) is a village in Kenareh Rural District, in the Central District of Marvdasht County, Fars province, Iran. At the 2006 census, its population was 739, in 173 families.
