= Mansurabad-e Bala =

Mansurabad-e Bala (Persian: منصورابادبالا) may refer to:

- Mansurabad-e Bala, Fars
- Mansurabad-e Bala, Kohgiluyeh and Boyer-Ahmad
