= Garmabad =

Garmabad (Persian: گرم اباد) may refer to:

- Garmabad, Fars
- Garmabad, Ilam
