= Qaleh-ye Doktar Omad =

Qaleh-ye Doktar Omad قلعه دكترعماد
- Village
- Country: Iran
- Province: Fars
- County: Marvdasht
- Bakhsh: Central
- Rural District: Mohammadabad

Population (2006)
  - Total: 18
- Time zone: UTC+3:30 (IRST)
  - Summer (DST): UTC+4:30 (IRDT)

Qaleh-ye Doktar Omad (Persian: قلعه دكترعماد, also Romanized as Qal‘eh-ye Doktar 'Omād) is a village in Mohammadabad Rural District, in the Central District of Marvdasht County, Fars province, Iran. At the 2006 census, its population was 18, in 4 families.
