= Razmgah =

Razmgah (Persian: رزمگاه) may refer to:

- Razmgah-e Olya
- Razmgah-e Sofla
