= Narkuh =

Narkuh ناركوه
- Village
- Location within Iran
- Coordinates: 28°36′21″N 55°14′47″E
- Country: Iran
- Province: Fars
- County: Darab
- Bakhsh: Rostaq
- Rural District: Kuhestan

Population (2006)
  - Total: 34
- Time zone: UTC+3:30 (IRST)
  - Summer (DST): UTC+4:30 (IRDT)

Narkuh (Persian: ناركوه, also Romanized as Nārkūh; also known as Nārkū) is a village in Kuhestan Rural District, Rostaq District, Darab County, Fars province, Iran. At the 2006 census, its population was 34, in 9 families.
