= Olang Pasheh =

Olang Pasheh النگ پشه
- Village
- Location within Iran
- Coordinates: 35°49′28″N 60°12′05″E
- Country: Iran
- Province: Razavi Khorasan
- County: Fariman
- Bakhsh: Qalandarabad
- Rural District: Sefid Sang

Population (2006)
  - Total: 59
- Time zone: UTC+3:30 (IRST)
  - Summer (DST): UTC+4:30 (IRDT)

Olang Pasheh (Persian: النگ پشه) is a village in Sefid Sang Rural District, Qalandarabad District, Fariman County, Razavi Khorasan Province, Iran. At the 2006 census its population was 59, in 13 families.
