= Nahr-e Hasan =

Village in Fars, Iran

Nahr-e Hasan نهرحسن
- Village
- Location within Iran
- Coordinates: 28°39′43″N 55°13′17″E
- Country: Iran
- Province: Fars
- County: Darab
- Bakhsh: Rostaq
- Rural District: Kuhestan

Population (2006)
  - Total: 26
- Time zone: UTC+3:30 (IRST)
  - Summer (DST): UTC+4:30 (IRDT)

Nahr-e Hasan (Persian: نهرحسن, also Romanized as Nahr-e Ḩasan; also known as Nahr-e Ḩoseyn) is a village in Kuhestan Rural District, Rostaq District, Darab County, Fars province, Iran. At the 2006 census, its population was 26, in 5 families.
