= Shahan-e Garmab =

Shahan-e Garmab شاهان گرماب
- Village
- Location within Iran
- Coordinates: 35°47′26″N 60°11′35″E
- Country: Iran
- Province: Razavi Khorasan
- County: Fariman
- Bakhsh: Qalandarabad
- Rural District: Sefid Sang

Population (2006)
  - Total: 47
- Time zone: UTC+3:30 (IRST)
  - Summer (DST): UTC+4:30 (IRDT)

Shahan-e Garmab (Persian: شاهان گرماب, also Romanized as Shāhān-e Garmāb, Shāhān Garm Āb, and Shāhān-i-Garmāb; also known as Sha‘bān Garmāb) is a village in Sefid Sang Rural District, Qalandarabad District, Fariman County, Razavi Khorasan Province, Iran. At the 2006 census, its population was 47, in 11 families.
