= Shahrak-e Vali-ye Asr, Marvdasht =

Shahrak-e Vali-ye Asr شهرك ولي عصر
- Village
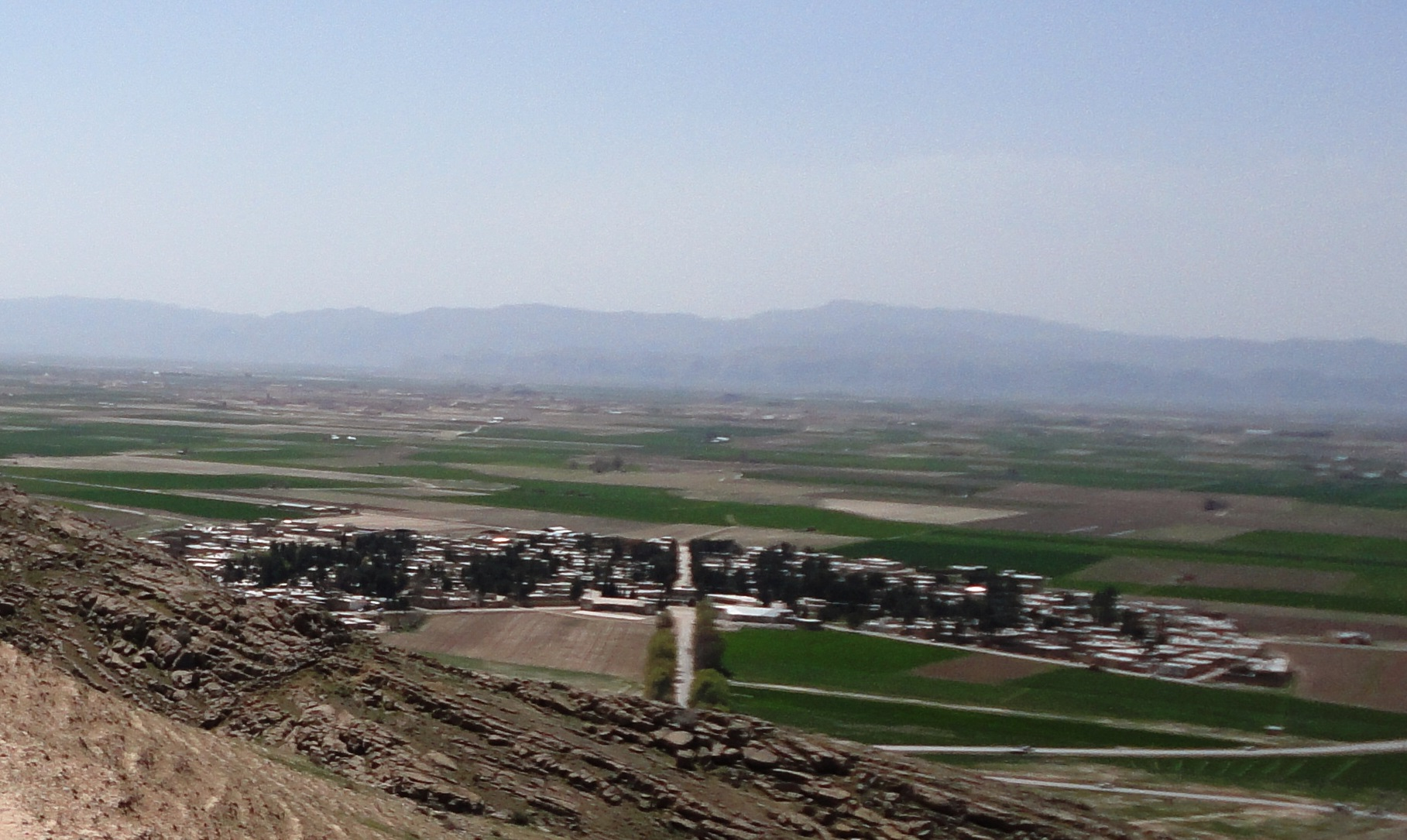

- Location within Iran
- Coordinates: 29°55′18″N 52°53′25″E
- Country: Iran
- Province: Fars
- County: Marvdasht
- Bakhsh: Central
- Rural District: Kenareh

Population (2006)
  - Total: 1,279
- Time zone: UTC+3:30 (IRST)
  - Summer (DST): UTC+4:30 (IRDT)

Shahrak-e Vali-ye Asr (Persian: شهرك ولي عصر, also Romanized as Shahrak-e Valī-ye 'Aşr) is a village in Kenareh Rural District, in the Central District of Marvdasht County, Fars province, Iran. At the 2006 census, its population was 1,279, in 341 families.
