= Shahrak-e Vali-ye Asr, Darab =

Shahrak-e Vali-ye Asr شهرك وليعصر
- Village
- Location within Iran
- Coordinates: 28°29′59″N 54°59′06″E
- Country: Iran
- Province: Fars
- County: Darab
- Bakhsh: Rostaq
- Rural District: Rostaq

Population (2006)
  - Total: 1,769
- Time zone: UTC+3:30 (IRST)
  - Summer (DST): UTC+4:30 (IRDT)

Shahrak-e Vali-ye Asr (Persian: شهرك وليعصر, also Romanized as Shahrak-e Valī-ye 'Aşr) is a village in Rostaq Rural District, Rostaq District, Darab County, Fars province, Iran. At the 2006 census, its population was 1,769, in 463 families.
