= Mansurabad, Marvdasht =

Mansurabad منصوراباد
- Village
- Location within Iran
- Coordinates: 29°57′04″N 52°36′30″E
- Country: Iran
- Province: Fars
- County: Marvdasht
- Bakhsh: Central
- Rural District: Majdabad

Population (2006)
  - Total: 127
- Time zone: UTC+3:30 (IRST)
  - Summer (DST): UTC+4:30 (IRDT)

Mansurabad (Persian: منصوراباد, also Romanized as Manşūrābād; also known as Manşūrābād-e Eyzadī, Manşūrābād-e Rāmjerd, and Sākhtemān Manşūrābād) is a village in Majdabad Rural District, in the Central District of Marvdasht County, Fars province, Iran. At the 2006 census, its population was 127, in 31 families.
