= Masumabad, Marvdasht =

Masumabad معصوم اباد
- Village
- Location within Iran
- Coordinates: 30°00′35″N 52°46′06″E
- Country: Iran
- Province: Fars
- County: Marvdasht
- Bakhsh: Central
- Rural District: Rudbal

Population (2006)
  - Total: 390
- Time zone: UTC+3:30 (IRST)
  - Summer (DST): UTC+4:30 (IRDT)

Masumabad (Persian: معصوم اباد, also Romanized as Ma‘şūmābād; also known as Manşūrābād) is a village in Rudbal Rural District, in the Central District of Marvdasht County, Fars province, Iran. At the 2006 census, its population was 390, in 106 families.
