= Cheshmeh Gandab =

Cheshmeh Gandab (Persian: چشمه گنداب) may refer to:

- Cheshmeh Gandab, Hamadan
- Cheshmeh Gandab, Razavi Khorasan
