= Hoseynabad-e Rekhneh Gol =

Village in Razavi Khorasan province, Iran

Hoseynabad-e Rekhneh Gol Persian: حسين اباد رخنه گل
- Village
- Location within Iran
- Coordinates: 35°32′38″N 60°04′56″E
- Country: Iran
- Province: Razavi Khorasan
- County: Fariman
- District: Qalandarabad
- Rural District: Qalandarabad

Population (2016)
  - Total: 1,458
- Time zone: UTC+3:30 (IRST)

Hoseynabad-e Rekhneh Gol (Persian: حسين اباد رخنه گل) (Note: Also romanized as Ḩoseynābād-e Rekhneh Gol; also known as Ḩoseynābād-e Rekhneh and Rekhneh) is a village in Qalandarabad Rural District of Qalandarabad District in Fariman County, Razavi Khorasan province, Iran.

== Demographics ==
=== Population ===
At the time of the 2006 National Census, the village's population was 1,296 in 286 households. The following census in 2011 counted 1,340 people in 336 households. The 2016 census measured the population of the village as 1,458 people in 399 households.
