= Dasht-e Mil-e Sofla =

Dasht-e Mil-e Sofla دشت ميل سفلي
- Village
- Country: Iran
- Province: Fars
- County: Darab
- Bakhsh: Rostaq
- Rural District: Rostaq

Population (2006)
  - Total: 21
- Time zone: UTC+3:30 (IRST)
  - Summer (DST): UTC+4:30 (IRDT)

Dasht-e Mil-e Sofla (Persian: دشت ميل سفلي, also Romanized as Dasht-e Mīl-e Soflá) is a village in Rostaq Rural District, Rostaq District, Darab County, Fars province, Iran. At the 2006 census, its population was 21, in 4 families.
