= Razmgah-e Sofla =

Razmgah-e Sofla رزمگاه سفلي
- Village
- Location within Iran
- Coordinates: 35°46′23″N 60°15′24″E
- Country: Iran
- Province: Razavi Khorasan
- County: Fariman
- Bakhsh: Qalandarabad
- Rural District: Sefid Sang

Population (2006)
  - Total: 37
- Time zone: UTC+3:30 (IRST)
  - Summer (DST): UTC+4:30 (IRDT)

Razmgah-e Sofla (Persian: رزمگاه سفلي, also Romanized as Razmgāh-e Soflá; also known as Razmgāh-e Pā’īn) is a village in Sefid Sang Rural District, Qalandarabad District, Fariman County, Razavi Khorasan Province, Iran. At the 2006 census, its population was 37, in 10 families.
