= Majdabad, Marvdasht =

Village in Fars province, Iran

Majdabad Persian: مجداباد
- Village
- Location within Iran
- Coordinates: 29°55′07″N 52°39′53″E
- Country: Iran
- Province: Fars
- County: Marvdasht
- District: Central
- Rural District: Majdabad

Population (2016)
  - Total: 3,353
- Time zone: UTC+3:30 (IRST)

Majdabad (Persian: مجداباد) (Note: Also romanized as Majdābād) is a village in, and the capital of, Majdabad Rural District of the Central District of Marvdasht County, Fars province, Iran.

== Demographics ==
=== Population ===
At the time of the 2006 National Census, the village's population was 3,143 in 695 households. The following census in 2011 counted 3,184 people in 811 households. The 2016 census measured the population of the village as 3,353 people in 894 households. It was the most populous village in its rural district.
