= Arreh Kamar =

Village in Razavi Khorasan province, Iran

Arreh Kamar Persian: اره كمر
- Village
- Location within Iran
- Coordinates: 35°29′17″N 59°50′00″E
- Country: Iran
- Province: Razavi Khorasan
- County: Fariman
- District: Qalandarabad
- Rural District: Qalandarabad

Population (2016)
  - Total: 200
- Time zone: UTC+3:30 (IRST)

Arreh Kamar (Persian: اره كمر) is a village in Qalandarabad Rural District of Qalandarabad District in Fariman County, Razavi Khorasan province, Iran.

== Demographics ==
=== Population ===
At the time of the 2006 National Census, the village's population was 252 in 61 households. The following census in 2011 counted 169 people in 49 households. The 2016 census measured the population of the village as 200 people in 58 households.
