= Mohammadabad, Marvdasht =

Village in Fars province, Iran

Mohammadabad Persian: محمد اباد
- Village
- Location within Iran
- Coordinates: 29°53′02″N 52°54′59″E
- Country: Iran
- Province: Fars
- County: Marvdasht
- District: Central
- Rural District: Mohammadabad

Population (2016)
  - Total: 573
- Time zone: UTC+3:30 (IRST)

Mohammadabad (Persian: محمد اباد) (Note: Also romanized as Moḩammadābād) is a village in, and the capital of, Mohammadabad Rural District of the Central District of Marvdasht County, Fars province, Iran.

== Demographics ==
=== Population ===
At the time of the 2006 National Census, the village's population was 1,038 in 292 households. The following census in 2011 counted 823 people in 241 households. The 2016 census measured the population of the village as 573 people in 180 households.
