= Mohammadabad-e Sar Cheshmeh Berashk =

Village in Razavi Khorasan province, Iran

Mohammadabad-e Sar Cheshmeh Berashk Persian: محمدابادسرچشمه براشك
- Village
- Location within Iran
- Coordinates: 35°42′05″N 60°22′48″E
- Country: Iran
- Province: Razavi Khorasan
- County: Fariman
- District: Qalandarabad
- Rural District: Sefid Sang

Population (2016)
  - Total: 126
- Time zone: UTC+3:30 (IRST)

Mohammadabad-e Sar Cheshmeh Berashk (Persian: محمدابادسرچشمه براشك) (Note: Also romanized as Moḩammadābād-e Sar Cheshmeh Berāshk; also known as Mohammad Ābād, Moḩammadābād-e Sar Cheshmeh, Sar Chashmeh, Sar Cheshmeh, Sar Cheshmeh Berāshk, and Sar-i-Chashmeh) is a village in Sefid Sang Rural District of Qalandarabad District, Fariman County, Razavi Khorasan province, Iran.

== Demographics ==
=== Population ===
At the time of the 2006 National Census, the village's population was 88 in 21 households. The following census in 2011 counted 113 people in 28 households. The 2016 census measured the population of the village as 126 people in 30 households.
