= Kamar Zard, Razavi Khorasan =

Kamar Zard كمرزرد
- Village
- Location within Iran
- Coordinates: 35°48′34″N 60°11′52″E
- Country: Iran
- Province: Razavi Khorasan
- County: Fariman
- Bakhsh: Qalandarabad
- Rural District: Sefid Sang

Population (2006)
  - Total: 38
- Time zone: UTC+3:30 (IRST)
  - Summer (DST): UTC+4:30 (IRDT)

Kamar Zard (Persian: كمرزرد; also known as Kamar Zard-e Shāhān and Qamrzard) is a village in Sefid Sang Rural District, Qalandarabad District, Fariman County, Razavi Khorasan Province, Iran. At the 2006 census, its population was 38, in 10 families.
