= Dasht-e Soltanabad-e Chahar =

Dasht-e Soltanabad-e Chahar دشت سلطان اباد4
- Village
- Country: Iran
- Province: Fars
- County: Darab
- Bakhsh: Rostaq
- Rural District: Kuhestan

Population (2006)
  - Total: 61
- Time zone: UTC+3:30 (IRST)
  - Summer (DST): UTC+4:30 (IRDT)

Dasht-e Soltanabad-e Chahar (Persian: دشت سلطان اباد4, also Romanized as Dasht-e Solţānābād-e Chahār) is a village in Kuhestan Rural District, Rostaq District, Darab County, Fars province, Iran. At the 2006 census, its population was 61, in 13 families.
