= Hajjiabad, Marvdasht =

Village in Fars province, Iran

Hajjiabad Persian: حاجي اباد
- Village
- Location within Iran
- Coordinates: 29°59′28″N 52°55′20″E
- Country: Iran
- Province: Fars
- County: Marvdasht
- District: Central
- Rural District: Naqsh-e Rostam

Population (2016)
  - Total: 1,777
- Time zone: UTC+3:30 (IRST)

Hajjiabad (Persian: حاجي اباد) (Note: Also romanized as Ḩājīābād and Ḩājjīābād; also known as Haji Abad Khafrak and Ḩajjīābād-e Khafrak) is a village in, and the capital of, Naqsh-e Rostam Rural District of the Central District of Marvdasht County, Fars province, Iran. The previous capital of the rural district was the village of Zangiabad, now a city.

== Demographics ==
=== Population ===
At the time of the 2006 National Census, the village's population was 1,781 in 429 households. The following census in 2011 counted 2,030 people in 499 households. The 2016 census measured the population of the village as 1,777 people in 525 households.
