= Kariz-e Hajj Mohammad Jan =

Village in Razavi Khorasan province, Iran

Kariz-e Hajj Mohammad Jan Persian: كاريز حاج محمد جان
- Village
- Location within Iran
- Coordinates: 35°38′40″N 60°10′32″E
- Country: Iran
- Province: Razavi Khorasan
- County: Fariman
- District: Qalandarabad
- Rural District: Sefid Sang

Population (2016)
  - Total: 1,821
- Time zone: UTC+3:30 (IRST)

Kariz-e Hajj Mohammad Jan (Persian: كاريز حاج محمد جان) (Note: Also romanized as Kārīz-e Ḩājj Moḩammad Jān; also known as Kalāt-e Moḩammad Jān, Kalāt-i-Muhammad Jān, Kariz Haji Mohammad Jan, Kārīz-e Ḩājj Moḩammad, Kārīz-e Ḩājjī Moḩammad Jān, Kārīz-e Jāmī-ye Moḩammad Jān, and Kārīz-e Moḩammad Jān) is a village in Sefid Sang Rural District of Qalandarabad District, Fariman County, Razavi Khorasan province, Iran.

== Demographics ==
=== Population ===
At the time of the 2006 National Census, the village's population was 1,438 in 330 households. The following census in 2011 counted 1,668 people in 419 households. The 2016 census measured the population of the village as 1,821 people in 512 households, the most populous in its rural district.
