= Baratabad =

Village in Razavi Khorasan province, Iran

Baratabad Persian: برات اباد
- Village
- Location within Iran
- Coordinates: 35°34′47″N 60°08′35″E
- Country: Iran
- Province: Razavi Khorasan
- County: Fariman
- District: Qalandarabad
- Rural District: Sefid Sang

Population (2016)
  - Total: 215
- Time zone: UTC+3:30 (IRST)

Baratabad (Persian: برات اباد) (Note: Also romanized as Barātābād; also known as Kalāteh-ye Karbalā’ī Barāt) is a village in Sefid Sang Rural District of Qalandarabad District, Fariman County, Razavi Khorasan province, Iran.

== Demographics ==
=== Population ===
At the time of the 2006 National Census, the village's population was 197 in 49 households. The following census in 2011 counted 159 people in 46 households. The 2016 census measured the population of the village as 215 people in 61 households.
