= Telgerd =

Village in Razavi Khorasan province, Iran

Telgerd Persian: تلگرد
- Village
- Location within Iran
- Coordinates: 35°33′53″N 59°56′13″E
- Country: Iran
- Province: Razavi Khorasan
- County: Fariman
- District: Qalandarabad
- Rural District: Qalandarabad

Population (2016)
  - Total: 192
- Time zone: UTC+3:30 (IRST)

Telgerd (Persian: تلگرد) is a village in Qalandarabad Rural District of Qalandarabad District in Fariman County, Razavi Khorasan province, Iran.

== Demographics ==
=== Population ===
At the time of the 2006 National Census, the village's population was 180 in 43 households. The following census in 2011 counted 184 people in 48 households. The 2016 census measured the population of the village as 192 people in 53 households.
