= Do Qaleh =

Do Qaleh (Persian: دوقلعه) may refer to:

- Do Qaleh, Hamadan
- Do Qaleh, Razavi Khorasan
