= Estakhr, Fars =

Estakhr استخر
- Village
- Location within Iran
- Coordinates: 28°30′13″N 55°25′36″E
- Country: Iran
- Province: Fars
- County: Darab
- Bakhsh: Rostaq
- Rural District: Kuhestan

Population (2006)
  - Total: 148
- Time zone: UTC+3:30 (IRST)
  - Summer (DST): UTC+4:30 (IRDT)

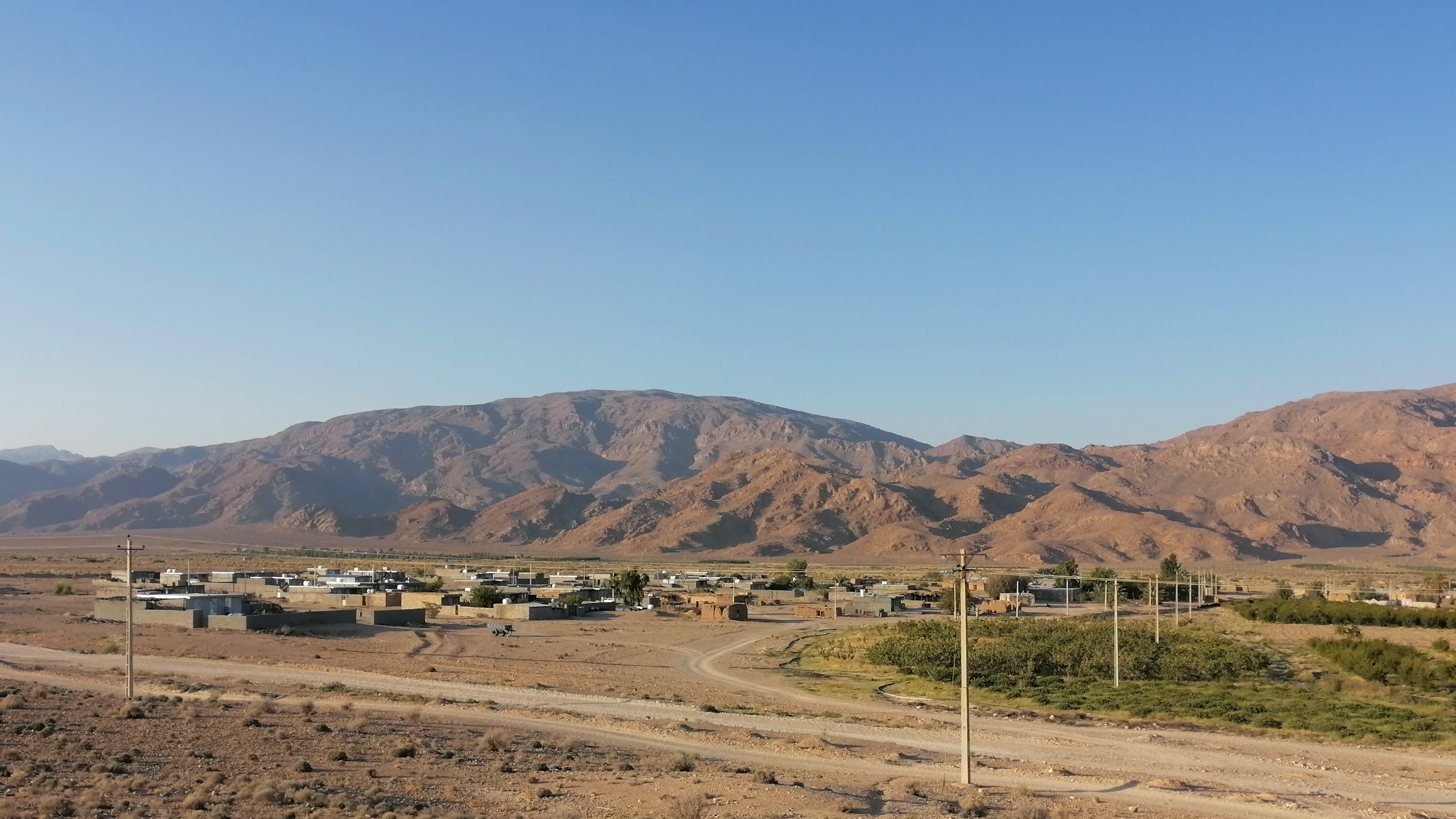
Estakhr

Estakhr (Persian: استخر; also known as Estakhr-e 'Olyā) is a village in Kuhestan Rural District, Rostaq District, Darab County, Fars province, Iran. At the 2006 census, its population was 148, in 33 families.
