= Ramjerd Rural District =

Ramjerd Rural District (Persian: دهستان رامجرد) may refer to:

- Ramjerd 1 Rural District
- Ramjerd 2 Rural District
