= Dasht-e Soltanabad-e Yek =

Dasht-e Soltanabad-e Yek دشت سلطان اباد1
- Village
- Location within Iran
- Coordinates: 28°35′51″N 55°19′17″E
- Country: Iran
- Province: Fars
- County: Darab
- Bakhsh: Rostaq
- Rural District: Kuhestan

Population (2006)
  - Total: 212
- Time zone: UTC+3:30 (IRST)
  - Summer (DST): UTC+4:30 (IRDT)

Dasht-e Soltanabad-e Yek (Persian: دشت سلطان اباد1, also Romanized as Dasht-e Solţānābād-e Yek; also known as Dasht-e Solţānābād) is a village in Kuhestan Rural District, Rostaq District, Darab County, Fars province, Iran. At the 2006 census, its population was 212, in 45 families.
