= Qasemabad-e Sarui =

Qasemabad-e Sarui قاسم ابادساروئي
- Village
- Location within Iran
- Coordinates: 30°02′37″N 52°50′00″E
- Country: Iran
- Province: Fars
- County: Marvdasht
- Bakhsh: Central
- Rural District: Naqsh-e Rostam

Population (2006)
  - Total: 1,953
- Time zone: UTC+3:30 (IRST)
  - Summer (DST): UTC+4:30 (IRDT)

Qasemabad-e Sarui (Persian: قاسم ابادساروئي, also Romanized as Qāsemābād-e Sārū’ī; also known as Qāsemābād, Sārū', Sārū’ī, and Sārū’īyeh) is a village in Naqsh-e Rostam Rural District, in the Central District of Marvdasht County, Fars province, Iran. At the 2006 census, its population was 1,953, in 462 families.
