= Kamar Zard, Fars =

Kamar Zard كمرزرد
- Village
- Location within Iran
- Coordinates: 29°56′43″N 52°38′06″E
- Country: Iran
- Province: Fars
- County: Marvdasht
- Bakhsh: Central
- Rural District: Majdabad

Population (2006)
  - Total: 354
- Time zone: UTC+3:30 (IRST)
  - Summer (DST): UTC+4:30 (IRDT)

Kamar Zard (Persian: كمرزرد, also Romanized as Kamar-e Zard; also known as Kamar-e Zard-e Rāmjerd and Kamar Zard Ramjerd) is a village in Majdabad Rural District, in the Central District of Marvdasht County, Fars province, Iran. At the 2006 census, its population was 354, in 74 families.
