= Cheshmeh-ye Sang Band (2) =

Cheshmeh-ye Sang Band چشمه سنگ بند
- Village
- Country: Iran
- Province: Fars
- County: Marvdasht
- Bakhsh: Central
- Rural District: Mohammadabad

Population (2006)
  - Total: 48
- Time zone: UTC+3:30 (IRST)
  - Summer (DST): UTC+4:30 (IRDT)

Cheshmeh-ye Sang Band (Persian: چشمه سنگ بند) is a village in Mohammadabad Rural District, in the Central District of Marvdasht County, Fars province, Iran. At the 2006 census, its population was 48, in 9 families.
