= Chahar Takab =

Village in Razavi Khorasan province, Iran

Chahar Takab Persian: چهارتكاب
- Village
- Location within Iran
- Coordinates: 35°29′56″N 59°53′16″E
- Country: Iran
- Province: Razavi Khorasan
- County: Fariman
- District: Qalandarabad
- Rural District: Qalandarabad

Population (2016)
  - Total: 278
- Time zone: UTC+3:30 (IRST)

Chahar Takab (Persian: چهارتكاب) (Note: Also romanized as Chahār Takāb; also known as Chahār Ţāq and Chehār Tāgu) is a village in Qalandarabad Rural District of Qalandarabad District in Fariman County, Razavi Khorasan province, Iran.

== Demographics ==
=== Population ===
At the time of the 2006 National Census, the village's population was 238 in 61 households. The following census in 2011 counted 255 people in 73 households. The 2016 census measured the population of the village as 278 people in 84 households.
