= Maqsudabad, Rudbal =

Maqsudabad مقصوداباد
- Village
- Location within Iran
- Coordinates: 30°01′51″N 52°46′46″E
- Country: Iran
- Province: Fars
- County: Marvdasht
- Bakhsh: Central
- Rural District: Rudbal

Population (2006)
  - Total: 65
- Time zone: UTC+3:30 (IRST)
  - Summer (DST): UTC+4:30 (IRDT)

Maqsudabad (Persian: مقصوداباد, also Romanized as Maqşūdābād; also known as Maqşūdābād-e Tol-e Yāsūlī) is a village in Rudbal Rural District, in the Central District of Marvdasht County, Fars province, Iran. At the 2006 census, its population was 65, in 20 families.
