= Lay Zangan =

Village in Fars province, Iran

Lay Zangan Persian: لاي زنگان
- Village
- Location within Iran
- Coordinates: 28°40′26″N 54°59′05″E
- Country: Iran
- Province: Fars
- County: Darab
- District: Rostaq
- Rural District: Rostaq

Population (2016)
  - Total: 1,999
- Time zone: UTC+3:30 (IRST)

Lay Zangan (Persian: لاي زنگان) (Note: Also romanized as Lāy Zangān and Lāy-e Zangān) is a village in, and the capital of, Rostaq Rural District of Rostaq District, Darab County, Fars province, Iran. The previous capital of the rural district was the village of Rostaq, now a city.

== Demographics ==
=== Population ===
At the time of the 2006 National Census, the village's population was 2,429 in 614 households. The following census in 2011 counted 2,145 people in 624 households. The 2016 census measured the population of the village as 1,999 people in 639 households.
