= Sud Khor =

Sud Khor سودخر
- Village
- Location within Iran
- Coordinates: 35°30′44″N 60°01′30″E
- Country: Iran
- Province: Razavi Khorasan
- County: Fariman
- Bakhsh: Qalandarabad
- Rural District: Qalandarabad

Population (2006)
  - Total: 91
- Time zone: UTC+3:30 (IRST)
  - Summer (DST): UTC+4:30 (IRDT)

Sud Khor (Persian: سودخر, also Romanized as Sūd Khor; also known as Galā'm and Sūd Khvor) is a village in Qalandarabad Rural District, Qalandarabad District, Fariman County, Razavi Khorasan Province, Iran. At the 2006 census, its population was 91, in 22 families.
