= Tall Bargah =

Village in Fars province, Iran

Tall Bargah Persian: تل بارگاه
- Village
- Location within Iran
- Coordinates: 28°33′44″N 55°20′05″E
- Country: Iran
- Province: Fars
- County: Darab
- District: Rostaq
- Rural District: Kuhestan

Population (2016)
  - Total: 662
- Time zone: UTC+3:30 (IRST)

Tall Bargah (Persian: تل بارگاه) (Note: Also romanized as Tal Bārgāh, Tall Bārgāh, and Tol Bārgāh; also known as Nūl Bargā, Tūl Bargeh, and Tulbargāh) is a village in, and the capital of, Kuhestan Rural District of Rostaq District, Darab County, Fars province, Iran.

== Demographics ==
=== Population ===
At the time of the 2006 National Census, the village's population was 455 in 107 households. The following census in 2011 counted 571 people in 149 households. The 2016 census measured the population of the village as 662 people in 197 households.
