= Alghur =

Village in Razavi Khorasan province, Iran

Alghur Persian: الغور
- Village
- Location within Iran
- Coordinates: 35°41′38″N 60°28′06″E
- Country: Iran
- Province: Razavi Khorasan
- County: Fariman
- District: Qalandarabad
- Rural District: Sefid Sang

Population (2016)
  - Total: 257
- Time zone: UTC+3:30 (IRST)

Alghur (Persian: الغور) (Note: Also romanized as Alghūr; also known as Alqūr, Qara Angūr, and Qareh Angūr) is a village in Sefid Sang Rural District of Qalandarabad District, Fariman County, Razavi Khorasan province, Iran.

== Demographics ==
=== Population ===
At the time of the 2006 National Census, the village's population was 206 in 40 households. The following census in 2011 counted 249 people in 52 households. The 2016 census measured the population of the village as 257 people in 59 households.
