= Rejaabad =

Village in Fars province, Iran

Rejaabad Persian: رجااباد
- Village
- Location within Iran
- Coordinates: 29°50′46″N 52°52′34″E
- Country: Iran
- Province: Fars
- County: Marvdasht
- District: Central
- Rural District: Mohammadabad

Population (2016)
  - Total: 1,526
- Time zone: UTC+3:30 (IRST)

Rejaabad (Persian: رجااباد) (Note: Also romanized as Rejāābād; also known as Rijāābād) is a village in Mohammadabad Rural District of the Central District of Marvdasht County, Fars province, Iran.

== Demographics ==
=== Population ===
At the time of the 2006 National Census, the village's population was 1,502 in 359 households. The following census in 2011 counted 1,521 people in 423 households. The 2016 census measured the population of the village as 1,526 people in 450 households. It was the most populous village in its rural district.
