= Shahrak-e Isar, Darab =

Village in Fars province, Iran

Shahrak-e Isar Persian: شهرك ايثار
- Village
- Location within Iran
- Coordinates: 28°35′29″N 55°18′30″E
- Country: Iran
- Province: Fars
- County: Darab
- District: Rostaq
- Rural District: Kuhestan

Population (2016)
  - Total: 1,680
- Time zone: UTC+3:30 (IRST)

Shahrak-e Isar (Persian: شهرك ايثار,) (Note: Also romanized as Shahrak-e Īs̄ār) is a village in Kuhestan Rural District of Rostaq District, Darab County, Fars province, Iran.

== Demographics ==
=== Population ===
At the time of the 2006 National Census, the village's population was 866 in 200 households. The following census in 2011 counted 1,180 people in 327 households. The 2016 census measured the population of the village as 1,680 people in 495 households. It was the most populous village in its rural district.
