= Maqsudabad, Mohammadabad =

Maqsudabad مقصوداباد
- Village
- Location within Iran
- Coordinates: 29°50′11″N 52°59′19″E
- Country: Iran
- Province: Fars
- County: Marvdasht
- Bakhsh: Central
- Rural District: Mohammadabad

Population (2006)
  - Total: 474
- Time zone: UTC+3:30 (IRST)
  - Summer (DST): UTC+4:30 (IRDT)

Maqsudabad (Persian: مقصوداباد, also Romanized as Maqşūdābād) is a village in Mohammadabad Rural District, in the Central District of Marvdasht County, Fars province, Iran. At the 2006 census, its population was 474, in 112 families.
