= Kuh Sabz =

Village in Fars province, Iran

Kuh Sabz Persian: كوه سبز
- Village
- Location within Iran
- Coordinates: 29°54′50″N 52°42′26″E
- Country: Iran
- Province: Fars
- County: Marvdasht
- District: Central
- Rural District: Ramjerd-e Yek

Population (2016)
  - Total: 2,871
- Time zone: UTC+3:30 (IRST)

Kuh Sabz (Persian: كوه سبز) (Note: Also romanized as Kooh Sabz, Kūh Sabz, and Kūh-e Sabz) is a village in, and the capital of, Ramjerd-e Yek Rural District of the Central District of Marvdasht County, Fars province, Iran.

== Demographics ==
=== Population ===
At the time of the 2006 National Census, the village's population was 2,906 in 652 households. The following census in 2011 counted 2,994 people in 788 households. The 2016 census measured the population of the village as 2,871 people in 801 households. It was the most populous village in its rural district.
