= Galam =

Galam may refer to:

- Galam Cennalath, king of the Picts
- Galam, Iran, a village in Razavi Khorasan Province, Iran
- The Kingdom of Galam, also known as Gajaaga, in what is now eastern Senegal
