= Do Shakh, Iran =

Do Shakh دوشاخ
- Village
- Country: Iran
- Province: Fars
- County: Darab
- Bakhsh: Rostaq
- Rural District: Rostaq

Population (2006)
  - Total: 45
- Time zone: UTC+3:30 (IRST)
  - Summer (DST): UTC+4:30 (IRDT)

Do Shakh (Persian: دوشاخ, also Romanized as Do Shākh) is a village in Rostaq Rural District, Rostaq District, Darab County, Fars province, Iran. At the 2006 census, its population was 45, in 9 families. Do Shakh is famous for being the sitze of a Roman tomb, thought to be built by Roman prisoners of war between 280 and 290.
