= Taqiabad, Fariman =

Village in Razavi Khorasan province, Iran

Taqiabad Persian: تقي اباد
- Village
- Location within Iran
- Coordinates: 35°37′58″N 59°51′12″E
- Country: Iran
- Province: Razavi Khorasan
- County: Fariman
- District: Qalandarabad
- Rural District: Qalandarabad

Population (2016)
  - Total: 2,023
- Time zone: UTC+3:30 (IRST)

Taqiabad (Persian: تقی‌آباد) (Note: Also romanized as Taqīābād) is a village in Qalandarabad Rural District of Qalandarabad District in Fariman County, Razavi Khorasan province, Iran.

== Demographics ==
=== Population ===
At the time of the 2006 National Census, the village's population was 1,685 in 377 households. The following census in 2011 counted 1,935 people in 516 households. The 2016 census measured the population of the village as 2,023 people in 566 households.
