= Goldasht-e Olya =

Goldasht-e Olya گلدشت عليا
- Village
- Location within Iran
- Coordinates: 29°53′01″N 52°38′22″E
- Country: Iran
- Province: Fars
- County: Marvdasht
- Bakhsh: Central
- Rural District: Majdabad

Population (2006)
  - Total: 1,246
- Time zone: UTC+3:30 (IRST)
  - Summer (DST): UTC+4:30 (IRDT)

Goldasht-e Olya (Persian: گلدشت عليا, also Romanized as Goldasht-e 'Olyā; also known as Gondāshlū, Gondāshlū Ja’farī, Gondeshlū-ye Bālā, Gondeshlū-ye Ja‘farī, and Gundashlu) is a village in Majdabad Rural District, in the Central District of Marvdasht County, Fars province, Iran. At the 2006 census, its population was 1,246, in 313 families.
