= Rostaq Rural District =

Rostaq Rural District (Persian: دهستان رستاق) may refer to:

- Rostaq Rural District (Darab County), in Fars province
- Rostaq Rural District (Neyriz County), in Fars province
- Rostaq Rural District (Markazi Province)
- Rostaq Rural District (Razavi Khorasan Province)
- Rostaq Rural District (Ashkezar County), in Yazd province
