= Garmabad, Fars =

Village in Fars province, Iran

Garmabad Persian: گرم اباد
- Village
- Location within Iran
- Coordinates: 30°03′40″N 52°48′14″E
- Country: Iran
- Province: Fars
- County: Marvdasht
- District: Central
- Rural District: Rudbal

Population (2016)
  - Total: 3,020
- Time zone: UTC+3:30 (IRST)

Garmabad (Persian: گرم اباد) (Note: Also romanized as Garmābād; also known as Jarmābād and Jarmābaq) is a village in, and the capital of, Rudbal Rural District of the Central District of Marvdasht County, Fars province, Iran. The previous capital of the rural district was the village of Fathabad, now a city.

== Demographics ==
=== Population ===
At the time of the 2006 National Census, the village's population was 2,826 in 665 households. The following census in 2011 counted 3,050 people in 819 households. The 2016 census measured the population of the village as 3,020 people in 888 households.
