= Goldasht-e Sofla =

Goldasht-e Sofla گلدشت سفلي
- Village
- Location within Iran
- Coordinates: 29°52′20″N 52°43′11″E
- Country: Iran
- Province: Fars
- County: Marvdasht
- Bakhsh: Central
- Rural District: Majdabad

Population (2006)
  - Total: 195
- Time zone: UTC+3:30 (IRST)
  - Summer (DST): UTC+4:30 (IRDT)

Goldasht-e Sofla (Persian: گلدشت سفلي, also Romanized as Goldasht-e Soflá; also known as Bondashlū Sarchasmeh, Bondashlū Sarcheshmeh, Gondashlū Sarchesmeh, Gondeshlū-ye Pā’īn, and Gondeshlū-ye Soflá) is a village in Majdabad Rural District, in the Central District of Marvdasht County, Fars province, Iran. At the 2006 census, its population was 195, in 43 families.
