= Qalandarabad =

City in Razavi Khorasan province, Iran

Qalandarabad Persian: قلندرآباد
- City
- Location within Iran
- Coordinates: 35°36′02″N 59°57′06″E
- Country: Iran
- Province: Razavi Khorasan
- County: Fariman
- District: Qalandarabad
- Established as a city: 2000

Population (2016)
  - Total: 4,880
- Time zone: UTC+3:30 (IRST)

Qalandarabad (Persian: قلندرآباد) (Note: Also romanized as Qalandarābād) is a city in, and the capital of, Qalandarabad District in Fariman County, Razavi Khorasan province, Iran. It also serves as the administrative center for Qalandarabad Rural District. The village of Qalandarabad was converted to a city in 2000.

== Demographics ==
=== Population ===
At the time of the 2006 National Census, the city's population was 4,872 in 1,168 households. The following census in 2011 counted 4,924 people in 1,360 households. The 2016 census measured the population of the city as 4,880 people in 1,406 households.
