= Do Qaleh-ye Berashk =

Village in Razavi Khorasan province, Iran

Do Qaleh-ye Berashk Persian: دوقلعه براشك
- Village
- Location within Iran
- Coordinates: 35°42′39″N 60°26′29″E
- Country: Iran
- Province: Razavi Khorasan
- County: Fariman
- District: Qalandarabad
- Rural District: Sefid Sang

Population (2016)
  - Total: 201
- Time zone: UTC+3:30 (IRST)

Do Qaleh-ye Berashk (Persian: دوقلعه براشك) (Note: Also romanized as Do Qal‘eh-ye Berāshk; also known as Do Qal‘eh, Do Qaleh-ye Berashk (دوقلعه برشك), Do Qaleh-ye Bereshk, Qal‘a Barāsh, and Qal‘eh Barāsh) is a village in Sefid Sang Rural District of Qalandarabad District, Fariman County, Razavi Khorasan province, Iran.

== Demographics ==
=== Population ===
At the time of the 2006 National Census, the village's population was 149 in 36 households. The population included 67 males and 82 females. Of the total population, 102 individuals were literate (47 males and 55 females), while 33 individuals were illiterate (13 males and 20 females). The following census in 2011 counted 194 people in 53 households. The 2016 census measured the population of the village as 201 people in 58 households.
