= Cheshmeh Gondeh =

Village in Razavi Khorasan province, Iran

Cheshmeh Gondeh Persian: چشمه گنده
- Village
- Location within Iran
- Coordinates: 35°42′36″N 60°03′21″E
- Country: Iran
- Province: Razavi Khorasan
- County: Fariman
- District: Qalandarabad
- Rural District: Sefid Sang

Population (2016)
  - Total: 138
- Time zone: UTC+3:30 (IRST)

Cheshmeh Gondeh (Persian: چشمه گنده) (Note: Also known as Cheshmeh Gandāb and Cheshmeh Ḩamzeh 'Alī) is a village in Sefid Sang Rural District of Qalandarabad District, Fariman County, Razavi Khorasan province, Iran.

== Demographics ==
=== Population ===
At the time of the 2006 National Census, the village's population was 134 in 25 households. The following census in 2011 counted 96 people in 28 households. The 2016 census measured the population of the village as 138 people in 37 households.
