= Fathabad, Marvdasht =

City in Fars province, Iran

Fathabad Persian: فتح اباد
- City
- Location within Iran
- Coordinates: 29°56′19″N 52°47′57″E
- Country: Iran
- Province: Fars
- County: Marvdasht
- District: Central

Population (2016)
  - Total: 4,739
- Time zone: UTC+3:30 (IRST)

Fathabad (Persian: فتح اباد) (Note: Also romanized as Fatḩābād; formerly Fathabad-e Sofla (فتح اباد سفلي), also romanized as Fatḩābād-e Soflá; also known as Fāteḩābād) is a city in the Central District of Marvdasht County, Fars province, Iran. As a village, it was the capital of Rudbal Rural District until its capital was transferred to the village of Garmabad.

== Demographics ==
=== Population ===
At the time of the 2006 National Census, Fathabad's population was 4,688 in 1,106 households, when it was the village of Fathabad-e Sofla in Rudbal Rural District. The following census in 2011 counted 4,795 people in 1,297 households. The 2016 census measured the population as 4,739 people in 1,359 households. It was the most populous village in its rural district.

After the census, Fathabad-e Sofla was elevated to city status as Fathabad.
