= Kateh Shamshir-e Sofla =

Village in Razavi Khorasan province, Iran

Kateh Shamshir-e Sofla Persian: كته شمشير سفلي
- Village
- Location within Iran
- Coordinates: 35°35′05″N 60°02′07″E
- Country: Iran
- Province: Razavi Khorasan
- County: Fariman
- District: Qalandarabad
- Rural District: Qalandarabad

Population (2016)
  - Total: 3,112
- Time zone: UTC+3:30 (IRST)

Kateh Shamshir-e Sofla (Persian: كته شمشيرسفلي) (Note: Also romanized as Kateh Shamshīr Soflá and Kateh Shamshīr-e Soflá; also known as Kateh Shamshīr and Katteh Shamshīr-e Pā’īn) is a village in Qalandarabad Rural District of Qalandarabad District in Fariman County, Razavi Khorasan province, Iran.

== Demographics ==
=== Population ===
At the time of the 2006 National Census, the village's population was 2,552 in 565 households. The following census in 2011 counted 2,980 people in 745 households. The 2016 census measured the population of the village as 3,112 people in 806 households, the most populous in its rural district.
