= Sefid Sang =

City in Razavi Khorasan province, Iran

Sefid Sang Persian: سفيدسنگ
- City
- Location within Iran
- Coordinates: 35°39′27″N 60°05′44″E
- Country: Iran
- Province: Razavi Khorasan
- County: Fariman
- District: Qalandarabad
- Established as a city: 2004

Population (2016)
  - Total: 6,129
- Time zone: UTC+3:30 (IRST)

Sefid Sang (Persian: سفيدسنگ) (Note: Also romanized as Sefīd Sang; also known as Safed Sang, Safīd Sagak, Sang-i-Sefīd, and Sefīd Sagak) is a city in Qalandarabad District of Fariman County, Razavi Khorasan province, Iran, serving as the administrative center for Sefid Sang Rural District. The village of Sefid Sang was converted to a city in 2004.

== Demographics ==
=== Population ===
At the time of the 2006 National Census, the city's population was 4,894 in 1,110 households. The following census in 2011 counted 5,545 people in 1,499 households. The 2016 census measured the population of the city as 6,129 people in 1,735 households.
