= Razmgah-e Olya =

Village in Razavi Khorasan province, Iran

Razmgah-e Olya Persian: رزمگاه عليا
- Village
- Location within Iran
- Coordinates: 35°43′34″N 60°17′31″E
- Country: Iran
- Province: Razavi Khorasan
- County: Fariman
- District: Qalandarabad
- Rural District: Sefid Sang

Population (2016)
  - Total: 124
- Time zone: UTC+3:30 (IRST)

Razmgah-e Olya (Persian: رزمگاه عليا) (Note: Also romanized as Razmgāh-e ‘Olyā; also known as Razmgāh and Razmgāh-e Bālā) is a village in Sefid Sang Rural District of Qalandarabad District, Fariman County, Razavi Khorasan province, Iran.

== Demographics ==
=== Population ===
At the time of the 2006 National Census, the village's population was 111 in 26 households. The following census in 2011 counted 106 people in 31 households. The 2016 census measured the population of the village as 124 people in 35 households.
