= Kenareh, Marvdasht =

Village in Fars province, Iran

Kenareh Persian: كناره
- Village
- Location within Iran
- Coordinates: 29°54′41″N 52°51′51″E
- Country: Iran
- Province: Fars
- County: Marvdasht
- District: Central
- Rural District: Kenareh

Population (2016)
  - Total: 6,571
- Time zone: UTC+3:30 (IRST)

Kenareh (Persian: كناره) (Note: Also romanized as Kenāreh; also known as Kināreh) is a village in, and the capital of, Kenareh Rural District of the Central District of Marvdasht County, Fars province, Iran.

== Demographics ==
=== Population ===
At the time of the 2006 National Census, the village's population was 6,853 in 1,742 households. The following census in 2011 counted 6,536 people in 1,885 households. The 2016 census measured the population of the village as 6,571 people in 2,033 households. It was the most populous village in its rural district.
