= Kateh Shamshir-e Olya =

Village in Razavi Khorasan province, Iran

Kateh Shamshir-e Olya Persian: كته شمشيرعليا
- Village
- Location within Iran
- Coordinates: 35°35′04″N 59°59′50″E
- Country: Iran
- Province: Razavi Khorasan
- County: Fariman
- District: Qalandarabad
- Rural District: Qalandarabad

Population (2016)
  - Total: 1,597
- Time zone: UTC+3:30 (IRST)

Kateh Shamshir-e Olya (Persian: كته شمشيرعليا) (Note: Also romanized as Kateh Shamshīr-e ‘Olyā; also known as Ḩājjī Sham Shīr, Kalāteh-ye Shamshīr Bālā, Kateh Shamshīr Bālā, Kateh Shamshīr-e Bālā, Kat-i-Shamshīr, Khachi Shamshīr, and Khachi Shamsīr) is a village in Qalandarabad Rural District of Qalandarabad District in Fariman County, Razavi Khorasan province, Iran.

== Demographics ==
=== Population ===
At the time of the 2006 National Census, the village's population was 1,516 in 336 households. The following census in 2011 counted 1,540 people in 387 households. The 2016 census measured the population of the village as 1,597 people in 446 households.
