= Zangiabad, Fars =

City in Fars province, Iran

Zangiabad Persian: زنگی اباد
- City
- Location within Iran
- Coordinates: 29°58′26″N 52°51′23″E
- Country: Iran
- Province: Fars
- County: Marvdasht
- District: Central

Population (2016)
  - Total: 4,273
- Time zone: UTC+3:30 (IRST)

Zangiabad (Persian: زنگي اباد) (Note: Also romanized as Zangīābād) is a city in the Central District of Marvdasht County, Fars province, Iran. As a village, it was the capital of Naqsh-e Rostam Rural District until its capital was transferred to the village of Hajjiabad.

== Demographics ==
=== Population ===
At the time of the 2006 National Census, Zangiabad's population was 3,588 in 840 households, when it was a village in Naqsh-e Rostam Rural District. The following census in 2011 counted 4,064 people in 1,159 households. The 2016 census measured the population as 4,273 people in 1,333 households. It was the most populous village in its rural district.

After the census, Zangiabad was elevated to the status of a city.
