= Sarus =

Sarus may refer to:

Germanic culture

- Sarus (Sörli), a son of the Norse mythological king, Jonakr
- Sarus (Serila), a semi-historic figure who, in the fourth century, on behalf of his sister Svanhildr, attacked Ermanaric, king of the Ostrogoths
- Sarus the Goth, a blood enemy and leading rival of Ataulf, king of the Visigoths, in the early fifth century

Other uses

- Sarus, Iran, a village in Mazandaran Province, Iran
- Sarus River, the ancient name of the Seyhan River in Adana Province (Cilicia), Turkey
- Sarus crane (Grus antigone), a large non-migratory crane
- Battle of Sarus, a battle fought in 625 between the East Roman (Byzantine) army, led by Emperor Heraclius, and the Persian general Shahrbaraz
- Aerocopter Sarus, a "mono-tilt-rotor rotary-ring" VTOL aircraft under development by Aerocopter Inc.
- Balázs Sarus (born 1988), Hungarian football player
