= Sarutobi =

Sarutobi may refer to:

- Sarutobi Sasuke, a character in Japanese children's stories
- Multiple characters are named Sarutobi in Naruto media
  - Hiruzen Sarutobi (Naruto) or Third Hokage
  - Asuma Sarutobi (Naruto)
  - Konohamaru Sarutobi (Naruto)
- Ayame Sarutobi (Gin Tama), a character in Gin Tama media

== See also ==
- Sarutobi Ecchan, a Japanese media franchise
- Saru (disambiguation)
