= Maqsudabad, Jahrom =

Maqsudabad مقصودآباد
- Village
- Country: Iran
- Province: Fars
- County: Jahrom
- Bakhsh: Central
- Rural District: Jolgah

Population (2016)
  - Total: 183
- Time zone: UTC+3:30 (IRST)
  - Summer (DST): UTC+4:30 (IRDT)

Maqsudabad (Persian: مقصودآباد) is a village in Jolgah Rural District, in the Central District of Jahrom County, Fars province, Iran. At the 2016 census, its population was 183, in 89 families.
