= Konareh-ye Rostam =

Konareh-ye Rostam كناره رستم
- Village
- Location within Iran
- Coordinates: 30°25′08″N 51°21′18″E
- Country: Iran
- Province: Fars
- County: Rostam
- Bakhsh: Sorna
- Rural District: Poshtkuh-e Rostam

Population (2006)
  - Total: 347
- Time zone: UTC+3:30 (IRST)
  - Summer (DST): UTC+4:30 (IRDT)

Konareh-ye Rostam (Persian: كناره رستم, also Romanized as Konāreh-ye Rostam; also known as Kenāreh and Konāreh) is a village in Poshtkuh-e Rostam Rural District, Sorna District, Rostam County, Fars province, Iran. At the 2006 census, its population was 347, in 76 families.
