= Do Shakh, Afghanistan =

Do Shakh
- Location in Afghanistan
- Coordinates: 35°24′18″N 68°59′51″E
- Country: Afghanistan
- Province: Baghlan Province
- Time zone: + 4.30

Do Shakh is a village in Baghlan Province in north eastern Afghanistan.

== See also ==
- Baghlan Province
