= Mansurabad-e Sofla =

Mansurabad-e Sofla منصورابادسفلي
- Village
- Location within Iran
- Coordinates: 30°20′58″N 51°21′46″E
- Country: Iran
- Province: Fars
- County: Rostam
- Bakhsh: Central
- Rural District: Rostam-e Do

Population (2006)
  - Total: 245
- Time zone: UTC+3:30 (IRST)
  - Summer (DST): UTC+4:30 (IRDT)

Mansurabad-e Sofla (Persian: منصورابادسفلي, also Romanized as Manşūrābād-e Soflá; also known as Manşūrābād-e Pā’īn) is a village in Rostam-e Do Rural District, in the Central District of Rostam County, Fars province, Iran. At the 2006 census, its population was 245, in 46 families.
