= Mansurabad, Rafsanjan =

Mansurabad منصوراباد
- Village
- Location within Iran
- Coordinates: 30°22′34″N 55°28′19″E
- Country: Iran
- Province: Kerman
- County: Rafsanjan
- Bakhsh: Koshkuiyeh
- Rural District: Raviz

Population (2006)
  - Total: 27
- Time zone: UTC+3:30 (IRST)
  - Summer (DST): UTC+4:30 (IRDT)

Mansurabad (Persian: منصوراباد, also Romanized as Manşūrābād) is a village in Raviz Rural District, Koshkuiyeh District, Rafsanjan County, Kerman Province, Iran. At the 2006 census, its population was 27, in 9 families.
