= Konaru, Hormozgan =

Konaru كنارو
- Village
- Location within Iran
- Coordinates: 27°18′50″N 56°07′56″E
- Country: Iran
- Province: Hormozgan
- County: Bandar Abbas
- Bakhsh: Central
- Rural District: Tazian

Population (2006)
  - Total: 1,336
- Time zone: UTC+3:30 (IRST)
  - Summer (DST): UTC+4:30 (IRDT)

Konaru (Persian: كنارو, also Romanized as Konārū and Konowru; also known as Kanarun and Konāreh) is a village in Tazian Rural District, in the Central District of Bandar Abbas County, Hormozgan Province, Iran. At the 2006 census, its population was 1,336, in 292 families.
