= Mansurabad-e Sarab Khamzan =

Mansurabad-e Sarab Khamzan منصورابادسراب خمزان
- Village
- Location within Iran
- Coordinates: 30°33′39″N 51°29′41″E
- Country: Iran
- Province: Kohgiluyeh and Boyer-Ahmad
- County: Boyer-Ahmad
- Bakhsh: Central
- Rural District: Dasht-e Rum

Population (2006)
  - Total: 811
- Time zone: UTC+3:30 (IRST)
  - Summer (DST): UTC+4:30 (IRDT)

Mansurabad-e Sarab Khamzan (Persian: منصورابادسراب خمزان, also Romanized as Manşūrābād-e Sarāb Khamzān; also known as Manşūrābād and Serowkhīzon) is a village in Dasht-e Rum Rural District, in the Central District of Boyer-Ahmad County, Kohgiluyeh and Boyer-Ahmad Province, Iran. At the 2006 census, its population was 811, in 166 families.
