= Maqsudabad, Mashhad =

Maqsudabad مقصوداباد
- Village
- Location within Iran
- Coordinates: 36°23′52″N 59°39′38″E
- Country: Iran
- Province: Razavi Khorasan
- County: Mashhad
- Bakhsh: Central
- Rural District: Tabadkan

Population (2006)
  - Total: 216
- Time zone: UTC+3:30 (IRST)
  - Summer (DST): UTC+4:30 (IRDT)

Maqsudabad (Persian: مقصوداباد, also Romanized as Maqşūdābād) is a village in Tabadkan Rural District, in the Central District of Mashhad County, Razavi Khorasan Province, Iran. At the 2006 census, its population was 216, in 61 families.
