= Estarkhi, Faruj =

Estarkhi اسطرخي
- Village
- Location within Iran
- Coordinates: 36°55′34″N 58°08′13″E
- Country: Iran
- Province: North Khorasan
- County: Faruj
- Bakhsh: Central
- Rural District: Sangar

Population (2006)
  - Total: 183
- Time zone: UTC+3:30 (IRST)
  - Summer (DST): UTC+4:30 (IRDT)

Estarkhi (Persian: اسطرخي, also Romanized as Esţarkhī; also known as Estakhrī) is a village in Sangar Rural District, in the Central District of Faruj County, North Khorasan Province, Iran. At the 2006 census, its population was 183, in 39 families.
