= Amirabad, Eslamabad-e Gharb =

Amirabad اميراباد
- Village
- Location within Iran
- Coordinates: 33°56′25″N 46°40′21″E
- Country: Iran
- Province: Kermanshah
- County: Eslamabad-e Gharb
- Bakhsh: Central
- Rural District: Howmeh-ye Jonubi

Population (2006)
  - Total: 1,219
- Time zone: UTC+3:30 (IRST)
  - Summer (DST): UTC+4:30 (IRDT)

Amirabad (Persian: اميراباد, also Romanized as Amīrābād; also known as Amīrābādkhān-e Manşūrī, Amīrābād Khān Manşūr, and Manşūrābād) is a village in Howmeh-ye Jonubi Rural District, in the Central District of Eslamabad-e Gharb County, Kermanshah Province, Iran. At the 2006 census, its population was 1,219, in 277 families.
