= Vezg-e Mansurabad =

Vezg-e Mansurabad وزگ منصوراباد
- Village
- Location within Iran
- Coordinates: 30°32′30″N 51°39′28″E
- Country: Iran
- Province: Kohgiluyeh and Boyer-Ahmad
- County: Boyer-Ahmad
- Bakhsh: Central
- Rural District: Sarrud-e Jonubi

Population (2006)
  - Total: 592
- Time zone: UTC+3:30 (IRST)
  - Summer (DST): UTC+4:30 (IRDT)

Vezg-e Mansurabad (Persian: وزگ منصوراباد, also Romanized as Vezg-e Manṣūrābād; also known as Manşūrābād, Vazag, and Vezg) is a village in Sarrud-e Jonubi Rural District, in the Central District of Boyer-Ahmad County, Kohgiluyeh and Boyer-Ahmad Province, Iran. At the 2006 census, its population was 592, in 132 families.
