= Mansurabad, Zeydabad =

Mansurabad منصوراباد
- Village
- Location within Iran
- Coordinates: 29°34′00″N 55°31′00″E
- Country: Iran
- Province: Kerman
- County: Sirjan
- Bakhsh: Central
- Rural District: Zeydabad

Population (2006)
  - Total: 33
- Time zone: UTC+3:30 (IRST)
  - Summer (DST): UTC+4:30 (IRDT)

Mansurabad (Persian: منصوراباد, also Romanized as Manşūrābād) is a village in Zeydabad Rural District, in the Central District of Sirjan County, Kerman Province, Iran. At the 2006 census, its population was 33, in 9 families.
