= Aerocopter Sarus =

Sarus and Kestrel
- The

General information
- Type: experimental "proof-of-concept" vehicle
- Manufacturer: AeroCopter Inc.
- Designer: Siamak Yassini and George Syrovy
- Status: under development
- Primary user: Commercial

History
- First flight: TBD

AeroCopter Inc. is a new venture backed by YAS Ventures LLC and two Entrepreneurs Siamak Yassini and George Syrovy and it is aimed at pioneering the third generation of airborne transportation.

== Overview ==
AeroCopter’s Sarus and Kestrel are Vertical Takeoff and Landing (VTOL) aircraft concepts that use Counter Rotating Co-Axial Twisted Rotor Blades technology. The aircraft are designed for point-to-point air transportation and aviation applications . The sarus is intended for commercial and private aviation markets,while the kestrel is developed for military and civilian Unmanned Aerial (UAV) applications . The designs are intended to support integration with emerging concepts such as small aircraft transportation system (SATS) and"highway in the sky" sir mobility system.

Technology Breakthrough: Counter-Rotating Mono-Tilt-Rotor (MTR) architecture Unique co-axial rotor configuration, Electronically controlled blade, Unified propulsion system for hover and cruise modes, Frictionless rotary ring utilizing Magnetic Levitation (MAGLEV) technology, Low cost maintenance and high reliability compared with existing Tiltrotor aircraft. Technology Advantages: Inherent stability and safety at all speeds and flight modes, No rotor synchronization, “Flywheel Effect” of stored energy, Thrust circularly distributed far from center of gravity, Less susceptibility to vortex ring states, Reduction in noise and pollution

Personal Air Vehicle (PAV): 2-4 passengers PAV, Very Light Jet – up to 8 passengers, Regional Jet replacement, Air Taxi/Limo Corporate/Executive Jet, SATS and Highway in the Sky compatible Increased passenger comfort and safety – vertical takeoff and landing are smoother, reduced risk of ground/mid-air collision, elimination of airport delays.

Unmanned Aerial Vehicle (UAV): Multi-mission capabilities, Front Line Delivery System, Exceeds FLDS requirements in range, payload, and speed, Answers the safety problem of Humvees and semi-trucks being easy targets for IEDs If targeted, results in zero casualties, Unmanned Combat Armed Rotorcraft, Intelligence, Surveillance, and Reconnaissance Strike/Suppression of Enemy Air Defense, Search and Rescue Civilian applications such as disaster relief, weather tracking, traffic monitoring.

== See also ==
- Mono tiltrotor

How does Electromagnetic (Permanent Magnet) Rotary Blade work? The ring consists of an electronically controlled blades mechanism. Basically, the electromagnets used in the inner ring use the power generated by the turbine engine via shafts. As the ring is spun-up by the shaft from the turbine engine and gears located on the outer ring, the blades pass through the various electromagnets via the shaft connected to the main blade. Connected to the end of this shaft is a permanent magnet. As the blade spins around and passes through each set of electromagnets, the electromagnet is charged with a specific current in order to produce a magnetic field. This field causes the blade to rotate to a specific angle, whereby if each electromagnet were set to this strength, the blade would stay at that angle the entire way around the ring (collective pitch). If, however, the electromagnets change at each location, the blade can be made to pitch differently at each degree, introducing the capability for cyclic pitch. This can easily be controlled by a microcontroller, allowing this system to be interfaced with the flight control system. This system can also control the pitch of the blades during transit, allowing the blades themselves to act as ailerons for the aircraft.
