= Kamar Zard, Kermanshah =

Kamar Zard كمرزرد
- Village
- Location within Iran
- Coordinates: 34°02′03″N 46°52′29″E
- Country: Iran
- Province: Kermanshah
- County: Eslamabad-e Gharb
- Bakhsh: Central
- Rural District: Hasanabad

Population (2006)
  - Total: 689
- Time zone: UTC+3:30 (IRST)
  - Summer (DST): UTC+4:30 (IRDT)

Kamar Zard (Persian: كمرزرد) is a village in Hasanabad Rural District, in the Central District of Eslamabad-e Gharb County, Kermanshah Province, Iran. At the 2006 census, its population was 689, in 145 families.
