= Goldasht, Lamerd =

Goldasht گل دشت
- Village
- Location within Iran
- Coordinates: 27°42′07″N 52°53′25″E
- Country: Iran
- Province: Fars
- County: Lamerd
- Bakhsh: Alamarvdasht
- Rural District: Alamarvdasht

Population (2006)
  - Total: 326
- Time zone: UTC+3:30 (IRST)
  - Summer (DST): UTC+4:30 (IRDT)

Goldasht (Former name:Gol-e Kharg) (Persian: گلدشت، گل‌خرگ; also known as Gol-e Kharak) is a village in Alamarvdasht Rural District, Alamarvdasht District, Lamerd County, Fars province, Iran. At the 2006 census, its population was 326, in 75 families. In summer 2015 the name of this village officially changed to Goldasht by the Cabinet of Iran.
