= Mansurabad, Kamfiruz =

Mansurabad منصوراباد
- Village
- Location within Iran
- Coordinates: 30°20′38″N 52°13′04″E
- Country: Iran
- Province: Fars
- County: Marvdasht
- Bakhsh: Kamfiruz
- Rural District: Kamfiruz-e Jonubi

Population (2006)
  - Total: 397
- Time zone: UTC+3:30 (IRST)
  - Summer (DST): UTC+4:30 (IRDT)

Mansurabad (Persian: منصوراباد, also Romanized as Manşūrābād) is a village in Kamfiruz-e Jonubi Rural District, Kamfiruz District, Marvdasht County, Fars province, Iran. At the 2006 census, its population was 397, in 85 families.
