= Rostaq, Hormozgan =

Rostaq رستاق
- Village
- Location within Iran
- Coordinates: 26°53′01″N 53°51′40″E
- Country: Iran
- Province: Hormozgan
- County: Bandar Lengeh
- Bakhsh: Shibkaveh
- Rural District: Moqam

Population (2006)
  - Total: 679
- Time zone: UTC+3:30 (IRST)
  - Summer (DST): UTC+4:30 (IRDT)

Rostaq (Persian: رستاق, also Romanized as Rostāq; also known as Rastagh, Rowstāq, and Rustāq) is a village in Moqam Rural District, Shibkaveh District, Bandar Lengeh County, Hormozgan Province, Iran. At the 2006 census, its population was 679, in 133 families.
