= Yakhdan, Afghanistan =

Yakhdan یخدان
- Village
- Location in Afghanistan
- Coordinates: 32°58′00″N 65°29′28″E
- Country: Afghanistan
- Province: Uruzgan Province

Yakhdan is a village in Urozgan Province, Afghanistan. It is the home town of Nasrat Khan.
