= Maqsudabad, Kerman =

Maqsudabad مقصوداباد
- Village
- Location within Iran
- Coordinates: 29°34′12″N 56°19′15″E
- Country: Iran
- Province: Kerman
- County: Sirjan
- Bakhsh: Central
- Rural District: Chahar Gonbad

Population (2006)
  - Total: 74
- Time zone: UTC+3:30 (IRST)
  - Summer (DST): UTC+4:30 (IRDT)

Maqsudabad (Persian: مقصوداباد, also Romanized as Maqşūdābād) is a village in Chahar Gonbad Rural District, in the Central District of Sirjan County, Kerman Province, Iran. At the 2006 census, its population was 74, in 18 families.
