= Rostaq, Fars =

City in Fars province, Iran

Rostaq Persian: رستاق
- City
- Location within Iran
- Coordinates: 28°26′48″N 55°04′40″E
- Country: Iran
- Province: Fars
- County: Darab
- District: Rostaq

Population (2016)
  - Total: 3,598
- Time zone: UTC+3:30 (IRST)

Rostaq (Persian: رستاق) (Note: Also romanized as Rostāq; also known as Rastagh, Rusāq, Rustākh, and Rūstāq) is a city in, and the capital of, Rostaq District of Darab County, Fars province, Iran. As a village, Rostaq was the capital of Rostaq Rural District until the capital was transferred to the village of Lay Zangan.

== Demographics ==
=== Population ===
At the time of the 2006 National Census, Rostaq's population was 3,519 in 773 households, when it was a village in Rostaq Rural District. The following census in 2011 counted 3,989 people in 936 households. The 2016 census measured the population of the village as 3,598 people in 980 households. It was the most populous village in its rural district.

After the census, Rostaq was elevated to the status of a city.
