= Mansurabad-e Mehdiyeh =

Mansurabad-e Mehdiyeh منصورابادمهديه
- Village
- Location within Iran
- Coordinates: 30°20′52″N 51°09′44″E
- Country: Iran
- Province: Kohgiluyeh and Boyer-Ahmad
- County: Basht
- Bakhsh: Basht
- Rural District: Babuyi

Population (2006)
  - Total: 257
- Time zone: UTC+3:30 (IRST)
  - Summer (DST): UTC+4:30 (IRDT)

Mansurabad-e Mehdiyeh (Persian: منصورابادمهديه, also Romanized as Manşūrābād-e Mehdīyeh; also known as Manşūrābād-e Bālā) is a village in Babuyi Rural District, Basht District, Basht County, Kohgiluyeh and Boyer-Ahmad Province, Iran. At the 2006 census, its population was 257, in 45 families.
