= Mansurabad-e Olya =

Mansurabad-e Olya منصورابادعليا
- Village
- Location within Iran
- Coordinates: 30°21′07″N 51°21′28″E
- Country: Iran
- Province: Fars
- County: Rostam
- Bakhsh: Central
- Rural District: Rostam-e Do

Population (2006)
  - Total: 390
- Time zone: UTC+3:30 (IRST)
  - Summer (DST): UTC+4:30 (IRDT)

Mansurabad-e Olya (Persian: منصورابادعليا, also Romanized as Manşūrābād-e 'Olyā; also known as Manşūrābād-e Bālā) is a village in Rostam-e Do Rural District, in the Central District of Rostam County, Fars province, Iran. At the 2006 census, its population was 390, in 80 families.
