= Estakhr, South Khorasan =

Estakhr استخر
- Village
- Location within Iran
- Coordinates: 32°55′02″N 59°33′39″E
- Country: Iran
- Province: South Khorasan
- County: Birjand
- Bakhsh: Central
- Rural District: Kahshang

Population (2016)
  - Total: 63
- Time zone: UTC+3:30 (IRST)
  - Summer (DST): UTC+4:30 (IRDT)

Estakhr (Persian: استخر; also known as Qal‘eh Estakhr, Esţarkh, and Istlāk) is a village in Kahshang Rural District, in the Central District of Birjand County, South Khorasan province, Iran. At the 2016 census, its population was 63, in 23 families.
