= Rudbal Rural District =

Rural district in Fars province, Iran

Rudbal Rural District Persian: دهستان رودبال
- Rural District
- Location within Iran
- Coordinates: 29°58′26″N 52°45′41″E
- Country: Iran
- Province: Fars
- County: Marvdasht
- District: Central
- Capital: Garmabad

Population (2016)
  - Total: 10,376
- Time zone: UTC+3:30 (IRST)

Rudbal Rural District (Persian: دهستان رودبال) is in the Central District of Marvdasht County, Fars province, Iran. Its capital is the village of Garmabad. The previous capital of the rural district was the village of Fathabad, now a city.

== Demographics ==
=== Population ===
At the time of the 2006 National Census, the rural district's population was 10,880 in 2,599 households. There were 10,675 inhabitants in 2,896 households at the following census of 2011. The 2016 census measured the population of the rural district as 10,376 in 3,034 households. The most populous of its 37 villages was Fathabad (now a city), with 4,739 people.
