= Naqsh-e Rostam Rural District =

Rural district in Fars province, Iran

Naqsh-e Rostam Rural District Persian: دهستان نقش رستم
- Rural District
- Location within Iran
- Coordinates: 30°02′00″N 52°52′44″E
- Country: Iran
- Province: Fars
- County: Marvdasht
- District: Central
- Capital: Hajjiabad

Population (2016)
  - Total: 14,195
- Time zone: UTC+3:30 (IRST)

Naqsh-e Rostam Rural District (Persian: دهستان نقش رستم) is in the Central District of Marvdasht County, Fars province, Iran. Its capital is the village of Hajjiabad. The previous capital of the rural district was the village of Zangiabad, now a city.

== Demographics ==
=== Population ===
At the time of the 2006 National Census, the rural district's population was 13,737 in 3,237 households. There were 14,473 inhabitants in 3,998 households at the following census of 2011. The 2016 census measured the population of the rural district as 14,195 in 4,314 households. The most populous of its 26 villages was Zangiabad (now a city), with 4,273 people.
