= Kenareh Rural District =

Rural district in Fars province, Iran

Kenareh Rural District Persian: دهستان كناره
- Rural District
- Location within Iran
- Coordinates: 29°53′23″N 52°50′42″E
- Country: Iran
- Province: Fars
- County: Marvdasht
- District: Central
- Capital: Kenareh

Population (2016)
  - Total: 19,815
- Time zone: UTC+3:30 (IRST)

Kenareh Rural District (Persian: دهستان كناره) is in the Central District of Marvdasht County, Fars province, Iran. Its capital is the village of Kenareh.

== Demographics ==
=== Population ===
At the time of the 2006 National Census, the rural district's population was 20,024 in 5,070 households. There were 20,275 inhabitants in 5,706 households at the following census of 2011. The 2016 census measured the population of the rural district as 19,815 in 6,054 households. The most populous of its 50 villages was Kenareh, with 6,571 people.
