= Ramjerd-e Yek Rural District =

Rural district in Fars province, Iran

Ramjerd-e Yek Rural District Persian: دهستان رامجرد يك
- Rural District
- Location within Iran
- Coordinates: 29°58′27″N 52°40′28″E
- Country: Iran
- Province: Fars
- County: Marvdasht
- District: Central
- Capital: Kuh Sabz

Population (2016)
  - Total: 9,994
- Time zone: UTC+3:30 (IRST)

Ramjerd-e Yek Rural District (Persian: دهستان رامجرد يك) is in the Central District of Marvdasht County, Fars province, Iran. Its capital is the village of Kuh Sabz.

== Demographics ==
=== Population ===
At the time of the 2006 National Census, the rural district's population was 10,138 in 2,254 households. There were 9,904 inhabitants in 2,656 households at the following census of 2011. The 2016 census measured the population of the rural district as 9,994 in 2,905 households. The most populous of its 58 villages was Kuh Sabz, with 2,871 people.
