= Majdabad Rural District =

Rural district in Fars province, Iran

Majdabad Rural District Persian: دهستان مجدآباد
- Rural District
- Location within Iran
- Coordinates: 29°54′22″N 52°38′56″E
- Country: Iran
- Province: Fars
- County: Marvdasht
- District: Central
- Capital: Majdabad

Population (2016)
  - Total: 8,410
- Time zone: UTC+3:30 (IRST)

Majdabad Rural District (Persian: دهستان مجدآباد) is in the Central District of Marvdasht County, Fars province, Iran. Its capital is the village of Majdabad.

== Demographics ==
=== Population ===
At the time of the 2006 National Census, the rural district's population was 8,055 in 1,856 households. There were 7,875 inhabitants in 2,099 households at the following census of 2011. The 2016 census measured the population of the rural district as 8,410 in 2,385 households. The most populous of its 29 villages was Majdabad, with 3,353 people.
