= Mohammadabad Rural District (Marvdasht County) =

Rural district in Fars province, Iran

Mohammadabad Rural District Persian: دهستان محمدآباد
- Rural District
- Location within Iran
- Coordinates: 29°48′37″N 52°59′41″E
- Country: Iran
- Province: Fars
- County: Marvdasht
- District: Central
- Capital: Mohammadabad

Population (2016)
  - Total: 9,515
- Time zone: UTC+3:30 (IRST)

Mohammadabad Rural District (Persian: دهستان محمدآباد) is in the Central District of Marvdasht County, Fars province, Iran. Its capital is the village of Mohammadabad.

== Demographics ==
=== Population ===
At the time of the 2006 National Census, the rural district's population was 8,758 in 2,150 households. There were 8,663 inhabitants in 2,455 households at the following census of 2011. The 2016 census measured the population of the rural district as 9,515 in 2,891 households. The most populous of its 68 villages was Rejaabad, with 1,526 people.
