= Sefid Sang Rural District =

Rural district in Razavi Khorasan province, Iran

Sefid Sang Rural District Persian: دهستان سفيدسنگ
- Rural District
- Location within Iran
- Coordinates: 35°42′N 60°16′E
- Country: Iran
- Province: Razavi Khorasan
- County: Fariman
- District: Qalandarabad
- Established: 1986
- Capital: Sefid Sang

Population (2016)
  - Total: 3,273
- Time zone: UTC+3:30 (IRST)

Sefid Sang Rural District (Persian: دهستان سفيدسنگ) is in Qalandarabad District of Fariman County, Razavi Khorasan province, Iran. It is administered from the city of Sefid Sang.

== Demographics ==
=== Population ===
At the time of the 2006 National Census, the rural district's population was 2,725 in 627 households. There were 2,958 inhabitants in 760 households at the following census of 2011. The 2016 census measured the population of the rural district as 3,273 in 898 households. The most populous of its 23 villages was Kariz-e Hajj Mohammad Jan, with 1,821 people.

=== Other villages in the rural district ===
- Alghur
- Baratabad
- Cheshmeh Gondeh
- Do Qaleh-ye Berashk
- Mohammadabad-e Sar Cheshmeh Berashk
- Razmgah-e Olya
