= Rostaq Rural District (Darab County) =

Rural district in Fars province, Iran

Rostaq Rural District Persian: دهستان رستاق
- Rural District
- Location within Iran
- Coordinates: 28°31′59″N 55°02′30″E
- Country: Iran
- Province: Fars
- County: Darab
- District: Rostaq
- Capital: Lay Zangan

Population (2016)
  - Total: 8,830
- Time zone: UTC+3:30 (IRST)

Rostaq Rural District (Persian: دهستان رستاق) is in Rostaq District of Darab County, Fars province, Iran. Its capital is the village of Lay Zangan. The previous capital of the rural district was the village of Rostaq, now a city.

== Demographics ==
=== Population ===
At the time of the 2006 National Census, the rural district's population was 9,171 in 2,206 households. There were 9,355 inhabitants in 2,421 households at the following census of 2011. The 2016 census measured the population of the rural district as 8,830 in 2,535 households. The most populous of its 74 villages was Rostaq (now a city), with 3,598 people.
