= Qalandarabad Rural District =

Rural district in Razavi Khorasan province, Iran

Qalandarabad Rural District Persian: دهستان قلندرآباد
- Rural District
- Location within Iran
- Coordinates: 35°33′N 59°57′E
- Country: Iran
- Province: Razavi Khorasan
- County: Fariman
- District: Qalandarabad
- Established: 1986
- Capital: Qalandarabad

Population (2016)
  - Total: 11,079
- Time zone: UTC+3:30 (IRST)

Qalandarabad Rural District (Persian: دهستان قلندرآباد) is in Qalandarabad District of Fariman County, Razavi Khorasan province, Iran. It is administered from the city of Qalandarabad.

== Demographics ==
=== Population ===
At the time of the 2006 National Census, the rural district's population was 10,243 residing in 2,338 households. The subsequent census of 2011 recorded 10,334 inhabitants living in 2,693 households. The 2016 census measured the population of the rural district as 11,079 in 3,080 households. The most populous village in the rural district was Kateh Shamshir-e Sofla, with 3,112 people.

=== Other villages in the rural district ===
- Arreh Kamar
- Chahar Takab
- Hoseynabad-e Rekhneh Gol
- Kateh Shamshir-e Olya
- Taqiabad
- Telgerd
