= Kuhestan Rural District (Darab County) =

Rural district in Fars province, Iran

Kuhestan Rural District Persian: دهستان كوهستان
- Rural District
- Location within Iran
- Coordinates: 28°31′02″N 55°13′45″E
- Country: Iran
- Province: Fars
- County: Darab
- District: Rostaq
- Capital: Tall Bargah

Population (2016)
  - Total: 5,561
- Time zone: UTC+3:30 (IRST)

Kuhestan Rural District (Persian: دهستان كوهستان) is in Rostaq District of Darab County, Fars province, Iran. Its capital is the village of Tall Bargah.

== Demographics ==
=== Population ===
At the time of the 2006 National Census, the rural district's population was 5,070 in 1,196 households. There were 4,985 inhabitants in 1,356 households at the following census of 2011. The 2016 census measured the population of the rural district as 5,561 in 1,653 households. The most populous of its 84 villages was Shahrak-e Isar, with 1,680 people.
