= Central District (Marvdasht County) =

District in Fars province, Iran

Central District (Marvdasht County) Persian: بخش مرکزی شهرستان مرودشت
- District
- Location within Iran
- Coordinates: 29°54′34″N 52°50′33″E
- Country: Iran
- Province: Fars
- County: Marvdasht
- Capital: Marvdasht

Population (2016)
  - Total: 221,163
- Time zone: UTC+3:30 (IRST)

The Central District of Marvdasht County (Persian: بخش مرکزی شهرستان مرودشت) is in Fars province, Iran. Its capital is the city of Marvdasht.

== History ==
After the 2016 census, the villages of Fathabad and Zangiabad were elevated to city status.

== Demographics ==
=== Population ===
At the time of the 2006 National Census, the district's population was 195,450 in 46,300 households. The following census in 2011 counted 210,514 people in 57,728 households. The 2016 census measured the population of the district as 221,163 inhabitants in 65,111 households.

=== Administrative divisions ===
Central District (Marvdasht County) Population
Administrative Divisions	2006	2011	2016
Kenareh RD	20,024	20,275	19,815
Majdabad RD	8,055	7,875	8,410
Mohammadabad RD	8,758	8,663	9,515
Naqsh-e Rostam RD	13,737	14,473	14,195
Ramjerd-e Yek RD	10,138	9,904	9,994
Rudbal RD	10,880	10,675	10,376
Fathabad (city) (Note: Became a city after the 2016 census)			
Marvdasht (city)	123,858	138,649	148,858
Zangiabad (city) (Note: Became a city after the 2016 census)			
Total	195,450	210,514	221,163
RD = Rural District
