= Qalandarabad District =

District in Razavi Khorasan province, Iran

Qalandarabad District Persian: بخش قلندرآباد
- District
- Location within Iran
- Coordinates: 35°39′N 60°09′E
- Country: Iran
- Province: Razavi Khorasan
- County: Fariman
- Established: 1993
- Capital: Qalandarabad

Population (2016)
  - Total: 25,361
- Time zone: UTC+3:30 (IRST)

Qalandarabad District (Persian: بخش قلندرآباد) is in Fariman County, Razavi Khorasan province, Iran. Its capital is the city of Qalandarabad.

== Demographics ==
=== Population ===
At the time of the 2006 National Census, the district's population was 22,734 in 5,243 households. The following census in 2011 counted 23,761 people in 6,312 households. The 2016 census measured the population of the district as 25,361 inhabitants in 7,119 households.

=== Administrative divisions ===
Qalandarabad District Population
Administrative Divisions	2006	2011	2016
Qalandarabad RD	10,243	10,334	11,079
Sefid Sang RD	2,725	2,958	3,273
Qalandarabad (city)	4,872	4,924	4,880
Sefid Sang (city)	4,894	5,545	6,129
Total	22,734	23,761	25,361
RD = Rural District
