= Rostaq District =

District in Fars province, Iran

Rostaq District Persian: بخش رستاق
- District
- Location within Iran
- Coordinates: 28°31′02″N 55°10′03″E
- Country: Iran
- Province: Fars
- County: Darab
- Capital: Rostaq

Population (2016)
  - Total: 14,391
- Time zone: UTC+3:30 (IRST)

Rostaq District (Persian: بخش رستاق) is in Darab County, Fars province, Iran. Is capital is the city of Rostaq.

== History ==
In 2018, the village of Rostaq was elevated to the status of a city.

== Demographics ==
=== Population ===
At the time of the 2006 National Census, the district's population was 14,241 in 3,402 households. The following census in 2011 counted 14,340 people in 3,777 households. The 2016 census measured the population of the district as 14,391 inhabitants in 4,188 households.

=== Administrative divisions ===
Rostaq District Population
Administrative Divisions	2006	2011	2016
Kuhestan RD	5,070	4,985	5,561
Rostaq RD	9,171	9,355	8,830
Rostaq (city) (Note: Became a city after the 2016 census)			
Total	14,241	14,340	14,391
RD = Rural District
