= Malekabad =

Malekabad or Malikabad or Molkabad or Malkabad or Mallakabad (Persian: ملك اباد) may refer to:

== Alborz Province ==
- Malekabad-e Hammanlu, a village in Savojbolagh County, Alborz Province, Iran

== Chaharmahal and Bakhtiari Province ==
- Malekabad, Kuhrang, a village in Kuhrang County
- Malekabad, Bazoft, a village in Kuhrang County
- Malekabad-e Yek, a village in Kuhrang County

== Fars Province ==
- Malekabad, Rostaq, a village in Darab County
- Malekabad, Forg, a village in Darab County
- Shahrak-e Malekabad, a village in Darab County
- Malekabad, Jahrom, a village in Jahrom County
- Malekabad, Marvdasht, a village in Marvdasht County
- Malekabad, Arzhan, a village in Shiraz County
- Malekabad, Shiraz, a village in Shiraz County

== Kerman Province ==
- Malekabad, Anbarabad, a village in Anbarabad County
- Malekabad, Jiroft, a village in Jiroft County
- Malekabad, Kerman, a village in Kerman County
- Malekabad, Narmashir, a village in Narmashir County
- Malekabad, Rafsanjan, a village in Rafsanjan County
- Malekabad, Rigan, a village in Rigan County
- Malekabad, Sirjan, a village in Sirjan County
- Malekabad, Zarand, a village in Zarand County
- Malekabad Rural District, in Sirjan County

== Kermanshah Province ==
- Malekabad, Kermanshah, a village in Sonqor County

== Kohgiluyeh and Boyer-Ahmad Province ==
- Malekabad, Kohgiluyeh and Boyer-Ahmad, a village in Basht County

== Kurdistan Province ==
- Malekabad, Kurdistan, a village in Qorveh County

== Lorestan Province ==
- Malekabad, Aligudarz, a village in Aligudarz County
- Malekabad, Borujerd, a village in Borujerd County
- Malekabad, Delfan, a village in Delfan County
- Malekabad, Khorramabad, a village in Khorramabad County
- Malekabad, Zagheh, a village in Khorramabad County
- Malekabad, Qaleh-ye Mozaffari, a village in Selseleh County
- Malekabad, Yusefvand, a village in Selseleh County
- Malekabad-e Somaq, a village in Dowreh County

== Markazi Province ==
- Malekabad, Arak, a village in Arak County, Markazi Province, Iran
- Malekabad, Saveh, a village in Saveh County, Markazi Province, Iran

== Mazandaran Province ==
- Malekabad-e Bala, a village in Sari County
- Malekabad-e Pain, a village in Sari County

== Qom Province ==
- Malekabad, Qom, a village in Qom Province, Iran

== Razavi Khorasan Province ==
- Malekabad, Razavi Khorasan, a city in Iran
- Malekabad, Khoshab, a village in Khoshab County
- Malekabad, Rashtkhvar, a village in Rashtkhvar County
- Malekabad, Torbat-e Heydarieh, a village in Torbat-e Heydarieh County
- Malekabad, Torbat-e Jam, a village in Torbat-e Jam County

== Sistan and Baluchestan Province ==
- Malekabad, Bampur, a village in Bampur County
- Malekabad, Dalgan, a village in Dalgan County
- Malekabad, Iranshahr, a village in Iranshahr County
- Malekabad, Eskelabad, a village in Khash County

== South Khorasan Province ==
- Malekabad, Birjand, a village in Birjand County
- Malekabad, alternate name of Mobarakabad, South Khorasan, a village in Birjand County
- Malekabad, Qaen, a village in Qaen County

== Tehran Province ==
- Malekabad, Tehran, a village in Eslamshahr County

== West Azerbaijan Province ==
- Malekabad, West Azerbaijan, a village in Miandoab County
