= Malekabad, Lorestan =

Malekabad, Lorestan may refer to:

- Malekabad, Borujerd
- Malekabad, Delfan
- Malekabad, Qaleh-ye Mozaffari, Selseleh County
- Malekabad, Yusefvand, Selseleh County
