= Kuh Sefid =

Kuh Sefid or Kuh-e Sefid or Kooh Sefid or Kuhsafid (Persian: كوه سفيد, meaning "white mountain") may refer to:

- Kuh Sefid, Fars
- Kuh Sefid, Hormozgan
- Kuh Sefid, Kerman
- Kuh-e Sefid, Markazi
- Kuh Sefid, Qom
- Kuh-e Sefid, Razavi Khorasan
- Kuh Sefid-e Sofla, Razavi Khorasan Province
- Kuh Sefid, Sistan and Baluchestan
- Kuh Sefid Rural District, Sistan and Baluchestan Province

== See also ==
- Sefid Kuh (disambiguation)
