= Abshur =

Abshur or Ab Shur or Ab-e Shur (Persian: ابشور) may refer to:

- Abshur, Fars
- Ab-e Shur, Fars
- Abshur, Hormozgan
- Ab Shur, Kerman
- Abshur, Razavi Khorasan
- Abshur Rural District, in Fars Province
