= Kalatu =

Kalatu or Kelatu (Persian: كلاتو), also rendered as Kalato, may refer to:

- Kalatu, Darab, Fars Province
- Kalatu, Kazerun, Fars Province
- Kalatu, Bandar Abbas, Hormozgan Province
- Kalatu, Bandar Lengeh, Hormozgan Province
- Kalatu, Hajjiabad, Hormozgan Province
- Kalatu, Rudan, Hormozgan Province
- Kalatu, Kerman
