= Mohammadabad, Qaleh Biyaban =

Village in Fars province, Iran

Mohammadabad Persian: محمداباد
- Village
- Location within Iran
- Coordinates: 28°31′02″N 54°53′10″E
- Country: Iran
- Province: Fars
- County: Darab
- District: Jannat
- Rural District: Qaleh Biyaban

Population (2016)
  - Total: Below reporting threshold
- Time zone: UTC+3:30 (IRST)

Mohammadabad (Persian: محمداباد) (Note: Also romanized as Moḩammadābād) is a village in Qaleh Biyaban Rural District of Jannat District, Darab County, Fars province, Iran.

== Demographics ==
=== Population ===
At the time of the 2006 National Census, the village's population was 82 in 17 households, when it was in the Central District. The following census in 2011 counted 22 people in six households, by which time the rural district had been separated from the district in the establishment of Jannat District. The 2016 census measured the population of the village as below the reporting threshold.
