= Shahrak-e Ghadir Navaygan =

Shahrak-e Ghadir Navaygan شهرك غديرنوايگان
- Village
- Location within Iran
- Coordinates: 28°34′37″N 54°51′33″E
- Country: Iran
- Province: Fars
- County: Darab
- Bakhsh: Central
- Rural District: Qaleh Biyaban

Population (2006)
  - Total: 714
- Time zone: UTC+3:30 (IRST)
  - Summer (DST): UTC+4:30 (IRDT)

Shahrak-e Ghadir Navaygan (Persian: شهرك غديرنوايگان, also Romanized as Shahrak-e Ghadīr Navāygān; also known as Shahrak-e Ghadīr) is a village in Qaleh Biyaban Rural District, in the Central District of Darab County, Fars province, Iran. At the 2006 census, its population was 714, in 194 families.
