= Bizdan =

Bizdan بيزدان
- Village
- Location within Iran
- Coordinates: 28°38′34″N 54°24′35″E
- Country: Iran
- Province: Fars
- County: Darab
- Bakhsh: Central
- Rural District: Nasrovan

Population (2006)
  - Total: 206
- Time zone: UTC+3:30 (IRST)
  - Summer (DST): UTC+4:30 (IRDT)

Bizdan (Persian: بيزدان, also Romanized as Bīzdān; also known as Bīzāb) is a village in Nasrovan Rural District, in the Central District of Darab County, Fars province, Iran. At the 2006 census, its population was 206, in 47 families.
