= Dangan, Iran =

Dangan دنگان
- Village
- Location within Iran
- Coordinates: 28°41′07″N 54°32′29″E
- Country: Iran
- Province: Fars
- County: Darab
- Bakhsh: Central
- Rural District: Hashivar

Population (2006)
  - Total: 542
- Time zone: UTC+3:30 (IRST)
  - Summer (DST): UTC+4:30 (IRDT)

Dangan (Persian: دنگان, also Romanized as Dangān; also known as Dankan) is a village in Hashivar Rural District, in the Central District of Darab County, Fars province, Iran. At the 2006 census, its population was 542, in 114 families.
