= Rambeh =

Rambeh رمبه
- Village
- Location within Iran
- Coordinates: 28°40′54″N 54°37′03″E
- Country: Iran
- Province: Fars
- County: Darab
- Bakhsh: Central
- Rural District: Qaryah ol Kheyr

Population (2006)
  - Total: 253
- Time zone: UTC+3:30 (IRST)
  - Summer (DST): UTC+4:30 (IRDT)

Rambeh (Persian: رمبه; also known as Qal‘eh-i-Rumbeh, Qal‘eh-i-Rumbsh, Qal‘eh-ye Rūmbeh) is a village in Qaryah ol Kheyr Rural District, in the Central District of Darab County, Fars province, Iran. At the 2006 census, its population was 253, in 55 families.
