= Arab Chegini =

Village in Fars province, Iran

Arab Chegini Persian: اعراب چگيني
- Village
- Location within Iran
- Coordinates: 28°47′08″N 54°21′38″E
- Country: Iran
- Province: Fars
- County: Darab
- District: Fasarud
- Rural District: Paskhan

Population (2016)
  - Total: 1,560
- Time zone: UTC+3:30 (IRST)

Arab Chegini (Persian: اعراب چگيني) (Note: Also romanized as ‘Arab Chegīnī; also known as A‘rāb Chegenī) is a village in Paskhan Rural District of Fasarud District, Darab County, Fars province, Iran.

== Demographics ==
=== Population ===
At the time of the 2006 National Census, the village's population was 1,196 in 264 households, when it was in the Central District. The following census in 2011 counted 1,371 people in 374 households. The 2016 census measured the population of the village as 1,560 people in 446 households. It was the most populous village in its rural district.

After the census, the rural district was separated from the district in the establishment of Fasarud District.
