= Biadeh =

Biadeh بياده
- Village
- Location within Iran
- Coordinates: 28°40′58″N 54°27′36″E
- Country: Iran
- Province: Fars
- County: Darab
- Bakhsh: Central
- Rural District: Hashivar

Population (2006)
  - Total: 647
- Time zone: UTC+3:30 (IRST)
  - Summer (DST): UTC+4:30 (IRDT)

Biadeh (Persian: بياده, also Romanized as Bīādeh and Biyādeh) is a village in Hashivar Rural District, in the Central District of Darab County, Fars province, Iran. At the 2006 census, its population was 647, in 143 families.
