= Tahuneh, Darab =

Tahuneh طاهونه
- Village
- Location within Iran
- Coordinates: 28°17′40″N 55°11′32″E
- Country: Iran
- Province: Fars
- County: Darab
- Bakhsh: Forg
- Rural District: Forg

Population (2006)
  - Total: 707
- Time zone: UTC+3:30 (IRST)
  - Summer (DST): UTC+4:30 (IRDT)

Tahuneh (Persian: طاهونه, also Romanized as Ţāhūneh) is a village in Forg Rural District, Forg District, Darab County, Fars province, Iran. At the 2006 census, its population was 707, in 153 families.
