= Deh Kheyr-e Pain =

Village in Fars province, Iran

Deh Kheyr-e Pain Persian: ده خيرپائين
- Village
- Location within Iran
- Coordinates: 28°38′51″N 54°39′13″E
- Country: Iran
- Province: Fars
- County: Darab
- District: Jannat
- Rural District: Qaryah ol Kheyr

Population (2016)
  - Total: 2,202
- Time zone: UTC+3:30 (IRST)

Deh Kheyr-e Pain (Persian: ده خيرپائين) (Note: Also romanized as Deh Khair Pain and Deh Kheyr-e Pā’īn; also known as Deh Kheyr-e Soflá and Kheir Sofla) is a village in, and the capital of, Qaryah ol Kheyr Rural District of Jannat District, Darab County, Fars province, Iran.

== Demographics ==
=== Population ===
At the time of the 2006 National Census, the village's population was 1,987 in 459 households, when it was in the Central District. The following census in 2011 counted 2,099 people in 587 households, by which time the rural district had been separated from the district in the establishment of Jannat District. The 2016 census measured the population of the village as 2,202 people in 706 households. It was the most populous village in its rural district.
