= Marbuyeh =

Marbuyeh مربويه
- Village
- Location within Iran
- Coordinates: 28°45′06″N 54°17′48″E
- Country: Iran
- Province: Fars
- County: Darab
- Bakhsh: Central
- Rural District: Paskhan

Population (2006)
  - Total: 443
- Time zone: UTC+3:30 (IRST)
  - Summer (DST): UTC+4:30 (IRDT)

Marbuyeh (Persian: مربويه, also Romanized as Marbūyeh) is a village in Paskhan Rural District, in the Central District of Darab County, Fars province, Iran. At the 2006 census, its population was 443, in 100 families.
