= Bon Dasht =

Bon Dasht بن دشت
- Village
- Location within Iran
- Coordinates: 28°33′23″N 54°46′55″E
- Country: Iran
- Province: Fars
- County: Darab
- Bakhsh: Central
- Rural District: Qaleh Biyaban

Population (2006)
  - Total: 34
- Time zone: UTC+3:30 (IRST)
  - Summer (DST): UTC+4:30 (IRDT)

Bon Dasht (Persian: بن دشت) is a village in Qaleh Biyaban Rural District, in the Central District of Darab County, Fars province, Iran. At the 2006 census, its population was 34, in 11 families.
