= Nosratabad, Fars =

Nosratabad نصرت اباد
- Village
- Location within Iran
- Coordinates: 28°17′22″N 55°11′39″E
- Country: Iran
- Province: Fars
- County: Darab
- Bakhsh: Forg
- Rural District: Forg

Population (2006)
  - Total: 866
- Time zone: UTC+3:30 (IRST)
  - Summer (DST): UTC+4:30 (IRDT)

Nosratabad (Persian: نصرت اباد, also Romanized as Noşratābād; also known as Nosrat) is a village in Forg Rural District, Forg District, Darab County, Fars province, Iran. At the 2006 census, its population was 866, in 194 families.
