= Ab Shib =

Ab Shib اب شيب
- Village
- Location within Iran
- Coordinates: 28°39′10″N 54°29′25″E
- Country: Iran
- Province: Fars
- County: Darab
- Bakhsh: Central
- Rural District: Hashivar

Population (2006)
  - Total: 749
- Time zone: UTC+3:30 (IRST)
  - Summer (DST): UTC+4:30 (IRDT)

Ab Shib (Persian: اب شيب, also Romanized as Āb Shīb; also known as Ābshi) is a village in Hashivar Rural District, in the Central District of Darab County, Fars province, Iran. At the 2006 census, its population was 749, in 153 families.
