= Bikheh Deraz =

Bikheh Deraz بيخه دراز
- Village
- Location within Iran
- Coordinates: 28°41′00″N 54°09′59″E
- Country: Iran
- Province: Fars
- County: Darab
- Bakhsh: Central
- Rural District: Fasarud

Population (2006)
  - Total: 37
- Time zone: UTC+3:30 (IRST)
  - Summer (DST): UTC+4:30 (IRDT)

Bikheh Deraz (Persian: بيخه دراز, also Romanized as Bīkheh Derāz; also known as Bīkhderāz) is a village in Fasarud Rural District, in the Central District of Darab County, Fars province, Iran. At the 2006 census, its population was 37 consisting of 5 families.
