= Borgan, Fars =

Borgan برگان
- Village
- Location within Iran
- Coordinates: 28°44′05″N 54°27′09″E
- Country: Iran
- Province: Fars
- County: Darab
- Bakhsh: Central
- Rural District: Bakhtajerd

Population (2006)
  - Total: 1,132
- Time zone: UTC+3:30 (IRST)
  - Summer (DST): UTC+4:30 (IRDT)

Bargan (Persian: برگان, also Romanized as Bargān; also known as Barkān) is a village in Bakhtajerd Rural District, in the Central District of Darab County, Fars province, Iran. At the 2006 census, its population was 1,132, in 259 families.
