= Mansurabad, Darab =

Mansurabad منصوراباد
- Village
- Location within Iran
- Coordinates: 28°46′11″N 54°18′25″E
- Country: Iran
- Province: Fars
- County: Darab
- Bakhsh: Central
- Rural District: Paskhan

Population (2006)
  - Total: 541
- Time zone: UTC+3:30 (IRST)
  - Summer (DST): UTC+4:30 (IRDT)

Mansurabad (Persian: منصوراباد, also Romanized as Manşūrābād) is a village in Paskhan Rural District, in the Central District of Darab County, Fars province, Iran. At the 2006 census, its population was 541, in 123 families.
