= Pir Morad =

Pir Morad or Pirmorad or Pir-e Morad (Persian: پيرمراد) may refer to:

- Pir-e Morad, Fars
- Pir Morad, Lorestan
- Pir Morad, West Azerbaijan
