= Hojjatabad-e Kaseh Rud =

Hojjatabad-e Kaseh Rud حجت‌آباد کاسه‌رود
- Village
- Location within Iran
- Coordinates: 28°22′41″N 55°12′54″E
- Country: Iran
- Province: Fars
- County: Darab
- Bakhsh: Forg
- Rural District: Forg

Population (2006)
  - Total: 38
- Time zone: UTC+3:30 (IRST)
  - Summer (DST): UTC+4:30 (IRDT)

Hojjatabad-e Kaseh Rud (Persian: حجت‌آباد کاسه‌رود, also Romanized as Ḩojjatābād-e Kāseh-Rūd; also known as Ḩojjatābād) is a village in Forg Rural District, Forg District, Darab County, Fars province, Iran. At the 2006 census, its population was 38, in 8 families.
