= Dehkestan =

Dehkestan ده كستان
- Village
- Location within Iran
- Coordinates: 28°42′10″N 54°23′39″E
- Country: Iran
- Province: Fars
- County: Darab
- Bakhsh: Central
- Rural District: Bakhtajerd

Population (2006)
  - Total: 190
- Time zone: UTC+3:30 (IRST)
  - Summer (DST): UTC+4:30 (IRDT)

Dehkestan (Persian: ده كستان, also Romanized as Dehkestān; also known as Dahkestān) is a village in Bakhtajerd Rural District, in the Central District of Darab County, Fars province, Iran. At the 2006 census, its population was 190, in 45 families.
