= Shahrak-e Shahid Rajai, Darab =

Shahrak-e Shahid Rajai شهرك شهيد رجايي
- Village
- Country: Iran
- Province: Fars
- County: Darab
- Bakhsh: Forg
- Rural District: Forg

Population (2006)
  - Total: 332
- Time zone: UTC+3:30 (IRST)
  - Summer (DST): UTC+4:30 (IRDT)

Shahrak-e Shahid Rajai (Persian: شهرك شهيد رجايي, also Romanized as Shahrak-e Shahīd Rajāī) is a village in Forg Rural District, Forg District, Darab County, Fars province, Iran. At the 2006 census, its population was 332, in 66 families.
