= Jamsi =

Village in Darab, Iran

Jamsi جمسی
- Village
- Location within Iran
- Coordinates: 28°42′26″N 54°28′29″E
- Country: Iran
- Province: Fars
- County: Darab
- Bakhsh: Central
- Rural District: Hashivar

Population (2006)
  - Total: 1,365
- Time zone: UTC+3:30 (IRST)
  - Summer (DST): UTC+4:30 (IRDT)

Jamsi (Persian: جمسی, also Romanized as Jamsī and Jemsy; also known as Jamshi and Jamshīd) is a village in Hashivar Rural District, in the Central District of Darab County, Fars province, Iran. At the 2006 census, its population was 1,365, in 276 families.

== See also ==
- List of cities, towns and villages in Fars province
