= Javanan =

Javanan جونان
- Village
- Location within Iran
- Coordinates: 28°46′46″N 54°22′30″E
- Country: Iran
- Province: Fars
- County: Darab
- Bakhsh: Central
- Rural District: Paskhan

Population (2006)
  - Total: 766
- Time zone: UTC+3:30 (IRST)
  - Summer (DST): UTC+4:30 (IRDT)

Javanan (Persian: جونان, also Romanized as Javanān and Javānān) is a village in Paskhan Rural District, in the Central District of Darab County, Fars province, Iran. At the 2006 census, its population was 766, in 182 families.
