= Korsiyah =

Korsiyah كرسياه
- Village
- Location within Iran
- Coordinates: 28°45′44″N 54°24′03″E
- Country: Iran
- Province: Fars
- County: Darab
- Bakhsh: Central
- Rural District: Bakhtajerd

Population (2006)
  - Total: 850
- Time zone: UTC+3:30 (IRST)
  - Summer (DST): UTC+4:30 (IRDT)

Korsiyah (Persian: كرسياه, also Romanized as Korsīyāh) is a village in Bakhtajerd Rural District, in the Central District of Darab County, Fars province, Iran. At the 2006 census, its population was 850, in 190 families.
