= Deh Dashti =

Deh Dashti ده دشتي
- Village
- Location within Iran
- Coordinates: 28°32′44″N 54°46′54″E
- Country: Iran
- Province: Fars
- County: Darab
- Bakhsh: Central
- Rural District: Qaleh Biyaban

Population (2006)
  - Total: 32
- Time zone: UTC+3:30 (IRST)
  - Summer (DST): UTC+4:30 (IRDT)

Deh Dashti (Persian: ده دشتي, also Romanized as Deh Dashtī) is a village in Qaleh Biyaban Rural District, in the Central District of Darab County, Fars province, Iran. At the 2006 census, its population was 32, in 10 families.
