= Daranganeh =

Daranganeh درنگانه
- Village
- Location within Iran
- Coordinates: 28°38′29″N 54°19′43″E
- Country: Iran
- Province: Fars
- County: Darab
- Bakhsh: Central
- Rural District: Nasrovan

Population (2006)
  - Total: 772
- Time zone: UTC+3:30 (IRST)
  - Summer (DST): UTC+4:30 (IRDT)

Daranganeh (Persian: درنگانه, also Romanized as Darangāneh; also known as Dalangūneh, Delengāneh, and Delengūneh) is a village in Nasrovan Rural District, in the Central District of Darab County, Fars province, Iran. At the 2006 census, its population was 772, in 158 families.
