= Chek-e Golabi =

Chek-e Golabi چك گلابي
- Village
- Location within Iran
- Coordinates: 28°44′19″N 54°15′09″E
- Country: Iran
- Province: Fars
- County: Darab
- Bakhsh: Central
- Rural District: Fasarud

Population (2006)
  - Total: 267
- Time zone: UTC+3:30 (IRST)
  - Summer (DST): UTC+4:30 (IRDT)

Chek-e Golabi (Persian: چك گلابي, also Romanized as Chek-e Golābī) is a village in Fasarud Rural District, in the Central District of Darab County, Fars province, Iran. At the 2006 census, its population was 267, in 50 families.
