= Khoruslu =

Khoruslu خروسلو
- Village
- Location within Iran
- Coordinates: 28°41′30″N 54°25′31″E
- Country: Iran
- Province: Fars
- County: Darab
- Bakhsh: Central
- Rural District: Nasrovan

Population (2006)
  - Total: 734
- Time zone: UTC+3:30 (IRST)
  - Summer (DST): UTC+4:30 (IRDT)

Khoruslu (Persian: خروسلو, also Romanized as Khorūslū and Khoroosloo; also known as Sākhtemān-e Khorūslū) is a village in Nasrovan Rural District, in the Central District of Darab County, Fars province, Iran. At the 2006 census, its population was 734, in 172 families.
