= Paberkeh =

Paberkeh پابركه
- Village
- Location within Iran
- Coordinates: 28°04′46″N 55°16′25″E
- Country: Iran
- Province: Fars
- County: Darab
- Bakhsh: Forg
- Rural District: Abshur

Population (2006)
  - Total: 13
- Time zone: UTC+3:30 (IRST)
  - Summer (DST): UTC+4:30 (IRDT)

Paberkeh (Persian: پابركه, also Romanized as Pāberkeh) is a village in Abshur Rural District, Forg District, Darab County, Fars province, Iran. At the 2006 census, its population was 13, in 4 families.
