= Gowd Shaneh =

Gowd Shaneh گودشانه
- Village
- Location within Iran
- Coordinates: 28°41′12″N 54°15′31″E
- Country: Iran
- Province: Fars
- County: Darab
- Bakhsh: Central
- Rural District: Fasarud

Population (2006)
  - Total: 510
- Time zone: UTC+3:30 (IRST)
  - Summer (DST): UTC+4:30 (IRDT)

Gowd Shaneh (Persian: گودشانه, also Romanized as Gowd Shāneh) is a village in Fasarud Rural District, in the Central District of Darab County, Fars province, Iran. At the 2006 census, its population was 510, in 109 families.
