= Qanbari, Fasarud =

Sakhteman-e Qanbari ساختمان قنبري
- Village
- Country: Iran
- Province: Fars
- County: Darab
- Bakhsh: Central
- Rural District: Fasarud

Population (2006)
  - Total: 713
- Time zone: UTC+3:30 (IRST)
  - Summer (DST): UTC+4:30 (IRDT)

Sakhteman-e Qanbari (Persian: ساختمان قنبري, also Romanized as Sākhtemān-e Qanbarī) is a village in Fasarud Rural District, in the Central District of Darab County, Fars province, Iran. At the 2006 census, its population was 713, in 149 families.
