= Madevan, Darab =

Village in Fars province, Iran

Madevan Persian: مادوان
- Village
- Location within Iran
- Coordinates: 28°45′13″N 54°15′35″E
- Country: Iran
- Province: Fars
- County: Darab
- District: Fasarud
- Rural District: Fasarud

Population (2016)
  - Total: 1,488
- Time zone: UTC+3:30 (IRST)

Madevan (Persian: مادوان) (Note: Also romanized as Mādavān and Mādevān; also known as Mādehvān) is a village in, and the capital of, Fasarud Rural District of Fasarud District, Darab County, Fars province, Iran.

== Demographics ==
=== Population ===
At the time of the 2006 National Census, the village's population was 1,724 in 427 households, when it was in the Central District. The following census in 2011 counted 1,694 people in 469 households. The 2016 census measured the population of the village as 1,488 people in 467 households. It was the most populous village in its rural district.

After the census, the rural district was separated from the district in the establishment of Fasarud District.
