= Seyl Band =

Seyl Band سيل بند
- Village
- Location within Iran
- Coordinates: 28°33′08″N 54°48′44″E
- Country: Iran
- Province: Fars
- County: Darab
- Bakhsh: Central
- Rural District: Qaleh Biyaban

Population (2006)
  - Total: 233
- Time zone: UTC+3:30 (IRST)
  - Summer (DST): UTC+4:30 (IRDT)

Seyl Band (Persian: سيل بند) is a village in Qaleh Biyaban Rural District, in the Central District of Darab County, Fars province, Iran. At the 2006 census, its population was 233, in 49 families.
