= Atabakhsh-e Ghani =

Atabakhsh-e Ghani عطابخش غني
- Village
- Location within Iran
- Coordinates: 28°45′01″N 54°27′23″E
- Country: Iran
- Province: Fars
- County: Darab
- Bakhsh: Central
- Rural District: Bakhtajerd

Population (2006)
  - Total: 892
- Time zone: UTC+3:30 (IRST)
  - Summer (DST): UTC+4:30 (IRDT)

Atabakhsh-e Ghani (Persian: عطابخش غني, also Romanized as 'Aţābakhsh-e Ghanī; also known as 'Aţābakhsh) is a village in Bakhtajerd Rural District, in the Central District of Darab County, Fars province, Iran. At the 2006 census, its population was 892, in 184 families.
