= Nasirabad, Darab =

Nasirabad نصيراباد
- Village
- Location within Iran
- Coordinates: 28°16′56″N 55°12′45″E
- Country: Iran
- Province: Fars
- County: Darab
- Bakhsh: Forg
- Rural District: Forg

Population (2006)
  - Total: 836
- Time zone: UTC+3:30 (IRST)
  - Summer (DST): UTC+4:30 (IRDT)

Nasirabad (Persian: نصيراباد, also Romanized as Naşīrābād) is a village in Forg Rural District, Forg District, Darab County, Fars province, Iran. At the 2006 census, its population was 836, in 181 families.
