= Navaygan =

Navaygan نوايگان
- Village
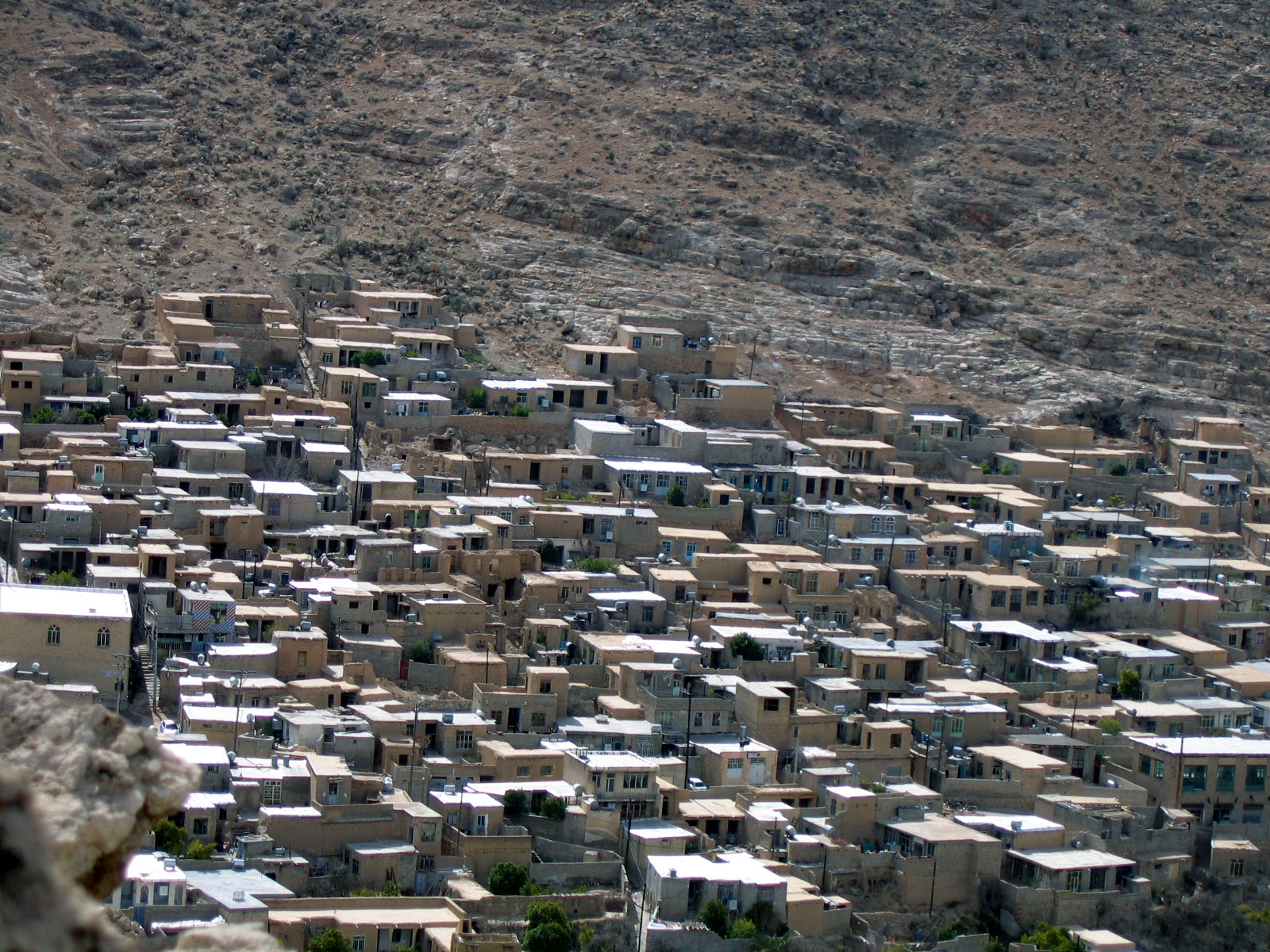

- Location within Iran
- Coordinates: 28°37′37″N 54°53′38″E
- Country: Iran
- Province: Fars
- County: Darab
- Bakhsh: Central
- Rural District: Qaleh Biyaban

Population (2006)
  - Total: 1,712
- Time zone: UTC+3:30 (IRST)
  - Summer (DST): UTC+4:30 (IRDT)

Navaygan (Persian: نوايگان, also Romanized as Navāygān; also known as Nūdāyejān and Nūdāyjān) is a village in Qaleh Biyaban Rural District, in the Central District of Darab County, Fars province, Iran. At the 2006 census, its population was 1,712, in 512 families.
