= Nardeh Shahr =

Nardeh Shahr نرده شهر
- Village
- Location within Iran
- Coordinates: 28°47′10″N 54°29′59″E
- Country: Iran
- Province: Fars
- County: Darab
- Bakhsh: Central
- Rural District: Balesh

Population (2006)
  - Total: 750
- Time zone: UTC+3:30 (IRST)
  - Summer (DST): UTC+4:30 (IRDT)

Nardeh Shahr (Persian: نرده شهر, also Romanized as Nardeh-ye Shahr; also known as Nīdeh Shahr and Nīdshahr) is a village in Balesh Rural District, in the Central District of Darab County, Fars province, Iran. At the 2006 census, its population was 750, in 170 families.
