= Barkuh =

Barkuh (Persian: بركوه) may refer to:

- Bar Kuh, South Khorasan Province
- Barkuh, Fars
- Barkuh, Kerman
- Barkuh Rural District
