= Mohammadabad, Forg =

Mohammadabad محمداباد
- Village
- Location within Iran
- Coordinates: 28°16′59″N 55°13′49″E
- Country: Iran
- Province: Fars
- County: Darab
- Bakhsh: Forg
- Rural District: Forg

Population (2006)
  - Total: 442
- Time zone: UTC+3:30 (IRST)
  - Summer (DST): UTC+4:30 (IRDT)

Mohammadabad (Persian: محمداباد, also Romanized as Moḩammadābād) is a village in Forg Rural District, Forg District, Darab County, Fars province, Iran. At the 2006 census, its population was 442, in 93 families.
