= Shahrak-e Sarollah =

Shahrak-e Sarollah شهرك ثارالله
- Village
- Location within Iran
- Coordinates: 28°44′36″N 54°28′58″E
- Country: Iran
- Province: Fars
- County: Darab
- Bakhsh: Central
- Rural District: Hashivar

Population (2006)
  - Total: 1,269
- Time zone: UTC+3:30 (IRST)
  - Summer (DST): UTC+4:30 (IRDT)

Shahrak-e Sarollah (Persian: شهرك ثارالله, also Romanized as Shahrak-e S̄ārollāh) is a village in Hashivar Rural District, in the Central District of Darab County, Fars province, Iran. At the 2006 census, its population was 1,269, in 243 families.
