= Gowzan =

Gowzan گوزان
- Village
- Location within Iran
- Coordinates: 28°48′23″N 54°27′40″E
- Country: Iran
- Province: Fars
- County: Darab
- Bakhsh: Central
- Rural District: Balesh

Population (2006)
  - Total: 40
- Time zone: UTC+3:30 (IRST)
  - Summer (DST): UTC+4:30 (IRDT)

Gowzan (Persian: گوزان, also Romanized as Gowzān; also known as Gowzūn) is a village in Balesh Rural District, in the Central District of Darab County, Fars province, Iran. At the 2006 census, its population was 40, in 8 families.
