= Dashtollah =

Dashtollah دشت الله
- Village
- Location within Iran
- Coordinates: 28°38′03″N 54°16′43″E
- Country: Iran
- Province: Fars
- County: Darab
- Bakhsh: Central
- Rural District: Nasrovan

Population (2006)
  - Total: 58
- Time zone: UTC+3:30 (IRST)
  - Summer (DST): UTC+4:30 (IRDT)

Dashtollah (Persian: دشت الله, also Romanized as Dashtollāh) is a village in Nasrovan Rural District, in the Central District of Darab County, Fars province, Iran. At the 2006 census, its population was 58, in 10 families.
