= Qaleh-ye Juy =

Qaleh-ye Juy قلعه جوي
- Village
- Country: Iran
- Province: Fars
- County: Darab
- Bakhsh: Central
- Rural District: Balesh

Population (2006)
  - Total: 32
- Time zone: UTC+3:30 (IRST)
  - Summer (DST): UTC+4:30 (IRDT)

Qaleh-ye Juy (Persian: قلعه جوي, also Romanized as Qal‘eh-ye Jūy) is a village in Balesh Rural District, in the Central District of Darab County, Fars province, Iran. At the 2006 census, its population was 32, in 6 families.
