= Ab Javan =

Ab Javan آب جوان
- Village
- Location within Iran
- Coordinates: 28°49′10″N 54°32′04″E
- Country: Iran
- Province: Fars
- County: Darab
- Bakhsh: Central
- Rural District: Balesh

Population (2006)
  - Total: 1,637
- Time zone: UTC+3:30 (IRST)
  - Summer (DST): UTC+4:30 (IRDT)

Ab Javan (Persian: اب جوان, also Romanized as Ab Javān and Ab-e Javān; also known as Āb-e Jahān, Ab Jahan, and Ābjahān) is a village in Balesh Rural District, in the Central District of Darab County, Fars province, Iran. At the 2006 census, its population was 1,637, in 373 families.
