= Shah Abu Zakaria =

Shah Abu Zakaria شاه ابوذكريا
- Village
- Location within Iran
- Coordinates: 28°18′01″N 55°13′48″E
- Country: Iran
- Province: Fars
- County: Darab
- Bakhsh: Forg
- Rural District: Forg

Population (2006)
  - Total: 868
- Time zone: UTC+3:30 (IRST)
  - Summer (DST): UTC+4:30 (IRDT)

Shah Abu Zakaria (Persian: شاه ابوذكريا, also Romanized as Shāh Abū Z̄akarīā, Shāh Abū Zakareyā, and Shāh Abū Zakarīā) is a village in Forg Rural District, Forg District, Darab County, Fars province, Iran. At the 2006 census, its population was 868, in 184 families.
