= Dasht-e Kenar =

Dasht-e Kenar (Persian: دشت کنار) may refer to:

- Dasht-e Kenar, Fars
- Dasht-e Kenar, Darab, Fars province
- Dasht-e Kenar, Hormozgan
- Dasht-e Kenar Rural District, an administrative division of Simorgh County, Mazandaran province
