= Behruzabad-e Sofla =

Behruzabad-e Sofla بهروزابادسفلي
- Village
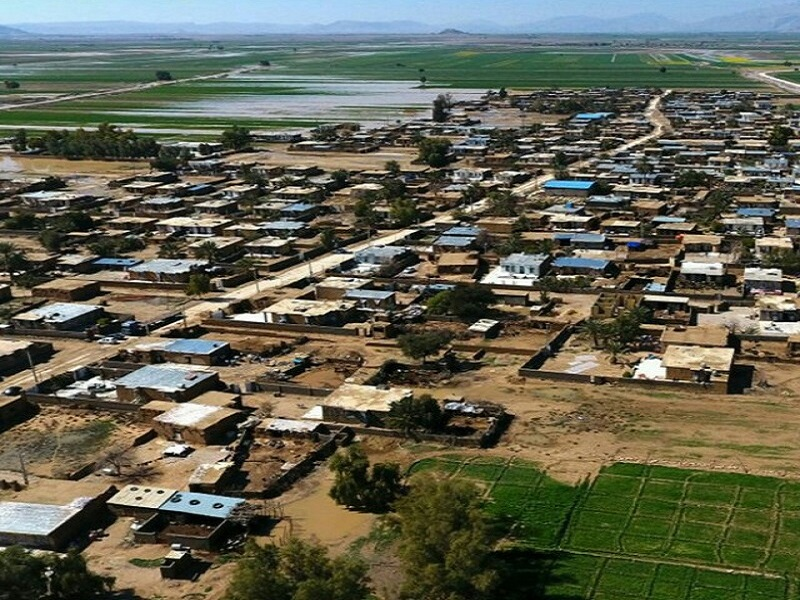

- Location within Iran
- Coordinates: 28°40′17″N 54°34′40″E
- Country: Iran
- Province: Fars
- County: Darab
- Bakhsh: Central
- Rural District: Qaryah ol Kheyr

Population (2006)
  - Total: 868
- Time zone: UTC+3:30 (IRST)
  - Summer (DST): UTC+4:30 (IRDT)

Behruzabad-e Sofla (Persian: بهروزابادسفلي, also Romanized as Behrūzābād-e Soflá; also known as Behrūzābād) is a village in Qaryah ol Kheyr Rural District, in the Central District of Darab County, Fars province, Iran. At the 2006 census, its population was 868, in 178 families.
