= Dasht-e Pirgheyb =

Dasht-e Pirgheyb دشت پيرغيب
- Village
- Location within Iran
- Coordinates: 28°46′13″N 54°13′13″E
- Country: Iran
- Province: Fars
- County: Darab
- Bakhsh: Central
- Rural District: Fasarud

Population (2006)
  - Total: 408
- Time zone: UTC+3:30 (IRST)
  - Summer (DST): UTC+4:30 (IRDT)

Dasht-e Pirgheyb (Persian: دشت پيرغيب, also Romanized as Dasht-e Pīrgheyb) is a village in Fasarud Rural District, in the Central District of Darab County, Fars province, Iran. At the 2006 census, its population was 408, in 88 families.
