= Sadeh, Darab =

Sadeh سده
- Village
- Location within Iran
- Coordinates: 28°17′03″N 55°10′04″E
- Country: Iran
- Province: Fars
- County: Darab
- Bakhsh: Forg
- Rural District: Forg

Population (2006)
  - Total: 626
- Time zone: UTC+3:30 (IRST)
  - Summer (DST): UTC+4:30 (IRDT)

Sadeh (Persian: سده, also Romanized as Sedeh) is a village in Forg Rural District, Forg District, Darab County, Fars province, Iran. At the 2006 census, its population was 626, in 140 families.
