= Shahrak-e Seyyed ol Shohada =

Shahrak-e Seyyed ol Shohada شهرك سيد الشهدا
- Village
- Location within Iran
- Coordinates: 28°50′06″N 54°47′30″E
- Country: Iran
- Province: Fars
- County: Darab
- Bakhsh: Central
- Rural District: Balesh

Population (2006)
  - Total: 189
- Time zone: UTC+3:30 (IRST)
  - Summer (DST): UTC+4:30 (IRDT)

Shahrak-e Seyyed ol Shohada (Persian: شهرك سيد الشهدا, also Romanized as Shahrak-e Seyyed ol Shohadā and Shahrak-e Seyyed Osh Shohadā) is a village in Balesh Rural District, in the Central District of Darab County, Fars province, Iran. At the 2006 census, its population was 189, in 49 families.
