= Gaz Gavban =

Gaz Gavban گزگاوبان
- Village
- Location within Iran
- Coordinates: 28°37′55″N 54°37′14″E
- Country: Iran
- Province: Fars
- County: Darab
- Bakhsh: Central
- Rural District: Qaryah ol Kheyr

Population (2006)
  - Total: 40
- Time zone: UTC+3:30 (IRST)
  - Summer (DST): UTC+4:30 (IRDT)

Gaz Gavban (Persian: گزگاوبان, also Romanized as Gaz Gāvbān, Gaz-e Gāvbān, Gazgāvbān, and Gez-e Gāvbān; also known as Gaz Gāvīān) is a village in Qaryah ol Kheyr Rural District, in the Central District of Darab County, Fars province, Iran. At the 2006 census, its population was 40, in 10 families.
