= Konar-e Hajji-ye Shekari =

Konar-e Hajji-ye Shekari كنارحاجي شكاري
- Village
- Location within Iran
- Coordinates: 28°42′40″N 54°35′21″E
- Country: Iran
- Province: Fars
- County: Darab
- Bakhsh: Central
- Rural District: Hashivar

Population (2006)
  - Total: 467
- Time zone: UTC+3:30 (IRST)
  - Summer (DST): UTC+4:30 (IRDT)

Konar-e Hajji-ye Shekari (Persian: كنارحاجي شكاري, also Romanized as Konār-e Ḩājjī-ye Shekārī; also known as Konār-e Ḩājjī and Konār Ḩājjī) is a village in Hashivar Rural District, in the Central District of Darab County, Fars province, Iran. At the 2006 census, its population was 467, in 103 families.
