= Qaleh Biyaban =

Village in Fars province, Iran

Qaleh Biyaban Persian: قلعه بيابان
- Village
- Location within Iran
- Coordinates: 28°31′40″N 54°52′27″E
- Country: Iran
- Province: Fars
- County: Darab
- District: Jannat
- Rural District: Qaleh Biyaban

Population (2016)
  - Total: 1,657
- Time zone: UTC+3:30 (IRST)

Qaleh Biyaban (Persian: قلعه بيابان) (Note: Also romanized as Qal‘eh Bīābān, Qal’eh Bīyābān, and Qal‘eh-ye Beyābān; also known as Ghal‘eh Biyabān and Qal‘eh-ye Bīābānī) is a village in, and the capital of, Qaleh Biyaban Rural District of Jannat District, Darab County, Fars province, Iran.

== Demographics ==
=== Population ===
At the time of the 2006 National Census, the village's population was 1,198 in 243 households, when it was in the Central District. The following census in 2011 counted 1,381 people in 348 households, by which time the rural district had been separated from the district in the establishment of Jannat District. The 2016 census measured the population of the village as 1,657 people in 482 households. It was the most populous village in its rural district.
