= Morz, Fars =

Village in Fars province, Iran

Morz Persian: مرز
- Village
- Location within Iran
- Coordinates: 28°12′27″N 55°10′12″E
- Country: Iran
- Province: Fars
- County: Darab
- District: Forg
- Rural District: Abshur

Population (2016)
  - Total: 3,632
- Time zone: UTC+3:30 (IRST)

Morz (Persian: مرز) (Note: Also romanized as Marz) is a village in Abshur Rural District of Forg District, Darab County, Fars province, Iran.

== Demographics ==
=== Population ===
At the time of the 2006 National Census, the village's population was 3,512 in 720 households. The following census in 2011 counted 3,660 people in 944 households. The 2016 census measured the population of the village as 3,632 people in 1,004 households. It was the most populous village in its rural district.
