= Sang-e Charak, Fars =

Village in Fars province, Iran

Sang-e Charak Persian: سنگ چارك
- Village
- Location within Iran
- Coordinates: 28°47′10″N 54°32′09″E
- Country: Iran
- Province: Fars
- County: Darab
- District: Central
- Rural District: Balesh

Population (2016)
  - Total: 1,106
- Time zone: UTC+3:30 (IRST)

Sang-e Charak (Persian: سنگ چارك) (Note: Also romanized as Sang Chārak and Sang-e Chārak) is a village in, and the capital of, Balesh Rural District of the Central District of Darab County, Fars province, Iran.

== Demographics ==
=== Population ===
At the time of the 2006 National Census, the village's population was 900 in 217 households. The following census in 2011 counted 952 people in 253 households. The 2016 census measured the population of the village as 1,106 people in 340 households.
