= Doborji =

Doborji or Do Borji (Persian: دوبرجي) may refer to:

- Do Borji, Fars
- Doborji, Kermanshah
