= Shahrak-e Malekabad =

Shahrak-e Malekabad شهرك ملك اباد
- Village
- Interactive map of Shahrak-e Malekabad
- Country: Iran
- Province: Fars
- County: Darab
- Bakhsh: Forg
- Rural District: Forg

Population (2006)
  - Total: 475
- Time zone: UTC+3:30 (IRST)
  - Summer (DST): UTC+4:30 (IRDT)

Shahrak-e Malekabad (Persian: شهرك ملك اباد, also Romanized as Shahrak-e Malekābād) is a village in Forg Rural District, Forg District, Darab County, Fars province, Iran. At the 2006 census, its population was 475, in 91 families.
