= Banuj =

Village in Fars province, Iran

Banuj Persian: بانوج
- Village
- Location within Iran
- Coordinates: 28°39′03″N 54°31′28″E
- Country: Iran
- Province: Fars
- County: Darab
- District: Central
- Rural District: Hashivar

Population (2016)
  - Total: 2,676
- Time zone: UTC+3:30 (IRST)

Banuj (Persian: بانوج) (Note: Also romanized as Bānūj; also known as Banūch and Bāynūj) is a village in Hashivar Rural District of the Central District of Darab County, Fars province, Iran.

== Demographics ==
=== Population ===
At the time of the 2006 National Census, the village's population was 2,402 in 596 households. The following census in 2011 counted 2,623 people in 723 households. The 2016 census measured the population of the village as 2,676 people in 794 households. It was the most populous village in its rural district.
