= Tizab =

Tizab or Tiz Ab (Persian: تيزاب) may refer to:

- Tizab, Fars
- Tiz Ab, Kohgiluyeh and Boyer-Ahmad
- Tizab, Lorestan
- Tiz Ab, Razavi Khorasan
