= Forg =

Forg (Persian: فورگ) may refer to:

- Forg District in Fars Province, Iran
- Forg Rural District in Forg District, Fars Province, Iran

Förg may refer to:

- Günther Förg (1952 – 2013), German painter, graphic designer, sculptor and photographer

FORG may refer to:

- The ticker symbol of ForgeRock
