= Dasht Konar =

Dasht Konar دشتكنار
- Village
- Location within Iran
- Coordinates: 28°04′33″N 55°20′00″E
- Country: Iran
- Province: Fars
- County: Darab
- Bakhsh: Forg
- Rural District: Abshur

Population (2006)
  - Total: 21
- Time zone: UTC+3:30 (IRST)
  - Summer (DST): UTC+4:30 (IRDT)

Dasht Konar (Persian: دشتكنار, also Romanized as Dasht Konār, Dasht-e Kanār, Dasht-e Kenār, Dasht-e Konār, Dasht-i-Kanār, and Dasht Kanār) is a village in Abshur Rural District, Forg District, Darab County, Fars province, Iran. At the 2006 census, its population was 21, in 8 families.
