= Bon Kuyeh =

Bon Kuyeh بن كويه
- Village
- Location within Iran
- Coordinates: 28°09′43″N 55°11′27″E
- Country: Iran
- Province: Fars
- County: Darab
- Bakhsh: Forg
- Rural District: Abshur

Population (2006)
  - Total: 88
- Time zone: UTC+3:30 (IRST)
  - Summer (DST): UTC+4:30 (IRDT)

Bon Kuyeh (Persian: بن كويه, also Romanized as Bon Kūyeh; also known as Boneh-ye Kūyeh, Barkūh, Berkeh Khooni, and Borkūh) is a village in Abshur Rural District, Forg District, Darab County, Fars province, Iran. At the 2006 census, its population was 88, in 16 families.
