= Nasrovan =

Village in Fars province, Iran

Nasrovan Persian: نصروان
- Village
- Location within Iran
- Coordinates: 28°39′53″N 54°23′47″E
- Country: Iran
- Province: Fars
- County: Darab
- District: Central
- Rural District: Nasrovan

Population (2016)
  - Total: 1,061
- Time zone: UTC+3:30 (IRST)

Nasrovan (Persian: نصروان) (Note: Also romanized as Nas̄ārvān, Naşravān, Naşrevān, and Naşrovān) is a village in, and the capital of, Nasrovan Rural District of the Central District of Darab County, Fars province, Iran.

== Demographics ==
=== Population ===
At the time of the 2006 National Census, the village's population was 1,547 in 340 households. The following census in 2011 counted 1,355 people in 366 households. The 2016 census measured the population of the village as 1,061 people in 331 households.
