= Ghiasi =

Ghiasi غياثي
- Village
- Location within Iran
- Coordinates: 28°41′24″N 54°24′00″E
- Country: Iran
- Province: Fars
- County: Darab
- Bakhsh: Central
- Rural District: Fasarud

Population (2006)
  - Total: 518
- Time zone: UTC+3:30 (IRST)
  - Summer (DST): UTC+4:30 (IRDT)

Ghiasi (Persian: غياثي, also Romanized as Ghīās̄ī) is a village in Fasarud Rural District, in the Central District of Darab County, Fars province, Iran. At the 2006 census, its population was 518, in 139 families.
