= Shahrak-e Shohada Ashayir =

Shahrak-e Shohada Ashayir شهرك شهدائ عشاير
- Village
- Location within Iran
- Coordinates: 28°32′16″N 54°51′50″E
- Country: Iran
- Province: Fars
- County: Darab
- Bakhsh: Central
- Rural District: Qaleh Biyaban

Population (2006)
  - Total: 410
- Time zone: UTC+3:30 (IRST)
  - Summer (DST): UTC+4:30 (IRDT)

Shahrak-e Shohada Ashayir (Persian: شهرك شهدائ عشاير, also Romanized as Shahrak-e Shohadā' 'Ashāyīr; also known as Shahrak-e Shohadā) is a village in Qaleh Biyaban Rural District, in the Central District of Darab County, Fars province, Iran. At the 2006 census, its population was 410, in 97 families.
