= Sefid Kuh =

Sefid Kuh (Persian: سفید کوه) may refer to:

- Sefidkuh Rural District, an administrative division of Malayer County, Hamadan province
- Sefid Kuh, Hormozgan, a village in Hormozgan province, Iran
- Sefid Kooh, a mountain in Kermanshah province, Iran
- Sefid Kuh, Mazandaran, a village in Mazandaran province, Iran
- Sefid Kuh, Yazd, a village in Yazd province, Iran

== See also ==
- Safēd Kōh (disambiguation)
- Kuh Sefid (disambiguation)
