= Duban, Iran =

Duban دوبان
- Village
- Location within Iran
- Coordinates: 28°44′54″N 54°30′09″E
- Country: Iran
- Province: Fars
- County: Darab
- Bakhsh: Central
- Rural District: Hashivar

Population (2006)
  - Total: 898
- Time zone: UTC+3:30 (IRST)
  - Summer (DST): UTC+4:30 (IRDT)

Duban (Persian: دوبان, also Romanized as Dūbān) is a village in Hashivar Rural District, in the Central District of Darab County, Fars province, Iran. At the 2006 census, its population was 898, in 197 families.
