= Qalatuyeh =

Qalatuyeh قلاتويه
- Village
- Location within Iran
- Coordinates: 28°11′06″N 55°14′46″E
- Country: Iran
- Province: Fars
- County: Darab
- Bakhsh: Forg
- Rural District: Abshur

Population (2006)
  - Total: 1,568
- Time zone: UTC+3:30 (IRST)
  - Summer (DST): UTC+4:30 (IRDT)

Qalatuyeh (Persian: قلاتويه, also Romanized as Qalātūyeh, Qalātū’īyeh, and Qalātūīyeh; also known as Kalato and Kalātu) is a village in Abshur Rural District, Forg District, Darab County, Fars province, Iran. At the 2006 census, its population was 1,568, in 309 families.
