= Mahal Ahdas-e Sad Rudbal =

Mahal Ahdas-e Sad Rudbal محل احداث سد رودبال
- Village
- Country: Iran
- Province: Fars
- County: Darab
- Bakhsh: Central

Population (2006)
  - Total: 271
- Time zone: UTC+3:30 (IRST)
  - Summer (DST): UTC+4:30 (IRDT)

Mahal Ahdas-e Sad Rudbal (Persian: محل احداث سد رودبال, also Romanized as Maḩal Āḩdās̄-e Sad Rūdbāl) is a village in PolShekesteh, in the Central District of Darab County, Fars province, Iran. At the 2006 census, its population was 271, in 14 families.
