= Qaleh Now, Darab =

Village in Fars province, Iran

Qaleh Now Persian: قلعه نو
- Village
- Location within Iran
- Coordinates: 28°17′39″N 55°12′22″E
- Country: Iran
- Province: Fars
- County: Darab
- District: Forg
- Rural District: Forg

Population (2016)
  - Total: 1,530
- Time zone: UTC+3:30 (IRST)

Qaleh Now (Persian: قلعه نو) (Note: Also romanized as Qal‘eh Now and Qal‘eh-ye Now) is a village in Forg Rural District of Forg District, Darab County, Fars province, Iran.

== Demographics ==
=== Population ===
At the time of the 2006 National Census, the village's population was 1,631 in 343 households. The following census in 2011 counted 1,568 people in 422 households. The 2016 census measured the population of the village as 1,530 people in 474 households. It was the most populous village in its rural district.
