= Kuh Sefid, Fars =

Kuh Sefid كوه سفيد
- Village
- Location within Iran
- Coordinates: 28°39′41″N 54°36′33″E
- Country: Iran
- Province: Fars
- County: Darab
- Bakhsh: Central
- Rural District: Qaryah ol Kheyr

Population (2006)
  - Total: 429
- Time zone: UTC+3:30 (IRST)
  - Summer (DST): UTC+4:30 (IRDT)

Kuh Sefid (Persian: كوه سفيد, also Romanized as Kūh Sefīd) is a village in Qaryah ol Kheyr Rural District, in the Central District of Darab County, Fars province, Iran. At the 2006 census, its population was 429, in 106 families.
