= Pir-e Morad, Fars =

Pir-e Morad پيرمراد
- Village
- Location within Iran
- Coordinates: 28°45′03″N 54°29′23″E
- Country: Iran
- Province: Fars
- County: Darab
- Bakhsh: Central
- Rural District: Hashivar

Population (2006)
  - Total: 420
- Time zone: UTC+3:30 (IRST)
  - Summer (DST): UTC+4:30 (IRDT)

Pir-e Morad (Persian: پيرمراد, also Romanized as Pīr-e Morād) is a village in Hashivar Rural District, in the Central District of Darab County, Fars province, Iran. At the 2006 census, its population was 420, in 90 families.
