= Tang-e Katuiyeh =

Village in Fars province, Iran

Tang-e Katuiyeh Persian: تنگ كتويه
- Village
- Location within Iran
- Coordinates: 28°46′04″N 54°34′53″E
- Country: Iran
- Province: Fars
- County: Darab
- District: Central
- Rural District: Balesh

Population (2016)
  - Total: 4,416
- Time zone: UTC+3:30 (IRST)

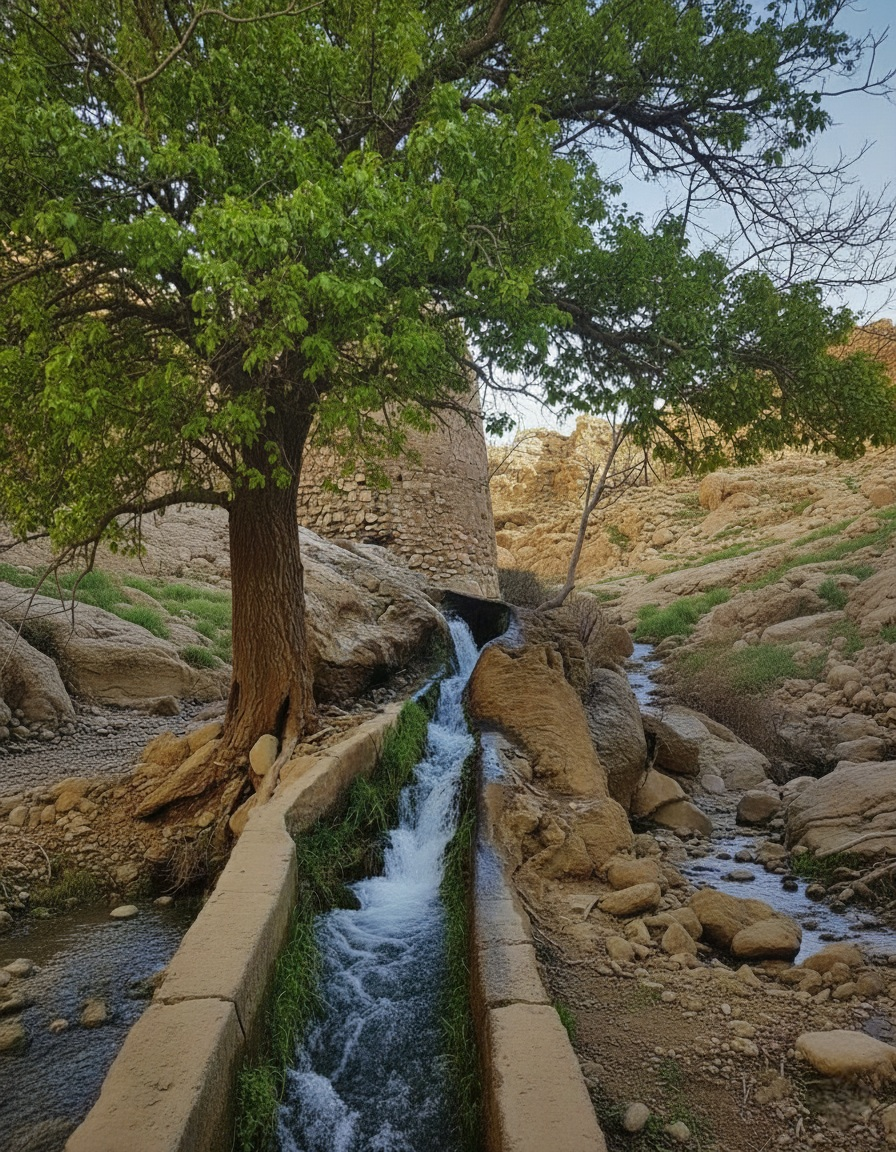
Tang Katuyeh spring and mill, Darab

Tang-e Katuiyeh (Persian: تنگكتويه) (Note: Also romanized as Tang-e Katū’īyeh) is a village in Balesh Rural District of the Central District of Darab County, Fars province, Iran.

== Demographics ==
=== Population ===
At the time of the 2006 National Census, the village's population was 1,848 in 423 households. The following census in 2011 counted 3,224 people in 877 households. The 2016 census measured the population of the village as 4,416 people in 1,290 households. It was the most populous village in its rural district.
