= Shahnan =

Village in Fars province, Iran

Shahnan Persian: شه نان
- Village
- Location within Iran
- Coordinates: 28°43′04″N 54°30′28″E
- Country: Iran
- Province: Fars
- County: Darab
- District: Central
- Rural District: Hashivar

Population (2016)
  - Total: 1,838
- Time zone: UTC+3:30 (IRST)

Shahnan (Persian: شه نان) (Note: Also romanized as Shāh Nān, Shahnān, and Shāhnān) is a village in, and the capital of, Hashivar Rural District of the Central District of Darab County, Fars province, Iran.

== Demographics ==
=== Population ===
At the time of the 2006 National Census, the village's population was 1,756 in 416 households. The following census in 2011 counted 1,903 people in 514 households. The 2016 census measured the population of the village as 1,838 people in 558 households.
