= Herbedan =

Village in Fars province, Iran

Herbedan Persian: هربدان
- Village
- Location within Iran
- Coordinates: 28°39′11″N 54°26′27″E
- Country: Iran
- Province: Fars
- County: Darab
- District: Central
- Rural District: Nasrovan

Population (2016)
  - Total: 1,301
- Time zone: UTC+3:30 (IRST)

Herbedan (Persian: هربدان) (Note: Also romanized as Harbedan and Herbedān; also known as Hermadūn) is a village in Nasrovan Rural District of the Central District of Darab County, Fars province, Iran.

== Demographics ==
=== Population ===
At the time of the 2006 National Census, the village's population was 1,123 in 249 households. The following census in 2011 counted 1,088 people in 297 households. The 2016 census measured the population of the village as 1,301 people in 411 households. It was the most populous village in its rural district.
