= Malekabad, Forg =

Village in Fars, Iran

Malekabad ملك اباد
- Village
- Location within Iran
- Coordinates: 28°19′09″N 55°08′55″E
- Country: Iran
- Province: Fars
- County: Darab
- Bakhsh: Forg
- Rural District: Forg

Population (2006)
  - Total: 78
- Time zone: UTC+3:30 (IRST)
  - Summer (DST): UTC+4:30 (IRDT)

Malekabad (Persian: ملك اباد, also Romanized as Malekābād) is a village in Forg Rural District, Forg District, Darab County, Fars province, Iran. At the 2006 census, its population was 78, in 11 families.
