= Bakhtajerd =

Village in Fars province, Iran

Bakhtajerd Persian: بختاجرد
- Village
- Location within Iran
- Coordinates: 28°44′04″N 54°25′43″E
- Country: Iran
- Province: Fars
- County: Darab
- District: Central
- Rural District: Bakhtajerd

Population (2016)
  - Total: 889
- Time zone: UTC+3:30 (IRST)

Bakhtajerd (Persian: بختاجرد) (Note: Also romanized as Bakhtājerd and Baxtâjerd; also known as Bakhlagird and Bakhlājerd) is a village in, and the capital of, Bakhtajerd Rural District (Note: Formerly Shahijan Rural District) of the Central District of Darab County, Fars province, Iran.

== Demographics ==
=== Population ===
At the time of the 2006 National Census, the village's population was 877 in 201 households. The following census in 2011 counted 1,093 people in 258 households. The 2016 census measured the population of the village as 889 people in 277 households.
