= Shahrak-e Shohada =

Shahrak-e Shohada (Persian: شهرك شهدائ) may refer to:

- Shahrak-e Shohada, Fars
- Shahrak-e Shohada, Khuzestan
