= Ghiasi (disambiguation) =

Ghiasi is a village in Iran. Ghiasi may also refer to

- Morteza Ghiasi, (born 1995), Iranian freestyle wrestler
- Teymour Ghiasi (born 1946), Iranian high jumper
- Vahid Ghiasi (born 1975), Iranian futsal coach and player
