= Duban =

Duban may refer to:

- Duban (character), a character from the One Thousand and One Nights folk tale
- Duban (crater), a crater on Saturn's moon Enceladus
- Duban, Iran, a village in Fars Province, Iran
- Félix Duban (1798 - 1870), a French architect

== See also ==
- Durban
