= Paskhan =

City in Fars province, Iran

Paskhan Persian: پاسخن
- City
- Location within Iran
- Coordinates: 28°47′30″N 54°19′18″E
- Country: Iran
- Province: Fars
- County: Darab
- District: Fasarud

Population (2016)
  - Total: 1,545
- Time zone: UTC+3:30 (IRST)

Paskhan (Persian: پاسخن) (Note: Also romanized as Pāsekhān, Pāskhan, Pāskhān, and Pāsokhan; also known as Pāshkhān) is a city in, and the capital of, Fasarud District of Darab County, Fars province, Iran. It also serves as the administrative center for Paskhan Rural District.

== Demographics ==
=== Population ===
At the time of the 2006 National Census, Paskhan's population was 1,657 in 374 households, when it was in Paskhan Rural District of the Central District. The following census in 2011 counted 1,497 people in 393 households. The 2016 census measured the population of the village as 1,545 people in 476 households.

After the census, the rural district was separated from the district in the formation of Fasarud District. In 2022, Paskhan was elevated to the status of a city.
