= Tizab, Fars =

Village in Fars province, Iran

Tizab Persian: تيزاب
- Village
- Location within Iran
- Coordinates: 28°43′43″N 54°24′25″E
- Country: Iran
- Province: Fars
- County: Darab
- District: Central
- Rural District: Bakhtajerd

Population (2016)
  - Total: 1,609
- Time zone: UTC+3:30 (IRST)

Tizab (Persian: تيزاب) (Note: Also romanized as Tīzāb; also known as Tīr Āb) is a village in Bakhtajerd Rural District (Note: Formerly Shahijan Rural District) of the Central District of Darab County, Fars province, Iran.

== Demographics ==
=== Population ===
At the time of the 2006 National Census, the village's population was 1,547 in 367 households. The following census in 2011 counted 1,666 people in 458 households. The 2016 census measured the population of the village as 1,609 people in 481 households. It was the most populous village in its rural district.
