= Flight 956 =

Flight 956 may refer to

- West Coast Airlines Flight 956, crashed on 1 October 1966
- Iran Air Tours Flight 956, crashed on 12 February 2002
