= Duban (crater) =

Crater on Enceladus

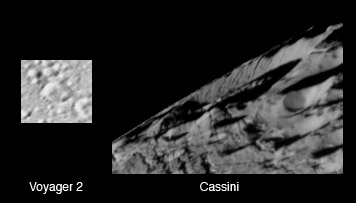
- Voyager 2 and Cassini views of Duban Crater
- Location: 58.38°N 282.91°W
- Diameter: 19 km
- Discoverer: Voyager 2
- Naming: Sage who cured King Yunan of leprosy

Duban is a crater in the northern hemisphere of Saturn's moon Enceladus. Duban was first seen in Voyager 2 images, though the crater has also been seen in much higher resolution Cassini images. It is located at 58.38°N 282.91°W and is 19 kilometers across. In the Cassini image, evidence for significant tectonic deformation can be seen along the northwest rim of the crater.

Duban is named after a sage who cured King Yunan of leprosy in Arabian Nights.
