= Qaleh-ye Now, Arak =

Village in Markazi province, Iran

Qaleh-ye Now Persian: قلعه نو
- Village
- Location within Iran
- Coordinates: 34°05′51″N 49°55′03″E
- Country: Iran
- Province: Markazi
- County: Arak
- District: Masumiyeh
- Rural District: Masumiyeh

Population (2016)
  - Total: 746
- Time zone: UTC+3:30 (IRST)

Qaleh-ye Now (Persian: قلعه نو) is a village in Masumiyeh Rural District of Masumiyeh District in Arak County, Markazi province, Iran.

== Demographics ==
=== Population ===
At the time of the 2006 National Census, the village's population was 787 in 231 households, when it was in the Central District. The following census in 2011 counted 823 people in 257 households, by which time the rural district had been separated from the district in the formation of Masumiyeh District. The 2016 census measured the population of the village as 746 people in 252 households.
