= Jannat Shahr =

City in Fars province, Iran

Jannat Shahr Persian: جنت شهر
- City
- Location within Iran
- Coordinates: 28°39′18″N 54°41′04″E
- Country: Iran
- Province: Fars
- County: Darab
- District: Jannat

Population (2016)
  - Total: 13,598
- Time zone: UTC+3:30 (IRST)

Jannat Shahr (Persian: جنت شهر) (Note: Also known as Jannat and Kūshk-e Jannat) is a city in, and the capital of, Jannat District of Darab County, Fars province, Iran.

== Demographics ==
=== Population ===
At the time of the 2006 National Census, the city's population was 10,817 in 2,373 households, when it was in the Central District. The following census in 2011 counted 11,852 people in 3,082 households, by which time the city had been separated from the district in the formation of Jannat District. The 2016 census measured the population of the city as 13,598 people in 3,964 households.
