= Malekabad, Rostaq =

Malekabad ملك اباد
- Village
- Location within Iran
- Coordinates: 28°29′36″N 55°19′48″E
- Country: Iran
- Province: Fars
- County: Darab
- Bakhsh: Rostaq
- Rural District: Kuhestan

Population (2006)
  - Total: 33
- Time zone: UTC+3:30 (IRST)
  - Summer (DST): UTC+4:30 (IRDT)

Malekabad (Persian: ملك اباد, also Romanized as Malekābād) is a village in Kuhestan Rural District, Rostaq District, Darab County, Fars province, Iran. At the 2006 census, its population was 33, in 8 families.
