= Iran Airtour Flight 956 =

2002 plane crash near Kermanshah, Iran

Iran Air Tours Flight 956
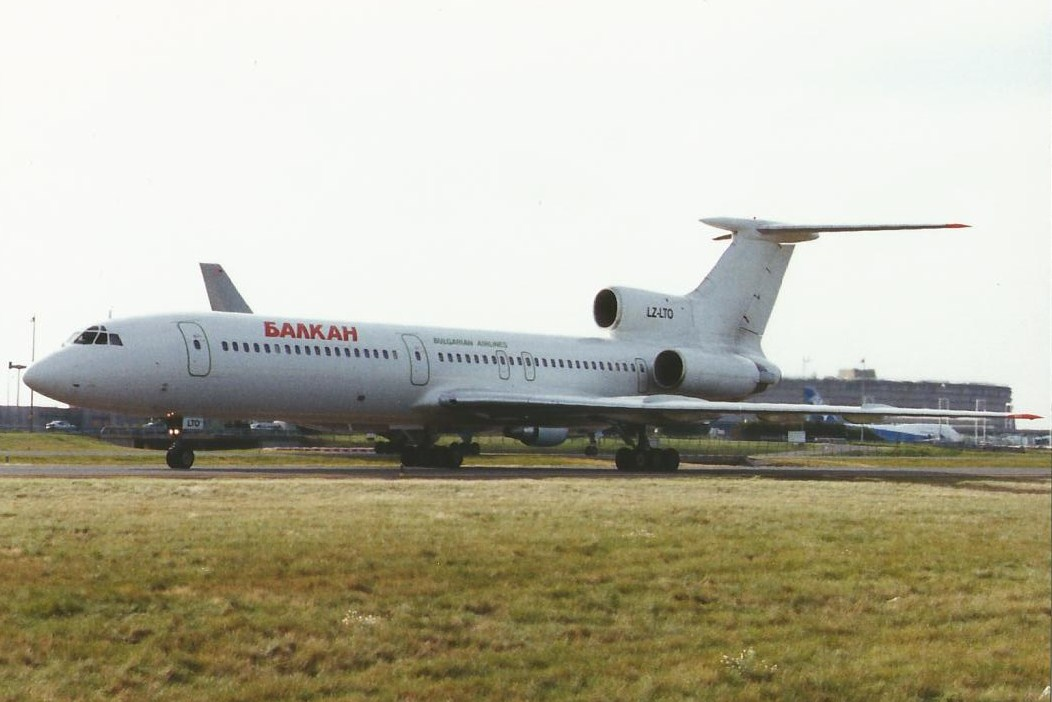
- The Iran Air Tours Tu-154 involved in the accident, while in service with Balkan Bulgarian Airlines

Accident
- Date: 12 February 2002
- Summary: Controlled flight into terrain in poor visibility
- Site: Mount Sefid Kuh, Kermanshah, Iran; 33.4667°N 48.3500°E

Aircraft
- Aircraft type: Tupolev Tu-154M
- Operator: Iran Air Tours
- IATA flight No.: B9956
- ICAO flight No.: IRB956
- Call sign: IRAN AIRTOUR 956
- Registration: EP-MBS
- Flight origin: Tehran-Mehrabad Airport Tehran, Iran
- Destination: Khorramabad Airport, Khorramabad, Iran
- Occupants: 119
- Passengers: 107
- Crew: 12
- Fatalities: 119
- Survivors: 0

Iran Air Tours Flight 956 was a Tupolev Tu-154M which crashed 230 miles (370 km) south-west of Tehran on 12 February 2002. During a non precision approach to runway 11 of Khorramabad Airport, the airliner impacted the Kuh-e Sefid Mountain at an altitude of 9,100 feet (2,800 m), three nautical miles (5.6 km; 3.5 mi) left of the runway centerline. All 12 crew and 107 passengers were killed in the crash. The aircraft was carrying four government officials. It remains the 5th worst plane crash in Iranian history.

== Aircraft ==
The aircraft was a TU-154M, which made its first flight on 21 May 1991. On 21 January 2002, the airliner was subleased by BAC to Iran Airtour, and the registration changed to EP-MBS. In total, by the day of the accident, the aircraft had accumulated 12,701 hours of flight time and 5516 cycles. It was equipped with three Soloviev D-30KU-154 turbofan engines.

== Crash ==
Flight 956 of Iran Air Tours departed from Tehran to Khorramabad at 7:30 a.m. with 12 crew members and 107 passengers on board. Among the passengers were 4 government officials and at least 4 Spanish passengers. The landing was carried out in bad weather conditions, with the crew deviating 3 kilometres (1.9 mi; 1.6 nmi) from the left axis of the runway. Approximately 15 miles (24 km; 13 nmi) from the airport, at an altitude of 9,100 feet (2,800 m) above sea level, the Tu-154 crashed into the Kuh-e Sefid mountain near the village of Sarab-e Dowreh and exploded. All 119 occupants on board were killed. Firstly, newspapers mistakenly indicated 117 dead. It is said that the aircraft could not perform the required IFR approach due to the airport not having the Soviet style navigation aides and was performing a VFR approach instead in bad weather conditions. Based on the CVR, the copilot warned the captain of the aircraft warnings but was ignored because of captain's over-confidence.

== Aftermath ==
Shortly after the accident there were calls for the resignation or dismissal of Transport Minister, Ahmad Khorram, as well as the head of the civil aviation organization Behzad Mazheri. About 150 deputies wrote a letter to President Mohammad Khatami, asking him to take the necessary measures to investigate the causes of the accident.

Another reason cited for the catastrophe was the American sanctions against Iran, which prevented Iranian airlines from sourcing spare parts for Boeing aircraft purchased before the 1979 Iranian Revolution. They were forced instead to operate aging post-Soviet era aircraft. Iran Air Tours announced that it was ceasing to operate Tupolev aircraft, but this action was never implemented.
