= Masumiyeh =

Village in Markazi province, Iran

Masumiyeh Persian: معصوميه
- Village
- Location within Iran
- Coordinates: 34°05′18″N 49°54′22″E
- Country: Iran
- Province: Markazi
- County: Arak
- District: Masumiyeh
- Rural District: Masumiyeh

Population (2016)
  - Total: 1,953
- Time zone: UTC+3:30 (IRST)

Masumiyeh (Persian: معصوميه) (Note: Also romanized as Ma‘şūmīyeh; formerly known as Shahveh; also known as Shabeh) is a village in, and the capital of, Masumiyeh Rural District in Masumiyeh District of Arak County, Markazi province, Iran.

== Demographics ==
=== Population ===
At the time of the 2006 National Census, the village's population was 2,101 in 625 households, when it was in the Central District. The following census in 2011 counted 2,134 people in 677 households, by which time the rural district had been separated from the district in the formation of Masumiyeh District. The 2016 census measured the population of the village as 1,953 people in 692 households.
