= Mutabad =

Village in Markazi province, Iran

Mutabad Persian: موت اباد
- Village
- Location within Iran
- Coordinates: 34°06′10″N 49°50′30″E
- Country: Iran
- Province: Markazi
- County: Arak
- District: Masumiyeh
- Rural District: Masumiyeh

Population (2016)
  - Total: 429
- Time zone: UTC+3:30 (IRST)

Mutabad (Persian: موت اباد) (Note: Also romanized as Mowt Abad and Mūtābād) is a village in Masumiyeh Rural District of Masumiyeh District in Arak County, Markazi province, Iran.

== Demographics ==
=== Population ===
At the time of the 2006 National Census, the village's population was 555 in 175 households, when it was in the Central District. The following census in 2011 counted 433 people in 148 households, by which time the rural district had been separated from the district in the formation of Masumiyeh District. The 2016 census measured the population of the village as 429 people in 151 households.
