= Masumiyeh Rural District =

Rural district in Markazi province, Iran

Masumiyeh Rural District Persian: دهستان معصوميه
- Rural District
- Location within Iran
- Coordinates: 34°07′N 49°57′E
- Country: Iran
- Province: Markazi
- County: Arak
- District: Masumiyeh
- Established: 1987
- Capital: Masumiyeh

Population (2016)
  - Total: 5,697
- Time zone: UTC+3:30 (IRST)

Masumiyeh Rural District (Persian: دهستان معصوميه) is in Masumiyeh District of Arak County, Markazi province, Iran. Its capital is the village of Masumiyeh.

== Demographics ==
=== Population ===
At the time of the 2006 National Census, the rural district's population (as a part of the Central District) was 11,453 in 3,212 households. There were 5,859 inhabitants in 1,830 households at the following census of 2011, by which time the rural district had been separated from the district in the formation of Masumiyeh District. The 2016 census measured the population of the rural district as 5,697 in 1,907 households. The most populous of its 12 villages was Malekabad, with 2,536 people.

=== Other villages in the rural district ===
- Mutabad
- Qaleh-ye Now
