= Sabluiyeh, Zarand =

Sabluiyeh سبلوييه
- Village
- Location within Iran
- Coordinates: 30°34′12″N 56°24′12″E
- Country: Iran
- Province: Kerman
- County: Zarand
- Bakhsh: Central
- Rural District: Jorjafak

Population (2006)
  - Total: 66
- Time zone: UTC+3:30 (IRST)
  - Summer (DST): UTC+4:30 (IRDT)

Sabluiyeh (Persian: سبلوييه, also Romanized as Sablū’īyeh, Sabaloo’eyeh, and Soblū’īyeh; also known as Bārkūh, Gonguk, and Sublu) is a village in Jorjafak Rural District, in the Central District of Zarand County, Kerman Province, Iran. At the 2006 census, its population was 66, in 27 families.
