= Malekabad, Anbarabad =

Village in Kerman, Iran

Malekabad ملك اباد
- Village
- Location within Iran
- Coordinates: 28°20′08″N 58°06′18″E
- Country: Iran
- Province: Kerman
- County: Anbarabad
- Bakhsh: Jebalbarez-e Jonubi
- Rural District: Mardehek

Population (2006)
  - Total: 492
- Time zone: UTC+3:30 (IRST)
  - Summer (DST): UTC+4:30 (IRDT)

Malekabad (Persian: ملك اباد, also Romanized as Malekābād; also known as Malikābād) is a village in Mardehek Rural District, Jebalbarez-e Jonubi District, Anbarabad County, Kerman Province, Iran. At the 2006 census, its population was 492, in 112 families.
