= Malekabad, Kurdistan =

Malekabad ملك آباد
- Village
- Location within Iran
- Coordinates: 35°23′57″N 47°38′12″E
- Country: Iran
- Province: Kurdistan
- County: Qorveh
- Bakhsh: Serishabad
- Rural District: Lak

Population (2006)
  - Total: 228
- Time zone: UTC+3:30 (IRST)
  - Summer (DST): UTC+4:30 (IRDT)

Malekabad (Persian: ملك آباد, also Romanized as Malekābād and Malakābād; also known as Mallākābād) is a village in Lak Rural District, Serishabad District, Qorveh County, Kurdistan Province, Iran. At the 2006 census, its population was 228, in 52 families. The village is populated by Kurds.
