= Bar Kuh =

Bar Kuh بركوه
- Village
- Location within Iran
- Coordinates: 32°31′55″N 59°39′37″E
- Country: Iran
- Province: South Khorasan
- County: Sarbisheh
- Bakhsh: Central
- Rural District: Momenabad

Population (2006)
  - Total: 185
- Time zone: UTC+3:30 (IRST)
  - Summer (DST): UTC+4:30 (IRDT)

Bar Kuh (Persian: بركوه, also Romanized as Bār Kūh, Bar-e Kūh, Barkooh, and Barkūh) is a village in Momenabad Rural District, in the Central District of Sarbisheh County, South Khorasan Province, Iran. According to the 2006 census, it had a population of 185 in 61 families.
