= Ab Shur, Kerman =

Ab Shur ابشور
- Village
- Location within Iran
- Coordinates: 28°47′14″N 57°10′17″E
- Country: Iran
- Province: Kerman
- County: Jiroft
- Bakhsh: Central
- Rural District: Esfandaqeh

Population (2006)
  - Total: 453
- Time zone: UTC+3:30 (IRST)
  - Summer (DST): UTC+4:30 (IRDT)

Ab Shur (Persian: ابشور, also Romanized as Āb Shūr and Ab Shoor) is a village in Esfandaqeh Rural District, in the Central District of Jiroft County, Kerman province, Iran. At the 2006 census, its population was 453, in 94 families.
