= Kelituiyeh =

Kelituiyeh كليتو ئيه
- Village
- Location within Iran
- Coordinates: 28°01′51″N 56°45′17″E
- Country: Iran
- Province: Hormozgan
- County: Hajjiabad
- Bakhsh: Ahmadi
- Rural District: Kuh Shah

Population (2006)
  - Total: 162
- Time zone: UTC+3:30 (IRST)
  - Summer (DST): UTC+4:30 (IRDT)

Kelituiyeh (Persian: كليتو ئيه, also Romanized as Kelītū’īyeh and Kalītūyeh; also known as Chehchoo, Kalato, Kalātū, Kelātū, and Kelī Tū) is a village in Kuh Shah Rural District, Ahmadi District, Hajjiabad County, Hormozgan Province, Iran. At the 2006 census, its population was 162, in 41 families.
