= Dasht-e Kenar, Hormozgan =

Dasht-e Kenar دشت كنار
- Village
- Country: Iran
- Province: Hormozgan
- County: Hajjiabad
- Bakhsh: Central
- Rural District: Tarom

Population (2006)
  - Total: 14
- Time zone: UTC+3:30 (IRST)
  - Summer (DST): UTC+4:30 (IRDT)

Dasht-e Kenar (Persian: دشت كنار, also Romanized as Dasht-e Kenār) is a village in Tarom Rural District, in the Central District of Hajjiabad County, Hormozgan Province, Iran. At the 2006 census, its population was 14, in 5 families.
