= Malekabad, Rafsanjan =

Malekabad ملك آباد
- Village
- Location within Iran
- Coordinates: 30°26′42″N 56°04′11″E
- Country: Iran
- Province: Kerman
- County: Rafsanjan
- Bakhsh: Central
- Rural District: Qasemabad

Population (2006)
  - Total: 663
- Time zone: UTC+3:30 (IRST)
  - Summer (DST): UTC+4:30 (IRDT)

Malekabad (Persian: ملك آباد, also Romanized as Malekābād; also known as Malekābād-e Bālā, Malekābād-e ‘Olyā, Malikābād, and Melkābād-e ‘Olyā) is a village in Qasemabad Rural District, in the Central District of Rafsanjan County, Kerman Province, Iran. At the 2006 census, its population was 663, in 167 families.
