= Do Borji, Fars =

City in Fars province, Iran

Do Borji Persian: دوبرجي
- City
- Location within Iran
- Coordinates: 28°18′27″N 55°11′34″E
- Country: Iran
- Province: Fars
- County: Darab
- District: Forg

Population (2016)
  - Total: 2,907
- Time zone: UTC+3:30 (IRST)

Do Borji (Persian: دوبرجي) (Note: Also romanized as Do Borjī) is a city in, and the capital of, Forg District of Darab County, Fars province, Iran. It also serves as the administrative center for Forg Rural District.

== Demographics ==
=== Population ===
At the time of the 2006 National Census, Do Borji's population was 2,500 in 548 households, when it was a village in Forg Rural District. The following census in 2011 counted 2,651 people in 694 households, by which time the village had been elevated to the status of a city. The 2016 census measured the population of the city as 2,907 people in 859 households.
