= Malekabad, Arzhan =

Malekabad ملكاباد
- Village
- Location within Iran
- Coordinates: 29°38′02″N 52°09′39″E
- Country: Iran
- Province: Fars
- County: Shiraz
- Bakhsh: Arzhan
- Rural District: Qarah Chaman

Population (2006)
  - Total: 85
- Time zone: UTC+3:30 (IRST)
  - Summer (DST): UTC+4:30 (IRDT)

Malekabad (Persian: ملكاباد, also Romanized as Malekābād; also known as Qal‘eh-i-Malakābād and Qal‘eh-ye Malekābād) is a village in Qarah Chaman Rural District, Arzhan District, Shiraz County, Fars province, Iran. At the 2006 census, its population was 85, in 16 families.
