= Abshur, Hormozgan =

Abshur آبشور
- Village
- Location within Iran
- Coordinates: 27°48′56″N 56°35′59″E
- Country: Iran
- Province: Hormozgan
- County: Bandar Abbas
- Bakhsh: Fin
- Rural District: Siyahu

Population (2006)
  - Total: 66
- Time zone: UTC+3:30 (IRST)
  - Summer (DST): UTC+4:30 (IRDT)

Abshur (Persian: آبشور, also Romanized as Ābshūr) is a village in Siyahu Rural District, Fin District, Bandar Abbas County, Hormozgan Province, Iran. At the 2006 census, its population was 66, in 20 families.
