= Kalatu, Rudan =

Kalatu كلاتو
- Village
- Location within Iran
- Coordinates: 27°22′32″N 57°19′08″E
- Country: Iran
- Province: Hormozgan
- County: Rudan
- Bakhsh: Central
- Rural District: Abnama

Population (2006)
  - Total: 63
- Time zone: UTC+3:30 (IRST)
  - Summer (DST): UTC+4:30 (IRDT)

Kalatu (Persian: كلاتو, also Romanized as Kalātū) is a village in Abnama Rural District, in the Central District of Rudan County, Hormozgan Province, Iran. At the 2006 census, its population was 63, in 15 families.
