= Malekabad, Jiroft =

Malekabad ملكاباد
- Village
- Location within Iran
- Coordinates: 28°38′43″N 57°44′21″E
- Country: Iran
- Province: Kerman
- County: Jiroft
- Bakhsh: Central
- Rural District: Halil

Population (2006)
  - Total: 223
- Time zone: UTC+3:30 (IRST)
  - Summer (DST): UTC+4:30 (IRDT)

Malekabad (Persian: ملكاباد, also Romanized as Malekābād) is a village in Halil Rural District, in the Central District of Jiroft County, Kerman Province, Iran. At the 2006 census, its population was 223, in 52 families.
