= Malekabad, Kermanshah =

Village in Kermanshah, Iran

Malekabad ملك اباد
- Village
- Location within Iran
- Coordinates: 34°39′52″N 47°45′56″E
- Country: Iran
- Province: Kermanshah
- County: Sonqor
- Bakhsh: Central
- Rural District: Parsinah

Population (2006)
  - Total: 50
- Time zone: UTC+3:30 (IRST)
  - Summer (DST): UTC+4:30 (IRDT)

Malekabad (Persian: ملك اباد, also Romanized as Malekābād) is a village in Parsinah Rural District, in the Central District of Sonqor County, Kermanshah Province, Iran. At the 2006 census, its population was 50, in 9 families.
