= Malekabad, Bazoft =

Malekabad مالك اباد
- Village
- Location within Iran
- Coordinates: 32°11′12″N 50°17′19″E
- Country: Iran
- Province: Chaharmahal and Bakhtiari
- County: Kuhrang
- Bakhsh: Bazoft
- Rural District: Doab

Population (2006)
  - Total: 65
- Time zone: UTC+3:30 (IRST)
  - Summer (DST): UTC+4:30 (IRDT)

Malekabad (Persian: مالك اباد, also Romanized as Mālekābād) is a village in Doab Rural District, Bazoft District, Kuhrang County, Chaharmahal and Bakhtiari Province, Iran. At the 2006 census, its population was 65, in 15 families. The village is populated by Lurs.
