= Dasht-e Kenar, Fars =

Dasht-e Kenar دشت کنار
- Village
- Location within Iran
- Coordinates: 30°17′40″N 52°25′49″E
- Country: Iran
- Province: Fars
- County: Marvdasht
- Bakhsh: Dorudzan
- Rural District: Dorudzan

Population (2006)
  - Total: 54
- Time zone: UTC+3:30 (IRST)
  - Summer (DST): UTC+4:30 (IRDT)

Dasht-e Kenar (Persian: دشت کنار, also Romanized as Dasht-e Kenār) is a village in Dorudzan Rural District, Dorudzan District, Marvdasht County, Fars province, Iran. At the 2006 census, its population was 54, in 14 families.
