= Doborji, Kermanshah =

Doborji دوبرجي
- Village
- Location within Iran
- Coordinates: 34°06′48″N 47°04′55″E
- Country: Iran
- Province: Kermanshah
- County: Kermanshah
- Bakhsh: Firuzabad
- Rural District: Sar Firuzabad

Population (2006)
  - Total: 78
- Time zone: UTC+3:30 (IRST)
  - Summer (DST): UTC+4:30 (IRDT)

Doborji (Persian: دوبرجي, also Romanized as Doborjī; also known as Sefīd Do Borjī) is a village in Sar Firuzabad Rural District, Firuzabad District, Kermanshah County, Kermanshah Province, Iran. At the 2006 census, its population was 78, in 18 families.
