= Kuh Sefid, Kerman =

Kuh Sefid كوه سفيد
- Village
- Location within Iran
- Coordinates: 29°16′34″N 56°48′05″E
- Country: Iran
- Province: Kerman
- County: Rabor
- Bakhsh: Central
- Rural District: Rabor

Population (2006)
  - Total: 158
- Time zone: UTC+3:30 (IRST)
  - Summer (DST): UTC+4:30 (IRDT)

Kuh Sefid (Persian: كوه سفيد, also Romanized as Kūh Sefīd and Kūh-e Sefīd) is a village in Rabor Rural District, in the Central District of Rabor County, Kerman Province, Iran. At the 2006 census, its population was 158, in 45 families.
