= Malekabad, Kerman =

Malekabad ملكاباد
- Village
- Location within Iran
- Coordinates: 30°31′38″N 57°47′39″E
- Country: Iran
- Province: Kerman
- County: Kerman
- Bakhsh: Shahdad
- Rural District: Takab

Population (2006)
  - Total: 99
- Time zone: UTC+3:30 (IRST)
  - Summer (DST): UTC+4:30 (IRDT)

Malekabad (Persian: ملكاباد, also Romanized as Malekābād) is a village in Takab Rural District, Shahdad District, Kerman County, Kerman Province, Iran. At the 2006 census, its population was 99, in 24 families.
