= Fadami =

City in Fars province, Iran

Fadami Persian: فدامي
- City
- Location within Iran
- Coordinates: 28°12′54″N 55°08′03″E
- Country: Iran
- Province: Fars
- County: Darab
- District: Forg

Population (2016)
  - Total: 4,097
- Time zone: UTC+3:30 (IRST)

Fadami (Persian: فدامي) (Note: Also romanized as Fadāmī; also known as Āb-e Shūr, Fadāmī Āb-e Shūr, and Padūmi) is a city in Forg District of Darab County, Fars province, Iran, serving as the administrative center for Abshur Rural District.

== Demographics ==
=== Population ===
At the time of the 2006 National Census, Fadami's population was 4,087 in 826 households, when it was a village in Abshur Rural District. The following census in 2011 counted 4,028 people in 990 households, by which time the village had been elevated to the status of a city. The 2016 census measured the population of the city as 4,097 people in 1,136 households.
