= Malekabad, Shiraz =

Village in Fars, Iran

Malekabad ملك اباد
- Village
- Location within Iran
- Coordinates: 29°43′00″N 52°58′20″E
- Country: Iran
- Province: Fars
- County: Shiraz
- Bakhsh: Zarqan
- Rural District: Band-e Amir

Population (2006)
  - Total: 185
- Time zone: UTC+3:30 (IRST)
  - Summer (DST): UTC+4:30 (IRDT)

Malekabad (Persian: ملك اباد, also Romanized as Malekābād; also known as Malekābād-e Korbāl and Malek Abad Korbal) is a village in Band-e Amir Rural District, Zarqan District, Shiraz County, Fars province, Iran. At the 2006 census, its population was 185, in 49 families.
