= Kuh Sefid-e Sofla =

Village in Razavi Khorasan, Iran

Kuh Sefid-e Sofla كوه سفيدسفلي
- Village
- Location within Iran
- Coordinates: 35°46′42″N 60°27′17″E
- Country: Iran
- Province: Razavi Khorasan
- County: Mashhad
- Bakhsh: Razaviyeh
- Rural District: Pain Velayat

Population (2006)
  - Total: 125
- Time zone: UTC+3:30 (IRST)
  - Summer (DST): UTC+4:30 (IRDT)

Kuh Sefid-e Sofla (Persian: كوه سفيدسفلي, also Romanized as Kūh Sefīd-e Soflá; also known as Kūh Sefīd-e Pā’īn) is a village in Pain Velayat Rural District, Razaviyeh District, Mashhad County, Razavi Khorasan Province, Iran. At the 2006 census, its population was 125, in 28 families.
