= Pir Morad, West Azerbaijan =

Pir Morad پيرمراد
- Village
- Location within Iran
- Coordinates: 37°36′50″N 45°01′12″E
- Country: Iran
- Province: West Azerbaijan
- County: Urmia
- Bakhsh: Central
- Rural District: Rowzeh Chay

Population (2006)
  - Total: 154
- Time zone: UTC+3:30 (IRST)
  - Summer (DST): UTC+4:30 (IRDT)

Pir Morad (Persian: پيرمراد, also Romanized as Pīr Morād and Pīrmorād) is a village in Rowzeh Chay Rural District, in the Central District of Urmia County, West Azerbaijan Province, Iran. At the 2006 census, its population was 154, in 43 families.
