= Puzeh-ye Tiz Ab Safer =

Puzeh-ye Tiz Ab Safer پوزه تيزاب صفر
- Village
- Location within Iran
- Coordinates: 30°58′59″N 51°00′09″E
- Country: Iran
- Province: Kohgiluyeh and Boyer-Ahmad
- County: Boyer-Ahmad
- Bakhsh: Ludab
- Rural District: Chin

Population (2006)
  - Total: 13
- Time zone: UTC+3:30 (IRST)
  - Summer (DST): UTC+4:30 (IRDT)

Puzeh-ye Tiz Ab Safer (Persian: پوزه تيزاب صفر, also Romanized as Pūzeh-ye Tīz Āb Şafer; also known as Pūzeh-ye Tīz Āb and Tīz Āb) is a village in Chin Rural District, Ludab District, Boyer-Ahmad County, Kohgiluyeh and Boyer-Ahmad Province, Iran. At the 2006 census, its population was 13, in 4 families.
