= Malekabad, Arak =

Village in Markazi province, Iran

Malekabad Persian: ملكاباد
- Village
- Location within Iran
- Coordinates: 34°05′12″N 49°52′37″E
- Country: Iran
- Province: Markazi
- County: Arak
- District: Masumiyeh
- Rural District: Masumiyeh

Population (2016)
  - Total: 2,536
- Time zone: UTC+3:30 (IRST)

Malekabad (Persian: ملكاباد) (Note: Also romanized as Malakābād, Malekābād, and Malkābād) is a village in Masumiyeh Rural District of Masumiyeh District in Arak County, Markazi province, Iran.

== Demographics ==
=== Population ===
At the time of the 2006 National Census, the village's population was 2,440 in 673 households, when it was in the Central District. The following census in 2011 counted 2,469 people in 748 households, by which time the rural district had been separated from the district in the formation of Masumiyeh District. The 2016 census measured the population of the village as 2,536 people in 800 households, the most populous in its rural district.
