= Kalatu, Bandar Lengeh =

Kalatu كلاتو
- Village
- Location within Iran
- Coordinates: 26°53′10″N 55°14′37″E
- Country: Iran
- Province: Hormozgan
- County: Bandar Lengeh
- Bakhsh: Central
- Rural District: Dezhgan

Population (2006)
  - Total: 108
- Time zone: UTC+3:30 (IRST)
  - Summer (DST): UTC+4:30 (IRDT)

Kalatu (Persian: كلاتو, also Romanized as Kalātū) is a village in Dezhgan Rural District, in the Central District of Bandar Lengeh County, Hormozgan Province, Iran. At the 2006 census, its population was 108, in 21 families.
