= Malekabad-e Yek =

Village in Chaharmahal and Bakhtiari, Iran

Malekabad-e Yek ملک اباد1
- Village
- Location within Iran
- Coordinates: 32°11′37″N 50°16′54″E
- Country: Iran
- Province: Chaharmahal and Bakhtiari
- County: Kuhrang
- Bakhsh: Central
- Rural District: Shurab-e Tangazi

Population (2006)
  - Total: 43
- Time zone: UTC+3:30 (IRST)
  - Summer (DST): UTC+4:30 (IRDT)

Malekabad-e Yek (Persian: ملک اباد1, also Romanized as Mālekābād-e Yek; also known as Mālekābād) is a village in Shurab-e Tangazi Rural District, in the Central District of Kuhrang County, Chaharmahal and Bakhtiari Province, Iran. At the 2006 census, its population was 43, in 9 families. The village is populated by Lurs.
