= Sefid Kuh, Hormozgan =

Sefid Kuh سفيد كوه
- Village
- Interactive map of Sefid Kuh
- Country: Iran
- Province: Hormozgan
- County: Minab
- Bakhsh: Senderk
- Rural District: Dar Pahn

Population (2006)
  - Total: 81
- Time zone: UTC+3:30 (IRST)
  - Summer (DST): UTC+4:30 (IRDT)

Sefid Kuh (Persian: سفيد كوه, also Romanized as Sefīd Kūh) is a village in Dar Pahn Rural District, Senderk District, Minab County, Hormozgan Province, Iran. At the 2006 census, its population was 81, in 18 families.
