= Malekabad, Delfan =

Village in Lorestan province, Iran

Malekabad Persian: ملک آباد
- Village
- Location within Iran
- Coordinates: 33°56′00″N 47°57′03″E
- Country: Iran
- Province: Lorestan
- County: Delfan
- District: Mirbag
- Rural District: Mirbag-e Jonubi

Population (2016)
  - Total: 195
- Time zone: UTC+3:30 (IRST)

Malekabad (Persian: ملک آباد) (Note: Also romanized as Malekābād) is a village in Mirbag-e Jonubi Rural District of Mirbag District in Delfan County, Lorestan province, Iran.

== Demographics ==
=== Population ===
At the time of the 2006 National Census, the village's population was 368 in 90 households, when it was in the Central District. The following census in 2011 counted 328 people in 88 households. The 2016 census measured the population of the village as 195 people in 66 households.

In 2022, the rural district was separated from the district in the formation of Mirbag District.
