= Fasarud District =

District in Fars province, Iran

Fasarud District Persian: بخش فسارود
- District
- Location within Iran
- Coordinates: 28°44′17″N 54°15′14″E
- Country: Iran
- Province: Fars
- County: Darab
- Capital: Paskhan
- Time zone: UTC+3:30 (IRST)

Fasarud District (Persian: بخش فسارود) is in Darab County, Fars province, Iran. Its capital is the city of Paskhan, whose population at the time of the 2016 National Census was 1,545 in 393 households.

== History ==
After the 2016 census, Fasarud and Paskhan Rural Districts were separated from the Central District in the formation of Fasarud District. In 2022, the village of Paskhan was elevated to the status of a city.

== Demographics ==
=== Administrative divisions ===
Fasarud District
Administrative Divisions
Fasarud RD
Paskhan RD
Paskhan (city) (Note: Became a city after the 2016 census)
RD = Rural District
