= Sefid Kuh (Kermanshah) =

4L-GAE

Coordinates: 34°11′51″N 47°08′01″E

Sefid-Kooh (Persian: سفیدکوه) is a mountain range of the Zagros Mountains System, located 10 kilometres (6.2 mi) to the south of Kermanshah in Kermanshah Province, western Iran.

Its highest peak is 2,805 metres (9,203 ft) above sea level.

The watershed of the mountain is the separating line between two districts of Kermanshah, Dorood-Faraman and Sarfiroozabad of Mahidasht.
