= Malekabad, Borujerd =

Malekabad ملك اباد
- Village
- Location within Iran
- Coordinates: 33°59′56″N 48°55′48″E
- Country: Iran
- Province: Lorestan
- County: Borujerd
- Bakhsh: Central
- Rural District: Darreh Seydi

Population (2006)
  - Total: 147
- Time zone: UTC+3:30 (IRST)
  - Summer (DST): UTC+4:30 (IRDT)

Malekabad (Persian: ملك اباد, also Romanized as Malekābād, Malakābād, and Malikābād) is a village in Darreh Seydi Rural District, in the Central District of Borujerd County, Lorestan Province, Iran. At the 2006 census, its population was 147, in 33 families.
