= Jannat District =

District in Fars province, Iran

Jannat District Persian: بخش جنت
- District
- Location within Iran
- Coordinates: 28°34′23″N 54°45′02″E
- Country: Iran
- Province: Fars
- County: Darab
- Capital: Jannat Shahr

Population (2016)
  - Total: 29,852
- Time zone: UTC+3:30 (IRST)

Jannat District (Persian: بخش جنت) is in Darab County, Fars province, Iran. Its capital is the city of Jannat Shahr.

== History ==
After the 2006 National Census, Qaleh Biyaban and Qaryah ol Kheyr Rural Districts, and the city of Jannat Shahr, were separated from the Central District in the formation of Jannat District.

== Demographics ==
=== Population ===
At the time of the 2011 census, the district's population was 27,645 people in 7,264 households. The 2016 census measured the population of the district as 29,852 inhabitants in 8,712 households.

=== Administrative divisions ===
Jannat District Population
Administrative Divisions	2011	2016
Qaleh Biyaban RD	7,083	7,472
Qaryah ol Kheyr RD	8,710	8,782
Jannat Shahr (city)	11,852	13,598
Total	27,645	29,852
RD = Rural District
