= Bakhtajerd Rural District =

Rural district in Fars province, Iran

Bakhtajerd Rural District Persian: دهستان بختاجرد
- Rural District
- Location within Iran
- Coordinates: 28°45′02″N 54°25′11″E
- Country: Iran
- Province: Fars
- County: Darab
- District: Central
- Capital: Bakhtajerd

Population (2016)
  - Total: 9,214
- Time zone: UTC+3:30 (IRST)

Bakhtajerd Rural District (Persian: دهستان بختاجرد) (Note: Formerly Shahijan Rural District (دهستان شاهيجان)) is in the Central District of Darab County, Fars province, Iran. Its capital is the village of Bakhtajerd.

== Demographics ==
=== Population ===
At the time of the 2006 National Census, the rural district's population was 8,331 in 1,915 households. There were 9,413 inhabitants in 2,495 households at the following census of 2011. The 2016 census measured the population of the rural district as 9,214 in 2,750 households. The most populous of its 41 villages was Tizab, with 1,609 people.
