= Qaryah ol Kheyr Rural District =

Rural district in Fars province, Iran

Qaryah ol Kheyr Rural District Persian: دهستان قريه الخير
- Rural District
- Location within Iran
- Coordinates: 28°37′16″N 54°38′45″E
- Country: Iran
- Province: Fars
- County: Darab
- District: Jannat
- Capital: Deh Kheyr-e Pain

Population (2016)
  - Total: 8,782
- Time zone: UTC+3:30 (IRST)

Qaryah ol Kheyr Rural District (Persian: دهستان قريه الخير) is in Jannat District of Darab County, Fars province, Iran. Its capital is the village of Deh Kheyr-e Pain.

== Demographics ==
=== Population ===
At the time of the 2006 National Census, the rural district's population (as a part of the Central District) was 6,589 in 1,454 households. There were 8,710 inhabitants in 2,251 households at the following census of 2011, by which time the rural district had been separated from the district in the formation of Jannat District. The 2016 census measured the population of the rural district as 8,782 in 2,512 households. The most populous of its 43 villages was Deh Kheyr-e Pain, with 2,202 people.
