= Balesh Rural District =

Rural district in Fars province, Iran

Balesh Rural District Persian: دهستان بالش
- Rural District
- Location within Iran
- Coordinates: 28°48′19″N 54°43′12″E
- Country: Iran
- Province: Fars
- County: Darab
- District: Central
- Capital: Sang-e Charak

Population (2016)
  - Total: 14,013
- Time zone: UTC+3:30 (IRST)

Balesh Rural District (Persian: دهستان بالش) is in the Central District of Darab County, Fars province, Iran. Its capital is the village of Sang-e Charak.

== Demographics ==
=== Population ===
At the time of the 2006 National Census, the rural district's population was 10,043 in 2,288 households. There were 12,408 inhabitants in 3,317 households at the following census of 2011. The 2016 census measured the population of the rural district as 14,013 in 4,023 households. The most populous of its 65 villages was Tang-e Katuiyeh, with 4,416 people.
