= Abshur Rural District =

Rural district in Fars province, Iran

Abshur Rural District Persian: دهستان آبشور
- Rural District
- Location within Iran
- Coordinates: 28°09′08″N 55°08′42″E
- Country: Iran
- Province: Fars
- County: Darab
- District: Forg
- Capital: Fadami

Population (2016)
  - Total: 6,897
- Time zone: UTC+3:30 (IRST)

Abshur Rural District (Persian: دهستان آبشور) is in Forg District of Darab County, Fars province, Iran. It is administered from the city of Fadami.

== Demographics ==
=== Population ===
At the time of the 2006 National Census, the rural district's population was 10,639 in 2,153 households. There were 6,950 inhabitants in 1,749 households at the following census of 2011. The 2016 census measured the population of the rural district as 6,897 in 1,933 households. The most populous of its 19 villages was Morz, with 3,632 people.
