= Paskhan Rural District =

Rural district in Fars province, Iran

Paskhan Rural District Persian: دهستان پاسخن
- Rural District
- Location within Iran
- Coordinates: 28°47′04″N 54°18′37″E
- Country: Iran
- Province: Fars
- County: Darab
- District: Fasarud
- Capital: Paskhan

Population (2016)
  - Total: 10,499
- Time zone: UTC+3:30 (IRST)

Paskhan Rural District (Persian: دهستان پاسخن) is in Fasarud District of Darab County, Fars province, Iran. It is administered from the city of Paskhan.

== Demographics ==
=== Population ===
At the time of the 2006 National Census, the rural district's population (as a part of the Central District) was 10,977 in 2,529 households. There were 10,921 inhabitants in 2,965 households at the following census of 2011. The 2016 census measured the population of the rural district as 10,499 in 3,157 households. The most populous of its 48 villages was Arab Chegini, with 1,560 people.

After the census, the rural district was separated from the district in the formation of Fasarud District. In addition, the village of Paskhan was elevated to the status of a city.
