= Nasrovan Rural District =

Rural district in Fars province, Iran

Nasrovan Rural District Persian: دهستان نصروان
- Rural District
- Location within Iran
- Coordinates: 28°37′41″N 54°20′36″E
- Country: Iran
- Province: Fars
- County: Darab
- District: Central
- Capital: Nasrovan

Population (2016)
  - Total: 7,333
- Time zone: UTC+3:30 (IRST)

Nasrovan Rural District (Persian: دهستان نصروان) is in the Central District of Darab County, Fars province, Iran. Its capital is the village of Nasrovan.

== Demographics ==
=== Population ===
At the time of the 2006 National Census, the rural district's population was 8,098 in 1,769 households. There were 7,935 inhabitants in 2,068 households at the following census of 2011. The 2016 census measured the population of the rural district as 7,333 in 2,197 households. The most populous of its 43 villages was Herbedan, with 1,301 people.
