= Fasarud Rural District =

Rural district in Fars province, Iran

Fasarud Rural District Persian: دهستان فسارود
- Rural District
- Location within Iran
- Coordinates: 28°42′52″N 54°12′48″E
- Country: Iran
- Province: Fars
- County: Darab
- District: Fasarud
- Capital: Madevan

Population (2016)
  - Total: 7,819
- Time zone: UTC+3:30 (IRST)

Fasarud Rural District (Persian: دهستان فسارود) is in Fasarud District of Darab County, Fars province, Iran. Its capital is the village of Madevan.

== Demographics ==
=== Population ===
At the time of the 2006 National Census, the rural district's population (as a part of the Central District) was 8,531 in 1,988 households. There were 8,479 inhabitants in 2,315 households at the following census of 2011. The 2016 census measured the population of the rural district as 7,819 in 2,421 households. The most populous of its 47 villages was Madevan, with 1,488 people.

After the census, the rural district was separated from the district in the formation of Fasarud District.
