= Qaleh Biyaban Rural District =

Rural district in Fars province, Iran

Qaleh Biyaban Rural District Persian: دهستان قلعه بيابان
- Rural District
- Location within Iran
- Coordinates: 28°33′11″N 54°49′47″E
- Country: Iran
- Province: Fars
- County: Darab
- District: Jannat
- Capital: Qaleh Biyaban

Population (2016)
  - Total: 7,472
- Time zone: UTC+3:30 (IRST)

Qaleh Biyaban Rural District (Persian: دهستان قلعه بيابان) is in Jannat District of Darab County, Fars province, Iran. Its capital is the village of Qaleh Biyaban.

== Demographics ==
=== Population ===
At the time of the 2006 National Census, the rural district's population (as a part of the Central District) was 5,951 in 1,489 households. There were 7,083 inhabitants in 1,931 households at the following census of 2011, by which time the rural district had been separated from the district in the formation of Jannat District. The 2016 census measured the population of the rural district as 7,472 in 2,236 households. The most populous of its 60 villages was Qaleh Biyaban, with 1,657 people.
