= Hashivar Rural District =

Rural district in Fars province, Iran

Hoshivar Rural District Persian: دهستان هشيوار
- Rural District
- Location within Iran
- Coordinates: 28°41′28″N 54°32′07″E
- Country: Iran
- Province: Fars
- County: Darab
- District: Central
- Capital: Shahnan

Population (2016)
  - Total: 15,425
- Time zone: UTC+3:30 (IRST)

Hoshivar Rural District [hošivār] (Persian: دهستان هشيوار) is in the Central District of Darab County, Fars province, Iran. Its capital is the village of Shahnan.

== Demographics ==
=== Population ===
At the time of the 2006 National Census, the rural district's population was 13,827 in 3,081 households. There were 14,241 inhabitants in 3,741 households at the following census of 2011. The 2016 census measured the population of the rural district as 15,425 in 4,180 households. The most populous of its 72 villages was Banuj, with 2,676 people.
