= Forg Rural District =

Rural district in Fars province, Iran

Forg Rural District Persian: دهستان فورگ
- Rural District
- Location within Iran
- Coordinates: 28°20′17″N 55°09′02″E
- Country: Iran
- Province: Fars
- County: Darab
- District: Forg
- Capital: Do Borji

Population (2016)
  - Total: 8,237
- Time zone: UTC+3:30 (IRST)

Forg Rural District (Persian: دهستان فورگ) is in Forg District of Darab County, Fars province, Iran. It is administered from the city of Do Borji.

== Demographics ==
=== Population ===
At the time of the 2006 National Census, the rural district's population was 10,381 in 2,235 households. There were 7,971 inhabitants in 2,183 households at the following census of 2011. The 2016 census measured the population of the rural district as 8,237 in 2,516 households. The most populous of its 39 villages was Qaleh Now, with 1,530 people.
