= Forg District =

District in Fars province, Iran

Forg District Persian: بخش فورگ
- District
- Location within Iran
- Coordinates: 28°14′32″N 55°08′53″E
- Country: Iran
- Province: Fars
- County: Darab
- Capital: Do Borji

Population (2016)
  - Total: 22,138
- Time zone: UTC+3:30 (IRST)

Forg District (Persian: بخش فورگ) is in Darab County, Fars province, Iran. Its capital is the city of Do Borji.

== History ==
After the 2006 National Census, the villages of Do Borji and Fadami were elevated to city status.

== Demographics ==
=== Population ===
At the time of the 2006 census, the district's population was 21,020 in 4,388 households. The following census in 2011 counted 21,600 people in 5,616 households. The 2016 census measured the population of the district as 22,138 inhabitants in 6,444 households.

=== Administrative divisions ===
Forg District Population
Administrative Divisions	2006	2011	2016
Abshur RD	10,639	6,950	6,897
Forg RD	10,381	7,971	8,237
Do Borji (city)		2,651	2,907
Fadami (city)		4,028	4,097
Total	21,020	21,600	22,138
RD = Rural District
