= Central District (Darab County) =

District in Fars province, Iran

Central District (Darab County) Persian: بخش مرکزی شهرستان داراب
- District
- Location within Iran
- Coordinates: 28°47′N 54°39′E
- Country: Iran
- Province: Fars
- County: Darab
- Capital: Darab

Population (2016)
  - Total: 134,535
- Time zone: UTC+3:30 (IRST)

The Central District of Darab County (Persian: بخش مرکزی شهرستان داراب) is in Fars province, Iran. Its capital is the city of Darab.

== History ==
After the 2006 National Census, Qaleh Biyaban and Qaryah ol Kheyr Rural Districts, and the city of Jannat Shahr, were separated from the district in the formation of Jannat District.

After the 2016 census, Fasarud and Paskhan Rural Districts were also separated from the district in the formation of Fasarud District.

== Demographics ==
=== Population ===
At the time of the 2006 census, the district's population was 137,677 in 32,165 households. The following census in 2011 counted 125,069 people in 33,831 households. The 2016 census measured the population of the district as 134,535 inhabitants in 40,036 households.

=== Administrative divisions ===
Central District (Darab County) Population
Administrative Divisions	2006	2011	2016
Bakhtajerd RD (Note: Formerly Shahijan Rural District)	8,331	9,413	9,214
Balesh RD	10,043	12,408	14,013
Fasarud RD (Note: Transferred to of Fasarud District after the 2016 census)	8,531	8,479	7,819
Hashivar RD	13,827	14,241	15,425
Nasrovan RD	8,098	7,935	7,333
Paskhan RD	10,977	10,921	10,499
Qaleh Biyaban RD (Note: Transferred to Jannat District)	5,951		
Qaryah ol Kheyr RD	6,589		
Darab (city)	54,513	61,672	70,232
Jannat Shahr (city)	10,817		
Total	137,677	125,069	134,535
RD = Rural District
