= Darab County =

County in Fars province, Iran

Darab County Persian: شهرستان داراب
- County
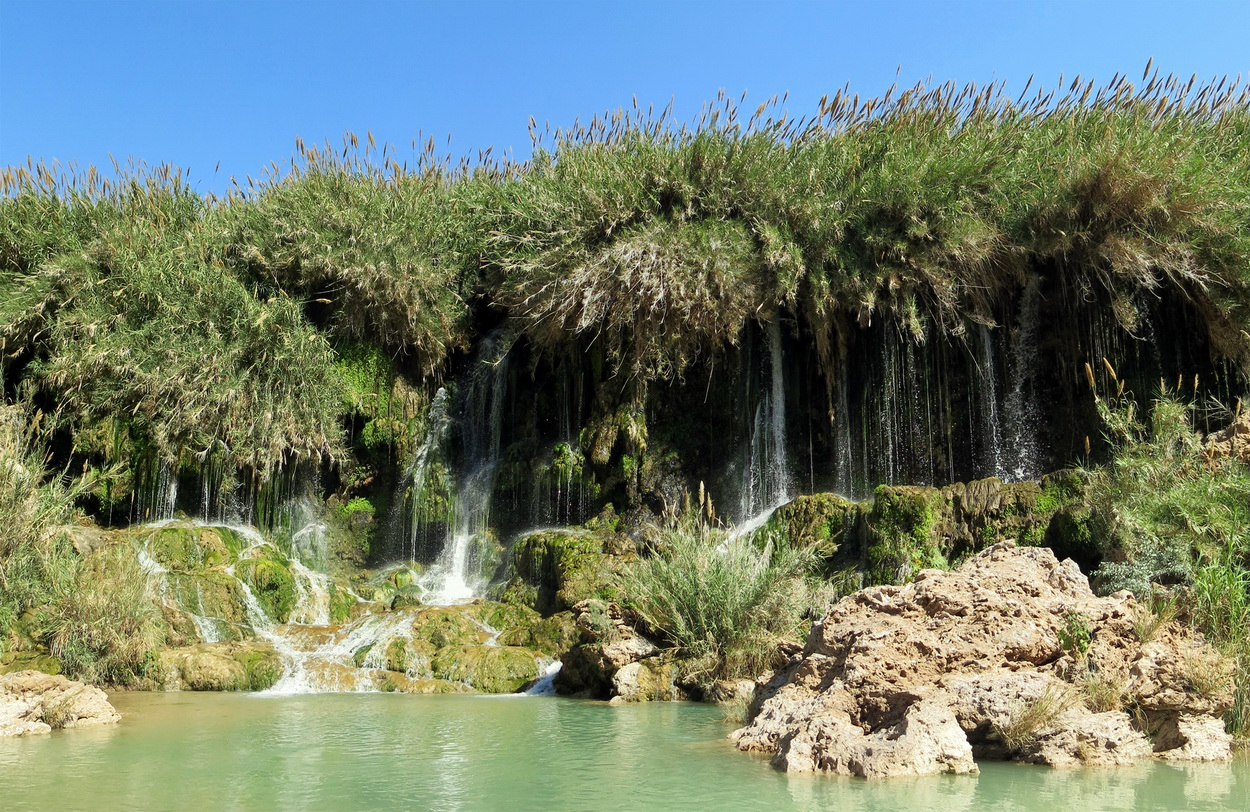
- Fadami Waterfalls

- Location of Darab County in Fars province (right, pink)

- Location of Fars province in Iran
- Coordinates: 28°32′N 54°46′E
- Country: Iran
- Province: Fars
- Capital: Darab
- Districts: Central, Fasarud, Forg, Jannat, Rostaq

Population (2016)
  - Total: 201,489
- Time zone: UTC+3:30 (IRST)

Darab County (Persian: شهرستان داراب) is in Fars province, Iran. Its capital is the city of Darab.

== History ==
Legend ascribes the foundation of the city to Darius, hence its name Darab-gerd ("Darius-fort").

In the neighborhood there are various remains of antiquity, the most important of which mi. S., is known as the Kalah i Dal-a, or citadel of Darius, and consists of a series of earthworks arranged in a circle round an isolated rock. Nothing, however, remains to fix the date or explain the history of the fortification. Another monument in the vicinity is a gigantic bas-relief, carved on the vertical face of a rock, representing the victory of the Sassanian Shapur I (Sapor) of Persia over the Roman emperor Valerian, A.D. 260.

=== Administrative history ===
After the 2006 National Census, Qaleh Biyaban and Qaryah ol Kheyr Rural Districts, and the city of Jannat Shahr, were separated from the Central District in the formation of Jannat District. In addition, the villages of Do Borji and Fadami were elevated to city status.

After the 2016 census, Fasarud and Paskhan Rural Districts were separated from the Central District in the formation of Fasarud District. The villages of Rostaq and Paskhan rose to city status in 2018 and 2022, respectively.

== Demographics ==
=== Population ===
At the time of the 2006 census, the county's population was 172,938 in 39,955 households. The following census in 2011 counted 189,345 people in 50,595 households. The 2016 census measured the population of the county as 201,489 in 59,525 households.

=== Administrative divisions ===
Darab County's population history and administrative structure over three consecutive censuses are shown in the following table.

Darab County Population
Administrative Divisions	2006	2011	2016
Central District	137,677	125,069	134,535
Bakhtajerd RD (Note: Formerly Shahijan Rural District)	8,331	9,413	9,214
Balesh RD	10,043	12,408	14,013
Fasarud RD	8,531	8,479	7,819
Hashivar RD	13,827	14,241	15,425
Nasrovan RD	8,098	7,935	7,333
Paskhan RD	10,977	10,921	10,499
Qaleh Biyaban RD	5,951		
Qaryah ol Kheyr RD	6,589		
Darab (city)	54,513	61,672	70,232
Jannat Shahr (city)	10,817		
Fasarud District (Note: Established after the 2016 census)			
Fasarud RD			
Paskhan RD			
Paskhan (city) (Note: Became a city after the 2016 census)			
Forg District	21,020	21,600	22,138
Abshur RD	10,639	6,950	6,897
Forg RD	10,381	7,971	8,237
Do Borji (city)		2,651	2,907
Fadami (city)		4,028	4,097
Jannat District		27,645	29,852
Qaleh Biyaban RD		7,083	7,472
Qaryah ol Kheyr RD		8,710	8,782
Jannat Shahr (city)		11,852	13,598
Rostaq District	14,241	14,340	14,391
Kuhestan RD	5,070	4,985	5,561
Rostaq RD	9,171	9,355	8,830
Rostaq (city) (Note: Became a city after the 2016 census)			
Total	172,938	189,345	201,489
RD = Rural District

== Geography ==
Darab County has five hundred villages, and possesses a very hot climate, snow being rarely seen there in winter. Darab County has an area of about 7,500 square kilometers and an altitude of 1180 meters.

== Economy ==
Darab produces fruits, cereals, cotton, and tobacco, while the lower areas are used for winter crops by the Baharlu tribe. There are also nearby salt mines which have long been utilized. The town Darab, the capital of the district, is situated in a very fertile plain, 140 mi. S.E. of Shiraz. It has extensive orchards of orange and lemon trees and immense plantations of date-palms.

== See also ==
Media related to Darab County at Wikimedia Commons
