= Shul (disambiguation) =

Shul, meaning school in Yiddish, is another term for synagogue.

Shul (Persian: شول) may also refer to:

== Places in Iran ==
=== Bushehr Province ===
- Shul, Dashtestan, a village
- Shul, Ganaveh, a village

=== Fars Province ===
- Shul, Mohr, a village
- Shul, Sepidan, a village
- Kalgah, Fars, Sepidan County, a village also known as Shūl
- Shul, Zarqan, a village

== Other uses ==
- Brian Shul (1948-2023), United States Air Force pilot and photographer

== See also ==
Other places in Fars Province:

- Shul-e Bozi, Marvdasht County
- Shul-e Bozorg, Marvdasht County
- Shul-e Sarui, Marvdasht County
- Shul-e Dalkhan, Sepidan County
- Shool, a 1999 Indian Hindi-language action crime film
