= Sadabad, Iran (disambiguation) =

Sadabad, Iran is a city in Bushehr Province, Iran.

Sadabad (Persian: سعداباد) in Iran may also refer to:

== Bushehr Province ==
- Sadabad, Iran, a city
- Sadabad District, in Bushehr Province

== East Azerbaijan Province ==
- Sadabad, East Azerbaijan, a village in Bostanabad County

== Fars Province ==
- Sadabad-e Davan, a village in Kazerun County
- Sadabad, Lamerd, a village in Lamerd County

== Golestan Province ==
- Sadabad, Golestan
- Sadabad-e Fenderesk, Golestan Province

== Ilam Province ==
- Sadabad, Ilam

== Isfahan Province ==
- Sadabad, Nain, a village in Nain County

== Kerman Province ==
- Sadabad, Anbarabad, a village in Anbarabad County
- Sadabad, Bam, a village in Bam County
- Sadabad, Kerman, a village in Kerman County
- Sadabad, Rigan, a village in Rigan County

== Kurdistan Province ==
- Sadabad, Bijar, a village in Bijar County
- Sadabad, Marivan, a village in Marivan County

== Markazi Province ==
- Sadabad, Markazi

== Qom Province ==
- Sadabad, Qom

== Razavi Khorasan Province ==
- Sadabad, Dargaz, Razavi Khorasan Province
- Sadabad, Fariman, Razavi Khorasan Province
- Sadabad, Nishapur, Razavi Khorasan Province
- Sadabad, Rashtkhvar, Razavi Khorasan Province
- Sadabad, Zaveh, Razavi Khorasan Province
- Sadabad-e Arab, Razavi Khorasan Province

== Semnan Province ==
- Sadabad, Garmsar, in Garmsar County
- Sadabad, Shahrud, in Shahrud County

== Tehran Province ==
- Sadabad-e Amlak, in Tehran Province
- Saidabad, Pishva, in Tehran Province
- Sa'dabad Palace, Tehran, Iran

== Yazd Province ==
- Sadabad, Yazd, a village in Taft County

== Zanjan Province ==
- Sadabad, Zanjan, a village in Khodabandeh County
