= Garmeh (disambiguation) =

Garmeh is a city in North Khorasan Province, Iran.

Garmeh (Persian: گرمه) may also refer to:

- Garmeh, Fars, a village in Marvdasht County, Fars province
- Garmeh Rural District, an administrative division of Marvdasht County, Fars province
- Garmeh, Ilam, a village in Shirvan and Chardaval County, Ilam province
- Garmeh-ye Dul, a village in Saqqez County, Kurdistan province
- Garmeh, Isfahan, a village in Isfahan province
- Garmeh Khush, a village in Esfarayen County, North Khorasan province
- Garmeh, Fariman, a village in Fariman County, Razavi Khorasan province
- Garmeh, Mashhad, a village in Mashhad County, Razavi Khorasan province
- Garmeh County, in North Khorasan province
- Garmeh-ye Jonubi Rural District, in East Azerbaijan province
- Garmeh-ye Shomali Rural District, in East Azerbaijan province
