= Sahlabad =

Sahlabad or Sehlabad (Persian: سهل اباد) may refer to:

- Sahlabad, Chaharmahal and Bakhtiari
- Sahlabad, East Azerbaijan
- Sahlabad, Arsanjan, Fars Province
- Sahlabad, Estahban, Fars Province
- Sahlabad, Firuzabad, Fars Province
- Sahlabad, Abarj, Marvdasht County, Fars Province
- Sahlabad, Ramjerd-e Do, Marvdasht County, Fars Province
- Sahlabad, Shiraz, Fars Province
- Sahlabad, Markazi
- Sahlabad, Nishapur, Razavi Khorasan Province
- Sahlabad, Quchan, Razavi Khorasan Province
- Sahlabad, South Khorasan
- Sahlabad, Yazd
