= Zirrah =

Zirrah or Zir Rah or Zirah (Persian: زيرراه) may refer to:

- Zirrah, Bushehr
- Zir Rah, Tangestan
- Zir Rah, Ramhormoz, Khuzestan Province
- Zirrah Rural District, in Bushehr Province

== See also ==
- Zirrah Amirqoli
