= Barmak =

Barmak may refer to:

== People ==
- Barmakids, a political clan of Iranian origin, attaining high offices in the medieval Abbasid Caliphate
  - Khalid ibn Barmak, vizier
  - Yahya ibn Khalid, vizier
  - Muhammad ibn Khalid ibn Barmak, hajib
  - Ja'far ibn Yahya, vizier
  - Al-Fadl ibn Yahya, vizier
- Others:
  - Barmak Akram (born 1966), Afghan filmmaker
  - Siddiq Barmak (born 1962), Afghan film director
  - Wais Barmak (born 1972), Afghan politician

== Places ==
- Barmak, Bushehr, a village in Bushehr Province, Iran
- Barmak-e Bozorg, a village in Bushehr Province, Iran
- Barmak-e Kuchek, a village in Bushehr Province, Iran
- Bashkirsky Barmak, a rural locality in Bashkortostan, Russia
