= Bakian =

Village in Fars province, Iran

Bakian Persian: بكيان
- Village
- Location within Iran
- Coordinates: 30°20′38″N 52°15′52″E
- Country: Iran
- Province: Fars
- County: Marvdasht
- District: Kamfiruz-e Shomali
- Rural District: Garmeh

Population (2016)
  - Total: 1,590
- Time zone: UTC+3:30 (IRST)

Bakian (Persian: بكيان) (Note: Also romanized as Bakiān, Bakīān, and Bakyān) is a village in Garmeh Rural District of Kamfiruz-e Shomali District, (Note: Formerly Kor District) Marvdasht County, Fars province, Iran.

== Demographics ==
=== Population ===
At the time of the 2006 National Census, the village's population was 1,526 in 331 households, when it was in Kamfiruz-e Shomali Rural District of Kamfiruz District. The following census in 2011 counted 1,569 people in 447 households, by which time the rural district had been separated from the district in the establishment of Kor District. (Note: Renamed Kamfiruz-e Shomali District) Bakian was transferred to Garmeh Rural District created in the new district. The 2016 census measured the population of the village as 1,590 people in 512 households. It was the most populous village in its rural district.
