= Bani Yekkeh =

Bani Yekkeh بني يكه
- Village
- Location within Iran
- Coordinates: 30°05′30″N 52°42′03″E
- Country: Iran
- Province: Fars
- County: Marvdasht
- Bakhsh: Dorudzan
- Rural District: Abarj

Population (2006)
  - Total: 858
- Time zone: UTC+3:30 (IRST)
  - Summer (DST): UTC+4:30 (IRDT)

Bani Yekkeh (Persian: بني يكه, also Romanized as Banī Yekkeh and Banī Yakeh; also known as Banī Tekyeh, Bani Yaki, Beyn Yekī, and Bīn Yakī) is a village in Abarj Rural District, Dorudzan District, Marvdasht County, Fars province, Iran. At the 2006 census, its population was 858, in 193 families.
