= Now Sanjan =

Now Sanjan نوسنجان
- Village
- Location within Iran
- Coordinates: 30°00′04″N 52°33′59″E
- Country: Iran
- Province: Fars
- County: Marvdasht
- Bakhsh: Dorudzan
- Rural District: Ramjerd-e Do

Population (2006)
  - Total: 404
- Time zone: UTC+3:30 (IRST)
  - Summer (DST): UTC+4:30 (IRDT)

Now Sanjan (Persian: نوسنجان, also Romanized as Now Sanjān, Now Senjān, and Nūsanjān) is a village in Ramjerd-e Do Rural District, Dorudzan District, Marvdasht County, Fars province, Iran. At the 2006 census, its population was 404, in 110 families.
