= Zarareh =

Zarareh زراره
- Village
- Location within Iran
- Coordinates: 30°02′28″N 52°34′53″E
- Country: Iran
- Province: Fars
- County: Marvdasht
- Bakhsh: Dorudzan
- Rural District: Ramjerd-e Do

Population (2006)
  - Total: 543
- Time zone: UTC+3:30 (IRST)
  - Summer (DST): UTC+4:30 (IRDT)

Zarareh (Persian: زراره, also Romanized as Zarāreh, Zerāreh, and Zorāreh) is a village in Ramjerd-e Do Rural District, Dorudzan District, Marvdasht County, Fars province, Iran. At the 2006 census, its population was 543, in 130 families.
