= Qasr-e Khalil =

Qasr-e Khalil قصرخليل
- Village
- Location within Iran
- Coordinates: 30°14′51″N 52°27′12″E
- Country: Iran
- Province: Fars
- County: Marvdasht
- Bakhsh: Dorudzan
- Rural District: Dorudzan

Population (2006)
  - Total: 1,092
- Time zone: UTC+3:30 (IRST)
  - Summer (DST): UTC+4:30 (IRDT)

Qasr-e Khalil (Persian: قصرخليل, also Romanized as Qaşr-e Khalīl) is a village in Dorudzan Rural District, Dorudzan District, Marvdasht County, Fars province, Iran. At the 2006 census, its population was 1,092, in 238 families.
