= Cham Kangari =

Cham Kangari چمكنگري
- Village
- Location within Iran
- Coordinates: 30°31′46″N 52°04′04″E
- Country: Iran
- Province: Fars
- County: Marvdasht
- Bakhsh: Kamfiruz
- Rural District: Kamfiruz-e Shomali

Population (2006)
  - Total: 294
- Time zone: UTC+3:30 (IRST)
  - Summer (DST): UTC+4:30 (IRDT)

Cham Kangari (Persian: چمكنگري, also Romanized as Cham Kangarī) is a village in Kamfiruz-e Shomali Rural District, Kamfiruz District, Marvdasht County, Fars province, Iran. At the 2006 census, its population was 294, in 71 families.
