= Siah Mansur =

Siah Mansur or Siyah Mansur or Seyah Mansur (Persian: سياه منصور) may refer to:

- Siah Mansur-e Olya, Bushehr Province
- Siah Mansur-e Sofla, Bushehr Province
- Seyah Mansur, East Azerbaijan
- Siah Mansur, Khuzestan
- Siyah Mansur Rural District, in Kurdistan Province
