= Barezabad =

Barezabad بارزاباد
- Village
- Location within Iran
- Coordinates: 30°04′50″N 52°33′37″E
- Country: Iran
- Province: Fars
- County: Marvdasht
- Bakhsh: Dorudzan
- Rural District: Ramjerd-e Do

Population (2006)
  - Total: 667
- Time zone: UTC+3:30 (IRST)
  - Summer (DST): UTC+4:30 (IRDT)

Barezabad (Persian: بارزاباد, also Romanized as Bārezābād; also known as Bārezābād Rāmjerd) is a village in Ramjerd-e Do Rural District, Dorudzan District, Marvdasht County, Fars province, Iran. At the 2006 census, its population was 667, in 147 families.
