= Golmakan =

Golmakan or Gol Makan (Persian: گلمكان), also rendered as Gulmakan, may refer to:

- Gol Makan-e Baseri, Fars Province
- Gol Makan-e Qeshlaq, Fars Province
- Golmakan, Pasargad, Fars Province
- Golmakan, Razavi Khorasan
- Gol Makan, Zanjan
- Golmakan Rural District, in Razavi Khorasan Province
