= Cham-e Zir =

Cham-e Zir چم زير
- Village
- Location within Iran
- Coordinates: 30°27′43″N 52°06′23″E
- Country: Iran
- Province: Fars
- County: Marvdasht
- Bakhsh: Kamfiruz
- Rural District: Kamfiruz-e Shomali

Population (2006)
  - Total: 389
- Time zone: UTC+3:30 (IRST)
  - Summer (DST): UTC+4:30 (IRDT)

Cham-e Zir (Persian: چم زير, also Romanized as Cham-e Zīr; also known as Cham-e Rīz and Chamrīz) is a village in Kamfiruz-e Shomali Rural District, Kamfiruz District, Marvdasht County, Fars province, Iran. At the 2006 census, its population was 389, in 79 families.
