= Lirmanjan =

Lirmanjan ليرمنجان
- Village
- Location within Iran
- Coordinates: 30°15′01″N 52°16′40″E
- Country: Iran
- Province: Fars
- County: Marvdasht
- Bakhsh: Kamfiruz
- Rural District: Khorram Makan

Population (2006)
  - Total: 1,037
- Time zone: UTC+3:30 (IRST)
  - Summer (DST): UTC+4:30 (IRDT)

Lirmanjan (Persian: ليرمنجان, also Romanized as Līrmanjān; also known as Līrmanjān-e Kām Fīrūz) is a village in Khorram Makan Rural District, Kamfiruz District, Marvdasht County, Fars province, Iran. At the 2006 census, its population was 1,037, in 192 families.
