= Deh Damcheh =

Deh Damcheh ده دامچه
- Village
- Location within Iran
- Coordinates: 30°23′55″N 52°10′07″E
- Country: Iran
- Province: Fars
- County: Marvdasht
- Bakhsh: Kamfiruz
- Rural District: Kamfiruz-e Shomali

Population (2006)
  - Total: 177
- Time zone: UTC+3:30 (IRST)
  - Summer (DST): UTC+4:30 (IRDT)

Deh Damcheh (Persian: ده دامچه, also Romanized as Deh Dāmcheh and Dehdāmcheh; also known as Dāmcheh and Deh Dombeh) is a village in Kamfiruz-e Shomali Rural District, Kamfiruz District, Marvdasht County, Fars province, Iran. At the 2006 census, its population was 177, in 40 families.
