= Mangun =

Mangun منگون
- Village
- Location within Iran
- Coordinates: 30°20′53″N 52°10′00″E
- Country: Iran
- Province: Fars
- County: Marvdasht
- Bakhsh: Kamfiruz
- Rural District: Kamfiruz-e Jonubi

Population (2006)
  - Total: 720
- Time zone: UTC+3:30 (IRST)
  - Summer (DST): UTC+4:30 (IRDT)

Mangun (Persian: منگون, also Romanized as Mangūn; also known as Mangān and Menjān) is a village in Kamfiruz-e Jonubi Rural District, Kamfiruz District, Marvdasht County, Fars province, Iran. At the 2006 census, its population was 720, in 151 families.
