= Cham-e Chenar =

Cham-e Chenar چم چنار
- Village
- Location within Iran
- Coordinates: 30°29′14″N 52°05′24″E
- Country: Iran
- Province: Fars
- County: Marvdasht
- Bakhsh: Kamfiruz
- Rural District: Kamfiruz-e Shomali

Population (2006)
  - Total: 184
- Time zone: UTC+3:30 (IRST)
  - Summer (DST): UTC+4:30 (IRDT)

Cham-e Chenar (Persian: چم چنار, also Romanized as Cham-e Chenār; also known as Cham Chenār) is a village in Kamfiruz-e Shomali Rural District, Kamfiruz District, Marvdasht County, Fars province, Iran. At the 2006 census, its population was 184, in 47 families.
