= Cham-e Sohrab Khani =

Cham-e Sohrab Khani چم سهراب خاني
- Village
- Location within Iran
- Coordinates: 30°28′03″N 52°05′54″E
- Country: Iran
- Province: Fars
- County: Marvdasht
- Bakhsh: Kamfiruz
- Rural District: Kamfiruz-e Shomali

Population (2006)
  - Total: 271
- Time zone: UTC+3:30 (IRST)
  - Summer (DST): UTC+4:30 (IRDT)

Cham-e Sohrab Khani (Persian: چم سهراب خاني, also Romanized as Cham-e Sohrāb Khānī; also known as Cham Sohrāb and Sohrābkhānī) is a village in Kamfiruz-e Shomali Rural District, Kamfiruz District, Marvdasht County, Fars province, Iran. At the 2006 census, its population was 271, in 61 families.
