= Karbalai Mohammad Hoseyn =

Karbalai Mohammad Hoseyn كربلايي محمدحسين
- Village
- Location within Iran
- Coordinates: 30°14′51″N 52°12′09″E
- Country: Iran
- Province: Fars
- County: Marvdasht
- Bakhsh: Kamfiruz
- Rural District: Khorram Makan

Population (2006)
  - Total: 497
- Time zone: UTC+3:30 (IRST)
  - Summer (DST): UTC+4:30 (IRDT)

Karbalai Mohammad Hoseyn (Persian: كربلايي محمدحسين, also Romanized as Karbalā’ī Moḩammad Ḩoseyn; also known as Karbalā’ī Moḩammad Ḩoseynī) is a village in Khorram Makan Rural District, Kamfiruz District, Marvdasht County, Fars province, Iran. At the 2006 census, its population was 497, in 88 families.
