= Razmanjan =

Razmanjan رزمنجان
- Village
- Location within Iran
- Coordinates: 30°06′17″N 52°36′56″E
- Country: Iran
- Province: Fars
- County: Marvdasht
- Bakhsh: Dorudzan
- Rural District: Ramjerd-e Do

Population (2006)
  - Total: 514
- Time zone: UTC+3:30 (IRST)
  - Summer (DST): UTC+4:30 (IRDT)

Razmanjan (Persian: رزمنجان, also Razmangund as Razmanjān; also known as Razmengān, Razmenjan, and Razmanjon) is a village in Ramjerd-e Do Rural District, Dorudzan District, Marvdasht County, Fars province, Iran. At the 2006 census, its population was 514, in 129 families.
