= Qaleh Chogha =

Qaleh Chogha قلعه چغا
- Village
- Location within Iran
- Coordinates: 30°16′05″N 52°17′13″E
- Country: Iran
- Province: Fars
- County: Marvdasht
- Bakhsh: Kamfiruz
- Rural District: Khorram Makan

Population (2006)
  - Total: 655
- Time zone: UTC+3:30 (IRST)
  - Summer (DST): UTC+4:30 (IRDT)

Qaleh Chogha (Persian: قلعه چغا, also Romanized as Qal‘eh Choghā) is a village in Khorram Makan Rural District, Kamfiruz District, Marvdasht County, Fars province, Iran. At the 2006 census, its population was 655, in 151 families.
