= Jidarzar =

Jidarzar جيدرزار
- Village
- Location within Iran
- Coordinates: 30°19′24″N 52°08′12″E
- Country: Iran
- Province: Fars
- County: Marvdasht
- Bakhsh: Kamfiruz
- Rural District: Kamfiruz-e Jonubi

Population (2006)
  - Total: 86
- Time zone: UTC+3:30 (IRST)
  - Summer (DST): UTC+4:30 (IRDT)

Jidarzar (Persian: جيدرزار, also Romanized as Jīdarzār; also known as Jīdarzāl) is a village in Kamfiruz-e Jonubi Rural District, Kamfiruz District, Marvdasht County, Fars province, Iran. At the 2006 census, its population was 86, in 19 families.
