= Allah Morad Khani =

Allah Morad Khani اله مرادخاني
- Village
- Location within Iran
- Coordinates: 30°23′16″N 52°10′39″E
- Country: Iran
- Province: Fars
- County: Marvdasht
- Bakhsh: Kamfiruz
- Rural District: Kamfiruz-e Shomali

Population (2006)
  - Total: 562
- Time zone: UTC+3:30 (IRST)
  - Summer (DST): UTC+4:30 (IRDT)

Allah Morad Khani (Persian: اله مرادخاني, also Romanized as Allāh Morād Khānī) is a village in Kamfiruz-e Shomali Rural District, Kamfiruz District, Marvdasht County, Fars province, Iran. At the 2006 census, its population was 562, in 104 families.
