= Cheshmeh-ye Takht =

Cheshmeh-ye Takht چشمه تخت
- Village
- Location within Iran
- Coordinates: 30°12′15″N 52°35′07″E
- Country: Iran
- Province: Fars
- County: Marvdasht
- Bakhsh: Dorudzan
- Rural District: Abarj

Population (2006)
  - Total: 13
- Time zone: UTC+3:30 (IRST)
  - Summer (DST): UTC+4:30 (IRDT)

Cheshmeh-ye Takht (Persian: چشمه تخت) is a village in Abarj Rural District, Dorudzan District, Marvdasht County, Fars province, Iran. At the 2006 census, its population was 13, in 4 families.
