= Sarbast =

Sarbast or Sar Bast (Persian: سربست) may refer to:

- Sarbast, Dashtestan, Bushehr Province
- Sarbast, Ganaveh, Bushehr Province
- Sarbast, Tangestan, Bushehr Province
- Sar Bast, Marvdasht, Fars Province
- Sar Bast, Sepidan, Fars Province

Sarbast Gli was born in Iran on the 28 February 1993 is ethnically Iraqi Kurdish. He lived in Sweden and London his father Allan Gli and stepmother Sundus Gli and has 5 sisters Zaman Gli, Kalin Gli, Ashien Gli, Nermin Gli, Rosen Gli
