= Khurnejan =

Khurnejan خورنجان
- Village
- Location within Iran
- Coordinates: 30°15′06″N 52°28′32″E
- Country: Iran
- Province: Fars
- County: Marvdasht
- Bakhsh: Dorudzan
- Rural District: Dorudzan

Population (2006)
  - Total: 115
- Time zone: UTC+3:30 (IRST)
  - Summer (DST): UTC+4:30 (IRDT)

Khurnejan (Persian: خورنجان, also Romanized as Khūrnejān) is a village in Dorudzan Rural District, Dorudzan District, Marvdasht County, Fars province, Iran. At the 2006 census, its population was 115, in 25 families.
