= Ashjerd =

Ashjerd اشجرد
- Village
- Location within Iran
- Coordinates: 30°12′10″N 52°42′12″E
- Country: Iran
- Province: Fars
- County: Marvdasht
- Bakhsh: Dorudzan
- Rural District: Abarj

Population (2006)
  - Total: 1,270
- Time zone: UTC+3:30 (IRST)
  - Summer (DST): UTC+4:30 (IRDT)

Ashjerd (Persian: اشجرد; also known as Ashgerd and Ashkjerd) is a village in Abarj Rural District, Dorudzan District, Marvdasht County, Fars province, Iran. At the 2006 census, its population was 1,270, in 260 families.
