= Avanjan =

Avanjan اونجان
- Village
- Location within Iran
- Coordinates: 30°05′46″N 52°38′06″E
- Country: Iran
- Province: Fars
- County: Marvdasht
- Bakhsh: Dorudzan
- Rural District: Ramjerd-e Do

Population (2006)
  - Total: 842
- Time zone: UTC+3:30 (IRST)
  - Summer (DST): UTC+4:30 (IRDT)

Avanjan (Persian: اونجان, also Romanized as Avanjān and Āvenjān; also known as Avangūn and Āvangūn) is a village in Ramjerd-e Do Rural District, Dorudzan District, Marvdasht County, Fars province, Iran. At the 2006 census, its population was 842, in 192 families.
