= Tall-e Sorkh =

Tall-e Sorkh تل سرخ
- Village
- Location within Iran
- Coordinates: 30°02′55″N 52°35′36″E
- Country: Iran
- Province: Fars
- County: Marvdasht
- Bakhsh: Dorudzan
- Rural District: Ramjerd-e Do

Population (2006)
  - Total: 441
- Time zone: UTC+3:30 (IRST)
  - Summer (DST): UTC+4:30 (IRDT)

Tall-e Sorkh (Persian: تل سرخ; also known as Tall-e Sorkh-e Jadīd) is a village in Ramjerd-e Do Rural District, Dorudzan District, Marvdasht County, Fars province, Iran. At the 2006 census its population was 441, in 102 families.
