= Kondazi =

Kondazi كندازي
- Village
- Location within Iran
- Coordinates: 30°15′13″N 52°41′55″E
- Country: Iran
- Province: Fars
- County: Marvdasht
- Bakhsh: Dorudzan
- Rural District: Abarj

Population (2006)
  - Total: 557
- Time zone: UTC+3:30 (IRST)
  - Summer (DST): UTC+4:30 (IRDT)

Kondazi (Persian: كندازي, also Romanized as Kondāzī; also known as Kondārī and Kundāzi) is a village in Abarj Rural District, Dorudzan District, Marvdasht County, Fars province, Iran. At the 2006 census, its population was 557, in 152 families.
