= Ramjerdi =

Ramjerdi رامجردي
- Village
- Location within Iran
- Coordinates: 30°08′02″N 52°36′37″E
- Country: Iran
- Province: Fars
- County: Marvdasht
- Bakhsh: Dorudzan
- Rural District: Ramjerd-e Do

Population (2006)
  - Total: 357
- Time zone: UTC+3:30 (IRST)
  - Summer (DST): UTC+4:30 (IRDT)

Ramjerdi (Persian: رامجردي, also Romanized as Rāmjerdī; also known as Rāmgerdī, Rāmjerd, Rāmjerdāmjerdī, and Ramjird) is a village in Ramjerd-e Do Rural District, Dorudzan District, Marvdasht County, Fars province, Iran. At the 2006 census, its population was 357, in 80 families.
