= Darreh Mal =

Darreh Mal درهمال
- Village
- Location within Iran
- Coordinates: 30°10′49″N 52°32′41″E
- Country: Iran
- Province: Fars
- County: Marvdasht
- Bakhsh: Dorudzan
- Rural District: Abarj

Population (2006)
  - Total: 70
- Time zone: UTC+3:30 (IRST)
  - Summer (DST): UTC+4:30 (IRDT)

Darreh Mal (Persian: درهمال, also Romanized as Darreh Māl; also known as Darreh Māl-e Abraj, Darreh Mālī, Darreh Mālī, and Darreh Mān) is a village in Abarj Rural District, Dorudzan District, Marvdasht County, Fars province, Iran. At the 2006 census, its population was 70, in 10 families.
