= Madeh Banan =

Madeh Banan ماده بانان
- Village
- Location within Iran
- Coordinates: 30°02′54″N 52°34′25″E
- Country: Iran
- Province: Fars
- County: Marvdasht
- Bakhsh: Dorudzan
- Rural District: Ramjerd-e Do

Population (2006)
  - Total: 168
- Time zone: UTC+3:30 (IRST)
  - Summer (DST): UTC+4:30 (IRDT)

Madeh Banan (Persian: ماده بانان, also Romanized as Mādeh Bānān) is a village in Ramjerd-e Do Rural District, Dorudzan District, Marvdasht County, Fars province, Iran. At the 2006 census, its population was 168, in 38 families.
