= Pir Sabz Ali =

Pir Sabz Ali پيرسبزعلي
- Village
- Location within Iran
- Coordinates: 30°30′08″N 52°05′34″E
- Country: Iran
- Province: Fars
- County: Marvdasht
- Bakhsh: Kamfiruz
- Rural District: Kamfiruz-e Shomali

Population (2006)
  - Total: 268
- Time zone: UTC+3:30 (IRST)
  - Summer (DST): UTC+4:30 (IRDT)

Pir Sabz Ali (Persian: پيرسبزعلي, also Romanized as Pīr Sabz 'Alī) is a village in Kamfiruz-e Shomali Rural District, Kamfiruz District, Marvdasht County, Fars province, Iran. At the 2006 census, its population was 268, in 64 families.
