= Shahrak-e Kondaz =

Shahrak-e Kondaz شهرک کنداز
- Village
- Country: Iran
- Province: Fars
- County: Marvdasht
- Bakhsh: Dorudzan
- Rural District: Abarj

Population (2006)
  - Total: 104
- Time zone: UTC+3:30 (IRST)
  - Summer (DST): UTC+4:30 (IRDT)

Shahrak-e Kondaz (Persian: شهرک کنداز, also Romanized as Shahrak-e Kondāz) is a village in Abarj Rural District, Dorudzan District, Marvdasht County, Fars province, Iran. At the 2006 census, its population was 104, in 24 families.
