= Tireh Bagh =

Tireh Bagh تيره باغ
- Village
- Location within Iran
- Coordinates: 30°14′02″N 52°40′33″E
- Country: Iran
- Province: Fars
- County: Marvdasht
- Bakhsh: Dorudzan
- Rural District: Abarj

Population (2006)
  - Total: 118
- Time zone: UTC+3:30 (IRST)
  - Summer (DST): UTC+4:30 (IRDT)

Tireh Bagh (Persian: تيره باغ, also Romanized as Tīreh Bāgh; also known as Tīr-e Bāgh) is a village in Abarj Rural District, Dorudzan District, Marvdasht County, Fars province, Iran. At the 2006 census, its population was 118, made up of 21 families.
