= Aliabad-e Olya, Fars =

Aliabad-e Olya علي ابادعليا
- Village
- Location within Iran
- Coordinates: 30°21′46″N 52°11′04″E
- Country: Iran
- Province: Fars
- County: Marvdasht
- Bakhsh: Kamfiruz
- Rural District: Kamfiruz-e Jonubi

Population (2006)
  - Total: 1,556
- Time zone: UTC+3:30 (IRST)
  - Summer (DST): UTC+4:30 (IRDT)

Aliabad-e Olya (Persian: علي ابادعليا, also Romanized as 'Alīābād-e 'Olyā; also known as 'Alīābād, 'Alīābād-e Bālā, and 'Alīābād-e Kāmfīrūz-e 'Olyā) is a village in Kamfiruz-e Jonubi Rural District, Kamfiruz District, Marvdasht County, Fars province, Iran. At the 2006 census, its population was 1,556, in 344 families.
