= Shul-e Bozorg =

Shul-e Bozorg شول بزرگ
- Village
- Location within Iran
- Coordinates: 30°17′00″N 52°07′12″E
- Country: Iran
- Province: Fars
- County: Marvdasht
- Bakhsh: Kamfiruz
- Rural District: Khorram Makan

Population (2006)
  - Total: 936
- Time zone: UTC+3:30 (IRST)
  - Summer (DST): UTC+4:30 (IRDT)

Shul-e Bozorg (Persian: شول بزرگ, also Romanized as Shūl-e Bozorg; also known as Shūl) is a village in Khorram Makan Rural District, Kamfiruz District, Marvdasht County, Fars province, Iran. At the 2006 census, its population was 936, in 178 families.
