= Bizjan =

Bizjan (Persian: بيزجان) may refer to:

- Bizjan-e Olya
- Bizjan-e Sofla
