= Abbad, Fars =

Village in Fars province, Iran

Abbad Persian: اب باد
- Village
- Location within Iran
- Coordinates: 30°15′51″N 52°14′53″E
- Country: Iran
- Province: Fars
- County: Marvdasht
- District: Kamfiruz
- Rural District: Khorram Makan

Population (2016)
  - Total: 1,385
- Time zone: UTC+3:30 (IRST)

Abbad (Persian: اب باد) (Note: Also romanized as Ābbād; also known as Owbād) is a village in Khorram Makan Rural District of Kamfiruz District, Marvdasht County, Fars province, Iran.

== Demographics ==
=== Population ===
At the time of the 2006 National Census, the village's population was 1,161 in 226 households. The following census in 2011 counted 1,260 people in 309 households. The 2016 census measured the population of the village as 1,385 people in 351 households. It was the most populous village in its rural district.
