= Gol Makan-e Baseri =

Gol Makan-e Baseri گل مكان باصري
- Village
- Location within Iran
- Coordinates: 30°09′52″N 52°43′51″E
- Country: Iran
- Province: Fars
- County: Marvdasht
- Bakhsh: Dorudzan
- Rural District: Abarj

Population (2006)
  - Total: 519
- Time zone: UTC+3:30 (IRST)
  - Summer (DST): UTC+4:30 (IRDT)

Gol Makan-e Baseri (Persian: گل مكان باصري, also Romanized as Gol Makān-e Bāşerī; also known as Gol Makān-e Pā’īn, Gol Makān-e Soflá, Gol Makūn-e Bāşerī, and Qal‘eh-ye Pā’īn) is a village in Abarj Rural District, Dorudzan District, Marvdasht County, Fars province, Iran. At the 2006 census, its population was 519, in 122 families.
