= Hesamabad, Fars =

Hesamabad حسام اباد
- Village
- Location within Iran
- Coordinates: 30°09′20″N 52°32′23″E
- Country: Iran
- Province: Fars
- County: Marvdasht
- Bakhsh: Dorudzan
- Rural District: Dorudzan

Population (2006)
  - Total: 1,210
- Time zone: UTC+3:30 (IRST)
  - Summer (DST): UTC+4:30 (IRDT)

Hesamabad (Persian: حسام اباد, also Romanized as Ḩesāmābād; also known as Samāābād) is a village in Dorudzan Rural District, Dorudzan District, Marvdasht County, Fars province, Iran. At the 2006 census, its population was 1,210, in 291 families.
