= Bid Gol =

Bid Gol (Persian: بيدگل) may refer to:

- Bid Gol, Chaharmahal and Bakhtiari
- Bid Gol, Fars
- Bid Gol, Kermanshah
- Bid Gol, Lorestan
- Bidgol
