= Sahlabad, Ramjerd-e Do =

Sahlabad سهل اباد
- Village
- Location within Iran
- Coordinates: 30°00′03″N 52°29′51″E
- Country: Iran
- Province: Fars
- County: Marvdasht
- Bakhsh: Dorudzan
- Rural District: Ramjerd-e Do

Population (2006)
  - Total: 153
- Time zone: UTC+3:30 (IRST)
  - Summer (DST): UTC+4:30 (IRDT)

Sahlabad (Persian: سهل اباد, also Romanized as Sahlābād; also known as Aḩmadābād, Sahīlābād, Sātābād, and Sātābād) is a village in Ramjerd-e Do Rural District, Dorudzan District, Marvdasht County, Fars province, Iran. At the 2006 census, its population was 153, in 41 families.
