= Sar Bast, Marvdasht =

Sar Bast سربست
- Village
- Location within Iran
- Coordinates: 30°26′15″N 52°08′04″E
- Country: Iran
- Province: Fars
- County: Marvdasht
- Bakhsh: Kamfiruz
- Rural District: Kamfiruz-e Shomali

Population (2006)
  - Total: 467
- Time zone: UTC+3:30 (IRST)
  - Summer (DST): UTC+4:30 (IRDT)

Sar Bast (Persian: سربست; also known as Barmowbūreh, Sar Bas-e Baram Būreh, and Sar Bast-e Baram Būreh) is a village in Kamfiruz-e Shomali Rural District, Kamfiruz District, Marvdasht County, Fars province, Iran. At the 2006 census, its population was 467, in 105 families.
