= Khorram Makan =

Village in Fars province, Iran

Khorram Makan Persian: خرم مكان
- Village
- Location within Iran
- Coordinates: 30°16′35″N 52°16′17″E
- Country: Iran
- Province: Fars
- County: Marvdasht
- District: Kamfiruz
- Rural District: Khorram Makan

Population (2016)
  - Total: 695
- Time zone: UTC+3:30 (IRST)

Khorram Makan (Persian: خرم مكان) (Note: Also romanized as Khorram Makān; also known as Khorramkān) is a village in, and the capital of, Khorram Makan Rural District of Kamfiruz District, Marvdasht County, Fars province, Iran.

== Demographics ==
=== Population ===
At the time of the 2006 National Census, the village's population was 794 in 171 households. The following census in 2011 counted 822 people in 219 households. The 2016 census measured the population of the village as 695 people in 201 households.
