= Jarreh =

Jarreh or Jarrah (Persian: جره) may refer to:

- Jarreh-ye Olya
- Jarreh-ye Mian
