= Aliabad-e Sofla, Marvdasht =

Aliabad-e Sofla علي ابادسفلي
- Village
- Location within Iran
- Coordinates: 30°21′15″N 52°11′47″E
- Country: Iran
- Province: Fars
- County: Marvdasht
- Bakhsh: Kamfiruz
- Rural District: Kamfiruz-e Jonubi

Population (2006)
  - Total: 1,184
- Time zone: UTC+3:30 (IRST)
  - Summer (DST): UTC+4:30 (IRDT)

Aliabad-e Sofla (Persian: علي ابادسفلي, also Romanized as 'Alīābād-e Soflá; also known as 'Alīābād-e Kāmfīrūz-e Soflá and 'Alīābād-e Pā’īn) is a village in Kamfiruz-e Jonubi Rural District, Kamfiruz District, Marvdasht County, Fars province, Iran. At the 2006 census, its population was 1,184, in 264 families.
