= Palangi, Iran =

Palangi (Persian: پلنگي) may refer to:

- Palangi, Dashtestan, Bushehr Province
- Palangi, Jam, Bushehr Province
- Palangi, Fars
- Palangi, Hormozgan
- Palangi, Baft, Kerman Province
