= Gol Makan-e Qeshlaq =

Gol Makan-e Qeshlaq گل مكان قشلاق
- Village
- Location within Iran
- Coordinates: 30°10′34″N 52°43′53″E
- Country: Iran
- Province: Fars
- County: Marvdasht
- Bakhsh: Dorudzan
- Rural District: Abarj

Population (2006)
  - Total: 1,163
- Time zone: UTC+3:30 (IRST)
  - Summer (DST): UTC+4:30 (IRDT)

Gol Makan-e Qeshlaq (Persian: گل مكان قشلاق, also Romanized as Gol Makān-e Qeshlāq; also known as Gol Makān, Gol Makān-e Bālā, Gol Makān-e 'Olyā, and Gol Makūn-e Avraj) is a village in Abarj Rural District, Dorudzan District, Marvdasht County, Fars province, Iran. At the 2006 census, its population was 1,163, in 257 families.
