= Ab Mahi, Fars =

Ab Mahi اب ماهي
- Village
- Location within Iran
- Coordinates: 30°33′51″N 52°02′18″E
- Country: Iran
- Province: Fars
- County: Marvdasht
- Bakhsh: Kamfiruz
- Rural District: Kamfiruz-e Shomali

Population (2006)
  - Total: 184
- Time zone: UTC+3:30 (IRST)
  - Summer (DST): UTC+4:30 (IRDT)

Ab Mahi (Persian: اب ماهي, also Romanized as Āb Māhī) is a village in Kamfiruz-e Shomali Rural District, Kamfiruz District, Marvdasht County, Fars province, Iran. At the 2006 census, its population was 184, in 49 families.
