= Shahrak-e Abraj =

Village in Fars province, Iran

Shahrak-e Abraj Persian: شهرك ابرج
- Village
- Location within Iran
- Coordinates: 30°10′50″N 52°29′58″E
- Country: Iran
- Province: Fars
- County: Marvdasht
- District: Dorudzan
- Rural District: Dorudzan

Population (2016)
  - Total: 2,880
- Time zone: UTC+3:30 (IRST)

Shahrak-e Abraj (Persian: شهرك ابرج) (Note: Also known as Shahrak, Shahrak-e Abraj-e ‘Olyā, and Shahrak-e Qadīm Abraj) is a village in Dorudzan Rural District of Dorudzan District, Marvdasht County, Fars province, Iran.

== Demographics ==
=== Population ===
At the time of the 2006 National Census, the village's population was 2,747 in 606 households. The following census in 2011 counted 2,688 people in 710 households. The 2016 census measured the population of the village as 2,880 people in 805 households. It was the most populous village in its rural district.
