= Bizjan-e Sofla =

Bizjan-e Sofla بيزجان سفلي
- Village
- Location within Iran
- Coordinates: 30°10′38″N 52°28′23″E
- Country: Iran
- Province: Fars
- County: Marvdasht
- Bakhsh: Dorudzan
- Rural District: Ramjerd-e Do

Population (2006)
  - Total: 263
- Time zone: UTC+3:30 (IRST)
  - Summer (DST): UTC+4:30 (IRDT)

Bizjan-e Sofla (Persian: بيزجان سفلي, also Romanized as Bīzjān-e Soflá) is a village in Ramjerd-e Do Rural District, Dorudzan District, Marvdasht County, Fars province, Iran. At the 2006 census, its population was 263, in 57 families.
