= Golijan, Fars =

Golijan گلی جان
- village
- Location within Iran
- Coordinates: 30°13′16″N 52°27′47″E
- Country: Iran
- Province: Fars
- County: Marvdasht
- Bakhsh: Dorudzan
- Rural District: Dorudzan

Population (2006)
  - Total: 668
- Time zone: UTC+3:30 (IRST)
  - Summer (DST): UTC+4:30 (IRDT)

Golijan (Persian: گلی جان, also Romanized as Golījān) is a village in Dorudzan Rural District, Dorudzan District, Marvdasht County, Fars province, Iran. At the 2006 census, its population was 668, in 145 families.
