= Sahlabad, Abarj =

Sahlabad سهل اباد
- Village
- Location within Iran
- Coordinates: 30°09′57″N 52°41′41″E
- Country: Iran
- Province: Fars
- County: Marvdasht
- Bakhsh: Dorudzan
- Rural District: Abarj

Population (2006)
  - Total: 262
- Time zone: UTC+3:30 (IRST)
  - Summer (DST): UTC+4:30 (IRDT)

Sahlabad (Persian: سهل اباد, also Romanized as Sahlābād) is a village in Abarj Rural District, Dorudzan District, Marvdasht County, Fars province, Iran. At the 2006 census, its population was 262, in 49 families.

== See also ==
- List of cities, towns and villages in Fars province
