= Aliabad-e Kamfiruz =

Aliabad-e Kamfiruz (Persian: علي ابادکامفیروز) may refer to:

- Aliabad-e Kamfiruz-e Olya
- Aliabad-e Kamfiruz-e Sofla
