= Ab Mahi =

Ab Mahi or Ab-e Mahi (Persian: اب ماهي) may refer to:

- Ab Mahi, Fars
- Ab Mahi, Kohgiluyeh and Boyer-Ahmad
