= Bizjan-e Olya =

Bizjan-e Olya بيزجان عليا
- Village
- Location within Iran
- Coordinates: 30°11′11″N 52°27′20″E
- Country: Iran
- Province: Fars
- County: Marvdasht
- Bakhsh: Dorudzan
- Rural District: Ramjerd-e Do

Population (2006)
  - Total: 348
- Time zone: UTC+3:30 (IRST)
  - Summer (DST): UTC+4:30 (IRDT)

Bizjan-e Olya (Persian: بيزجان عليا, also Romanized as Bīzjān-e 'Olyā; also known as Bīzjān) is a village in Ramjerd-e Do Rural District, Dorudzan District, Marvdasht County, Fars province, Iran. At the 2006 census, its population was 348, in 80 families.
