= Mahjanabad =

Village in Fars province, Iran

Mahjanabad Persian: محجن اباد
- Village
- Location within Iran
- Coordinates: 30°20′18″N 52°11′34″E
- Country: Iran
- Province: Fars
- County: Marvdasht
- District: Kamfiruz
- Rural District: Kamfiruz-e Jonubi

Population (2016)
  - Total: 2,112
- Time zone: UTC+3:30 (IRST)

Mahjanabad (Persian: محجن اباد) (Note: Also romanized as Mahjanābād and Mahjenābād) is a village in Kamfiruz-e Jonubi Rural District of Kamfiruz District, Marvdasht County, Fars province, Iran.

== Demographics ==
=== Population ===
At the time of the 2006 National Census, the village's population was 2,019 in 463 households. The following census in 2011 counted 1,917 people in 528 households. The 2016 census measured the population of the village as 2,112 people in 627 households. It was the most populous village in its rural district.
