= Bozi =

Bozi may refer to:

- Boží Dar, town
- Bozi, Ivory Coast, town
- Bozi Boziana, Congolese guitarist and singer
- Bozi Jan, village
- Bozi, Iran, village
- Bozi, Fars, Iran, village
- Qaleh Bozi, cave complex
- Met Bozi, member of parliament

== Other ==
- Boji (disambiguation)
