= Kudin =

Kudin كودين
- Village
- Location within Iran
- Coordinates: 30°17′22″N 52°05′36″E
- Country: Iran
- Province: Fars
- County: Marvdasht
- Bakhsh: Kamfiruz
- Rural District: Khorram Makan

Population (2006)
  - Total: 419
- Time zone: UTC+3:30 (IRST)
  - Summer (DST): UTC+4:30 (IRDT)

Kudin (Persian: كودين, also Romanized as Kūdīn; also known as Kūdīān and Kū’īn) is a village in Khorram Makan Rural District, Kamfiruz District, Marvdasht County, Fars province, Iran. At the 2006 census, its population was 419, in 90 families.
