= Hesamabad =

Hesamabad (Persian: حسام اباد), also rendered as Hisamabad, may refer to:

- Hesamabad, Fars
- Hesamabad, Asadabad, Hamadan Province
- Hesamabad, Famenin, Hamadan Province
- Hesamabad, Khuzestan
- Hesamabad, Markazi
- Hesamabad, Qazvin
- Hesamabad, Zanjan
