= Garmeh, Fars =

Village in Fars province, Iran

Garmeh Persian: گرمه
- Village
- Location within Iran
- Coordinates: 30°30′55″N 52°05′03″E
- Country: Iran
- Province: Fars
- County: Marvdasht
- District: Kamfiruz-e Shomali
- Rural District: Garmeh

Population (2016)
  - Total: 733
- Time zone: UTC+3:30 (IRST)

Garmeh (Persian: گرمه) is a village in, and the capital of, Garmeh Rural District of Kamfiruz-e Shomali District, (Note: Formerly Kor District) Marvdasht County, Fars province, Iran.

== Demographics ==
=== Population ===
At the time of the 2006 National Census, the village's population was 682 in 153 households, when it was in Kamfiruz-e Shomali Rural District of Kamfiruz District. The following census in 2011 counted 588 people in 153 households, by which time the rural district had been separated from the district in the formation of Kor District. (Note: Renamed Kamfiruz-e Shomali District) Garmeh was transferred to Garmeh Rural District created in the new district. The 2016 census measured the population of the village as 733 people in 220 households.
