= Dorudzan =

Village in Fars province, Iran

Dorudzan Persian: درودزن
- Village
- Location within Iran
- Coordinates: 30°12′31″N 52°26′54″E
- Country: Iran
- Province: Fars
- County: Marvdasht
- District: Dorudzan
- Rural District: Dorudzan

Population (2016)
  - Total: 1,854
- Time zone: UTC+3:30 (IRST)

Dorudzan (Persian: درودزن) (Note: Also romanized as Dorūdzan and Drūdzan; also previously known as Chirkisabad in reference to its Circassian inhabitants) is a village in, and the capital of, Dorudzan Rural District of Dorudzan District, Marvdasht County, Fars province, Iran.

== Climate ==
Climate data for Doroodzan Dam(1988-2010 normals)
Month	Jan	Feb	Mar	Apr	May	Jun	Jul	Aug	Sep	Oct	Nov	Dec	Year
Daily mean °C (°F)	5.1 (41.2)	7.6 (45.7)	11.5 (52.7)	16.4 (61.5)	22.1 (71.8)	27.0 (80.6)	29.6 (85.3)	28.6 (83.5)	24.8 (76.6)	19.5 (67.1)	12.8 (55.0)	7.8 (46.0)	17.7 (63.9)
Average precipitation mm (inches)	116.4 (4.58)	97.5 (3.84)	76.6 (3.02)	41.4 (1.63)	4.8 (0.19)	0.3 (0.01)	0.9 (0.04)	0.3 (0.01)	0.0 (0.0)	6.4 (0.25)	33.1 (1.30)	97.6 (3.84)	475.3 (18.71)
Source: IRIMO

== Demographics ==
=== Population ===
At the time of the 2006 National Census, the village's population was 1,617 in 393 households. The following census in 2011 counted 1,505 people in 408 households. The 2016 census measured the population of the village as 1,854 people in 557 households.
