= Palangari-ye Kohneh =

Palangari-ye Kohneh پالنگري كهنه
- Village
- Location within Iran
- Coordinates: 30°18′56″N 52°17′01″E
- Country: Iran
- Province: Fars
- County: Marvdasht
- Bakhsh: Kamfiruz
- Rural District: Kamfiruz-e Shomali

Population (2006)
  - Total: 348
- Time zone: UTC+3:30 (IRST)
  - Summer (DST): UTC+4:30 (IRDT)

Palangari-ye Kohneh (Persian: پالنگري كهنه, also Romanized as Pālangarī-ye Kohneh) is a village in Kamfiruz-e Shomali Rural District, Kamfiruz District, Marvdasht County, Fars province, Iran. At the 2006 census, its population was 348, in 80 families.
