= Palangari =

Palangari (Persian: پالنگري) may refer to:

- Palangari-ye Kohneh
- Palangari-ye Now
