= Palangari-ye Now =

Palangari-ye Now پالنگري نو
- Village
- Location within Iran
- Coordinates: 30°19′45″N 52°16′50″E
- Country: Iran
- Province: Fars
- County: Marvdasht
- Bakhsh: Kamfiruz
- Rural District: Kamfiruz-e Shomali

Population (2006)
  - Total: 1,025
- Time zone: UTC+3:30 (IRST)
  - Summer (DST): UTC+4:30 (IRDT)

Palangari-ye Now (Persian: پالنگري نو, also Romanized as Pālangarī-ye Now; also known as Hajungri, Ḩālūngarī ye, and Pālangarī) is a village in Kamfiruz-e Shomali Rural District, Kamfiruz District, Marvdasht County, Fars province, Iran. At the 2006 census, its population was 1,025, in 259 families.
