= Chamani, Iran =

Village in Fars province, Iran

Chamani Persian: چمني
- Village
- Location within Iran
- Coordinates: 30°03′41″N 52°39′24″E
- Country: Iran
- Province: Fars
- County: Marvdasht
- District: Dorudzan
- Rural District: Ramjerd-e Do

Population (2016)
  - Total: 1,037
- Time zone: UTC+3:30 (IRST)

Chamani (Persian: چمني) (Note: Also romanized as Chamanī) is a village in Ramjerd-e Do Rural District of Dorudzan District, Marvdasht County, Fars province, Iran.

== Demographics ==
=== Population ===
At the time of the 2006 National Census, the village's population was 910 in 222 households. The following census in 2011 counted 1,029 people in 287 households. The 2016 census measured the population of the village as 1,037 people in 306 households. It was the most populous village in its rural district.
