= Shah Mansuri =

Shah Mansuri (Persian: شاه منصوري) may refer to:

- Shah Mansuri, Hormozgan
- Shah Mansuri, Ilam
- Shah Mansuri, Kerman

== See also ==
- Shah Mansur, Iran (disambiguation)
