= Darreh Bad =

Village in Fars province, Iran

Darreh Bad Persian: دره باد
- Village
- Location within Iran
- Coordinates: 30°12′45″N 52°33′15″E
- Country: Iran
- Province: Fars
- County: Marvdasht
- District: Dorudzan
- Rural District: Abarj

Population (2016)
  - Total: 1,575
- Time zone: UTC+3:30 (IRST)

Darreh Bad (Persian: دره باد) (Note: Also romanized as Darreh Bād) is a village in Abarj Rural District of Dorudzan District, Marvdasht County, Fars province, Iran.

== Demographics ==
=== Population ===
At the time of the 2006 National Census, the village's population was 1,411 in 306 households. The following census in 2011 counted 1,350 people in 341 households. The 2016 census measured the population of the village as 1,575 people in 424 households. It was the most populous village in its rural district.
