= Saba, Iran =

Village in Bushehr province, Iran

Saba Persian: سبا
- Village
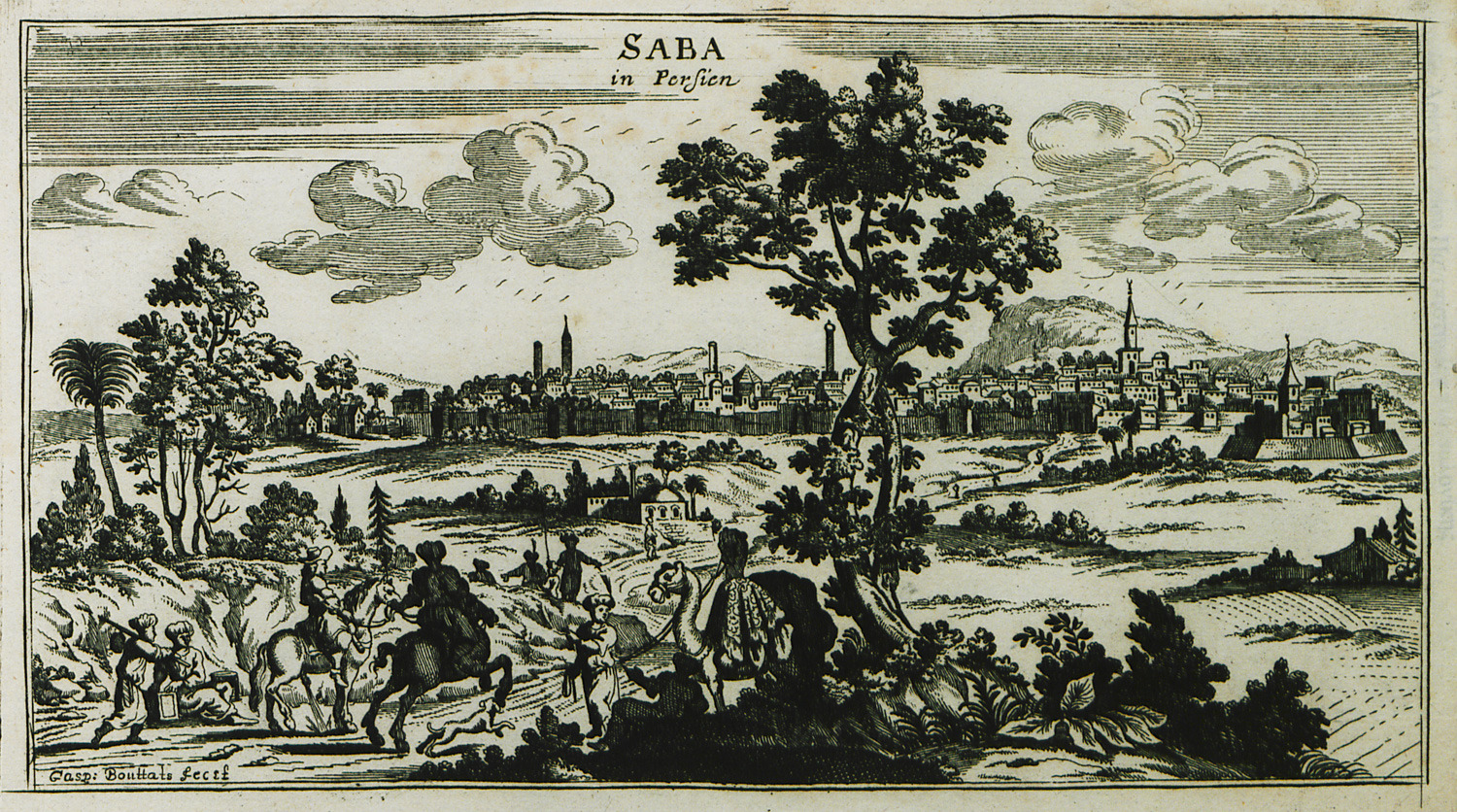
- Saba in 1690

- Location within Iran
- Country: Iran
- Province: Bushehr
- County: Dashtestan
- District: Sadabad
- Rural District: Vahdatiyeh

Population (2016)
  - Total: 77
- Time zone: UTC+3:30 (IRST)

Saba (Persian: سبا) (Note: Also romanized as Sabā; also known as Dakān Sorkh (ڈكان سرخ)) is a village in Vahdatiyeh Rural District of Sadabad District in Dashtestan County, Bushehr province, Iran.

== Demographics ==
=== Population ===
At the time of the 2006 National Census, the village's population was 107 in 24 households. The following census in 2011 counted 85 people in 26 households. The 2016 census measured the population of the village as 77 people in 20 households.
