= Nazar Aqa =

Village in Bushehr province, Iran

Nazar Aqa Persian: نظراقا
- Village
- Location within Iran
- Coordinates: 29°22′36″N 51°10′56″E
- Country: Iran
- Province: Bushehr
- County: Dashtestan
- District: Sadabad
- Rural District: Zirrah

Population (2016)
  - Total: 2,649
- Time zone: UTC+3:30 (IRST)

Nazar Aqa (Persian: نظراقا) (Note: Also romanized as Naz̧ar Āqā; also known as Naz̧ar Āqā’ī) is a village in, and the capital of Zirrah Rural District in Sadabad District of Dashtestan County, Bushehr province, Iran.

== Demographics ==
=== Population ===
At the time of the 2006 National Census, the village's population was 2,146 in 473 households. The following census in 2011 counted 2,474 people in 665 households. The 2016 census measured the population of the village as 2,649 people in 788 households.
