= Shah Qasem =

Village in Bushehr province, Iran

Shah Qasem Persian: شاه قاسم
- Village
- Location within Iran
- Country: Iran
- Province: Bushehr
- County: Dashtestan
- District: Sadabad
- Rural District: Vahdatiyeh

Population (2016)
  - Total: 0
- Time zone: UTC+3:30 (IRST)

Shah Qasem (Persian: شاه قاسم) (Note: Also romanized as Shāh Qāsem; also known as Sheykh Qāsem) is a village in Vahdatiyeh Rural District of Sadabad District in Dashtestan County, Bushehr province, Iran.

== Demographics ==
=== Population ===
At the time of the 2006 National Census, the village's population was 55 in nine households. The following census in 2011 counted 49 people in 14 households. The 2016 census measured the population of the village as zero.
