= Al-e Yusefi-ye Olya =

Village in Bushehr province, Iran

Al-e Yusefi-ye Olya Persian: ال يوسفي عليا
- Village
- Location within Iran
- Coordinates: 29°23′45″N 51°09′46″E
- Country: Iran
- Province: Bushehr
- County: Dashtestan
- District: Sadabad
- Rural District: Zirrah

Population (2016)
  - Total: 193
- Time zone: UTC+3:30 (IRST)

Al-e Yusefi-ye Olya (Persian: ال يوسفي عليا) (Note: Also romanized as Āl-e Yūsefī-ye ‘Olyā and Āl-e Yūsofī-ye ‘Olyā; also known as Āl-e Sefī-ye Bālā, Āl-e Yūsefī-ye Bālā, Āl-e Yūsofī, and Āl-e Yūsofī-ye Bālā) is a village in Zirrah Rural District of Sadabad District in Dashtestan County, Bushehr province, Iran.

== Demographics ==
=== Population ===
At the time of the 2006 National Census, the village's population was 222 in 53 households. The following census in 2011 counted 199 people in 51 households. The 2016 census measured the population of the village as 193 people in 62 households.
