= Kuin =

Kuin (Persian: كويين) or KUIN may refer to:

- Kuin, Alborz, Iran
- Kuin, Fars, Iran
- Quincy Regional Airport, ICAO code KUIN
- Kuin or kuri (kitchen), the building housing the kitchen of a Zen temple
