= Tol-e Sar Kuh =

Village in Bushehr province, Iran

Tol-e Sar Kuh Persian: تل سركوه
- Village
- Location within Iran
- Coordinates: 29°25′47″N 51°10′02″E
- Country: Iran
- Province: Bushehr
- County: Dashtestan
- District: Sadabad
- Rural District: Zirrah

Population (2016)
  - Total: 1,085
- Time zone: UTC+3:30 (IRST)

Tol-e Sar Kuh (Persian: تل سركوه) (Note: Also romanized as Tall-e Sarkūh and Tol-e Sar Kūh; also known as Tol-e Sarkūb) is a village in Zirrah Rural Districtv of Sadabad District in Dashtestan County, Bushehr province, Iran.

== Demographics ==
=== Population ===
At the time of the 2006 National Census, the village's population was 1,036 in 206 households. The following census in 2011 counted 916 people in 224 households. The 2016 census measured the population of the village as 1,085 people in 325 households.
