= Goli Jan =

Goli Jan or Golijan (Persian: گلی‌جان) may refer to:

- Goli Jan, Ardabil
- Golijan, Fars
- Goli Jan, Mazandaran
- Goli Jan Rural District, in Mazandaran Province
