= Eslamabad, Dashtestan =

Village in Bushehr province, Iran

Eslamabad Persian: اسلام اباد
- Village
- Location within Iran
- Coordinates: 29°27′34″N 51°12′17″E
- Country: Iran
- Province: Bushehr
- County: Dashtestan
- District: Sadabad
- Rural District: Zirrah

Population (2016)
  - Total: 232
- Time zone: UTC+3:30 (IRST)

Eslamabad (Persian: اسلام اباد) (Note: Also romanized as Eslāmābād) is a village in Zirrah Rural District of Sadabad District in Dashtestan County, Bushehr province, Iran.

== Demographics ==
=== Population ===
At the time of the 2006 National Census, the village's population was 243 in 52 households. The following census in 2011 counted 226 people in 50 households. The 2016 census measured the population of the village as 232 people in 58 households.
