= Shul-e Bozi =

Shul-e Bozi شول بزي
- Village
- Location within Iran
- Coordinates: 30°16′11″N 52°08′51″E
- Country: Iran
- Province: Fars
- County: Marvdasht
- Bakhsh: Kamfiruz
- Rural District: Khorram Makan

Population (2006)
  - Total: 850
- Time zone: UTC+3:30 (IRST)
  - Summer (DST): UTC+4:30 (IRDT)

Shul-e Bozi (Persian: شول بزي, also Romanized as Shūl-e Bozī; also known as Bozī and Shūn Bozī) is a village in Khorram Makan Rural District, Kamfiruz District, Marvdasht County, Fars province, Iran. At the 2006 census, its population was 850, in 147 families.
