= Shah Mansur, Iran =

Shah Mansur (Persian: شاه منصور) may refer to:

- Shah Mansur, East Azerbaijan
- Shah Mansur, Ilam

== See also ==
- Shah Mansuri (disambiguation)
