= Sarqanat, Bushehr =

Village in Bushehr province, Iran

Sarqanat Persian: سرقنات
- Village
- Location within Iran
- Coordinates: 29°27′55″N 51°16′06″E
- Country: Iran
- Province: Bushehr
- County: Dashtestan
- District: Sadabad
- Rural District: Vahdatiyeh

Population (2016)
  - Total: 1,052
- Time zone: UTC+3:30 (IRST)

Sarqanat (Persian: سرقنات) (Note: Also romanized as Sarqanāt) is a village in Vahdatiyeh Rural District of Sadabad District in Dashtestan County, Bushehr province, Iran.

== Demographics ==
=== Population ===
At the time of the 2006 National Census, the village's population was 907 in 205 households. The following census in 2011 counted 994 people in 250 households. The 2016 census measured the population of the village as 1,052 people in 281 households. It was the most populous village in its rural district.
