= Sadabad =

Sadabad or Saadabad or Sa'adabad (Persian: سعدآباد) may refer to:

- Sadabad, India
- Sadabad, Iran (disambiguation), multiple places
