= Garmeh Rural District =

Rural district in Fars province, Iran

Garmeh Rural District Persian: دهستان گرمه
- Rural District
- Location within Iran
- Coordinates: 30°18′56″N 52°17′16″E
- Country: Iran
- Province: Fars
- County: Marvdasht
- District: Kamfiruz-e Shomali
- Capital: Garmeh

Population (2016)
  - Total: 5,591
- Time zone: UTC+3:30 (IRST)

Garmeh Rural District (Persian: دهستان گرمه) is in Kamfiruz-e Shomali District (Note: Formerly Kor District) of Marvdasht County, Fars province, Iran. Its capital is the village of Garmeh.

== History ==
In 2010, Kamfiruz-e Shomali Rural District was separated from Kamfiruz District in the formation of Kor District, (Note: Renamed Kamfiruz-e Shomali District) and Garmeh Rural District was created in the new district.

== Demographics ==
=== Population ===
At the time of the 2011 National Census, the rural district's population was 8,771 in 2,489 households. The 2016 census measured the population of the rural district as 5,591 in 1,673 households. The most populous of its 15 villages was Bakian, with 1,590 people.
