= Dorudgah =

Village in Bushehr province, Iran

Dorudgah Persian: دورودگاه
- Village
- Location within Iran
- Coordinates: 29°20′05″N 51°06′41″E
- Country: Iran
- Province: Bushehr
- County: Dashtestan
- District: Sadabad
- Rural District: Zirrah

Population (2016)
  - Total: 2,820
- Time zone: UTC+3:30 (IRST)

Dorudgah (Persian: دورودگاه) (Note: Also romanized as Dowrūdgāh; also known as Darudgah, Doroūdgāh, and Drūdgāh) is a village in Zirrah Rural District of Sadabad District in Dashtestan County, Bushehr province, Iran.

== Demographics ==
=== Population ===
At the time of the 2006 National Census, the village's population was 2,640 in 547 households. The following census in 2011 counted 3,090 people in 750 households. The 2016 census measured the population of the village as 2,820 people in 832 households. It was the most populous village in its rural district.
