= Bashirabad, Bushehr =

Village in Bushehr province, Iran

Bashirabad Persian: بشیرآباد
- Village
- Location within Iran
- Coordinates: 29°24′15″N 51°11′20″E
- Country: Iran
- Province: Bushehr
- County: Dashtestan
- District: Sadabad
- Rural District: Zirrah

Population (2016)
  - Total: 1,331
- Time zone: UTC+3:30 (IRST)

Bashirabad (Persian: بشیرآباد) (Note: Also romanized as Bashīrābād) is a village in Zirrah Rural District of Sadabad District in Dashtestan County, Bushehr province, Iran.

== Demographics ==
=== Population ===
At the time of the 2006 National Census, the village's population was 1,423 in 275 households. The following census in 2011 counted 1,324 people in 320 households. The 2016 census measured the population of the village as 1,331 people in 380 households.
