= Halpahi =

Village in Bushehr province, Iran

Halpahi Persian: هلپه اي
- Village
- Location within Iran
- Coordinates: 29°24′23″N 51°09′57″E
- Country: Iran
- Province: Bushehr
- County: Dashtestan
- District: Sadabad
- Rural District: Zirrah

Population (2016)
  - Total: 1,427
- Time zone: UTC+3:30 (IRST)

Halpahi (Persian: هلپه اي) (Note: Also romanized as Halpah’ī, Halpehī, and Helpeh’ī; also known as Halpi, Helpeh, and Helpī) is a village in Zirrah Rural District of Sadabad District in Dashtestan County, Bushehr province, Iran.

== Demographics ==
=== Population ===
At the time of the 2006 National Census, the village's population was 621 in 154 households. The following census in 2011 counted 1,477 people in 352 households. The 2016 census measured the population of the village as 1,427 people in 395 households.
