= Khaniman =

City in Fars province, Iran

Khaniman Persian: خانيمن
- City
- Location within Iran
- Coordinates: 30°20′57″N 52°14′38″E
- Country: Iran
- Province: Fars
- County: Marvdasht
- District: Kamfiruz-e Shomali

Population (2016)
  - Total: 3,020
- Time zone: UTC+3:30 (IRST)

Khaniman (Persian: خانيمن) (Note: Also romanized as Khānīman; also known as Khānemān) is a city in, and the capital of, Kamfiruz-e Shomali District (Note: Formerly Kor District) of Marvdasht County, Fars province, Iran, and also serves as the administrative center for Kamfiruz-e Shomali Rural District.

== Demographics ==
=== Population ===
At the time of the 2006 National Census, Khaniman's population was 3,498 in 917 households, when it was a village in Kamfiruz-e Shomali Rural District of Kamfiruz District. The following census in 2011 counted 3,183 people in 970 households, by which time the rural district had been separated from the district in the formation of Kor District. (Note: Renamed Kamfiruz-e Shomali District) The 2016 census measured the population as 3,020 people in 919 households, when the village had been elevated to the status of a city.
