= Bid Gol, Fars =

Village in Fars province, Iran

Bid Gol Persian: بيدگل
- Village
- Location within Iran
- Coordinates: 30°10′11″N 52°37′44″E
- Country: Iran
- Province: Fars
- County: Marvdasht
- District: Dorudzan
- Rural District: Abarj

Population (2016)
  - Total: 1,132
- Time zone: UTC+3:30 (IRST)

Bid Gol (Persian: بيدگل) (Note: Also romanized as Bīd Gol) is a village in, and the capital of, Abarj Rural District of Dorudzan District, Marvdasht County, Fars province, Iran.

== Demographics ==
=== Population ===
At the time of the 2006 National Census, the village's population was 1,028 in 211 households. The following census in 2011 counted 1,113 people in 283 households. The 2016 census measured the population of the village as 1,132 people in 324 households.
