= Jetut =

Village in Bushehr province, Iran

Jetut Persian: جتوط
- Village
- Location within Iran
- Coordinates: 29°21′27″N 51°08′52″E
- Country: Iran
- Province: Bushehr
- County: Dashtestan
- District: Sadabad
- Rural District: Zirrah

Population (2016)
  - Total: 1,143
- Time zone: UTC+3:30 (IRST)

Jetut (Persian: جتوط) (Note: Also romanized as Jatūţ and Jetūţ; also known as Jāteyāl, Jatīāl, Jatyāl, Jetal, and Jonūţ) is a village in Zirrah Rural District of Sadabad District in Dashtestan County, Bushehr province, Iran.

== Demographics ==
=== Population ===
At the time of the 2006 National Census, the village's population was 1,063 in 231 households. The following census in 2011 counted 1,157 people in 308 households. The 2016 census measured the population of the village as 1,143 people in 334 households.
