= Ramjerd =

City in Fars province, Iran

Ramjerd Persian: رامجرد
- City
- Location within Iran
- Coordinates: 30°04′29″N 52°35′29″E
- Country: Iran
- Province: Fars
- County: Marvdasht
- District: Dorudzan

Population (2016)
  - Total: 2,550
- Time zone: UTC+3:30 (IRST)

Ramjerd (Persian: رامجرد) (Note: Formerly, Kushkak (كوشكك), also romanized as Kūshkak) is a city in, and the capital of, Dorudzan District of Marvdasht County, Fars province, Iran. It also serves as the administrative center for Ramjerd-e Do Rural District.

== Demographics ==
=== Population ===
At the time of the 2006 National Census, the population was 2,033 in 446 households, when it was the village of Kushkak in Ramjerd-e Do Rural District. The following census in 2011 counted 2,260 people in 566 households, by which time the village had been elevated to the status of a city and renamed Ramjerd. The 2016 census measured the population of the city as 2,550 people in 713 households.
