= Vahdatiyeh Rural District =

Rural district in Bushehr province, Iran

Vahdatiyeh Rural District Persian: دهستان وحدتيه
- Rural District
- Location within Iran
- Coordinates: 29°36′N 51°10′E
- Country: Iran
- Province: Bushehr
- County: Dashtestan
- District: Sadabad
- Established: 1987
- Capital: Vahdatiyeh

Population (2016)
  - Total: 1,724
- Time zone: UTC+3:30 (IRST)

Vahdatiyeh Rural District (Persian: دهستان وحدتيه) is in Sadabad District of Dashtestan County, Bushehr province, Iran. It is administered from the city of Vahdatiyeh.

== Demographics ==
=== Population ===
At the time of the 2006 National Census, the rural district's population was 2,120 in 450 households. There were 1,717 inhabitants in 428 households at the following census of 2011. The 2016 census measured the population of the rural district as 1,724 in 473 households. The most populous of its 20 villages was Sarqanat, with 1,052 people.

=== Other villages in the rural district ===
- Barang-e Bozorg
- Barang-e Kuchak
- Jarreh-ye Mian
- Jarreh-ye Olya
- Saba
- Shah Qasem
- Shul
- Siah Mansur-e Olya
- Siah Mansur-e Sofla
