= Siah Mansur-e Olya =

Village in Bushehr province, Iran

Siah Mansur-e Olya Persian: سياه منصورعليا
- Village
- Location within Iran
- Coordinates: 29°30′40″N 51°08′50″E
- Country: Iran
- Province: Bushehr
- County: Dashtestan
- District: Sadabad
- Rural District: Vahdatiyeh

Population (2016)
  - Total: 41
- Time zone: UTC+3:30 (IRST)

Siah Mansur-e Olya (Persian: سياه منصورعليا) (Note: Also romanized as Seyāh Manşūr-e ‘Olyā and Sīāh Manşūr-e ‘Olya; also known as Sīah Mansūr Bālā and Sīāh Manşūr-e Bālā) is a village in Vahdatiyeh Rural District of Sadabad District in Dashtestan County, Bushehr province, Iran.

== Demographics ==
=== Population ===
At the time of the 2006 National Census, the village's population was 42 in 11 households. The following census in 2011 counted 40 people in nine households. The 2016 census measured the population of the village as 41 people in 11 households.
