= Barang-e Bozorg =

Village in Bushehr province, Iran

Barang-e Bozorg Persian: برنگ بزرگ
- Village
- Location within Iran
- Coordinates: 29°40′57″N 51°10′12″E
- Country: Iran
- Province: Bushehr
- County: Dashtestan
- District: Sadabad
- Rural District: Vahdatiyeh

Population (2016)
  - Total: 0
- Time zone: UTC+3:30 (IRST)

Barang-e Bozorg (Persian: برنگ بزرگ) (Note: Also known as Barang, Barmak-e Bozorg, and Bernag-e Bozorg) is a village in Vahdatiyeh Rural District of Sadabad District in Dashtestan County, Bushehr province, Iran.

== Demographics ==
=== Population ===
At the time of the 2006 National Census, the village's population was 78 in 13 households. The village did not appear in the following census of 2011. The 2016 census measured the population of the village as zero.
