= Boji (disambiguation) =

Boji is a former woreda (district) in the Oromia Region of Ethiopia.

Boji may also refer to:

- Boji Tower, building in Lansing, Michigan, United States completed in 1931
- Boji (dog), a street dog in Istanbul

People with the surname Boji include:

- Aimé Boji, Congolese politician

== See also ==
- Bozi (disambiguation)
