= Zirrah, Bushehr =

Village in Bushehr province, Iran

Zirrah Persian: زيرراه
- Village
- Location within Iran
- Coordinates: 29°24′51″N 51°09′01″E
- Country: Iran
- Province: Bushehr
- County: Dashtestan
- District: Sadabad
- Rural District: Zirrah

Population (2016)
  - Total: 93
- Time zone: UTC+3:30 (IRST)

Zirrah (Persian: زيرراه) (Note: Also romanized as Zīr Rāh, Zīrāh, and Zīrrāh; also known as Sīr Rāh, Sīr-e Rāh, Zira, and Zīreh) is a village in Zirrah Rural District of Sadabad District in Dashtestan County, Bushehr province, Iran.

== Demographics ==
=== Population ===
At the time of the 2006 National Census, the village's population was 136 in 31 households. The following census in 2011 counted 143 people in 38 households. The 2016 census measured the population of the village as 93 people in 32 households.
