= Jarreh-ye Mian =

Village in Bushehr province, Iran

Jarreh-ye Mian Persian: جره ميان
- Village
- Location within Iran
- Coordinates: 29°33′27″N 51°08′37″E
- Country: Iran
- Province: Bushehr
- County: Dashtestan
- District: Sadabad
- Rural District: Vahdatiyeh

Population (2016)
  - Total: 149
- Time zone: UTC+3:30 (IRST)

Jarreh-ye Mian (Persian: جره ميان) (Note: Also romanized as Jarreh-e Meyān, Jarreh-i-Miyān, and Jarreh-ye Mīān; also known as Jarmīān and Jarreh-ye Vostá) is a village in Vahdatiyeh Rural District of Sadabad District in Dashtestan County, Bushehr province, Iran.

== Demographics ==
=== Population ===
At the time of the 2006 National Census, the village's population was 172 in 39 households. The following census in 2011 counted 140 people in 37 households. The 2016 census measured the population of the village as 149 people in 44 households.
