= Barmak, Bushehr =

Village in Bushehr province, Iran

Barmak Persian: برمك
- Village
- Location within Iran
- Coordinates: 29°25′20″N 51°09′49″E
- Country: Iran
- Province: Bushehr
- County: Dashtestan
- District: Sadabad
- Rural District: Zirrah

Population (2016)
  - Total: 673
- Time zone: UTC+3:30 (IRST)

Barmak (Persian: برمك) is a village in Zirrah Rural District of Sadabad District in Dashtestan County, Bushehr province, Iran.

== Demographics ==
=== Population ===
At the time of the 2006 National Census, the village's population was 621 in 154 households. The following census in 2011 counted 579 people in 144 households. The 2016 census measured the population of the village as 673 people in 196 households.
