= Vahdatiyeh =

City in Bushehr province, Iran

Vahdatiyeh Persian: وحدتيه
- City
- Location within Iran
- Coordinates: 29°29′03″N 51°13′55″E
- Country: Iran
- Province: Bushehr
- County: Dashtestan
- District: Sadabad
- Established as a city: 2000

Population (2016)
  - Total: 11,222
- Time zone: UTC+3:30 (IRST)

Vahdatiyeh (Persian: وحدتيه) (Note: Also romanized as Vaḩdattīyeh) is a city in Sadabad District of Dashtestan County, Bushehr province, Iran, serving as the administrative center for Vahdatiyeh Rural District. The village of Vahdatiyeh was converted to a city in 2000.

== Demographics ==
=== Population ===
At the time of the 2006 National Census, the city's population was 11,023 in 2,250 households. The following census in 2011 counted 11,414 people in 2,956 households. The 2016 census measured the population of the city as 11,222 people in 3,162 households.
