= Shul, Dashtestan =

Village in Bushehr province, Iran

Shul Persian: شول
- Village
- Location within Iran
- Coordinates: 29°28′28″N 51°09′05″E
- Country: Iran
- Province: Bushehr
- County: Dashtestan
- District: Sadabad
- Rural District: Vahdatiyeh

Population (2016)
  - Total: 338
- Time zone: UTC+3:30 (IRST)

Shul (Persian: شول,) (Note: Also romanized as Shūl; also known as Shūl-e Pasakūn and Shūl-e Paskūn) is a village in Vahdatiyeh Rural District of Sadabad District in Dashtestan County, Bushehr province, Iran.

== Demographics ==
=== Population ===
At the time of the 2006 National Census, the village's population was 378 in 79 households. The following census in 2011 counted 301 people in 66 households. The 2016 census measured the population of the village as 338 people in 98 households.
