= Jarreh-ye Olya =

Village in Bushehr province, Iran

Jarreh-ye Olya Persian: جره عليا
- Village
- Location within Iran
- Coordinates: 29°34′57″N 51°07′43″E
- Country: Iran
- Province: Bushehr
- County: Dashtestan
- District: Sadabad
- Rural District: Vahdatiyeh

Population (2016)
  - Total: 20
- Time zone: UTC+3:30 (IRST)

Jarreh-ye Olya (Persian: جره عليا) (Note: Also romanized as Jarreh-ye ‘Olyā; also known as Jarrah-e Bālā and Jarreh-ye Bālā) is a village in Vahdatiyeh Rural District of Sadabad District in Dashtestan County, Bushehr province, Iran.

== Demographics ==
=== Population ===
At the time of the 2006 National Census, the village's population was 28 in eight households. The following census in 2011 counted 18 people in four households. The 2016 census measured the population of the village as 20 people in five households.
