= Shul-e Sarui =

Shul-e Sarui شول سارويي
- Village
- Location within Iran
- Coordinates: 30°00′59″N 52°52′04″E
- Country: Iran
- Province: Fars
- County: Marvdasht
- Bakhsh: Central
- Rural District: Naqsh-e Rostam

Population (2006)
  - Total: 1,396
- Time zone: UTC+3:30 (IRST)
  - Summer (DST): UTC+4:30 (IRDT)

Shul-e Sarui (Persian: شول سارويي, also Romanized as Shūl-e Sārū’ī; also known as Shūl) is a village in Naqsh-e Rostam Rural District, in the Central District of Marvdasht County, Fars province, Iran. At the 2006 census, its population was 1,396, in 320 families.
