= Barang-e Kuchak =

Village in Bushehr province, Iran

Barang-e Kuchak Persian: برنگ كوچك
- Village
- Location within Iran
- Country: Iran
- Province: Bushehr
- County: Dashtestan
- District: Sadabad
- Rural District: Vahdatiyeh

Population (2016)
  - Total: 0
- Time zone: UTC+3:30 (IRST)

Barang-e Kuchak (Persian: برنگ كوچك) (Note: Also romanized as Barang-e Kūchak, Barang-e Kūchek, and Berang-e Kūchek; also known as Barmak-e Kūchek) is a village in Vahdatiyeh Rural District of Sadabad District in Dashtestan County, Bushehr province, Iran.

== Demographics ==
=== Population ===
At the time of the 2006 National Census, the village's population was 51 in seven households. The following census in 2011 counted 23 people in five households. The 2016 census measured the population of the village as zero.
