= Siah Mansur-e Sofla =

Village in Bushehr province, Iran

Siah Mansur-e Sofla Persian: سياه منصورسفلي
- Village
- Location within Iran
- Coordinates: 29°30′03″N 51°09′07″E
- Country: Iran
- Province: Bushehr
- County: Dashtestan
- District: Sadabad
- Rural District: Vahdatiyeh

Population (2016)
  - Total: 43
- Time zone: UTC+3:30 (IRST)

Siah Mansur-e Sofla (Persian: سياه منصورسفلي) (Note: Also romanized as Seyāh Manşūr-e Soflá and Sīāh Manşūr-e Soflá; also known as Sīāh Mansūr, Sīāh Manşūr-e Pā’īn, and Sīyāh Mansūr) is a village in Vahdatiyeh Rural District of Sadabad District in Dashtestan County, Bushehr province, Iran.

== Demographics ==
=== Population ===
At the time of the 2006 National Census, the village's population was 111 in 22 households. The following census in 2011 counted 61 people in 15 households. The 2016 census measured the population of the village as 43 people in 12 households.
