= Sarbast, Dashtestan =

Village in Bushehr province, Iran

Sarbast Persian: سربست
- Village
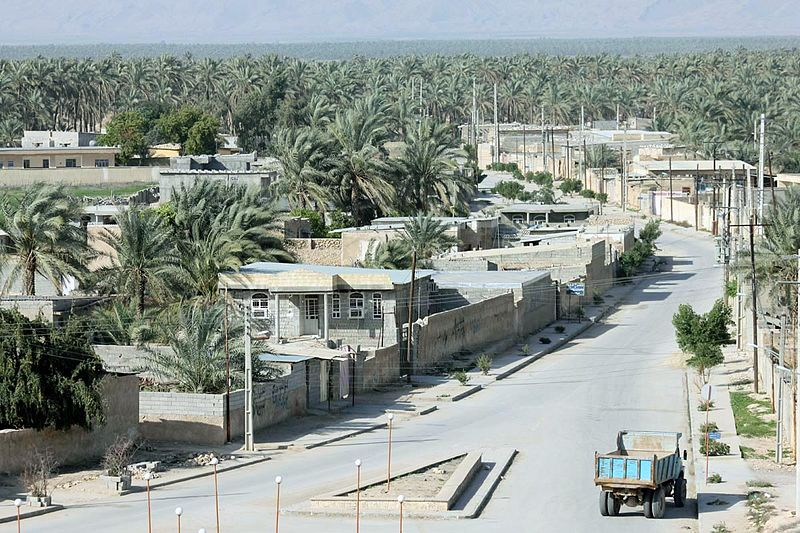
- The main street of the village of Sarbast

- Location within Iran
- Coordinates: 29°24′01″N 51°13′12″E
- Country: Iran
- Province: Bushehr
- County: Dashtestan
- District: Sadabad
- Rural District: Zirrah

Population (2016)
  - Total: 673
- Time zone: UTC+3:30 (IRST)
- Website: http://www.sarbast.ir

Sarbast (Persian: سربست) is a village in Zirrah Rural District of Sadabad District in Dashtestan County, Bushehr province, Iran.

The major crops are dates, wheat and barley. The area has hot summers, sometimes with high humidity, and mild, pleasant winters.

== Demographics ==
=== Population ===
At the time of the 2006 national census, the village's population was 675 in 132 households. The following census in 2011 counted 697 people in 168 households. The 2016 census measured the population of the village as 673 people in 190 households.
