= Bozi, Ivory Coast =

Bozi
- Village
- Location in Ivory Coast
- Coordinates: 6°55′N 5°32′W
- Country: Ivory Coast
- District: Sassandra-Marahoué
- Region: Marahoué
- Department: Bouaflé
- Sub-prefecture: Bouaflé
- Time zone: UTC+0 (GMT)

Bozi is a village in central Ivory Coast. It is in the sub-prefecture of Bouaflé, Bouaflé Department, Marahoué Region, Sassandra-Marahoué District.

Bozi was a commune until March 2012, when it became one of 1,126 communes nationwide that were abolished.
