= Bashkirsky Barmak =

Bashkirsky Barmak Башкирский Бармак
- Village
- Location within Bashkortostan Location within Russia
- Coordinates: 51°39′N 57°12′E
- Country: Russia
- Region: Bashkortostan
- District: Zianchurinsky District
- Time zone: UTC+5:00

Bashkirsky Barmak (Russian: Башкирский Бармак; Bashkir: Башҡорт Бармағы, Başqort Barmağı) is a rural locality (a village) in Yanybayevsky Selsoviet, Zianchurinsky District, Bashkortostan, Russia. The population was 95 as of 2010. There are 3 streets.

== Geography ==
Bashkirsky Barmak is located 152 km southeast of Isyangulovo (the district's administrative centre) by road. Nizhneye Mambetshino is the nearest rural locality.
