= Sadabad, Yazd =

Sadabad سعداباد
- Village
- Location within Iran
- Coordinates: 31°46′15″N 53°48′18″E
- Country: Iran
- Province: Yazd
- County: Taft
- Bakhsh: Central
- Rural District: Nasrabad

Population (2006)
  - Total: 71
- Time zone: UTC+3:30 (IRST)
  - Summer (DST): UTC+4:30 (IRDT)

Sadabad (Persian: سعداباد, romanized: Sa‘dābād) is a village in Nasrabad Rural District, in the Central District of Taft County, Yazd Province, Iran. At the 2006 census, its population was 71, in 27 families.
