= Sahlabad, Shiraz =

Sahlabad سهل اباد
- Village
- Location within Iran
- Coordinates: 29°19′04″N 52°15′55″E
- Country: Iran
- Province: Fars
- County: Shiraz
- Bakhsh: Central
- Rural District: Siyakh Darengun

Population (2006)
  - Total: 133
- Time zone: UTC+3:30 (IRST)
  - Summer (DST): UTC+4:30 (IRDT)

Sahlabad (Persian: سهل اباد, also Romanized as Sahlābād) is a village in Siyakh Darengun Rural District, in the Central District of Shiraz County, Fars province, Iran. At the 2006 census, its population was 133, in 33 families.
