= Zirrah Rural District =

Rural district in Bushehr province, Iran

Zirrah Rural District Persian: دهستان زيرراه
- Rural District
- Location within Iran
- Coordinates: 29°23′N 51°11′E
- Country: Iran
- Province: Bushehr
- County: Dashtestan
- District: Sadabad
- Established: 1987
- Capital: Nazar Aqa

Population (2016)
  - Total: 12,319
- Time zone: UTC+3:30 (IRST)

Zirrah Rural District (Persian: دهستان زيرراه) is in Sadabad District of Dashtestan County, Bushehr province, Iran. Its capital is the village of Nazar Aqa.

== Demographics ==
=== Population ===
At the time of the 2006 National Census, the rural district's population was 11,666 in 2,484 households. There were 12,282 inhabitants in 3,070 households at the following census of 2011. The 2016 census measured the population of the rural district as 12,319 in 3,592 households. The most populous of its 15 villages was Dorudgah, with 2,820 people.

=== Other villages in the rural district ===
- Al-e Yusefi-ye Olya
- Barmak
- Bashirabad
- Eslamabad
- Halpahi
- Jetut
- Sarbast
- Tol-e Sar Kuh
- Zirrah
