= Sadabad, Iran =

City in Bushehr province, Iran

Sadabad Persian: سعد آباد
- City
- Location within Iran
- Coordinates: 29°23′15″N 51°07′01″E
- Country: Iran
- Province: Bushehr
- County: Dashtestan
- District: Sadabad

Population (2016)
  - Total: 8,248
- Time zone: UTC+3:30 (IRST)

Sadabad (Persian: سعد آباد) (Note: Also romanized as Sa‘dābād) is a city in, and the capital of, Sadabad District in Dashtestan County, Bushehr province, Iran.

== Demographics ==
=== Population ===
At the time of the 2006 National Census, the city's population was 7,119 in 1,588 households. The following census in 2011 counted 7,859 people in 1,935 households. The 2016 census measured the population of the city as 8,248 people in 2,341 households.
