= Sar Bast, Sepidan =

Sar Bast سربست
- Village
- Location within Iran
- Coordinates: 30°10′38″N 52°02′57″E
- Country: Iran
- Province: Fars
- County: Sepidan
- Bakhsh: Hamaijan
- Rural District: Hamaijan

Population (2006)
  - Total: 789
- Time zone: UTC+3:30 (IRST)
  - Summer (DST): UTC+4:30 (IRDT)

Sar Bast (Persian: سربست; also known as Qal‘eh-ye Bāsakūn and Sar Bas) is a village in Hamaijan Rural District, Hamaijan District, Sepidan County, Fars province, Iran. At the 2006 census, its population was 789, in 197 families.
