= Sadabad, Ilam =

Sadabad سعداباد
- Village
- Location within Iran
- Coordinates: 33°40′35″N 46°43′52″E
- Country: Iran
- Province: Ilam
- County: Chardavol
- Bakhsh: Zagros
- Rural District: Bijnavand

Population (2006)
  - Total: 133
- Time zone: UTC+3:30 (IRST)
  - Summer (DST): UTC+4:30 (IRDT)

Sadabad (Persian: سعداباد, also Romanized as Sa‘dābād) is a village in Bijnavand Rural District, in the Zagros District of Chardavol County, Ilam Province, Iran. At the 2006 census, its population was 133, in 31 families. The village is populated by Kurds.
