= Gombakan =

Gombakan گمبكان
- Village
- Location within Iran
- Coordinates: 30°04′57″N 53°14′33″E
- Country: Iran
- Province: Fars
- County: Pasargad
- Bakhsh: Central
- Rural District: Sarpaniran

Population (2006)
  - Total: 470
- Time zone: UTC+3:30 (IRST)
  - Summer (DST): UTC+4:30 (IRDT)

Gombakan (Persian: گمبكان, also Romanized as Gombakān, Gombekān, and Gambakān; also known as Golmakān, and Komyān) is a village in Sarpaniran Rural District, in the Central District of Pasargad County, Fars province, Iran. At the 2006 census, its population was 470, in 123 families.
