= Sadabad, Bijar =

Sadabad سعد آباد
- Village
- Location within Iran
- Coordinates: 35°50′31″N 47°29′34″E
- Country: Iran
- Province: Kurdistan
- County: Bijar
- Bakhsh: Central
- Rural District: Howmeh

Population (2006)
  - Total: 19
- Time zone: UTC+3:30 (IRST)
  - Summer (DST): UTC+4:30 (IRDT)

Sadabad (Persian: سعد آباد, also Romanized as Sa‘dābād; also known as Tapleh and Tappeh) is a village in Howmeh Rural District, in the Central District of Bijar County, Kurdistan Province, Iran. At the 2006 census, its population was 19, in 5 families. The village is populated by Kurds.
