= Ab Mahi, Kohgiluyeh and Boyer-Ahmad =

Ab Mahi اب ماهي
- Village
- Location within Iran
- Coordinates: 30°53′44″N 50°47′07″E
- Country: Iran
- Province: Kohgiluyeh and Boyer-Ahmad
- County: Charam
- Bakhsh: Sarfaryab
- Rural District: Poshteh-ye Zilayi

Population (2006)
  - Total: 335
- Time zone: UTC+3:30 (IRST)
  - Summer (DST): UTC+4:30 (IRDT)

Ab Mahi (Persian: اب ماهي, also Romanized as Āb Māhī and Āb-e Māhi) is a village in Poshteh-ye Zilayi Rural District, Sarfaryab District, Charam County, Kohgiluyeh and Boyer-Ahmad province, Iran. At the 2006 census, its population was 335, in 58 families.
