= Bidgol, Kermanshah =

Bidgol بيدگل
- Village
- Location within Iran
- Coordinates: 34°18′33″N 46°36′44″E
- Country: Iran
- Province: Kermanshah
- County: Kermanshah
- Bakhsh: Kuzaran
- Rural District: Haft Ashiyan

Population (2006)
  - Total: 153
- Time zone: UTC+3:30 (IRST)
  - Summer (DST): UTC+4:30 (IRDT)

Bidgol (Persian: بيدگل, also Romanized as Bīdgol and Bīd Gol; also known as Bēdgūl and Bīdgol-e Soflá) is a village in Haft Ashiyan Rural District, Kuzaran District, Kermanshah County, Kermanshah Province, Iran. At the 2006 census, its population was 153, in 30 families.
