= Garmeh, Fariman =

Garmeh گرمه
- Village
- Location within Iran
- Coordinates: 35°44′29″N 59°39′31″E
- Country: Iran
- Province: Razavi Khorasan
- County: Fariman
- Bakhsh: Central
- Rural District: Fariman

Population (2006)
  - Total: 111
- Time zone: UTC+3:30 (IRST)
  - Summer (DST): UTC+4:30 (IRDT)

Garmeh (Persian: گرمه) is a village in Fariman Rural District, in the Central District of Fariman County, Razavi Khorasan Province, Iran. At the 2006 census, its population was 111, in 32 families.
