= Shah Mansuri, Hormozgan =

Shah Mansuri شاه منصوري
- Village
- Location within Iran
- Coordinates: 27°09′34″N 57°01′03″E
- Country: Iran
- Province: Hormozgan
- County: Minab
- Bakhsh: Central
- Rural District: Howmeh

Population (2006)
  - Total: 733
- Time zone: UTC+3:30 (IRST)
  - Summer (DST): UTC+4:30 (IRDT)

Shah Mansuri (Persian: شاه منصوري, also Romanized as Shāh Manşūrī and Shah Mansoori) is a village in Howmeh Rural District, in the Central District of Minab County, Hormozgan Province, Iran. At the 2006 census, its population was 733, in 150 families.
