= Shul, Mohr =

Shul شول
- Village
- Location within Iran
- Coordinates: 27°35′12″N 52°47′01″E
- Country: Iran
- Province: Fars
- County: Mohr
- Bakhsh: Central
- Rural District: Arudan

Population (2006)
  - Total: 462
- Time zone: UTC+3:30 (IRST)
  - Summer (DST): UTC+4:30 (IRDT)

Shul (Persian: شول, also Romanized as Shūl) is a village in Arudan Rural District, in the Central District of Mohr County, Fars province, Iran. At the 2006 census, its population was 462, in 89 families.
