= Sadabad, Anbarabad =

Sadabad سعداباد
- Village
- Location within Iran
- Coordinates: 28°20′46″N 57°58′53″E
- Country: Iran
- Province: Kerman
- County: Anbarabad
- Bakhsh: Jebalbarez-e Jonubi
- Rural District: Mardehek

Population (2006)
  - Total: 1,294
- Time zone: UTC+3:30 (IRST)
  - Summer (DST): UTC+4:30 (IRDT)

Sadabad (Persian: سعداباد, also Romanized as Sa‘dābād) is a village in Mardehek Rural District, Jebalbarez-e Jonubi District, Anbarabad County, Kerman Province, Iran. At the 2006 census, its population was 1,294, in 265 families.
