= Sahlabad, East Azerbaijan =

Sahlabad سهل اباد
- Village
- Location within Iran
- Coordinates: 37°23′15″N 48°07′36″E
- Country: Iran
- Province: East Azerbaijan
- County: Meyaneh
- Bakhsh: Kaghazkonan
- Rural District: Kaghazkonan-e Shomali

Population (2006)
  - Total: 107
- Time zone: UTC+3:30 (IRST)
  - Summer (DST): UTC+4:30 (IRDT)

Sahlabad (Persian: سهل اباد, also Romanized as Sahlābād) is a village in Kaghazkonan-e Shomali Rural District, Kaghazkonan District, Meyaneh County, East Azerbaijan Province, Iran. In the 2006 census, its population was 107 people across 41 families.
