= Aliabad-e Jowhari =

Aliabad-e Jowhari علي اباد جوهرئ
- Village
- Location within Iran
- Coordinates: 27°21′49″N 53°07′51″E
- Country: Iran
- Province: Fars
- County: Lamerd
- Bakhsh: Central
- Rural District: Howmeh

Population (2006)
  - Total: 61
- Time zone: UTC+3:30 (IRST)
  - Summer (DST): UTC+4:30 (IRDT)

Aliabad-e Jowhari (Persian: علي اباد جوهرئ, also Romanized as 'Alīābād-e Jowharī; also known as Sa‘dābād) is a village in Howmeh Rural District, in the Central District of Lamerd County, Fars province, Iran. At the 2006 census, its population was 61, in 13 families.
