= Garmeh Khush =

Garmeh Khush گرمه خوش
- Village
- Location within Iran
- Coordinates: 37°08′54″N 57°20′37″E
- Country: Iran
- Province: North Khorasan
- County: Esfarayen
- Bakhsh: Central
- Rural District: Ruin

Population (2006)
  - Total: 460
- Time zone: UTC+3:30 (IRST)
  - Summer (DST): UTC+4:30 (IRDT)

Garmeh Khush (Persian: گرمه خوش, also Romanized as Garmeh Khūsh; also known as Garmeh) is a village in Ruin Rural District, in the Central District of Esfarayen County, North Khorasan Province, Iran. At the 2006 census, its population was 460, in 93 families.
