= Sadabad-e Sofla =

Sadabad-e Sofla سعدابادسفلي
- Village
- Location within Iran
- Coordinates: 29°24′37″N 57°51′44″E
- Country: Iran
- Province: Kerman
- County: Bam
- Bakhsh: Central
- Rural District: Howmeh

Population (2006)
  - Total: 27
- Time zone: UTC+3:30 (IRST)
  - Summer (DST): UTC+4:30 (IRDT)

Sadabad-e Sofla (Persian: سعدابادسفلي, also Romanized as Sa‘dābād-e Soflá; also known as Sa‘dābād) is a village in Howmeh Rural District, in the Central District of Bam County, Kerman Province, Iran. At the 2006 census, its population was 27, in 10 families.
