= Garmeh, Mashhad =

Garmeh گرمه
- Village
- Location within Iran
- Coordinates: 36°30′49″N 59°27′54″E
- Country: Iran
- Province: Razavi Khorasan
- County: Mashhad
- Bakhsh: Central
- Rural District: Darzab

Population (2006)
  - Total: 164
- Time zone: UTC+3:30 (IRST)
  - Summer (DST): UTC+4:30 (IRDT)

Garmeh (Persian: گرمه) is a village in Darzab Rural District, in the Central District of Mashhad County, Razavi Khorasan Province, Iran. At the 2006 census, its population was 164, in 40 families.
