= Nezamabad, Shazand =

Nezamabad نظام اباد
- Village
- Location within Iran
- Coordinates: 33°39′50″N 49°16′55″E
- Country: Iran
- Province: Markazi
- County: Shazand
- Bakhsh: Sarband
- Rural District: Hendudar

Population (2006)
  - Total: 35
- Time zone: UTC+3:30 (IRST)
  - Summer (DST): UTC+4:30 (IRDT)

Nezamabad (Persian: نظام اباد, also Romanized as Nez̧āmābād; also known as Dozd-e Lag, Ḩeşāmābād, and Hez̧āmābād) is a village in Hendudar Rural District, Sarband District, Shazand County, Markazi Province, Iran. At the 2006 census, its population was 35, in 5 families.
