= Dalkhan =

Dalkhan دلخان
- Village
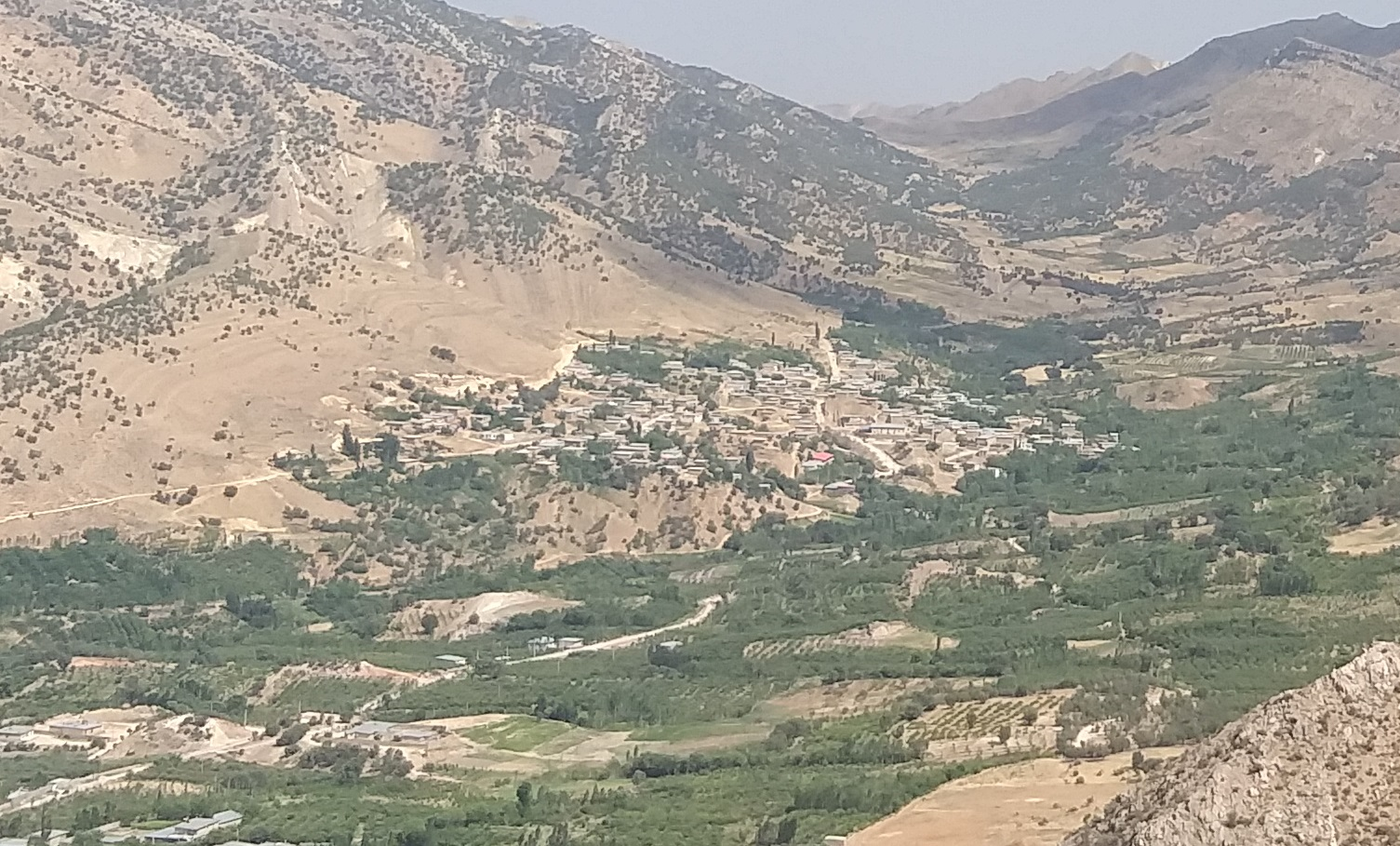

- Location within Iran
- Coordinates: 30°14′39″N 52°06′17″E
- Country: Iran
- Province: Fars
- County: Sepidan
- Bakhsh: Hamaijan
- Rural District: Shesh Pir

Population (2006)
  - Total: 1,231
- Time zone: UTC+3:30 (IRST)
  - Summer (DST): UTC+4:30 (IRDT)

Dalkhan (Persian: دلخان, also Romanized as Dalkhān; also known as Shūl-e Dalkhān and Talakhān) is a village in Shesh Pir Rural District, Hamaijan District, Sepidan County, Fars province, Iran. At the 2006 census, its population was 1,231, in 233 families.
