= Zirrah Amirqoli =

Zirrah Amirqoli زيرراه اميرقلي
- Village
- Location within Iran
- Coordinates: 33°03′52″N 49°00′51″E
- Country: Iran
- Province: Lorestan
- County: Aligudarz
- Bakhsh: Zaz and Mahru
- Rural District: Mahru

Population (2006)
  - Total: 75
- Time zone: UTC+3:30 (IRST)
  - Summer (DST): UTC+4:30 (IRDT)

Zirrah Amirqoli (Persian: زيرراه اميرقلي, also Romanized as Zīrrāh Āmīrqolī) is a village in Mahru Rural District, Zaz and Mahru District, Aligudarz County, Lorestan Province, Iran. At the 2006 census, its population was 75, in 12 families.
