= Harmidul =

Harmidul هرميدول
- Village
- Location within Iran
- Coordinates: 35°52′48″N 46°12′03″E
- Country: Iran
- Province: Kurdistan
- County: Saqqez
- Bakhsh: Sarshiv
- Rural District: Zu ol Faqr

Population (2006)
  - Total: 220
- Time zone: UTC+3:30 (IRST)
  - Summer (DST): UTC+4:30 (IRDT)

Harmidul (Persian: هرميدول, also Romanized as Harmīdūl; also known as Garmadol, Garmeh-ye Dūl, Harmedal, Harmedol, and Harmeh Dūl) is a village in Zu ol Faqr Rural District, Sarshiv District, Saqqez County, Kurdistan Province, Iran. At the 2006 census, its population was 220, in 42 families. The village is populated by Kurds.
