= Sahlabad, Nishapur =

Sahlabad سهل اباد
- Village
- Location within Iran
- Coordinates: 36°16′26″N 58°42′11″E
- Country: Iran
- Province: Razavi Khorasan
- County: Nishapur
- Bakhsh: Central
- Rural District: Mazul

Population (2006)
  - Total: 237
- Time zone: UTC+3:30 (IRST)
  - Summer (DST): UTC+4:30 (IRDT)

Sahlabad (Persian: سهل اباد, also Romanized as Sahlābād; also known as Şāleḩābād and Sālihābād) is a village in Mazul Rural District, in the Central District of Nishapur County, Razavi Khorasan Province, Iran. At the 2006 census, its population was 237, in 67 families.
