= Palangi, Hormozgan =

Palangi پلنگي
- Village
- Location within Iran
- Coordinates: 26°50′28″N 57°13′54″E
- Country: Iran
- Province: Hormozgan
- County: Minab
- Bakhsh: Central
- Rural District: Karian

Population (2006)
  - Total: 217
- Time zone: UTC+3:30 (IRST)
  - Summer (DST): UTC+4:30 (IRDT)

Palangi (Persian: پلنگي, also Romanized as Palangī) is a village in Karian Rural District, in the Central District of Minab County, Hormozgan Province, Iran. At the 2006 census, its population was 217, in 42 families.
