= Seyyed Mansur =

Seyyed Mansur سيدمنصور
- Village
- Location within Iran
- Coordinates: 37°47′47″N 47°55′04″E
- Country: Iran
- Province: East Azerbaijan
- County: Meyaneh
- Bakhsh: Kandovan
- Rural District: Garmeh-ye Shomali

Population (2006)
  - Total: 188
- Time zone: UTC+3:30 (IRST)
  - Summer (DST): UTC+4:30 (IRDT)

Seyyed Mansur (Persian: سيدمنصور, also Romanized as Seyyed Manşūr; also known as Seyah Manşūr and Shāh Manşūr) is a village in Garmeh-ye Shomali Rural District, Kandovan District, Meyaneh County, East Azerbaijan Province, Iran. At the 2006 census, its population was 188, in 42 families.
