= Kamfiruz-e Shomali District =

District in Fars province, Iran

Kamfiruz-e Shomali District Persian: بخش کامفیروز شمالی
- District
- Location within Iran
- Coordinates: 30°24′38″N 52°11′25″E
- Country: Iran
- Province: Fars
- County: Marvdasht
- Capital: Khaniman

Population (2016)
  - Total: 11,396
- Time zone: UTC+3:30 (IRST)

Kamfiruz-e Shomali District (Persian: بخش کامفیروز شمالی) (Note: Formerly Kor District (بخش کر)) is in Marvdasht County, Fars province, Iran. Its capital is the city of Khaniman.

== History ==
In 2010, Kamfiruz-e Shomali Rural District was separated from Kamfiruz District in the formation of Kor District. (Note: Renamed Kamfiruz-e Shomali District) After the 2011 National Census, the village of Khaniman was elevated to the status of a city.

== Demographics ==
=== Population ===
At the time of the 2011 census, the district's population was 11,383 people in 3,163 households. The 2016 census measured the population of the district as 11,396 inhabitants in 3,446 households.

=== Administrative divisions ===
Kamfiruz-e Shomali District Population
Administrative Divisions	2011	2016
Garmeh RD	8,771	5,591
Kamfiruz-e Shomali RD	2,612	2,785
Khaniman (city)		3,020
Total	11,383	11,396
RD = Rural District
