= Dorudzan Rural District =

Rural district in Fars province, Iran

Dorudzan Rural District Persian: دهستان درودزن
- Rural District
- Location within Iran
- Coordinates: 30°16′15″N 52°24′53″E
- Country: Iran
- Province: Fars
- County: Marvdasht
- District: Dorudzan
- Capital: Dorudzan

Population (2016)
  - Total: 11,449
- Time zone: UTC+3:30 (IRST)

Dorudzan Rural District (Persian: دهستان درودزن) is in Dorudzan District of Marvdasht County, Fars province, Iran. Its capital is the village of Dorudzan.

== Demographics ==
=== Population ===
At the time of the 2006 National Census, the rural district's population was 11,470 in 2,683 households. There were 10,977 inhabitants in 2,973 households at the following census of 2011. The 2016 census measured the population of the rural district as 11,449 in 3,333 households. The most populous of its 25 villages was Shahrak-e Abraj, with 2,880 people.
