= Kamfiruz-e Jonubi Rural District =

Rural district in Fars province, Iran

Kamfiruz-e Jonubi Rural District Persian: دهستان كامفيروز جنوبي
- Rural District
- Location within Iran
- Coordinates: 30°20′11″N 52°11′52″E
- Country: Iran
- Province: Fars
- County: Marvdasht
- District: Kamfiruz
- Capital: Kamfiruz

Population (2016)
  - Total: 7,643
- Time zone: UTC+3:30 (IRST)

Kamfiruz-e Jonubi Rural District (Persian: دهستان كامفيروز جنوبي) is in Kamfiruz District of Marvdasht County, Fars province, Iran. It is administered from the city of Kamfiruz.

== Demographics ==
=== Population ===
At the time of the 2006 National Census, the rural district's population was 7,377 in 1,568 households. There were 7,076 inhabitants in 1,825 households at the following census of 2011. The 2016 census measured the population of the rural district as 7,643 in 2,146 households. The most populous of its 14 villages was Mahjanabad, with 2,112 people.
