= Khorram Makan Rural District =

Rural district in Fars province, Iran

Khorram Makan Rural District Persian: دهستان خرم مكان
- Rural District
- Location within Iran
- Coordinates: 30°13′41″N 52°14′45″E
- Country: Iran
- Province: Fars
- County: Marvdasht
- District: Kamfiruz
- Capital: Khorram Makan

Population (2016)
  - Total: 8,542
- Time zone: UTC+3:30 (IRST)

Khorram Makan Rural District (Persian: دهستان خرم مكان) is in Kamfiruz District of Marvdasht County, Fars province, Iran. Its capital is the village of Khorram Makan.

== Demographics ==
=== Population ===
At the time of the 2006 National Census, the rural district's population was 8,766 in 1,716 households. There were 8,432 inhabitants in 2,035 households at the following census of 2011. The 2016 census measured the population of the rural district as 8,542 in 2,147 households. The most populous of its 19 villages was Abbad, with 1,385 people.
