= Abarj Rural District =

Rural district in Fars province, Iran

Abarj Rural District Persian: دهستان ابرج
- Rural District
- Location within Iran
- Coordinates: 30°10′05″N 52°41′01″E
- Country: Iran
- Province: Fars
- County: Marvdasht
- District: Dorudzan
- Capital: Bid Gol

Population (2016)
  - Total: 11,705
- Time zone: UTC+3:30 (IRST)

Abarj Rural District (Persian: دهستان ابرج) is in Dorudzan District of Marvdasht County, Fars province, Iran. Its capital is the village of Bid Gol.

== Demographics ==
=== Population ===
At the time of the 2006 National Census, the rural district's population was 11,904 in 2,574 households. There were 11,720 inhabitants in 2,977 households at the following census of 2011. The 2016 census measured the population of the rural district as 11,705 in 3,282 households. The most populous of its 40 villages was Darreh Bad, with 1,575 people.
