= Ramjerd-e Do Rural District =

Rural district in Fars province, Iran

Ramjerd-e Do Rural District Persian: دهستان رامجرد دو
- Rural District
- Location within Iran
- Coordinates: 30°02′49″N 52°35′15″E
- Country: Iran
- Province: Fars
- County: Marvdasht
- District: Dorudzan
- Capital: Ramjerd

Population (2016)
  - Total: 12,122
- Time zone: UTC+3:30 (IRST)

Ramjerd-e Do Rural District (Persian: دهستان رامجرد دو) is in Dorudzan District of Marvdasht County, Fars province, Iran. It is administered from the city of Ramjerd. (Note: Formerly the village of Kushkak)

== Demographics ==
=== Population ===
At the time of the 2006 National Census, the rural district's population was 15,427 in 3,610 households. There were 12,922 inhabitants in 3,444 households at the following census of 2011. The 2016 census measured the population of the rural district as 12,122 in 3,616 households. The most populous of its 56 villages was Chamani, with 1,037 people.
