= Kamfiruz-e Shomali Rural District =

Rural district in Fars province, Iran

Kamfiruz-e Shomali Rural District Persian: دهستان كامفيروز شمالي
- Rural District
- Location within Iran
- Coordinates: 30°30′15″N 52°06′09″E
- Country: Iran
- Province: Fars
- County: Marvdasht
- District: Kamfiruz-e Shomali
- Capital: Khaniman

Population (2016)
  - Total: 2,785
- Time zone: UTC+3:30 (IRST)

Kamfiruz-e Shomali Rural District (Persian: دهستان كامفيروز شمالي) is in Kamfiruz-e Shomali District (Note: Formerly Kor District) of Marvdasht County, Fars province, Iran. It is administered from the city of Khaniman.

== Demographics ==
=== Population ===
At the time of the 2006 National Census, the rural district's population (as a part of Kamfiruz District) was 12,668 in 2,945 households. There were 2,612 inhabitants in 674 households at the following census of 2011, by which time the rural district had been separated from the district in the formation of Kor District. (Note: Renamed Kamfiruz-e Shomali District) The 2016 census measured the population of the rural district as 2,785 in 854 households. The most populous of its 10 villages was Garmeh, with 733 people.
