= Sadabad District =

District in Bushehr province, Iran

Sadabad District Persian: بخش سعدآباد
- District
- Location within Iran
- Coordinates: 29°33′N 51°10′E
- Country: Iran
- Province: Bushehr
- County: Dashtestan
- Capital: Sadabad

Population (2016)
  - Total: 33,513
- Time zone: UTC+3:30 (IRST)

Sadabad District (Persian: بخش سعدآباد) is in Dashtestan County, Bushehr province, Iran. Its capital is the city of Sadabad.

== Demographics ==
=== Population ===
At the time of the 2006 National Census, the district's population was 31,928 in 6,772 households. The following census in 2011 counted 33,272 people in 8,389 households. The 2016 census measured the population of the district as 33,513 inhabitants living in 9,568 households.

=== Administrative divisions ===
Sadabad District Population
Administrative Divisions	2006	2011	2016
Vahdatiyeh RD	2,120	1,717	1,724
Zirrah RD	11,666	12,282	12,319
Sadabad (city)	7,119	7,859	8,248
Vahdatiyeh (city)	11,023	11,414	11,222
Total	31,928	33,272	33,513
RD = Rural District
