= Dorudzan District =

District in Fars province, Iran

Dorudzan District Persian: بخش درودزن
- District
- Location within Iran
- Coordinates: 30°10′08″N 52°33′44″E
- Country: Iran
- Province: Fars
- County: Marvdasht
- Capital: Ramjerd

Population (2016)
  - Total: 37,826
- Time zone: UTC+3:30 (IRST)

Dorudzan District (Persian: بخش درودزن) is in Marvdasht County, Fars province, Iran. Its capital is the city of Ramjerd. (Note: Formerly the village of Kushkak)

== History ==
After the 2006 National Census, the village of Kushkak was elevated to city status as Ramjerd.

== Demographics ==
=== Population ===
At the time of the 2006 census, the district's population was 38,801 in 8,867 households. The following census in 2011 counted 37,879 people in 9,960 households. The 2016 census measured the population of the district as 37,826 inhabitants in 10,944 households.

=== Administrative divisions ===
Dorudzan District Population
Administrative Divisions	2006	2011	2016
Abarj RD	11,904	11,720	11,705
Dorudzan RD	11,470	10,977	11,449
Ramjerd-e Do RD	15,427	12,922	12,122
Ramjerd (city)		2,260	2,550
Total	38,801	37,879	37,826
RD = Rural District
