= Kamfiruz District =

District in Fars province, Iran

Kamfiruz District Persian: بخش کامفیروز
- District
- Location within Iran
- Coordinates: 30°16′49″N 52°15′07″E
- Country: Iran
- Province: Fars
- County: Marvdasht
- Capital: Kamfiruz

Population (2016)
  - Total: 19,898
- Time zone: UTC+3:30 (IRST)

Kamfiruz District (Persian: بخش کامفیروز) is in Marvdasht County, Fars province, Iran. Its capital is the city of Kamfiruz.

== History ==
After the 2006 National Census, time Kamfiruz-e Shomali Rural District was separated from the district in the formation of Kor District. (Note: Renamed Kamfiruz-e Shomali District)

== Demographics ==
=== Population ===
At the time of the 2006 census, the district's population was 31,341 in 6,774 households. The following census in 2011 counted 18,006 people in 4,519 households. The 2016 census measured the population of the district as 19,898 inhabitants in 5,350 households.

=== Administrative divisions ===
Kamfiruz District Population
Administrative Divisions	2006	2011	2016
Kamfiruz-e Jonubi RD	7,377	7,076	7,643
Kamfiruz-e Shomali RD (Note: Transferred to Kor District, renamed Kamfiruz-e Shomali District)	12,668		
Khorram Makan RD	8,766	8,432	8,542
Kamfiruz (city)	2,530	2,498	3,713
Total	31,341	18,006	19,898
RD = Rural District
