= Marvdasht County =

County in Fars province, Iran

Marvdasht County Persian: شهرستان مرودشت
- County
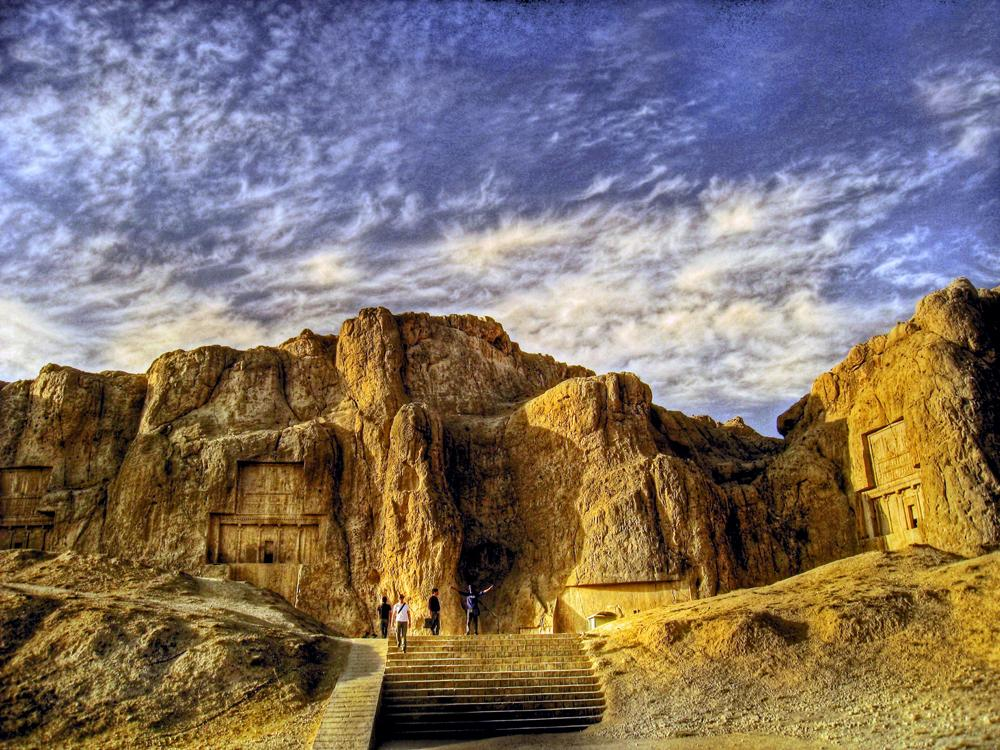
- Naqshe Rostam

- Location of Marvdasht County in Fars province (top center, pink)

- Location of Fars province in Iran
- Coordinates: 30°12′N 52°37′E
- Country: Iran
- Province: Fars
- Capital: Marvdasht
- Districts: Central, Dorudzan, Kamfiruz, Kamfiruz-e Shomali, Seyyedan

Area
  - Total: 3,687 km^{2} (1,424 sq mi)

Population (2016)
  - Total: 323,434
  - Density: 87.72/km^{2} (227.2/sq mi)
- Time zone: UTC+3:30 (IRST)

Marvdasht County (Persian: شهرستان مرودشت) is in Fars province, Iran. Its capital is the city of Marvdasht.

== History ==
After the 2006 National Census, the village of Kushkak rose to city status as Ramjerd. Kamfiruz-e Shomali Rural District was separated from Kamfiruz District in the formation of Kor District, (Note: Renamed Kamfiruz-e Shomali District) which was divided into two rural districts, including the new Garmeh Rural District.

After the 2011 census, the village of Khaniman was elevated to the status of a city. After the 2016 census, the villages of Faruq, Fathabad, and Zangiabad became cities.

== Demographics ==
=== Population ===
At the time of the 2006 census, the county's population was 294,621 in 69,244 households. The following census in 2011 counted 307,492 people in 83,641 households. The 2016 census measured the population of the county as 323,434 in 94,699 households.

=== Administrative divisions ===
Marvdasht County's population history and administrative structure over three consecutive censuses are shown in the following table.

Marvdasht County Population
Administrative Divisions	2006	2011	2016
Central District	195,450	210,514	221,163
Kenareh RD	20,024	20,275	19,815
Majdabad RD	8,055	7,875	8,410
Mohammadabad RD	8,758	8,663	9,515
Naqsh-e Rostam RD	13,737	14,473	14,195
Ramjerd-e Yek RD	10,138	9,904	9,994
Rudbal RD	10,880	10,675	10,376
Fathabad (city) (Note: Became a city after the 2016 census)			
Marvdasht (city)	123,858	138,649	148,858
Zangiabad (city) (Note: Became a city after the 2016 census)			
Dorudzan District	38,801	37,879	37,826
Abarj RD	11,904	11,720	11,705
Dorudzan RD	11,470	10,977	11,449
Ramjerd-e Do RD	15,427	12,922	12,122
Ramjerd (city)		2,260	2,550
Kamfiruz District	31,341	18,006	19,898
Kamfiruz-e Jonubi RD	7,377	7,076	7,643
Kamfiruz-e Shomali RD	12,668		
Khorram Makan RD	8,766	8,432	8,542
Kamfiruz (city)	2,530	2,498	3,713
Kamfiruz-e Shomali District (Note: Formerly Kor District)		11,383	11,396
Garmeh RD		8,771	5,591
Kamfiruz-e Shomali RD		2,612	2,785
Khaniman (city)			3,020
Seyyedan District	29,029	28,916	32,850
Khafrak-e Olya RD	9,987	9,974	11,310
Rahmat RD	11,487	11,379	12,966
Faruq (city) (Note: Became a city after the 2016 census)			
Seyyedan (city)	7,555	7,563	8,574
Total	294,621	307,492	323,434
RD = Rural District

== See also ==
Media related to Marvdasht County at Wikimedia Commons
