= Dowlatabad =

Dowlatabad (Persian: دولت اباد) may refer to:

== Afghanistan ==
- Dowlatabad, Balkh

== Iran ==
=== Alborz Province ===
- Dowlatabad, Alborz

=== Ardabil Province ===
- Dowlatabad, Kowsar, a village in Kowsar County
- Dowlatabad, Meshgin Shahr, a village in Meshgin Shahr County
- Dowlatabad, Namin, a village in Namin County
- Dowlatabad Rural District (Namin County)

=== Bushehr Province ===
- Dowlatabad, Bushehr

=== East Azerbaijan Province ===
- Dowlatabad, Heris, a village in Heris County
- Dowlatabad, Marand, a village in Marand County
- Dowlatabad, Sarab, a village in Sarab County
- Dowlatabad Rural District (Marand County)

=== Fars Province ===
- Dowlatabad, Darab, a village in Darab County
- Dowlatabad, Farashband, a village in Farashband County
- Dowlatabad, Now Bandegan, a village in Fasa County
- Dowlatabad, Sheshdeh and Qarah Bulaq, a village in Fasa County
- Dowlatabad-e Dasht-e Seh Chah, a village in Fasa County
- Dowlatabad, Firuzabad, a village in Firuzabad County
- Dowlatabad, Jahrom, a village in Jahrom County
- Dowlatabad, Kavar, a village in Kavar County
- Dowlatabad, Lamerd, a village in Lamerd County
- Dowlatabad, Larestan, a village in Larestan County
- Dowlatabad-e Qadim-e Yek, a village in Larestan County
- Dowlatabad, Mamasani, a village in Mamasani County
- Dowlatabad, Kenareh, a village in Marvdasht County
- Dowlatabad, Ramjerd-e Yek, a village in Marvdasht County
- Dowlatabad, Neyriz, a village in Neyriz County
- Dowlatabad, Pasargad, a village in Pasargad County
- Dowlatabad, Sarvestan, a village in Sarvestan County
- Dowlatabad, Kuhenjan, a village in Sarvestan County
- Dowlatabad, Sepidan, a village in Sepidan County
- Dowlatabad, Beyza, a village in Sepidan County
- Dowlatabad, Shiraz, a village in Shiraz County
- Dowlatabad, Bid Zard, a village in Shiraz County

=== Hamadan Province ===
- Dowlatabad, former name of Malayer
- Dowlatabad, Asadabad, a village in Asadabad County
- Dowlatabad, Bahar, a village in Bahar County
- Dowlatabad, Hamadan, a village in Bahar County
- Dowlatabad, Kabudarahang, a village in Kabudarahang County
- Dowlatabad, Nahavand, a village in Nahavand County

=== Ilam Province ===
- Dowlatabad, Ilam, a village in Eyvan County

=== Isfahan Province ===
- Dowlatabad, Ardestan, a village in Ardestan County
- Dowlatabad, Isfahan, a city in Borkhar County
- Dowlatabad, Chadegan, a village in Chadegan County
- Dowlatabad-e Gol Sefid, a village in Chadegan County
- Dowlatabad, Dehaqan, a village in Dehaqan County
- Dowlatabad, Kuhpayeh, a village in Isfahan County
- Dowlatabad, Kashan, a village in Kashan County
- Dowlatabad, Nain, a village in Nain County
- Dowlatabad, Lay Siyah, a village in Nain County
- Dowlatabad, Tiran and Karvan, a village in Tiran and Karvan County

=== Kerman Province ===
- Dowlatabad, Anbarabad, a village in Anbarabad County
- Dowlatabad, Arzuiyeh, a village in Arzuiyeh County
- Dowlatabad 3, a village in Baft County
- Dowlatabad, Negar, a village in Bardsir County
- Dowlatabad, Fahraj, a village in Fahraj County
- Dowlatabad, Jiroft, a village in Jiroft County
- Dowlatabad, Esfandaqeh, a village in Jiroft Country
- Dowlatabad, Sarduiyeh, a village in Jiroft County
- Dowlatabad, Kerman, a village in Kerman County
- Dowlatabad, Shahdad, a village in Kerman County
- Dowlatabad, Narmashir, a village in Narmashir County
- Dowlatabad-e Ansari, a village in Narmashir County
- Dowlatabad, Rafsanjan, a village in Rafsanjan County
- Dowlatabad, Ferdows, a village in Rafsanjan County
- Dowlatabad, Rigan, a village in Rigan County
- Dowlatabad, Shahr-e Babak, a village in Shahr-e Babak County
- Dowlatabad, Sirjan, a village in Sirjan County
- Dowlatabad, Sharifabad, a village in Sirjan County
- Dowlatabad, Zarand, a village in Zarand County
- Dowlatabad Rural District (Kerman Province), in Jiroft County

=== Kermanshah Province ===
- Dowlatabad-e Olya, a village in Kermanshah County
- Dowlatabad-e Sofla, a village in Kermanshah County
- Dowlatabad, Ravansar, a village in Ravansar County
- Dowlatabad Rural District (Kermanshah Province), in Ravansar County
- Dowlatabad, Sahneh, a village in Sahneh County

=== Khuzestan Province ===
- Dowlatabad, Behbahan, a village in Behbahan County
- Dowlatabad, Hoveyzeh, a village in Hoveyzeh County
- Dowlatabad, Shushtar, a village in Shushtar County

=== Kohgiluyeh and Boyer-Ahmad Province ===
- Dowlatabad, Kohgiluyeh and Boyer-Ahmad, a village in Boyer-Ahmad County

=== Kurdistan Province ===
- Dowlatabad, Bijar, a village in Bijar County
- Dowlatabad, Sanandaj, a village in Sanandaj County
- Dowlatabad, Saqqez, a village in Saqqez County

=== Lorestan Province ===
- Dowlatabad, Azna, a village in Azna County
- Dowlatabad, Khorramabad, a village in Khorramabad County

=== Markazi Province ===
- Dowlatabad, Farahan, a village in Farahan County
- Dowlatabad, Saveh, a village in Saveh County

=== Mazandaran Province ===
- Dowlatabad, Mazandaran, a village in Sari County

=== North Khorasan Province ===
- Dowlatabad, North Khorasan

=== Qazvin Province ===
- Dowlatabad, Qazvin

=== Qom Province ===
- Dowlatabad-e Aqa
- Dowlatabad (34°42′ N 50°27′ E), Jafarabad
- Dowlatabad (34°49′ N 50°35′ E), Jafarabad
- Dowlatabad, Salafchegan

=== Razavi Khorasan Province ===
- Dowlatabad, Razavi Khorasan, a city in Zave County
- Dowlatabad, Chenaran, a village in Chenaran County
- Dowlatabad, Dargaz, a village in Dargaz County
- Dowlatabad, Fariman, a village in Fariman County
- Dowlatabad, Firuzeh, a village in Firuzeh County
- Dowlatabad, Nishapur, a village in Nishapur County
- Dowlatabad, Zeberkhan, a village in Nishapur County
- Dowlatabad, Rashtkhvar, a village in Rashtkhvar County
- Dowlatabad, Sabzevar, a village in Sabzevar County
- Dowlatabad, Sarakhs, a village in Sarakhs County
- Dowlatabad, Torbat-e Jam, a village in Torbat-e Jam County

=== Semnan Province ===
- Dowlatabad, Aradan, a village in Aradan County
- Dowlatabad, Damghan, a village in Damghan County
- Dowlatabad, Shahrud, a village in Shahrud County

=== Sistan and Baluchestan Province ===
- Dowlatabad, Hirmand, a village in Hirmand County

=== South Khorasan Province ===
- Dowlatabad, Jolgeh-e Mazhan, a village in Khusf County
- Dowlatabad, Tabas, a village in Tabas County

=== Tehran Province ===
- Dowlatabad, Tehran
- Dowlatabad, Varamin
- Dowlatabad-e Qeysariyeh

=== West Azerbaijan Province ===
- Dowlatabad, Bukan, a village in Bukan County
- Dowlatabad, Miandoab, a village in Miandoab County

=== Yazd Province ===
- Dowlatabad, Bafq, a village in Bafq County
- Dowlatabad-e Amanat, a village in Yazd County

=== Zanjan Province ===
- Dowlatabad, Zanjan, a village in Abhar County
- Dowlatabad Rural District (Abhar County)

== See also ==
- Dowlatabad Rural District (disambiguation)
- Dowlatabadi, several people
- Doulatabad (disambiguation)
