= List of members in the Sixth Term of the Assembly of Experts =

The List of members from the sixth term of the Assembly of Experts. (Persian: فهرست نمایندگان دوره ششم مجلس خبرگان رهبری, romanized: Fehreste nâmâyandegân dore shishom majles-e khobregân-e rahbari) consists of names of the members during the sixth term of the Assembly of Experts from 21 May 2024 until 2032. Elections for the Assembly of Experts occurs every 8 years. However, for the fourth term it was 10 years because the elections that took place for the fifth term was planned for 2014 but was postponed to 2016 in order to be held alongside the 2016 Iranian legislative election.

"Assembly of experts (of the Leadership)", or the "Council of Experts" is the deliberative body empowered to appoint and dismiss the Supreme Leader of Iran; and Mojtaba Khamenei is the current recent supreme leader of Iran. Seyyed Ali Khamenei was the Leader of Iran during this term, until his assassination on 28 February 2026.

The elections took place on 1 March 2024, with the Inauguration occurring on 21 May 2024.

== Members ==
The list is ordered Alphabetically.

Members with * next to their name, indicates they died while in office or died before taking an oath to become a member officially.

- Alborz
1. Hossein Radaei
2. Mohammad Reza Fallah Tafti
- Ardabil
1. Hasan Amili
2. Yadollah Safari
- Bushehr
1. Hashem Hosseini Bushehri
- Chaharmahal and Bakhtiari
1. Abdullah Keyvani Hafeshjani
- East Azerbaijan
1. Ali Malakouti
2. Javad Hajizadeh Koljahi
3. Mohammad Taghi Pourmohammadi
4. Seyyed Baqer Seyyedi Bonabi
5. Seyed Mohammad Ali Ale-Hashem * 19 May 2024 (before officially being a member)
- Fars
1. Ahmad Beheshti
2. Ali Akbar Kalantari
3. Lotfollah Dezhkam
4. Seyyed Alireza Dana
5. Seyyed Mohammad Ali Modarresi Tabatabaei
- Gilan
1. Ali Kazemi Gilani
2. Rasoul Falahati Gilani
3. Reza Ramezani Gilani
4. Seyed Ali Hosseini Ashkevari
- Golestan
1. Kamal Akhund Gharavi
2. Seyed Mohsen Taheri
- Hamadan
1. Habibollah Shabani Mouseghi
2. Seyed Mostafa Mousavi Faraz
- Hormozgan
1. Mohsen Ebrahimi
- Ilam
1. Vaed Moradbeigi
- Isfahan
1. Morteza Moghtadai
2. Mustafa Hassanti
3. Seyed Abolhasan Mahdavi
4. Seyed Saeed Hosseini
5. Seyed Yousef Tabatabai Nejad
- Kerman
1. Ahmad Sheikh Baha'i
2. Aman-Allah Alimoradi
3. Seyed Ahmad Khatami
- Kermanshah
1. Aman Narimani
2. Mustafa Alema
- Khuzestan
1. Abbas Ka'bi
2. Amir Reza Hedaei
3. Hossein Rafaei
4. Mohsen Heidari Alekasir
5. Seyed Ali Shafiei * 28 December 2025
6. Seyed Abolhassan Hassanzadeh
- Kohgiluyeh and Boyer-Ahmad
1. Seyed Sharaf Aldin Malek Hosseini
- Kurdistan
1. Faegh Rostami
2. Iqbal Bahmani
- Lorestan
1. Ahmad Moballeghi
2. Hashem Niazi
- Markazi
1. Ali Abbasi (cleric)
2. Mohsen Araki
- Mazandaran
1. Ali Moalemi
2. Mohammad Baqer Mohammadi Laeini
3. Seyed Rahim Tavakol
4. Seyed Sadegh Pishnamazi
- North Khorasan
1. Gholamreza Fayazi
- Qazvin
1. Ali Eslami (cleric)
2. Hossein Mozafari
- Qom
1. Seyed Mohammad Saeedi
- Razavi Khorasan
1. Gholamreza Moghiseh
2. Hassan Alemi
3. Seyed Ahmad Alamolhoda
4. Seyed Ahmad Hosseini Khorasani
5. Seyed Mohammad-Reza Modarresi Yazdi
6. Seyed Mojtaba Hosseini
- Semnan
1. Mahdi Mirbaqiri
- Sistan and Baluchestan
1. Abdurrahman Arefi
2. Ali Ahmad Salami
- South Khorasan
1. Seyed Ebrahim Raisi * 19 May 2024 (before officially being a member)
- Tehran
1. Abdol Javad Ebrahimi Far
2. Alireza Arafi
3. Ahmad Daneshzadeh Momen
4. Ali Momen Poor
5. Gholam Ali Naeimabadi
6. Gholam Ali Safai Bushehri
7. Gholamreza Mesbahi-Moghaddam
8. Ghorbanali Dorri-Najafabadi
9. Hossein Ali Saadi
10. Mahmoud Rajabi
11. Mohammad Ali Movahedi Kermani
12. Mohammad Mohammadi Araqi
13. Mohammad Reza Naseri Yazdi
14. Mohsen Qomi
15. Saeed Saleh Mirzaei
16. Seyed Mohammad Ali Mousavi Jazayeri
- West Azerbaijan
1. Asgar Dirbaz
2. Mohammad Hossein Bayati
3. Seyed Ali Akbar Ghoreishi
- Yazd
1. Abolghasem Wafi Yazdi
- Zanjan
1. Javad Jaffari

== See also ==
- Assembly of Experts
- 2024 Iranian Assembly of Experts election
- List of members in the Fifth Term of the Council of Experts
- List of Ayatollahs
