= Hadiabad =

Hadiabad (Persian: هادي اباد) may refer to:

- Hadiabad (Phagwara), India
- Hadiabad, Darab, Fars Province, Iran
- Hadiabad, Fasa, Fars Province, Iran
- Hadiabad, Golestan, Iran
- Hadiabad, Hamadan, Iran
- Hadiabad, Kerman, Iran
- Hadiabad, Khuzestan, Iran
- Hadiabad, Lorestan, Iran
- Hadiabad, Qazvin, Iran
