= Beyk Inanlu =

Neighborhood in Fars province, Iran

Beyk Inaloo Persian: بيك اينالو
- Neighborhood
- Location within Iran
- Coordinates: 28°54′28″N 54°07′49″E
- Country: Iran
- Province: Fars
- County: Fasa
- District: Sheshdeh and Qarah Bolagh
- City: Qarah Bolagh

Population (2011)
  - Total: 1,714
- Time zone: UTC+3:30 (IRST)

Beyk Inanlu (Persian: بيك اينالو) (Note: Also romanized as Beyk Īnānlū; also known as Beyg Īnānlū) is a neighborhood in the city of Qarah Bolagh in Sheshdeh and Qarah Bolagh District, (Note: Formerly Sheshdeh District) Fasa County, Fars province, Iran.

== Demographics ==
=== Population ===
At the time of the 2006 National Census, Beyk Inanlu's population was 1,684 in 394 households, when it was a village in Qarah Bolagh Rural District. The following census in 2011 counted 1,714 people in 461 households.

In 2013, the villages of Hoseynabad, Beyk Inanlu, Dugan-e Olya, Dugan-e Sofla, and Jorgheh merged to form the new city of Qarah Bolagh.
