= Jorgheh, Iran =

Neighborhood in Fars province, Iran

Jorgheh Persian: جرغه
- Neighborhood
- Location within Iran
- Coordinates: 28°53′52″N 54°08′17″E
- Country: Iran
- Province: Fars
- County: Fasa
- District: Sheshdeh and Qarah Bolagh
- City: Qarah Bolagh

Population (2011)
  - Total: 2,073
- Time zone: UTC+3:30 (IRST)

Jorgheh (Persian: جرغه) (Note: Also romanized as Jargheh) is a neighborhood in the city of Qarah Bolagh in Sheshdeh and Qarah Bolagh District, (Note: Formerly Sheshdeh District) Fasa County, Fars province, Iran.

== Demographics ==
=== Population ===
At the time of the 2006 National Census, Jargheh's population was 2,057 in 453 households, when it was a village in Qarah Bolagh Rural District. The following census in 2011 counted 2,073 people in 595 households.

In 2013, the villages of Hoseynabad, Beyk Inalu, Dugan-e Olya, Dugan-e Sofla, and Jargheh merged to form the new city of Qarah Bolagh.
