= Harun va Sakez =

Harun va Sakez هارون وسكز
- Village
- Location within Iran
- Coordinates: 28°45′42″N 53°41′55″E
- Country: Iran
- Province: Fars
- County: Fasa
- Bakhsh: Shibkaveh
- Rural District: Fedashkuyeh

Population (2006)
  - Total: 157
- Time zone: UTC+3:30 (IRST)
  - Summer (DST): UTC+4:30 (IRDT)

Harun va Sakez (Persian: هارون وسكز, also Romanized as Hārūn va Sakez; also known as Hārūn Sagez, Hārūn Sakez, and Hārūn Sakkez) is a village in Fedashkuyeh Rural District, Shibkaveh District, Fasa County, Fars province, Iran. At the 2006 census, its population was 157, in 33 families.
