= Qasemabad-e Bikheh Deraz =

Qasemabad-e Bikheh Deraz قاسم اباد بيخه دراز
- Village
- Country: Iran
- Province: Fars
- County: Fasa
- Bakhsh: Now Bandegan
- Rural District: Now Bandegan

Population (2006)
  - Total: 35
- Time zone: UTC+3:30 (IRST)
  - Summer (DST): UTC+4:30 (IRDT)

Qasemabad-e Bikheh Deraz (Persian: قاسم اباد بيخه دراز, also Romanized as Qāsemābād-e Bīkheh Derāz) is a village in Now Bandegan Rural District, Now Bandegan District, Fasa County, Fars province, Iran. At the 2006 census, its population was 35, in 7 families.
