= Senan, Iran =

Senan سنان
- Village
- Location within Iran
- Coordinates: 28°48′26″N 53°45′06″E
- Country: Iran
- Province: Fars
- County: Fasa
- Bakhsh: Shibkaveh
- Rural District: Fedashkuyeh

Population (2006)
  - Total: 1,854
- Time zone: UTC+3:30 (IRST)
  - Summer (DST): UTC+4:30 (IRDT)

Senan (Persian: سنان, also Romanized as Senān and Sanān) is a village in Fedashkuyeh Rural District, Shibkaveh District, Fasa County, Fars province, Iran. At the 2006 census, its population was 1,854, in 429 families.
