= Dowdjabad =

Dowdjabad دودج اباد
- Village
- Location within Iran
- Coordinates: 28°53′05″N 53°45′55″E
- Country: Iran
- Province: Fars
- County: Fasa
- Bakhsh: Now Bandegan
- Rural District: Now Bandegan

Population (2006)
  - Total: 90
- Time zone: UTC+3:30 (IRST)
  - Summer (DST): UTC+4:30 (IRDT)

Dowdjabad (Persian: دودج اباد, also Romanized as Dowdjābād; also known as Dowjābād) is a village in Now Bandegan Rural District, Now Bandegan District, Fasa County, Fars province, Iran. At the 2006 census, its population was 90, in 18 families.
