= Sheydanak =

Sheydanak شيدانك
- Village
- Location within Iran
- Coordinates: 28°57′35″N 53°51′23″E
- Country: Iran
- Province: Fars
- County: Fasa
- Bakhsh: Now Bandegan
- Rural District: Now Bandegan

Population (2006)
  - Total: 78
- Time zone: UTC+3:30 (IRST)
  - Summer (DST): UTC+4:30 (IRDT)

Sheydanak (Persian: شيدانك, also Romanized as Sheydānak) is a village in Now Bandegan Rural District, Now Bandegan District, Fasa County, Fars province, Iran. At the 2006 census, its population was 78, in 22 families.
