= Vaselabad =

Vaselabad واصل اباد
- Village
- Location within Iran
- Coordinates: 28°52′09″N 53°53′28″E
- Country: Iran
- Province: Fars
- County: Fasa
- Bakhsh: Now Bandegan
- Rural District: Now Bandegan

Population (2006)
  - Total: 338
- Time zone: UTC+3:30 (IRST)
  - Summer (DST): UTC+4:30 (IRDT)

Vaselabad (Persian: واصل اباد, also Romanized as Vāşelābād) is a village in Now Bandegan Rural District, Now Bandegan District, Fasa County, Fars province, Iran. At the 2006 census, its population was 338, in 89 families.
