= Vakilabad, Sheshdeh and Qarah Bulaq =

Vakilabad وکیل‌آباد
- Village
- Location within Iran
- Coordinates: 28°55′43″N 54°03′03″E
- Country: Iran
- Province: Fars
- County: Fasa
- Bakhsh: Sheshdeh and Qarah Bulaq
- Rural District: Sheshdeh

Population (2006)
  - Total: 814
- Time zone: UTC+3:30 (IRST)
  - Summer (DST): UTC+4:30 (IRDT)

Vakilabad (Persian: وکیل‌آباد, also Romanized as Vakīlābād) is a village in Sheshdeh Rural District, Sheshdeh and Qarah Bulaq District, Fasa County, Fars province, Iran. At the 2006 census, its population was 814, in 182 families.
