= Zangeneh, Fasa =

Zangeneh زنگنه
- Village
- Location within Iran
- Coordinates: 28°51′41″N 54°09′25″E
- Country: Iran
- Province: Fars
- County: Fasa
- Bakhsh: Sheshdeh and Qarah Bulaq
- Rural District: Qarah Bulaq

Population (2006)
  - Total: 2,854
- Time zone: UTC+3:30 (IRST)
  - Summer (DST): UTC+4:30 (IRDT)

Zangeneh (Persian: زنگنه) is a village in Qarah Bulaq Rural District, Sheshdeh and Qarah Bulaq District, Fasa County, Fars province, Iran. At the 2006 census, its population was 2,854, in 674 families.
