= Dindarlu =

Dindarlu ديندارلو
- Village
- Location within Iran
- Coordinates: 28°55′31″N 54°07′06″E
- Country: Iran
- Province: Fars
- County: Fasa
- Bakhsh: Sheshdeh and Qarah Bulaq
- Rural District: Qarah Bulaq

Population (2006)
  - Total: 1,430
- Time zone: UTC+3:30 (IRST)
  - Summer (DST): UTC+4:30 (IRDT)

Dindarlu (Persian: ديندارلو, also Romanized as Dīndārlū and Dindarloo) is a village in Qarah Bulaq Rural District, Sheshdeh and Qarah Bulaq District, Fasa County, Fars province, Iran. At the 2006 census, its population was 1,430, in 301 families.
