= Darakuyeh =

Darakuyeh داراكويه
- Village
- Location within Iran
- Coordinates: 28°50′19″N 54°11′00″E
- Country: Iran
- Province: Fars
- County: Fasa
- Bakhsh: Sheshdeh and Qarah Bulaq
- Rural District: Qarah Bulaq

Population (2006)
  - Total: 968
- Time zone: UTC+3:30 (IRST)
  - Summer (DST): UTC+4:30 (IRDT)

Darakuyeh (Persian: داراكويه, also Romanized as Dārākūyeh and Dārkūyeh; also known as Darāku, Dārākubeh, and Deh Kooyeh) is a village in Qarah Bulaq Rural District, Sheshdeh and Qarah Bulaq District, Fasa County, Fars province, Iran. At the 2006 census, its population was 968, in 226 families.
