= Hoseynabad-e Tang-e Khomar =

Hoseynabad-e Tang-e Khomar حسين ابادتنگ خمار
- Village
- Location within Iran
- Coordinates: 28°50′59″N 53°44′35″E
- Country: Iran
- Province: Fars
- County: Fasa
- Bakhsh: Now Bandegan
- Rural District: Now Bandegan

Population (2006)
  - Total: 16
- Time zone: UTC+3:30 (IRST)
  - Summer (DST): UTC+4:30 (IRDT)

Hoseynabad-e Tang-e Khomar (Persian: حسين ابادتنگ خمار, also Romanized as Ḩoseynābād-e Tang-e Khomār; also known as Ḩoseynābād) is a village in Now Bandegan Rural District, Now Bandegan District, Fasa County, Fars province, Iran. At the 2006 census, its population was 16, in 4 families.
