= Aliabad, Sheshdeh and Qarah Bulaq =

Aliabad علي اباد
- Village
- Location within Iran
- Coordinates: 28°55′39″N 54°06′07″E
- Country: Iran
- Province: Fars
- County: Fasa
- Bakhsh: Sheshdeh and Qarah Bulaq
- Rural District: Qarah Bulaq

Population (2006)
  - Total: 143
- Time zone: UTC+3:30 (IRST)
  - Summer (DST): UTC+4:30 (IRDT)

Aliabad (Persian: علي اباد, also Romanized as 'Alīābād) is a village in Qarah Bulaq Rural District, Sheshdeh and Qarah Bulaq District, Fasa County, Fars province, Iran. At the 2006 census, its population was 143, in 39 families.
