= Jafarabad, Now Bandegan =

Jafarabad جعفرآباد
- village
- Location within Iran
- Coordinates: 28°50′51″N 53°55′27″E
- Country: Iran
- Province: Fars
- County: Fasa
- Bakhsh: Now Bandegan
- Rural District: Now Bandegan

Population (2006)
  - Total: 123
- Time zone: UTC+3:30 (IRST)
  - Summer (DST): UTC+4:30 (IRDT)

Jafarabad (Persian: جعفرآباد, also Romanized as Ja‘farābād) is a village in Now Bandegan Rural District, Now Bandegan District, Fasa County, Fars province, Iran. At the 2006 census, its population was 123, in 27 families.
