= Karimabad-e Eskandari =

Karimabad-e Eskandari كريم اباداسكندري
- Village
- Location within Iran
- Coordinates: 28°55′07″N 54°01′19″E
- Country: Iran
- Province: Fars
- County: Fasa
- Bakhsh: Sheshdeh and Qarah Bulaq
- Rural District: Sheshdeh

Population (2006)
  - Total: 160
- Time zone: UTC+3:30 (IRST)
  - Summer (DST): UTC+4:30 (IRDT)

Karimabad-e Eskandari (Persian: كريم اباداسكندري, also Romanized as Karīmābād-e Eskandarī; also known as Karīmābād) is a village in Sheshdeh Rural District, Sheshdeh and Qarah Bulaq District, Fasa County, Fars province, Iran. At the 2006 census, its population was 160, in 35 families.
