= Kankan, Iran =

Kankan كنكان
- Village
- Location within Iran
- Coordinates: 28°48′04″N 53°46′24″E
- Country: Iran
- Province: Fars
- County: Fasa
- Bakhsh: Shibkaveh
- Rural District: Fedashkuyeh

Population (2006)
  - Total: 526
- Time zone: UTC+3:30 (IRST)
  - Summer (DST): UTC+4:30 (IRDT)

Kankan (Persian: كنكان, also Romanized as Kankān; also known as Kahtekān and Kankār) is a village in Fedashkuyeh Rural District, Shibkaveh District, Fasa County, Fars province, Iran. At the 2006 census, its population was 526, in 141 families.
