= Abbasabad-e Eskandari =

Abbasabad-e Eskandari عباس آباد اسکندری
- Village
- Location within Iran
- Coordinates: 28°54′54″N 54°02′28″E
- Country: Iran
- Province: Fars
- County: Fasa
- Bakhsh: Sheshdeh and Qarah Bulaq
- Rural District: Sheshdeh

Population (2016)
  - Total: 254
- Time zone: UTC+3:30 (IRST)

Abbasabad-e Eskandari (Persian: عباس آباد اسکندری, also Romanized as 'Abbāsābād-e Eskandarī; also known as 'Abbāsābād) is a village in Sheshdeh Rural District, Sheshdeh and Qarah Bulaq District, Fasa County, Fars province, Iran. At the 2006 census, its population was 336, in 75 families. In 2016, it had 254 people in 86 households.
