= Ghiasabad, Fasa =

Ghiasabad غياث‌آباد
- Village
- Location within Iran
- Coordinates: 28°51′53″N 53°45′51″E
- Country: Iran
- Province: Fars
- County: Fasa
- Bakhsh: Now Bandegan
- Rural District: Now Bandegan

Population (2006)
  - Total: 685
- Time zone: UTC+3:30 (IRST)
  - Summer (DST): UTC+4:30 (IRDT)

Ghiasabad (Persian: غياث‌آباد, also Romanized as Ghīās̄ābād and Ghasiābād; also known as Ghīyās̄ī, Qeyāsābād, and Qīās̄ābād) is a village in Now Bandegan Rural District, Now Bandegan District, Fasa County, Fars province, Iran. At the 2006 census, its population was 685, in 199 families.
