= Murdi, Fars =

Murdi موردي
- Village
- Location within Iran
- Coordinates: 28°54′26″N 53°55′03″E
- Country: Iran
- Province: Fars
- County: Fasa
- Bakhsh: Now Bandegan
- Rural District: Now Bandegan

Population (2006)
  - Total: 516
- Time zone: UTC+3:30 (IRST)
  - Summer (DST): UTC+4:30 (IRDT)

Murdi (Persian: موردي, also Romanized as Mūrdī; also known as Mordeh and Qal‘eh-e Mūrdī) is a village in Now Bandegan Rural District, Now Bandegan District, Fasa County, Fars province, Iran. At the 2006 census, its population was 516, in 112 families.
