= Shurabad, Fars =

Shurabad شورآباد
- Village
- Location within Iran
- Coordinates: 28°59′12″N 53°53′22″E
- Country: Iran
- Province: Fars
- County: Fasa
- Bakhsh: Now Bandegan
- Rural District: Now Bandegan

Population (2006)
  - Total: 252
- Time zone: UTC+3:30 (IRST)
  - Summer (DST): UTC+4:30 (IRDT)

Shurabad (Persian: شورآباد, also Romanized as Shūrābād; also known as Qal‘eh-ye Shūrābeh) is a village in Now Bandegan Rural District, Now Bandegan District, Fasa County, Fars province, Iran. At the 2006 census, its population was 252, in 47 families.
