= Hoseynabad, Sheshdeh and Qarah Bulaq =

Hoseynabad حسين اباد
- Village
- Location within Iran
- Coordinates: 28°55′38″N 54°01′46″E
- Country: Iran
- Province: Fars
- County: Fasa
- Bakhsh: Sheshdeh and Qarah Bulaq
- Rural District: Sheshdeh

Population (2006)
  - Total: 461
- Time zone: UTC+3:30 (IRST)
  - Summer (DST): UTC+4:30 (IRDT)

Hoseynabad (Persian: حسين اباد, also Romanized as Ḩoseynābād) is a village in Sheshdeh Rural District, Sheshdeh and Qarah Bulaq District, Fasa County, Fars province, Iran. At the 2006 census, its population was 461, in 117 families.
