= Emamzadeh Mohammad, Fars =

Emamzadeh Mohammad امامزاده محمد
- Village
- Location within Iran
- Coordinates: 28°48′08″N 53°43′00″E
- Country: Iran
- Province: Fars
- County: Fasa
- Bakhsh: Shibkaveh
- Rural District: Fedashkuyeh

Population (2006)
  - Total: 256
- Time zone: UTC+3:30 (IRST)
  - Summer (DST): UTC+4:30 (IRDT)

Emamzadeh Mohammad (Persian: امامزاده محمد, also Romanized as Emāmzādeh Moḩammad) is a village in Fedashkuyeh Rural District, Shibkaveh District, Fasa County, Fars province, Iran. At the 2006 census, its population was 256, in 60 families.
