= Mehdiabad, Now Bandegan =

Mehdiabad مهدي اباد
- Village
- Location within Iran
- Coordinates: 28°53′32″N 53°55′50″E
- Country: Iran
- Province: Fars
- County: Fasa
- Bakhsh: Now Bandegan
- Rural District: Now Bandegan

Population (2006)
  - Total: 468
- Time zone: UTC+3:30 (IRST)
  - Summer (DST): UTC+4:30 (IRDT)

Mehdiabad (Persian: مهدي اباد, also Romanized as Mehdīābād) is a village in Now Bandegan Rural District, Now Bandegan District, Fasa County, Fars province, Iran. At the 2006 census, its population was 468, in 96 families.
