= Amir Hajjilu =

Village in Fars province, Iran

Amir Hajjilu Persian: اميرحاجيلو
- Village
- Location within Iran
- Coordinates: 28°57′11″N 54°04′42″E
- Country: Iran
- Province: Fars
- County: Fasa
- District: Sheshdeh and Qarah Bolagh
- Rural District: Qarah Bolagh

Population (2016)
  - Total: 3,623
- Time zone: UTC+3:30 (IRST)

Amir Hajjilu (Persian: اميرحاجيلو) (Note: Also romanized as Amīr Ḩājjīlū; also known as Amir Hajloo and Amīr Ḩājlū) is a village in Qarah Bolagh Rural District of Sheshdeh and Qarah Bolagh District, (Note: Formerly Sheshdeh District) Fasa County, Fars province, Iran.

== Demographics ==
=== Population ===
At the time of the 2006 National Census, the village's population was 3,728 in 848 households. The following census in 2011 counted 3,666 people in 1,017 households. The 2016 census measured the population of the village as 3,623 people in 1,099 households. It was the most populous village in its rural district.
