= Jelian =

Jelian or Jelyan or Jalyan or Jalian or Jaleyan (Persian: جليان) may refer to:

- Jelian, Fasa
- Jelyan, Marvdasht
