= Sarvak, Fars =

Sarvak سروك
- Village
- Location within Iran
- Coordinates: 28°58′13″N 54°02′13″E
- Country: Iran
- Province: Fars
- County: Fasa
- Bakhsh: Sheshdeh and Qarah Bulaq
- Rural District: Sheshdeh

Population (2006)
  - Total: 452
- Time zone: UTC+3:30 (IRST)
  - Summer (DST): UTC+4:30 (IRDT)

Sarvak (Persian: سروك) is a village in Sheshdeh Rural District, Sheshdeh and Qarah Bulaq District, Fasa County, Fars province, Iran. At the 2006 census, its population was 452, in 102 families.
