= Dugan (disambiguation) =

Dugan or Duggan is an Irish surname (and a list of people with the name).

Dugan or Duggan may also refer to:

== Fiction ==
- Duggan (TV series), a New Zealand TV series
- Dixie Dugan, syndicated newspaper comic strip
- Dugan Duck, Disney comic book character
- Dum Dum Dugan, fictional character in Marvel Comics
- Mickey Dugan, "The Yellow Kid", lead character in Hogan's Alley comic strip
- Pat Dugan, fictional superhero in DC comics
- President Dugan, the supreme leader of Allied forces in the video game Red Alert 2

== Places ==
In the United States

- Duggan, Missouri, an unincorporated community

In Iran

- Dugan, Iran, a village in Iran
- Dugan-e Olya, a village in Iran
- Dugan-e Sofla, a village in Iran

Elsewhere

- Duggan, Edmonton, Alberta, Canada
- Duggan, Buenos Aires, Argentina
- Dugan (crater), a lunar crater

== Other ==
- Dugan, a Buddhist temple building, see Buddhism in Buryatia
