= Fedashkuyeh =

Village in Fars province, Iran

Fedashkuyeh Persian: فدشكويه
- Village
- Location within Iran
- Coordinates: 28°47′44″N 53°45′34″E
- Country: Iran
- Province: Fars
- County: Fasa
- District: Shibkaveh
- Rural District: Fedashkuyeh

Population (2016)
  - Total: 4,114
- Time zone: UTC+3:30 (IRST)

Fedashkuyeh (Persian: فدشكويه) (Note: Also romanized as Fedashkūyeh, Fedeshkūyeh, and Fedshkūyeh; also known as Fāshkūyeh, Fedeshkūh, Fidishkun, and Fīdūshkūh) is a village in, and the capital of, Fedashkuyeh Rural District of Shibkaveh District, Fasa County, Fars province, Iran.

== Demographics ==
=== Population ===
At the time of the 2006 National Census, the village's population was 4,686 in 1,114 households. The following census in 2011 counted 4,502 people in 1,210 households. The 2016 census measured the population of the village as 4,114 people in 1,202 households. It was the most populous village in its rural district.
