= Dowlatabad-e Dasht-e Seh Chah =

Dowlatabad-e Dasht-e Seh Chah دولت اباددشت سه چاه
- Village
- Location within Iran
- Coordinates: 28°46′25″N 54°02′28″E
- Country: Iran
- Province: Fars
- County: Fasa
- Bakhsh: Now Bandegan
- Rural District: Now Bandegan

Population (2006)
  - Total: 503
- Time zone: UTC+3:30 (IRST)
  - Summer (DST): UTC+4:30 (IRDT)

Dowlatabad-e Dasht-e Seh Chah (Persian: دولت اباددشت سه چاه, also Romanized as Dowlatābād-e Dasht-e Seh Chāh; also known as Dowlatābād-e Seh Chāh) is a village in Now Bandegan Rural District, Now Bandegan District, Fasa County, Fars province, Iran. At the 2006 census, its population was 503, in 116 families.
