= Abuzarabad, Fars =

Neighborhood in Fars province, Iran

Abuzarabad Persian: ابوذراباد
- Neighborhood
- Location within Iran
- Coordinates: 28°42′13″N 53°51′50″E
- Country: Iran
- Province: Fars
- County: Fasa
- District: Shibkaveh
- City: Miyanshahr

Population (2011)
  - Total: 762
- Time zone: UTC+3:30 (IRST)

Abuzarabad (Persian: ابوذراباد) (Note: Also romanized as Abūz̄arābād) is a neighborhood in the city of Miyanshahr of Shibkaveh District in Fasa County, Fars province, Iran.

== Demographics ==
=== Population ===
At the time of the 2006 National Census, Abuzarabad's population was 562 in 120 households, when it was a village in Miyan Deh Rural District. The following census in 2011 counted 762 people in 207 households.

In 2013, the villages of Miyan Deh and Abuzarabad merged to form the new city of Miyanshahr.
