= Jelian, Fasa =

Jelian جليان
- Village
- Location within Iran
- Coordinates: 28°52′41″N 53°52′52″E
- Country: Iran
- Province: Fars
- County: Fasa
- Bakhsh: Now Bandegan
- Rural District: Now Bandegan

Population (2006)
  - Total: 1,735
- Time zone: UTC+3:30 (IRST)
  - Summer (DST): UTC+4:30 (IRDT)

Jelian (Persian: جليان, also Romanized as Jelīān, Jaleyān, Jalīān, and Jalyān) is a village in Now Bandegan Rural District, Now Bandegan District, Fasa County, Fars province, Iran. At the 2006 census, its population was 1,735, in 443 families.
