= Qasemabad-e Olya, Fars =

Qasemabad-e Olya قاسم ابادعليا
- Village
- Location within Iran
- Coordinates: 28°55′59″N 54°04′55″E
- Country: Iran
- Province: Fars
- County: Fasa
- Bakhsh: Sheshdeh and Qarah Bulaq
- Rural District: Qarah Bulaq

Population (2006)
  - Total: 868
- Time zone: UTC+3:30 (IRST)
  - Summer (DST): UTC+4:30 (IRDT)

Qasemabad-e Olya (Persian: قاسم ابادعليا, also Romanized as Qāsemābād-e 'Olyā; also known as Qāsemābād-e Bālā) is a village in Qarah Bulaq Rural District, Sheshdeh and Qarah Bulaq District, Fasa County, Fars province, Iran. At the 2006 census, its population was 868, in 222 families.
