= Miyan Deh, Fasa =

Neighborhood in Fars province, Iran

Miyan Deh Persian: ميانده
- Neighborhood
- Location within Iran
- Coordinates: 28°42′55″N 53°51′22″E
- Country: Iran
- Province: Fars
- County: Fasa
- District: Shibkaveh
- City: Miyanshahr

Population (2011)
  - Total: 5,495
- Time zone: UTC+3:30 (IRST)

Miyan Deh (Persian: ميانده) (Note: Also romanized as Meyān Deh, Mīān Deh, and Mīyān Deh; also known as Eslāmābād) is a neighborhood in the city of Miyanshahr of Shibkaveh District in Fasa County, Fars province, Iran.

== Demographics ==
=== Population ===
At the time of the 2006 National Census, Miyan Deh's population was 5,524 in 1,268 households, when it was a village in Miyan Deh Rural District. The following census in 2011 counted 5,495 people in 1,473 households.

In 2013, the villages of Miyan Deh and Abuzarabad merged to form the new city of Miyanshahr.

== Notable residents ==
Ahmad Beheshti, cleric and politician
