= Akbarabad, Fasa =

Village in Fars province, Iran

Akbarabad Persian: اكبراباد
- Village
- Location within Iran
- Coordinates: 28°56′57″N 54°02′26″E
- Country: Iran
- Province: Fars
- County: Fasa
- District: Sheshdeh and Qarah Bolagh
- Rural District: Sheshdeh

Population (2016)
  - Total: 1,539
- Time zone: UTC+3:30 (IRST)

Akbarabad (Persian: اكبراباد) (Note: Also romanized as Akbarābād and Akberābād; also known as Akbarābād-e Sheshdeh) is a village in Sheshdeh Rural District of Sheshdeh and Qarah Bolagh District, (Note: Formerly Sheshdeh District) Fasa County, Fars province, Iran.

== Demographics ==
=== Population ===
At the time of the 2006 National Census, the village's population was 2,230 in 534 households. The following census in 2011 counted 1,933 people in 549 households. The 2016 census measured the population of the village as 1,539 people in 467 households. It was the most populous village in its rural district.
