= Dowlatabad, Sheshdeh and Qarah Bulaq =

Dowlatabad دولتاباد
- Village
- Location within Iran
- Coordinates: 28°55′41″N 54°00′28″E
- Country: Iran
- Province: Fars
- County: Fasa
- Bakhsh: Sheshdeh and Qarah Bulaq
- Rural District: Sheshdeh

Population (2006)
  - Total: 1,023
- Time zone: UTC+3:30 (IRST)
  - Summer (DST): UTC+4:30 (IRDT)

Dowlatabad (Persian: دولتاباد, also Romanized as Dowlatābād; also known as Daulatābād and Dsulstābād) is a village in Sheshdeh Rural District, Sheshdeh and Qarah Bulaq District, Fasa County, Fars province, Iran. At the 2006 census, its population was 1,023, in 252 families.
