= Khurangan =

Village in Fars province, Iran

Khurangan Persian: خورنگان
- Village
- Location within Iran
- Coordinates: 28°47′53″N 53°48′53″E
- Country: Iran
- Province: Fars
- County: Fasa
- District: Now Bandegan
- Rural District: Now Bandegan

Population (2016)
  - Total: 2,437
- Time zone: UTC+3:30 (IRST)

Khurangan (Persian: خورنگان)) (Note: Also romanized as Khürangän; also known as Yaseriyeh (ياسريه)) is a village in Now Bandegan Rural District of Now Bandegan District, Fasa County, Fars province, Iran.

== Demographics ==
=== Population ===
At the time of the 2006 National Census, the village's population was 2,619 in 626 households. The following census in 2011 counted 2,493 people in 727 households. The 2016 census measured the population of the village as 2,437 people in 732 households. It was the most populous village in its rural district.
