= Deh Shib-e Mirza Hasani =

Deh Shib-e Mirza Hasani ده شيب ميرزاحسني
- Village
- Location within Iran
- Coordinates: 28°51′50″N 53°51′10″E
- Country: Iran
- Province: Fars
- County: Fasa
- Bakhsh: Now Bandegan
- Rural District: Now Bandegan

Population (2006)
  - Total: 584
- Time zone: UTC+3:30 (IRST)
  - Summer (DST): UTC+4:30 (IRDT)

Deh Shib-e Mirza Hasani (Persian: ده شيب ميرزاحسني, also Romanized as Deh Shīb-e Mīrzā Ḩasanī; also known as Deh Shīb) is a village in Now Bandegan Rural District, Now Bandegan District, Fasa County, Fars province, Iran. At the 2006 census, its population was 584, in 135 families.

== Geography ==
Deh Shib-e Mirza Hasani is located in the southern part of Fars province, in south-central Iran. The settlement is situated at approximately 28.8638° north latitude and 53.8526° east longitude. Geographical databases also record the locality under the names Deh Shir, Deh Shīr and Deh Shīb. GeoNames identifies it as a populated place within Fars province.
