= Manhush =

Manhush may refer:

- Manhush, Donetsk Oblast, a town in Ukraine near the Sea of Azov
- Manhush, Khuzestan Province, a village in Iran
