= Qasemabad-e Pain =

Qasemabad-e Pain (Persian: قاسمابادپائین) may refer to:

- Qasemabad-e Pain, Fars
- Qasemabad-e Pain, Gilan
- Qasemabad-e Pain, Sistan and Baluchestan
