= Servak =

Servak or Seruk or Sarvak (Persian: سروك) may refer to:

- Sarvak, Fars
- Servak, Kohgiluyeh and Boyer-Ahmad

== See also ==
- Tang-e Sarvak
