= Qasemabad-e Bala =

Qasemabad-e Bala (Persian: قاسمابادبالا) may refer to:

- Qasemabad-e Bala, Fars
- Qasemabad-e Bala, Gilan
