= Dugan-e Sofla, Iran =

Neighborhood in Fars province, Iran

Dugan-e Sofla Persian: دوگان سفلي
- Former Neighborhood
- Location within Iran
- Coordinates: 28°54′05″N 54°07′37″E
- Country: Iran
- Province: Fars
- County: Fasa
- District: Sheshdeh and Qarah Bolagh
- City: Qarah Bolagh

Population (2011)
  - Total: 807
- Time zone: UTC+3:30 (IRST)

Dugan-e Sofla (Persian: دوگان سفلي) (Note: Also romanized as Dūgān-e Soflá; also known as Dogān, Dogān-e Soflá, Doghān, and Dūgān) is a neighborhood in the city of Qarah Bolagh in Sheshdeh and Qarah Bolagh District, (Note: Formerly Sheshdeh District) Fasa County, Fars province, Iran.

== Demographics ==
=== Population ===
At the time of the 2006 National Census, Dugan-e Sofla's population was 805 in 198 households, when it was a village in Qarah Bolagh Rural District. The following census in 2011 counted 807 people in 227 households.

In 2013, the villages of Hoseynabad, Beyk Inanlu, Dugan-e Olya, Dugan-e Sofla, and Jargheh merged to form the new city of Qarah Bolagh.
