= Shibkaveh District =

Shibkaveh District may refer to:

- Shibkaveh District (Fasa County), Fars province, Iran
- Shibkaveh District (Bandar Lengeh County), Hormozgan province, Iran
