= Qasemabad-e Sofla =

Qasemabad-e Sofla (Persian: قاسم ابادسفلي) may refer to:

- Qasemabad-e Sofla, Fars
- Qasemabad-e Sofla, Gilan
- Qasemabad-e Sofla, Markazi
