= Qurʾān of al-Zaʿfarānī =

Ancient Quranic manuscript

- Editor: Morteza Kariminia
- Author: Abu 'l-Fakhr b. Abi 'l-Faḍl al-Zaʿfarānī (translator and scribe)
- Language: Arabic with interlinear Persian translation
- Subject: Quranic studies, early Quranic translations
- Publisher: Farhang-i Siyadat Publications
- Publication date: 1404 SH / 2026 CE
- Publication place: Iran
- Media type: Print (facsimile and critical edition)
- Pages: 783 (introduction and text)
- ISBN: 978-622-89623-0-6

The Qurʾān of al-Zaʿfarānī is the oldest dated, complete manuscript of the Quran containing a continuous, independent, and pure Persian translation. This codex was transcribed and translated in Rabīʿ al-Ākhar (or Rabīʿ al-Thānī) of 546 AH (August 1151 CE) by Abu 'l-Fakhr b. Abi 'l-Faḍl al-Zaʿfarānī. The original manuscript is currently housed in the Reza Abbasi Museum in Tehran under the accession number 551. A critical edition and facsimile reproduction of this work was published in 2026 by Morteza Kariminia, and several academic symposia have been held to examine its historical and linguistic characteristics.

== History of discovery and provenance ==
For many years, this manuscript remained unrecognized within the vaults of the Reza Abbasi Museum. In the autumn of 2017, during a visit to the museum's calligraphy hall, Morteza Kariminia noticed two illuminated opening folios of this manuscript (containing the sūras of al-Fātiḥa and al-Baqara), which had been placed on display solely due to the aesthetic merit of their illumination. Following subsequent inquiries, he identified, transcribed, and edited the complete manuscript from the museum's reserves.

According to marginalia within the Tehran manuscript, in 1337 AH (1918 CE)—coinciding with the severe outbreak of the Spanish flu pandemic in Iran—this codex was located in the vicinity of Kerman (in settlements such as Deh Shib, Bagh-i Bala, and Tikdar). The scribe of these marginal notes documented the high local mortality rate, citing 10 deaths per day. The manuscript was ultimately acquired in the 1970s and transferred to the Reza Abbasi Museum.

== Academic significance and translation characteristics ==
The primary scholarly significance of the Qurʾān of al-Zaʿfarānī lies in its presentation of a pure and independent translation, devoid of the extensive exegetical digressions characteristic of contemporary commentaries (such as the tafsīrs of al-Ṭabarī, Sūrābādī, and Maybudī). Key features of this translation include:

- Strict Literalism: The translator employed a rigid word-for-word methodology, structuring the Persian syntax to directly mirror the Arabic syntax.
- Refinement of Sūrābādī's Exegesis: Textual analysis indicates that the translator relied heavily on the content of Sūrābādī's tafsīr (d. 494 AH). However, al-Zaʿfarānī systematically excised Sūrābādī's exegetical additions, extracting and processing only the pure translation.
- Terminological Consistency: In contrast to Sūrābādī, al-Zaʿfarānī consciously selected consistent Persian equivalents for recurring Arabic terms throughout the text (e.g., employing az furūd-i ū for min dūnihi and bīk for lākin/bal).
- Translation of Proper Nouns: The translator insisted on rendering proper names and specific Quranic terminology into Persian. Among the most remarkable instances is the translation of the blessed name "Muḥammad" as Sutūda (The Praised One).

== Archaic Persian orthography ==
The manuscript exhibits orthographic features typical of the fifth and sixth centuries AH. These encompass the writing of the letters zh, ch, and p with a single dot underneath (as z, j, and b), the writing of gāf as kāf, the conjoining of specific words (e.g., kī, jī, hark instead of kih, chih, harkih), the use of the dhāl-i fārsī (such as in budh and rasīdandh), and the pluralization of words ending in alif with a double alif (e.g., bīnāʾān, tanhāʾān).

== Select glossary of archaic and rare Persian words ==
The Persian translation of the Qurʾān of al-Zaʿfarānī is a vital source in the historical lexicography of the Persian language. The translator endeavored to utilize authentic Persian equivalents wherever possible, some of which reflect the regional dialects of Khurasan, Nishapur, and Rayy during the sixth century AH. A selection of these archaic terms includes:

- Ākhariyān (آخریان): The Persian equivalent for the Quranic terms matāʿ and biḍāʿa.
- Az zih bishudagān (از زه بشدگان): Equivalent for al-qawāʿid (elderly or post-menopausal women).
- Andarvānī kard īshānrā (اندروانی کرد ایشانرا): Employed to translate the word dallāhumā in the narrative of Adam and Eve's deception.
- Bisgālīm / Bisgāland (بِسگالیم / بِسگالند): Equivalents for verbs such as akīdu and yakīdū (meaning to devise, plot, or scheme).
- Pidar-i pariyān (پدر پریان): A notable translation for the term al-jānn.
- Tandīshā / Tan-dīshā (تندیس‌ها / تن‌دیس‌ها): The Persian equivalent for al-tamāthīl.
- Bīk (بیک): A uniform equivalent used throughout the Quran for Arabic adversative particles such as lākin and bal.

== Scribe's identity and theological affiliation ==
The scribe of the codex is recorded as Abu 'l-Fakhr b. Abi 'l-Faḍl al-Zaʿfarānī. Some scholars previously hypothesized that his identity might correspond with Yaḥyā b. Muḥammad b. ʿUmar, known as "Abu 'l-Fakhr b. Abi 'l-Faḍl al-Kātib" (b. 551 AH in Mosul). However, because the transcription date of the Qurʾān of al-Zaʿfarānī (546 AH) predates the Mosuli scribe's birth, this hypothesis has been firmly refuted. The nisba "al-Zaʿfarānī" indicates his affiliation with the Zaʿfarāniyya, a branch of the Najjāriyya Muʿtazilite sect active in Rayy. Due to his Muʿtazilite theological leanings, al-Zaʿfarānī actively de-anthropomorphized the translation of verses concerning divine attributes. For instance, contrary to literalist methodologies, he translated the phrase istawā ʿalā al-ʿarsh (established Himself above the Throne) as "He turned His attention to creating the Throne" (bar āfarīdan-i ʿarsh iqbāl kard).

Abu 'l-Fakhr al-Zaʿfarānī's independence from Sūrābādī's tafsīr in theological matters is also patently clear. For instance, regarding the contentious issue of the "createdness of the Quran", Sūrābādī interpreted the Quranic term muḥdath as dhākir or sharaf to avoid attributing temporal creation (ḥudūth) to the Quran. Conversely, grounded in his Muʿtazilite framework, al-Zaʿfarānī explicitly translated it as nawgufta (newly spoken) and naw-āwarda (newly brought). Furthermore, in verses where verbs carrying negative connotations (such as plotting, deceiving, and mocking) are attributed to God, al-Zaʿfarānī utilized alternative equivalents to prevent directly associating these actions with the Divine Essence. For example, he rendered makara Allāh as "God devised" (tadbīr kard khudāy) and Allāhu yastahziʾu bihim as "God shall requite their mockery" (khudāy mukāfāt kunad fusūs kardan-i īshānrā).

== Artistic features and Kufic inscription ==
The Tehran manuscript comprises 328 large folios. The script for both the Arabic text and the interlinear translation is an early archaic naskh. The opening spread is fully illuminated and gilded in a distinctively Seljuk style. In the center of this page, a Kufic inscription provides statistical data regarding the Quran, the surviving portion of which reads: "... and six hundred and fourteen words, and its letter count is three hundred twenty-one thousand, two hundred and fifty letters, and God knows best."

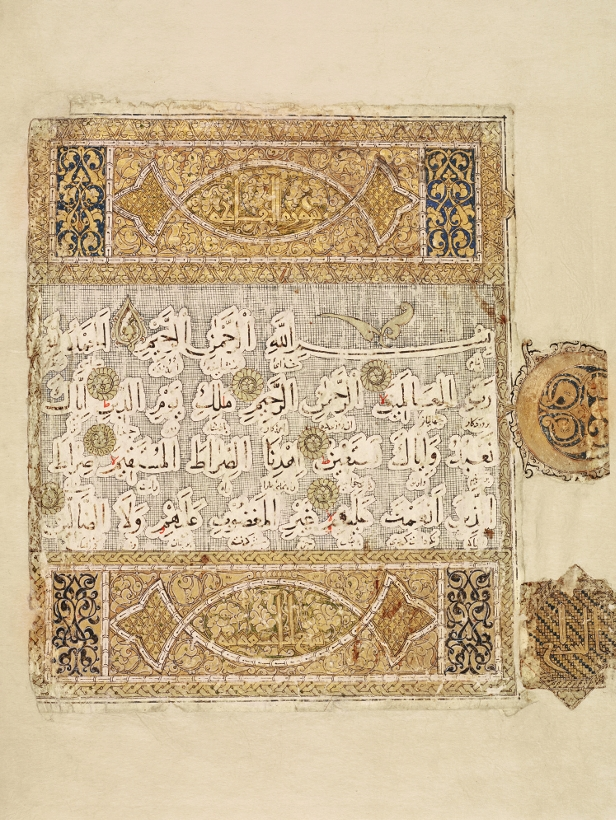
Surah Al-Hamd, Riḍā ʿAbbāsī Museum manuscript, Tehran

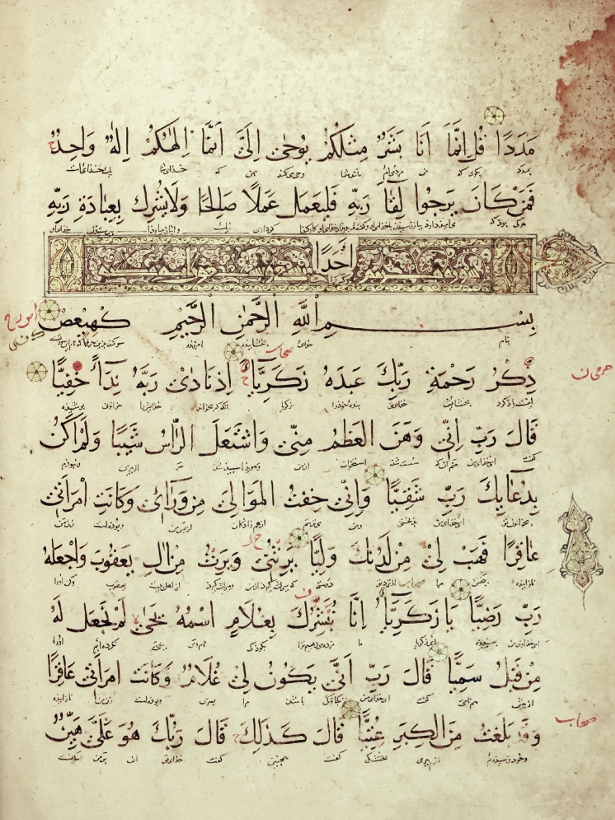
A sample page from the Qurʾān of al-Zaʿfarānī

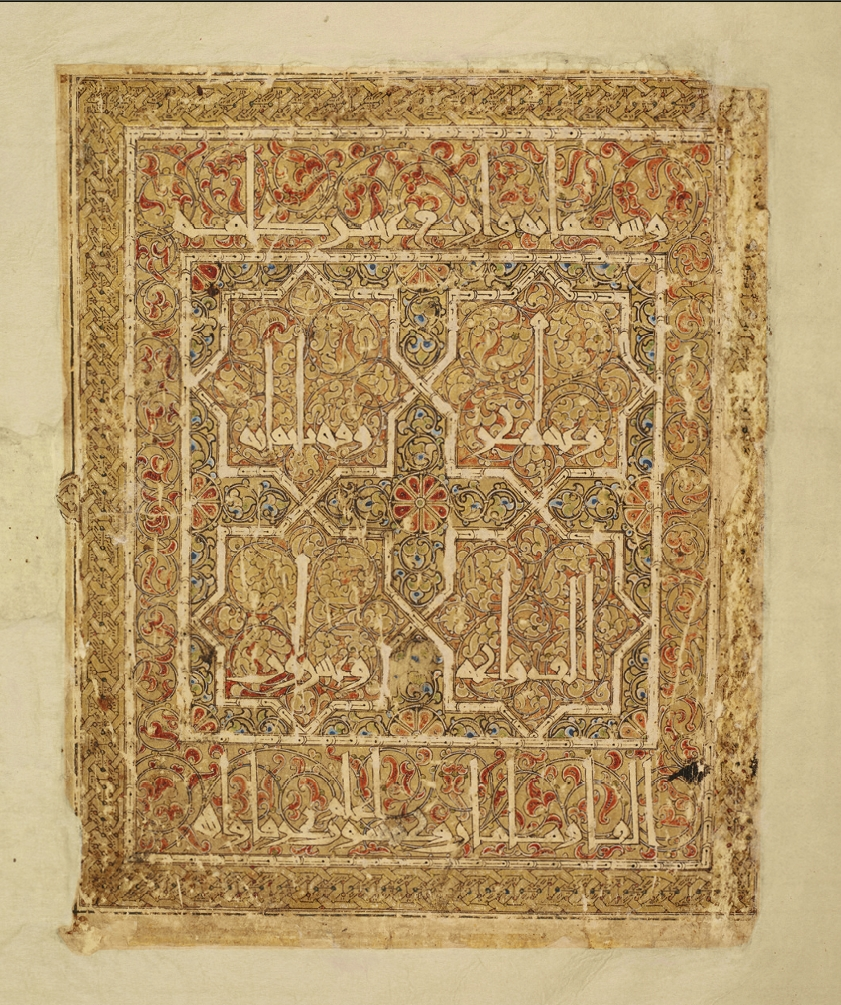
Opening frontispiece of the "Qurʾān of al-Zaʿfarānī", Riḍā ʿAbbāsī Museum manuscript, Tehran

== Comparative manuscripts ==
Two Quranic manuscripts featuring Persian translation survive from Abu 'l-Fakhr:

- The Tehran Manuscript (Reza Abbasi Museum 551): Transcribed in 546 AH, written in early archaic naskh script, with distinct and evenly spaced words, lacking a specified location of transcription (likely Rayy), and with margins devoid of variant readings (qirāʾāt).
- The Ankara Manuscript (Diyanet Organization 1248): Transcribed in 548 AH in Rayy, executed in muḥaqqaq script with conjoined letters, and containing a system of abbreviations for the names of the seven and ten Quranic readers (qurrāʾ) in the margins, alongside the virtues of the sūras recorded in Persian.
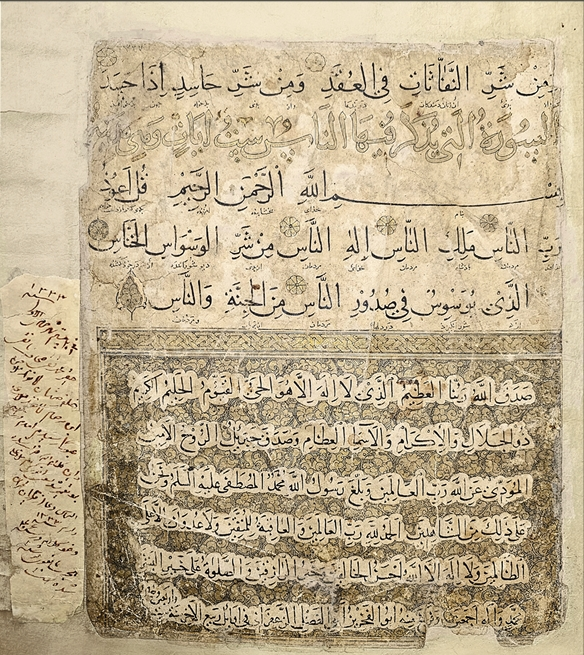
Colophon of the "Qurʾān of al-Zaʿfarānī", Riḍā ʿAbbāsī Museum manuscript, Tehran (dated Rabīʿ al-Ākhir 546 AH)

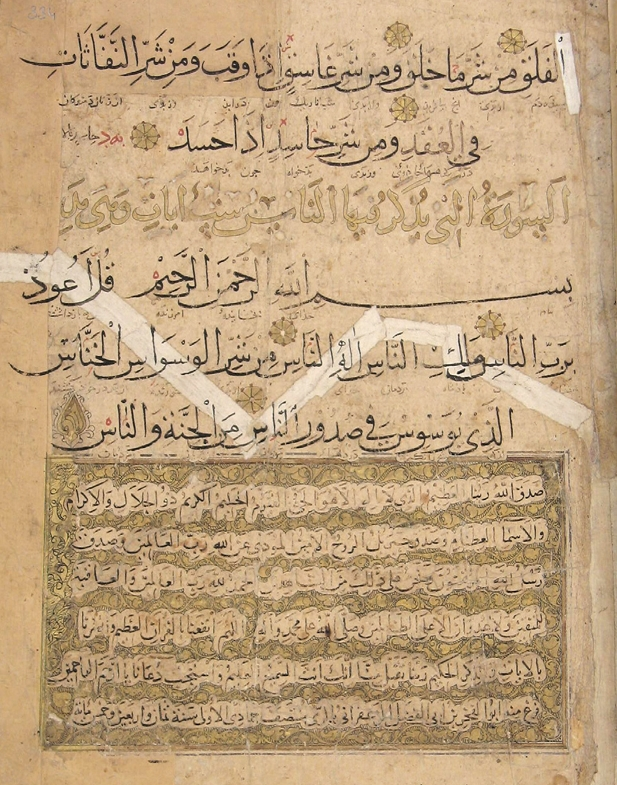
Colophon of the "Qurʾān of al-Zaʿfarānī", Diyānet Organization manuscript, Ankara (dated Jumādā al-Ūlā 548 AH, Rayy)
