= Seyyed Alireza Dana =

Iranian politician (born 1969)

- سید علیرضا دانا

Member of the Assembly of Experts
- Constituency: Fars province

Personal details
- Born: 1969 (age 56–57) Abadeh, Fars province
- Education: Qom Hawza

Seyyed Alireza Dana (born in 1969, in Abadeh city) is an Iranian Shi’a cleric, seminary and university professor, and Friday prayer leader in Abadeh city. He was elected as a representative of Fars province by winning 309,429 votes in the sixth election of the Assembly of Experts.

== Seminary and university education ==
He entered the seminary in 1984 and benefited from professors such as Tabrizi, Javadi Amoli, Hashemi Shahroudi, and Sobhani. Dana has been engaged in scientific, educational, and research activities in the seminary and is engaged in teaching and research as a lecturer at the higher levels of the Qom Seminary and a professor at the Mustafa Al-Alamiyah University. For more than a year, he was assigned by the Deputy for International Relations of the Supreme Leader's Office to carry out cultural and propaganda activities among Iranian students living in India. In addition to his seminary education, he continued his university education to the degree of PhD in pure philosophy at a university in India, where he completed a specialized course in English conversation. He also holds a master's degree in theology and a doctorate in philosophy and theology from Qom State University.

== Responsibilities and executive background ==
Seyed Alireza Dana has held several responsibilities during his years of scientific and executive activity. Including:

- Imam of Friday prayers in Abadeh
- Deputy Researcher of the Higher Institute of Fiqh and Islamic Sciences in Qom
- Director of the Department of Intellectual Sciences at "Hajj Mulla Sadeq Seminary" in Qom
- Director of "Imam Sadeq (AS) Seminary" in Abadeh

He has also been in charge of the management of Abadeh Seminary since 2002 and has also been the temporary Friday imam of this city. Currently, he is engaged in activities and services as the Friday imam of Abadeh.

== See also ==
- List of members in the Sixth Term of the Council of Experts
- 2024 Iranian legislative election
- Lotfollah Dezhkam
- Ahmad Beheshti
