= Miyanshahr, Fars =

City in Fars province, Iran

Miyanshahr Persian: میان‌شهر
- City
- Location within Iran
- Coordinates: 28°42′55″N 53°51′22″E
- Country: Iran
- Province: Fars
- County: Fasa
- District: Shibkaveh

Population (2016)
  - Total: 5,912
- Time zone: UTC+3:30 (IRST)

Miyanshahr (Persian: میان‌شهر) (Note: Formerly the village of Miyan Deh) is a city in Shibkaveh District of Fasa County, Fars province, Iran, serving as the administrative center for Miyan Deh Rural District. Miyanshahr is the 2013 merger of the villages of Miyan Deh and Abuzarabad.

== Demographics ==
=== Population ===
At the time of the 2006 National Census, Miyanshahr's population (as the total of its two constituent villages before the merger) was 6,086 in 1,388 households, when it was in Miyan Deh Rural District. The following census in 2011 counted 6,257 people in 1,680 households. The 2016 census measured the population as 5,912 people in 1,775 households, by which time the two villages had merged to form the new city of Miyanshahr.

== Notable residents ==
Ahmad Beheshti, cleric and politician
