= Qasemabad-e Sofla, Fars =

Qasemabad-e Sofla قاسم ابادسفلي
- Village
- Location within Iran
- Coordinates: 28°55′22″N 54°04′26″E
- Country: Iran
- Province: Fars
- County: Fasa
- Bakhsh: Sheshdeh and Qarah Bulaq
- Rural District: Qarah Bulaq

Population (2006)
  - Total: 1,880
- Time zone: UTC+3:30 (IRST)
  - Summer (DST): UTC+4:30 (IRDT)

Qasemabad-e Sofla (Persian: قاسم ابادسفلي, also Romanized as Qāsemābād-e Soflá; also known as Qāsemābād-e Pā’īn) is a village in Qarah Bulaq Rural District, Sheshdeh and Qarah Bulaq District, Fasa County, Fars province, Iran. At the 2006 census, its population was 1,880, in 457 families.
