= Yousef Tabatabai Nejad =

Iranian Ayatollah (born 1944)

Ayatollah; Seyyed; Seyyed Yousef Tabatabai Nejad
- سید یوسف طباطبایی‌نژاد
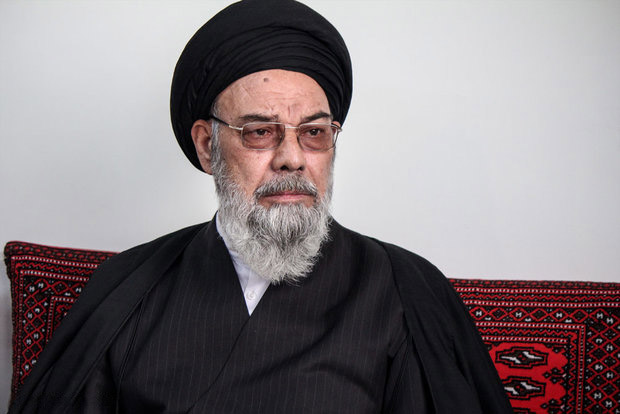
- Ayatollah Seyyed Yousef Tabatabai Nejad during an interview with Mehr News Agency in 2015.

Member of the 4th, 5th and 6th Assembly of Experts
- Incumbent
- Assumed office 20 February 2007
- Constituency: Isfahan Province

Representative of the Supreme Leader in Isfahan and Imam Jumu'ah of Isfahan
- Incumbent
- Assumed office 11 September 2002
- Appointed by: Ali Khamenei
- Preceded by: Jalal Al-Din Taheri

Personal details
- Born: 1944 (age 81–82) Ardestan, Iran
- Education: Qom Hawza

Seyyed Yousef Tabatabai Nejad (sometimes spelled as Tabatabaei-Nejad) is an Iranian Shia cleric and Friday leading prayer that represents the Isfahan Province in Iran's Assembly of Experts.

== Views ==
In 2015, he said women should be denied working in stores and offices. In 2019, he made municipality of Isfahan to deny women access to bicycles legally shutting down two city bicycle stations.

In 2016, he claimed that the act of women taking pictures of themselves in the Zayanderud river contributed to drought in said river.

He is critical of the possible changing of the supreme leader position to the council.

On October 1, 2020, while meeting with the NAJA and the Intelligence Ministry of Iran, he believes that law enforcement should make, "the life of the unveiled unsafe". This has raised concerns for repeated Acid attacks on women in Isfahan.
