= Sheshdeh =

City in Fars province, Iran

Sheshdeh Persian: ششده
- City
- Location within Iran
- Coordinates: 28°57′00″N 53°59′45″E
- Country: Iran
- Province: Fars
- County: Fasa
- District: Sheshdeh and Qarah Bolagh

Population (2016)
  - Total: 5,960
- Time zone: UTC+3:30 (IRST)

Sheshdeh (Persian: ششده) (Note: Also romanized as Shash Deh and Shesh Deh; also known as Shish Deh) is a city in, and the capital of, Sheshdeh and Qarah Bolagh District (Note: Formerly Sheshdeh District) of Fasa County, Fars province, Iran. It also serves as the administrative center for Sheshdeh Rural District.

== Demographics ==
=== Population ===
At the time of the 2006 National Census, the city's population was 5,572 in 1,283 households. The following census in 2011 counted 5,562 people in 1,497 households. The 2016 census measured the population of the city as 5,960 people in 1,778 households.
