= Qarah Bolagh, Fasa =

City in Fars province, Iran

Qarah Bolagh Persian: قره‌بلاغ
- City
- Location within Iran
- Coordinates: 28°54′11″N 54°07′52″E
- Country: Iran
- Province: Fars
- County: Fasa
- District: Sheshdeh and Qarah Bolagh

Population (2016)
  - Total: 6,772
- Time zone: UTC+3:30 (IRST)

Qarah Bolagh (Persian: قره‌بلاغ) is a city in Sheshdeh and Qarah Bolagh District (Note: Formerly Sheshdeh District) of Fasa County, Fars province, Iran, serving as the administrative center for Qarah Bolagh Rural District.

== History ==
In 2013, the villages of Hoseynabad, Beyk Inanlu, Dugan-e Olya, Dugan-e Sofla, and Jorgheh merged to form the new city of Qarah Bolagh.

== Demographics ==
=== Population ===
At the time of the 2006 National Census, Qarah Bolagh's population (as the total of its constituent villages before the merger) was 6,386 in 1,496 households. The following census in 2011 counted 6,563 people in 1,815 households. The 2016 census measured the population as 6,772 people in 1,983 households, by which time the villages had merged to form the new city of Qarah Bolagh.
