= Now Bandegan =

City in Fars province, Iran

Now Bandegan Persian: نوبندگان
- City
- Location within Iran
- Coordinates: 28°51′14″N 53°49′34″E
- Country: Iran
- Province: Fars
- County: Fasa
- District: Now Bandegan

Population (2016)
  - Total: 2,410
- Time zone: UTC+3:30 (IRST)

Now Bandegan (Persian: نوبندگان) (Note: Also romanized as Naubandagān and Now Bandegān) is a city in, and the capital of, Now Bandegan District of Fasa County, Fars province, Iran. It also serves as the administrative center for Now Bandegan Rural District.

Now Bandegan was renowned for its Zorationism and Jewish population along with traditional and contemporary medicine in the area until the start of modernization of medicine in Iran after 1900s.

== Demographics ==
=== Population ===
At the time of the 2006 National Census, the city's population was 2,933 in 766 households. The following census in 2011 counted 2,704 people in 821 households. The 2016 census measured the population of the city as 2,410 people in 823 households.
