= Zahedshahr =

City in Fars province, Iran

Zahedshahr Persian: زاهدشهر
- City
- Zahedshahr in 2011

- Location within Iran
- Coordinates: 28°44′46″N 53°48′14″E
- Country: Iran
- Province: Fars
- County: Fasa
- District: Shibkaveh

Population (2016)
  - Total: 9,719
- Time zone: UTC+3:30 (IRST)

Zahedshahr (Persian: زاهدشهر) (Note: Formerly the village of Zahedan (زاهدان), also romanized as Zāhedān; also known as Zāhidān) is a city in, and the capital of, Shibkaveh District of Fasa County, Fars province, Iran.

== Demographics ==
At the time of the 2006 National Census, the city's population was 10,038 in 2,296 households. The following census in 2011 counted 9,483 people in 2,458 households. The 2016 census measured the population of the city as 9,719 people in 2,866 households.
