= Dowlatabadi =

Dowlatabadi is a last name. Notable people with this last name include:

- Aziz Dowlatabadi (1922–2009), Iranian poet
- Mahmoud Dowlatabadi (born 1940), Iranian writer and actor
- Parvin Dowlatabadi (1924–2008), Iranian children's writer
- Sediqeh Dowlatabadi (1882–1961), Iranian feminist activist and journalist
- Zahra Dowlatabadi (born 1962), Iranian-American filmmaker

== See also ==
- Dowlatabad (disambiguation)
