= Dowlatabad, Nahavand =

Dowlatabad دولت اباد
- Village
- Location within Iran
- Coordinates: 34°13′41″N 48°05′15″E
- Country: Iran
- Province: Hamadan
- County: Nahavand
- Bakhsh: Khezel
- Rural District: Solgi

Population (2006)
  - Total: 32
- Time zone: UTC+3:30 (IRST)
  - Summer (DST): UTC+4:30 (IRDT)

Dowlatabad (Persian: دولت اباد, also Romanized as Dowlatābād; also known as Dowlafābād) is a village in Solgi Rural District, Khezel District, Nahavand County, Hamadan Province, Iran. At the 2006 census, its population was 32, in 8 families.
