= Hadiabad, Hamadan =

Hadiabad هادي اباد
- Village
- Location within Iran
- Coordinates: 34°17′27″N 48°07′38″E
- Country: Iran
- Province: Hamadan
- County: Nahavand
- Bakhsh: Khezel
- Rural District: Solgi

Population (2006)
  - Total: 352
- Time zone: UTC+3:30 (IRST)
  - Summer (DST): UTC+4:30 (IRDT)

Hadiabad (Persian: هادي اباد, also Romanized as Hādīābād; also known as Hārīābād) is a village in Solgi Rural District, Khezel District, Nahavand County, Hamadan Province, Iran. At the 2006 census, its population was 352, in 88 families.
