= Dowlatabad-e Seh =

Dowlatabad-e Seh دولت اباد3
- Village
- Location within Iran
- Coordinates: 29°15′00″N 56°27′10″E
- Country: Iran
- Province: Kerman
- County: Baft
- Bakhsh: Central
- Rural District: Fathabad

Population (2006)
  - Total: 17
- Time zone: UTC+3:30 (IRST)
  - Summer (DST): UTC+4:30 (IRDT)

Dowlatabad-e Seh (Persian: دولت اباد3, also Romanized as Dowlatābād-e Seh; also known as Dowlatābād) is a village in Fathabad Rural District, in the Central District of Baft County, Kerman Province, Iran. At the 2006 census, its population was 17, in 4 families.
