= Dowlatabad-e Olya =

Dowlatabad-e Olya دولتابادعليا
- Village
- Location within Iran
- Coordinates: 34°13′12″N 46°54′42″E
- Country: Iran
- Province: Kermanshah
- County: Kermanshah
- Bakhsh: Mahidasht
- Rural District: Mahidasht

Population (2006)
  - Total: 139
- Time zone: UTC+3:30 (IRST)
  - Summer (DST): UTC+4:30 (IRDT)

Dowlatabad-e Olya (Persian: دولتابادعليا, also Romanized as Dowlatābād-e ‘Olyā; also known as Daulatābād and Dowlatābād) is a village in Mahidasht Rural District, Mahidasht District, Kermanshah County, Kermanshah Province, Iran. At the 2006 census, its population was 139, in 26 families.
