= Abdullah Keyvani Hafeshjani =

Iranian Shia cleric (born 1965)

Ayatollah Abdullah Keyvani Hafeshjani

Member of the Assembly of Experts
- Incumbent
- Assumed office 21 May 2024
- Constituency: Chaharmahal and Bakhtiari province
- Majority: 217,697

Personal details
- Born: 1965 (age 60–61) Hafeshjan, Chaharmahal and Bakhtiari province, Iran

Abdullah Keyvani Hafeshjani (born 1965 in Hafeshjan) is an Iranian Shia cleric and representative of the people of Chaharmahal and Bakhtiari Province in the Assembly of Experts of the Supreme Leader of Iran. He won 217,000 votes in the elections, to represent Chaharmahal and Bakhtiari Province in the Assembly of Experts of the Supreme Leader.

== Life and education ==
Abdullah Kayvani was born in 1965 in Hafeshjan, a part of Shahrekord County. He completed his primary education there and was sent to the fronts with the start of the Iran-Iraq War and participated in the operations of Fath al-Mubin, Muharram and Khyber, where he eventually suffered a leg injury in the Talaiyeh region after the Khyber operation. After the war, he went to a seminary and continued his non-secular studies simultaneously with his seminary studies. His university studies continued until he received a doctorate in Islamic mysticism from Azad University (Sciences and Research Branch). Kayvani, in addition to teaching jurisprudence (Makasib) and principles (Kifayah), philosophy (Nihayyah al-Hikmah) and Tafsir al-Mizan at the Qom Seminary, has been teaching undergraduate courses in philosophy and Quranic sciences at the university since 2011. Among his professors during his studies were Abdullah Javadi Amoli, Seyyed Ahmad Khatami, Ahmad Abedi and Muhandisi. In addition to teaching at the university and in the field of cultural propaganda and activities nationwide, he has written various articles on the subject of philosophy, mysticism, and theology that have been published in specialized magazines.

== See also ==
- List of ayatollahs
