= Dowlatabad-e Kaffeh =

Dowlatabad-e Kaffeh دولت ابادكفه
- Village
- Location within Iran
- Coordinates: 29°24′49″N 55°34′02″E
- Country: Iran
- Province: Kerman
- County: Sirjan
- Bakhsh: Central
- Rural District: Sharifabad

Population (2006)
  - Total: 136
- Time zone: UTC+3:30 (IRST)
  - Summer (DST): UTC+4:30 (IRDT)

Dowlatabad-e Kaffeh (Persian: دولت ابادكفه, also Romanized as Dowlatābād-e Kaffeh; also known as Dowlatābād) is a village in Sharifabad Rural District, in the Central District of Sirjan County, Kerman Province, Iran. At the 2006 census, its population was 136, in 40 families.
