= Dowlatabad, Kerman =

Village in Kerman, Iran

Dowlatabad دولت اباد
- Village
- Location within Iran
- Coordinates: 30°13′53″N 56°36′28″E
- Country: Iran
- Province: Kerman
- County: Kerman
- Bakhsh: Central
- Rural District: Baghin

Population (2006)
  - Total: 65
- Time zone: UTC+3:30 (IRST)
  - Summer (DST): UTC+4:30 (IRDT)

Dowlatabad (Persian: دولت اباد, also Romanized as Dowlatābād; also known as Daulatābād) is a village in Baghin Rural District, in the Central District of Kerman County, Kerman Province, Iran. At the 2006 census, its population was 65, in 14 families.
