= Kariz Sukhteh-ye Dowlatabad =

Kariz Sukhteh-ye Dowlatabad كاريزسوخته دولت اباد
- Village
- Location within Iran
- Coordinates: 35°29′45″N 60°02′53″E
- Country: Iran
- Province: Razavi Khorasan
- County: Fariman
- Bakhsh: Qalandarabad
- Rural District: Qalandarabad

Population (2006)
  - Total: 183
- Time zone: UTC+3:30 (IRST)
  - Summer (DST): UTC+4:30 (IRDT)

Kariz Sukhteh-ye Dowlatabad (Persian: كاريزسوخته دولت اباد, also Romanized as Kārīz Sūkhteh-ye Dowlatābād; also known as Kārīz Sūkhteh, Dowlatābād, and Kārīz Sūkhtah) is a village in Qalandarabad Rural District, Qalandarabad District, Fariman County, Razavi Khorasan Province, Iran. At the 2006 census, its population was 183, in 45 families.
