= Dowlatabad-e Amanat =

Dowlatabad-e Amanat دولت ابادامانت
- Village
- Country: Iran
- Province: Yazd
- County: Yazd
- Bakhsh: Central
- Rural District: Fahraj

Population (2006)
  - Total: 13
- Time zone: UTC+3:30 (IRST)
  - Summer (DST): UTC+4:30 (IRDT)

Dowlatabad-e Amanat (Persian: دولت ابادامانت, also Romanized as Dowlatābād-e Āmānat) is a village in Fahraj Rural District, in the Central District of Yazd County, Yazd Province, Iran. At the 2006 census, its population was 13, in 4 families.
