= Dowlatabad, Kashan =

Dowlatabad دولت اباد
- Village
- Location within Iran
- Coordinates: 33°59′05″N 51°09′48″E
- Country: Iran
- Province: Isfahan
- County: Kashan
- Bakhsh: Neyasar
- Rural District: Neyasar

Population (2006)
  - Total: 52
- Time zone: UTC+3:30 (IRST)
  - Summer (DST): UTC+4:30 (IRDT)

Dowlatabad (Persian: دولت اباد, also Romanized as Dowlatābād) is a village in Neyasar Rural District, Neyasar District, Kashan County, Isfahan Province, Iran. At the 2006 census, its population was 52, in 15 families.
