= Dowlatabad, Kenareh =

Dowlatabad دولت اباد
- Village
- Location within Iran
- Coordinates: 29°50′16″N 52°49′17″E
- Country: Iran
- Province: Fars
- County: Marvdasht
- Bakhsh: Central
- Rural District: Kenareh

Population (2006)
  - Total: 1,247
- Time zone: UTC+3:30 (IRST)
  - Summer (DST): UTC+4:30 (IRDT)

Dowlatabad (Persian: دولت اباد, also Romanized as Dowlatābād; also known as Dowlatābād-e Marvdasht and Dowlat Abad Marvdasht) is a village in Kenareh Rural District, in the Central District of Marvdasht County, Fars province, Iran. At the 2006 census, its population was 1,247, in 298 families.
