= Seyyed Baqer Seyyedi Bonabi =

Iranian politician (born 1967)

- سید باقر سیدی بنابی
- Title: Member of the Assembly of Experts, 6th term

Personal life
- Born: 1967 Bonab, Iran
- Era: Modern era
- Region: Iran

Religious life
- Religion: Shia Islam
- Sect: Twelver

Seyyed Baqer Seyyedi Bonabi

Seyyed Baqer Seyyedi Bonabi was born in 1967 in the city of Bonab, Iran, and is a member of the Assembly of Experts. He has been teaching at the Bonab Seminary since 1995. In addition to teaching at the seminary, he also taught jurisprudence, principles, theology, philosophy, and the basics of Islamic law at the university. During this time, in addition to judging, guiding, and advising hundreds of seminary and university theses, he was also responsible for the Islamic Culture Office of the Azad University of Bonab for 14 years. he also participated in the battles of truth against falsehood for 8 months during the Holy Defense.

== Biography ==
Seyyed Baqir Seyidi Bonabi was born in the city of Bonab in February 1967. He continued his classical education until the cycle in his hometown and in 1982, at the same time as the first admission period of the Vali-e-Asr School of Bonab, he entered the seminary of this city and after completing the first level in 1985, he left for Qom to continue his studies. Seyyed Bonabi studied at the seminary of Qom under the guidance of Wajdani, Payani, Etemadi and Sotoudeh and then attended the course of Fazel Lankarani (for 2 years), the course of Fiqh of Javad Tabrizi (for 6 years) and a full course of Usul of Jafar Sobhani (for 7 years) and also benefited from the courses of interpretation and philosophy of Javadi Amoli. Seyyed was accepted into the first specialized course of Islamic theology at the Imam Sadeq Institute in 1991 and completed the specialized course of theology over 4 years. He also defended his thesis entitled The Infallibility of the Prophets in Islamic Theology in 2003 and succeeded in obtaining a level four degree (PhD).

== Teachers ==
Among his known teachers are as follows:

- Vujdani
- Payani
- Etemadi
- Sotoudeh
- Fazel Lankarani
- Javad Tabrizi
- Jafar Sobhani
- Javadi Amoli

== Compilations ==
Among his known compilations are:

- The Infallibility of Prophets and Imams in Islamic Theology
- Inheritance and Solving Its Problems
- Green Thoughts (A Theological and Philosophical Study of Imam Reza's Arguments (PBUH))
- Debates on Principles, Vol. 1, 2, and 3
- A Commentary on the Philosophical Verses of Mulla Hadi Sabzevari
- Explanation and Criticism of Twenty of the Jurisprudential Rules of the Late Bojnourdi
- Cultural Engineering

== Records and responsibilities ==
- Temporary Friday Imam of Bonab
- Manager of the specialized center of Hazrat Vali Asr
- Head of the Islamic Culture Office of the Azad University of Bonab.
- Member of the Assembly of Experts
