= Mohammad Reza Fallah Tafti =

Iranian Ayatollah

- محمدرضا فلاح تفتی
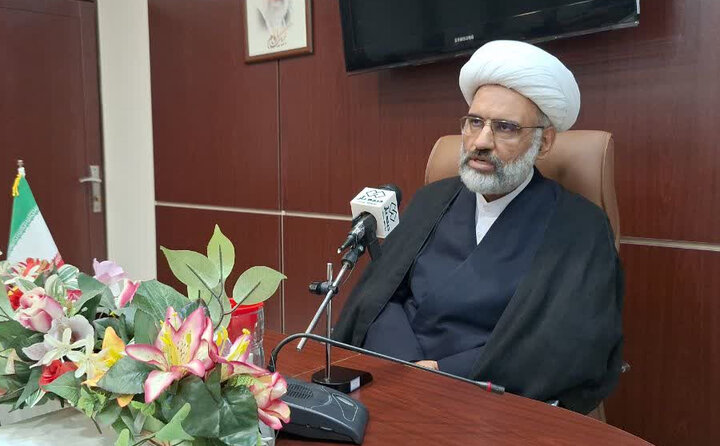

Member of Assembly of Experts
- Incumbent
- Assumed office 21 May 2024
- Constituency: Alborz Province

Personal details
- Born: 1980 (age 45–46) Qom, Iran
- Education: Qom Hawza and University of Religions and Denominations

Mohammad Reza Fallah Tafti (Persian: محمدرضا فلاح تفتی) (born in 1980 in Qom) is a member of the sixth term of the Assembly of Experts from Alborz Province, Iran.

== Life ==
Mohammad Reza Fallah Tafti was born in Qom in 1980. After completing his high school diploma in 1997, he entered the Qom Seminary and completed his preparatory and advanced courses. He has a history of attending courses taught by Jafar Sobhani and Nasser Makarem Shirazi. Fallah Tafti graduated with a master's degree in Abrahamic religions in 1993 from the University of Religions and Denominations, and also graduated with a doctorate in jurisprudence and fundamentals of Islamic law in 1998 from the University of Tehran.

== Assembly of Experts ==
Mohammad Reza Fallah Tafti was elected to the Assembly of Experts in the sixth term of the Assembly of Experts from the Alborz province constituency as a representative of the people of Alborz province in the elections, among the three candidates approved to occupy the two seats of Alborz province in the Assembly of Experts, by receiving 192,559 votes. Fallah Tafti is a member of the Political, Social, and Cultural Commission and a member of the Commission for the Protection of the Authority of the Jurisprudence in the Assembly of Experts.

== Background ==
Fallah Tafti's professional background encompasses collaboration with various esteemed organizations, including the Supreme Council for the Cultural Revolution, the Supreme National Defense University, the Khatam al-Awsiya Headquarters, the World Assembly of Ahl al-Bayt, the Islamic Thought Council, the Islamic Propaganda Office, the Religious Studies Institute, the Research Institute for Contemporary Jurisprudence Studies, the Bright Future Institute, the Institute for Narrating the Lives of the Martyrs, the World Assembly of Shia Studies, the Scientific and Cultural Center for Insight, and the Foundation for the Preservation of the Works and Values of the Sacred Defense. Additionally, he serves on the editorial boards of the quarterly publication Farhang Pouya, the monthly Etesam, and the monthly Rasa'il. He previously held the position of Persian language director for the WikiShia website and is currently the content director and a member of the policy council for this platform.

=== Missionary background ===
Since 2002, Fallah Tafti has engaged in extensive travel across various regions of the country, including the provinces of Kermanshah, Kurdistan, Kohkiluyeh and Boyer Ahmad, Chahar Mahal and Bakhtiari, and Hormozgan. During the months of Muharram, Safar, and Ramadan, he delivered lectures and conducted missionary activities in numerous villages and cities.

Additionally, he serves as a cleric for the caravan of the Holy Shrines and Syria, and he is a narrator for the caravans of the Path of the Light, which operate in the southwestern and western regions.
