= Dowlatabad, Zarand =

Dowlatabad دولت اباد
- Village
- Location within Iran
- Coordinates: 30°46′14″N 56°30′47″E
- Country: Iran
- Province: Kerman
- County: Zarand
- Bakhsh: Central
- Rural District: Mohammadabad

Population (2006)
  - Total: 759
- Time zone: UTC+3:30 (IRST)
  - Summer (DST): UTC+4:30 (IRDT)

Dowlatabad (Persian: دولت اباد, also Romanized as Dowlatābād; also known as Dowlat Abad Hoomeh Zarand) is a village in Mohammadabad Rural District, in the Central District of Zarand County, Kerman Province, Iran. At the 2006 census, its population was 759, in 191 families.
