= Dowlatabad-e Sofla =

Dowlatabad-e Sofla دولتابادسفلي
- Village
- Location within Iran
- Coordinates: 34°12′00″N 46°55′00″E
- Country: Iran
- Province: Kermanshah
- County: Kermanshah
- Bakhsh: Mahidasht
- Rural District: Mahidasht

Population (2006)
  - Total: 100
- Time zone: UTC+3:30 (IRST)
  - Summer (DST): UTC+4:30 (IRDT)

Dowlatabad-e Sofla (Persian: دولتابادسفلي, also Romanized as Dowlatābād-e Soflá) is a village in Mahidasht Rural District, Mahidasht District, Kermanshah County, Kermanshah Province, Iran. At the 2006 census, its population was 100, in 20 families.
