= Dowlatabad, Bukan =

Dowlatabad دولت اباد
- Village
- Country: Iran
- Province: West Azerbaijan
- County: Bukan
- Bakhsh: Central
- Rural District: Il Teymur

Population (2006)
  - Total: 118
- Time zone: UTC+3:30 (IRST)
  - Summer (DST): UTC+4:30 (IRDT)

Dowlatabad (Persian: دولت اباد, also Romanized as Dowlatābād) is a village in Il Teymur Rural District, in the Central District of Bukan County, located in West Azerbaijan Province, Iran. At the 2006 census, its population was 118, residing in 22 families.
