= Dowlatabad, Beyza =

Dowlatabad دولتاباد
- Village
- Country: Iran
- Province: Fars
- County: Sepidan
- Bakhsh: Beyza
- Rural District: Kushk-e Hezar

Population (2006)
  - Total: 238
- Time zone: UTC+3:30 (IRST)
  - Summer (DST): UTC+4:30 (IRDT)

Dowlatabad (Persian: دولتاباد, also Romanized as Dowlatābād) is a village in Kushk-e Hezar Rural District, Beyza District, Sepidan County, Fars province, Iran. At the 2006 census, its population was 238, in 56 families.
