= Dowlatabad, Darab =

Dowlatabad دولت اباد
- Village
- Location within Iran
- Coordinates: 28°40′20″N 54°18′54″E
- Country: Iran
- Province: Fars
- County: Darab
- Bakhsh: Central
- Rural District: Nasrovan

Population (2006)
  - Total: 1,069
- Time zone: UTC+3:30 (IRST)
  - Summer (DST): UTC+4:30 (IRDT)

Dowlatabad (Persian: دولت اباد, also Romanized as Dowlatābād; also known as Daulalābād and Daulatābad) is a village in Nasrovan Rural District, in the Central District of Darab County, Fars province, Iran. At the 2006 census, its population was 1,069, in 242 families.
