= Dowlatabad, Bijar =

Dowlatabad دولت آباد
- Village
- Location within Iran
- Coordinates: 35°48′06″N 47°41′37″E
- Country: Iran
- Province: Kurdistan
- County: Bijar
- Bakhsh: Central
- Rural District: Howmeh

Population (2006)
  - Total: 106
- Time zone: UTC+3:30 (IRST)
  - Summer (DST): UTC+4:30 (IRDT)

Dowlatabad (Persian: دولت آباد, also Romanized as Dowlatābād; also known as Daulatābād and Qalālū Khān) is a village in Howmeh Rural District, in the Central District of Bijar County, Kurdistan Province, Iran. At the 2006 census, its population was 106, in 29 families. The village is populated by Kurds.
