= Karuz, Kurdistan =

Karuz كروز
- Village
- Location within Iran
- Coordinates: 36°22′36″N 46°51′25″E
- Country: Iran
- Province: Kurdistan
- County: Saqqez
- Bakhsh: Ziviyeh
- Rural District: Gol Tappeh

Population (2006)
  - Total: 154
- Time zone: UTC+3:30 (IRST)
  - Summer (DST): UTC+4:30 (IRDT)

Karuz (Persian: كروز, also Romanized as Karūz; also known as Dowlatābād and Karzū) is a village in Gol Tappeh Rural District, Ziviyeh District, Saqqez County, Kurdistan Province, Iran. At the 2006 census, its population was 154, in 27 families. The village is populated by Kurds.
