= Dowlatabad Rural District =

Dowlatabad Rural District (Persian: دهستان دولت آباد) may refer to:

- Dowlatabad Rural District (Namin County), Ardabil province
- Dowlatabad Rural District (Marand County), East Azerbaijan province
- Dowlatabad Rural District (Jiroft County), Kerman province
- Dowlatabad Rural District (Ravansar County), Kermanshah province
- Dowlatabad Rural District (Abhar County), Zanjan province
