= Dowlatabad, Fahraj =

Dowlatabad دولتاباد
- Village
- Location within Iran
- Coordinates: 28°54′41″N 58°52′42″E
- Country: Iran
- Province: Kerman
- County: Fahraj
- Bakhsh: Central
- Rural District: Fahraj

Population (2006)
  - Total: 100
- Time zone: UTC+3:30 (IRST)
  - Summer (DST): UTC+4:30 (IRDT)

Dowlatabad (Persian: دولتاباد, also Romanized as Dowlatābād) is a village in Fahraj Rural District, in the Central District of Fahraj County, Kerman Province, Iran. At the 2006 census, its population was 100, in 21 families.
