= Hossein Radaei =

Iranian Ayatollah

- حسین ردائی
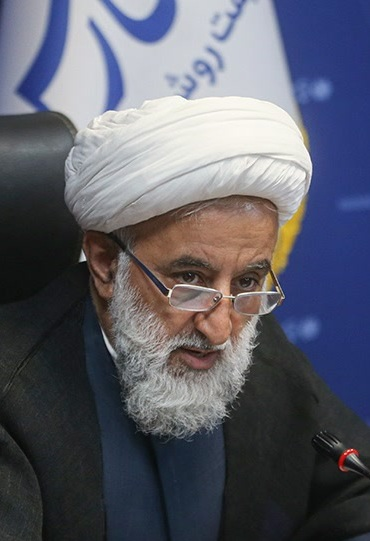

Member of Assembly of Experts
- Incumbent
- Assumed office 21 May 2024
- Constituency: Alborz Province

Personal details
- Born: 1968 (age 57–58) Tonekabon, Iran
- Education: Qom Hawza

Hossein Radaei (Persian: حسین ردائی; born 1968) is a member of the sixth term of the Assembly of Experts from Alborz Province, Iran.

== Life ==
Radaei was born in Tonekabon. He began his seminary studies in 1983 at Shahid Beheshti Seminary in Nowshahr and moved to Qom in 1984. He completed his preliminary studies and the level courses under the supervision of esteemed scholars such as Ayatollahs Ostadi, Ghadiri, Etemadi, and Payani. He studied jurisprudence and Principles of Islamic jurisprudence with prominent figures including the late Ayatollah Salehi Mazandarani, Nouri Hamadani, Fazel Lankarani, Wahid Khorasani, and Tabrizi. He also took Islamic philosophy from Ayatollahs Javadi Amoli, Ansari Shirazi, and part of the Astronomy from Ayatollah Hassanzadeh Amoli.

== Academic and university position ==
He teaching at both the seminary and university levels, he has engaged in research and writing.

Radaei is currently a faculty member at Shahed University and has teaching experience at universities such as University of Tehran, Imam Sadiq University, University of Judicial Sciences and Administrative Services, and the Islamic Sciences Department of Alborz Medical Sciences University.

== Bibliography ==
- Bidayat al-Hikmah" by the late Allameh Tabatabai
- Strategies for social reforms in a religious government
- Editing and translating along with commentary on "Nahj-al feṣāḥa"
- A jurisprudential-exegetical treatise on the topic of buying and selling blood with its various branches.
