= Dowlatabad, Tabas =

Dowlatabad دولتاباد
- Village
- Location within Iran
- Coordinates: 33°36′13″N 56°53′42″E
- Country: Iran
- Province: South Khorasan
- County: Tabas
- Bakhsh: Central
- Rural District: Golshan

Population (2006)
  - Total: 56
- Time zone: UTC+3:30 (IRST)
  - Summer (DST): UTC+4:30 (IRDT)

Dowlatabad (Persian: دولتاباد, also Romanized as Dowlatābād; also known as Daulatābād and Dowlatābād Ḩūmeh) is a village in Golshan Rural District, in the Central District of Tabas County, South Khorasan Province, Iran. At the 2006 census, its population was 56, in 14 families.
