= Dowlatabad, Sepidan =

Dowlatabad دولت آباد
- Village
- Location within Iran
- Coordinates: 30°20′47″N 51°49′40″E
- Country: Iran
- Province: Fars
- County: Sepidan
- Bakhsh: Central
- Rural District: Khafri

Population (2006)
  - Total: 54
- Time zone: UTC+3:30 (IRST)
  - Summer (DST): UTC+4:30 (IRDT)

Dowlatabad (Persian: دولت آباد, also Romanized as Dowlatābād; also known as Dokhtar Kalūn) is a village in Khafri Rural District, in the Central District of Sepidan County, Fars province, Iran. At the 2006 census, its population was 54, in 14 families.
