= Hadiabad, Darab =

Hadiabad هادي اباد
- Village
- Location within Iran
- Coordinates: 28°47′10″N 54°18′27″E
- Country: Iran
- Province: Fars
- County: Darab
- Bakhsh: Central
- Rural District: Paskhan

Population (2006)
  - Total: 444
- Time zone: UTC+3:30 (IRST)
  - Summer (DST): UTC+4:30 (IRDT)

Hadiabad (Persian: هادي اباد, also Romanized as Hādīābād) is a village in Paskhan Rural District, in the Central District of Darab County, Fars province, Iran. At the 2006 census, its population was 444, in 106 families.
