= Dowlatabad, North Khorasan =

Dowlatabad دولتاباد
- Village
- Location within Iran
- Coordinates: 36°57′43″N 57°32′41″E
- Country: Iran
- Province: North Khorasan
- County: Esfarayen
- Bakhsh: Central
- Rural District: Azari

Population (2006)
  - Total: 316
- Time zone: UTC+3:30 (IRST)
  - Summer (DST): UTC+4:30 (IRDT)

Dowlatabad (Persian: دولتاباد, also Romanized as Dowlatābād) is a village in Azari Rural District, in the Central District of Esfarayen County, North Khorasan Province, Iran. At the 2006 census, its population was 316, in 66 families.
