= Dowlatabad, Shiraz =

Village in Fars, Iran

Dowlatabad دولت اباد
- Village
- Location within Iran
- Coordinates: 29°41′49″N 52°58′18″E
- Country: Iran
- Province: Fars
- County: Shiraz
- Bakhsh: Zarqan
- Rural District: Band-e Amir

Population (2006)
  - Total: 221
- Time zone: UTC+3:30 (IRST)
  - Summer (DST): UTC+4:30 (IRDT)

Dowlatabad (Persian: دولت اباد, also Romanized as Dowlatābād; also known as Dowlatābād-e Korbāl and Dowlatabad Korbal) is a village in Band-e Amir Rural District, Zarqan District, Shiraz County, Fars province, Iran. At the 2006 census, its population was 221, in 59 families.
