= Dowlatabad, Sanandaj =

Village in Kurdistan, Iran

Dowlatabad دولت آباد
- Village
- Location within Iran
- Coordinates: 35°18′14″N 47°07′03″E
- Country: Iran
- Province: Kurdistan
- County: Sanandaj
- Bakhsh: Central
- Rural District: Howmeh

Population (2006)
  - Total: 753
- Time zone: UTC+3:30 (IRST)
  - Summer (DST): UTC+4:30 (IRDT)

Dowlatabad (Persian: دولت آباد, also Romanized as Dowlatābād; also known as Dowlatābād-e Karkareh, Dowlatābād-e Khorkoreh, Dowlatābād-e Kūrkūreh, Dowlatābād Kūrkūreh, Khor Khowreh, Khor Kurreh, and Khvor Khvoreh) is a village in Howmeh Rural District, in the Central District of Sanandaj County, Kurdistan Province, Iran. At the 2006 census, its population was 753, in 169 families. The village is populated by Kurds.
