= Dowlatabad, Narmashir =

Dowlatabad دولت اباد
- Village
- Location within Iran
- Coordinates: 28°56′15″N 58°42′01″E
- Country: Iran
- Province: Kerman
- County: Narmashir
- Bakhsh: Central
- Rural District: Azizabad

Population (2006)
  - Total: 542
- Time zone: UTC+3:30 (IRST)
  - Summer (DST): UTC+4:30 (IRDT)

Dowlatabad (Persian: دولت اباد, also Romanized as Dowlatābād; also known as Dowlatābād-e ‘Azīzābād) is a village in Azizabad Rural District, in the Central District of Narmashir County, Kerman Province, Iran. At the 2006 census, its population was 542, in 139 families.
