= Dowlatabad, Hamadan =

Dowlatabad دولت اباد
- Village
- Location within Iran
- Coordinates: 34°39′41″N 49°05′02″E
- Country: Iran
- Province: Hamadan
- County: Hamadan
- Bakhsh: Shara
- Rural District: Shur Dasht

Population (2006)
  - Total: 66
- Time zone: UTC+3:30 (IRST)
  - Summer (DST): UTC+4:30 (IRDT)

Dowlatabad (Persian: دولت اباد, also Romanized as Dowlatābād; also known as Daulatābād) is a village in Shur Dasht Rural District, Shara District, Hamadan County, Hamadan Province, Iran. At the 2006 census, its population was 66, in 18 families.
