= Dowlatabad, Negar =

Dowlatabad دولت اباد
- Village
- Location within Iran
- Coordinates: 29°50′32″N 56°58′17″E
- Country: Iran
- Province: Kerman
- County: Bardsir
- Bakhsh: Central
- Rural District: Negar

Population (2006)
  - Total: 148
- Time zone: UTC+3:30 (IRST)
  - Summer (DST): UTC+4:30 (IRDT)

Dowlatabad (Persian: دولت اباد, also Romanized as Dowlatābād; also known as Dowlarābād and Dowlatābād-e Bahrāmjerd) is a village in Negar Rural District, in the Central District of Bardsir County, Kerman Province, Iran. At the 2006 census, its population was 148, in 35 families.
