= Yadollah Safari =

Iranian Politician (born 1967)

- یدالله صفری

Member of Assembly of Experts
- Constituency: Ardabil

Personal details
- Born: 1967 (age 57–58) Ardabil, Iran

Yadollah Safari (born 1967) is a member of Assembly of Experts of the Leader. He was elected to the Assembly of Experts of the Leader by winning 200,630 votes as the representative of the people of Ardabil province in this assembly for an eight-year term.

Safari entered the Ardabil Seminary in 1983 and studied there under scholars such as Moravej, Hatami, and Mirdamad. He went to the Qom Seminary in 1989 to continue his studies and studied jurisprudence and principles under scholars such as Payani, Nekonam, Mohaqiq, and Etemadi. He participated in Makarem Shirazi's external jurisprudence course for 4 years and received the level of the fourth seminary by writing a seminary thesis.

Yadollah Safari was also accepted into the specialty of philosophy and theology at the "Imam Sadiq Institute" and was recognized as a prominent researcher at that institute. After completing level four (Hawza), which is the last academic level of the Hawza, Safari was appointed as the Friday Imam of Germi County at the request of the regional scholars and worked in this position for about 26 years. Works: Such as Explanation of the Sermon of the Pious in Nahjul-Balagha, Prayer; The Reformer and the Ascension in the Abode, 25 Ethical Articles, the book "Virtues and Vices of Morality", the book "The Role of Justice in the Field of Management", the book "Sermons from the Quran", the book "Names of the Day of Judgment in the Quran" and the verses of the rulings (marriage and the reasons for its dissolution)
