= Seyyed Mohammad Ali Modarresi Tabatabaei =

Seyyed Mohammad Ali Modarresi Tabatabaei; known as Modarresi Yazdi (born 1953, Yazd), is an Iranian Shia cleric, who was elected as a representative of Fars Province in the sixth session of the Assembly of Experts. He is the brother of Seyyed Mohammad Reza Modarresi Yazdi, a member of the Guardian Council of the Islamic Revolution and a representative of the Assembly of Experts from Khorasan Razavi Province. He entered the seminary in his youth and studied the books from the introduction to the explanation of theology under the known professors of the time, especially his father, the late Seyyed Javad Modarresi. Then he migrated to Qom to continue his education and learned the remaining level subjects from the elders of the seminary at that time.

== Biography ==
Seyyed Muhammad Ali Modarresi Tabatabaei Yazdi was born in 1336 AH in a family of scholars and leaders who had long been known for their intelligence, knowledge, and ijtihad. His father and ancestors were generally prominent/known scholars. His father, Seyyed Javad Modarresi Yazdi, who was a famous scholar and scientist of Yazd, served the Islamic community and the people of his homeland for many years.

== Teachers ==
Among his known teachers are as follows:

- Javadi Amoli
- Mirza Javad Tabrizi
- Morteza Haeri
- Shahid Motahari

== Compilations ==
Among his known compilations are:

- Superior Istikharah
- Listening to Sufism and Rumi
- Our Western Materialistic Civilization
- Forty Authentic Hadiths
- Inflation and the Issue of Khums
- Obligations in Bank Loan Contracts
- Population Control from the Perspective of Jurisprudence
- The Condition of Supreme Justice in the Leader
- Insufficiency of Good Appearance in Ensuring Justice of the Islamic Ruler
- The Place of People's Satisfaction in the Political Philosophy of Islam
- The Rule of No Obscurity (the Necessity of Direct Communication of the Islamic Ruler with the People)
- Discovery and Intuition in Sufism and Sufism
- Discussions in Artificial Intelligence
- Person-Centered System or System-Centered System (Political Philosophy)
- Defects Causing the Annulment of Marriage

== Records and responsibilities ==
- Membership in the Scientific Council of Contemporary Jurisprudence
- Head of the Research Institute of the Higher School of Jurisprudence and Islamic Sciences
- Scientific participation in the Research Center of the Islamic Consultative Assembly
- Membership in the Three-member Council for the Evaluation of Foreign Teachers in the Cities
- Membership in the Board of Examiners of the Supreme Leader’s Experts’ Assembly
- Membership in the Jurisprudential Consultative Assembly of the Guardian Council
