= Dowlatabad, Neyriz =

Dowlatabad دولت اباد
- Village
- Location within Iran
- Coordinates: 29°17′09″N 54°14′13″E
- Country: Iran
- Province: Fars
- County: Neyriz
- Bakhsh: Central
- Rural District: Rostaq

Population (2006)
  - Total: 180
- Time zone: UTC+3:30 (IRST)
  - Summer (DST): UTC+4:30 (IRDT)

Dowlatabad (Persian: دولت اباد, also Romanized as Dowlatābād; also known as Dowlatābād-e Yek) is a village in Rostaq Rural District, in the Central District of Neyriz County, Fars province, Iran. At the 2006 census, its population was 180, in 42 families.
