= Dowlatabad, Firuzeh =

Dowlatabad دولتاباد
- Village
- Location within Iran
- Coordinates: 36°13′33″N 58°44′31″E
- Country: Iran
- Province: Razavi Khorasan
- County: Nishapur
- Bakhsh: Central
- Rural District: Mazul

Population (2011)
  - Total: 415
- Time zone: UTC+3:30 (IRST)
  - Summer (DST): UTC+4:30 (IRDT)

Dowlatabad (Persian: دولتاباد, also Romanized as Dowlatābād and jazireh-ye Dowlatābād) is a village in Mazul Rural District, in the Central District of Nishapur County, Razavi Khorasan Province, Iran. At the 2011 census, its population was 415, in 110 families.
