= Jelyan, Marvdasht =

Jelyan جليان
- Village
- Location within Iran
- Coordinates: 29°57′07″N 52°52′01″E
- Country: Iran
- Province: Fars
- County: Marvdasht
- Bakhsh: Central
- Rural District: Kenareh

Population (2006)
  - Total: 693
- Time zone: UTC+3:30 (IRST)
  - Summer (DST): UTC+4:30 (IRDT)

Jelyan (Persian: جليان, also Romanized as Jelyān) is a village in Kenareh Rural District, in the Central District of Marvdasht County, Fars province, Iran. At the 2006 census, its population was 693, in 196 families.
