= Dowlatabad, Nain =

Dowlatabad دولت آباد
- Village
- Location within Iran
- Coordinates: 32°50′11″N 52°48′28″E
- Country: Iran
- Province: Isfahan
- County: Nain
- Bakhsh: Central
- Rural District: Kuhestan

Population (2006)
  - Total: 10
- Time zone: UTC+3:30 (IRST)
  - Summer (DST): UTC+4:30 (IRDT)

Dowlatabad (Persian: دولت آباد, also Romanized as Dowlatābād) is a village in Kuhestan Rural District, in the Central District of Nain County, Isfahan Province, Iran. At the 2006 census, its population was 10, in 4 families.
