= Ahmad Beheshti =

Iranian Ayatollah

Ayatollah Sheikh Ahmad Beheshti
- آیت الله شیخ احمد بهشتی
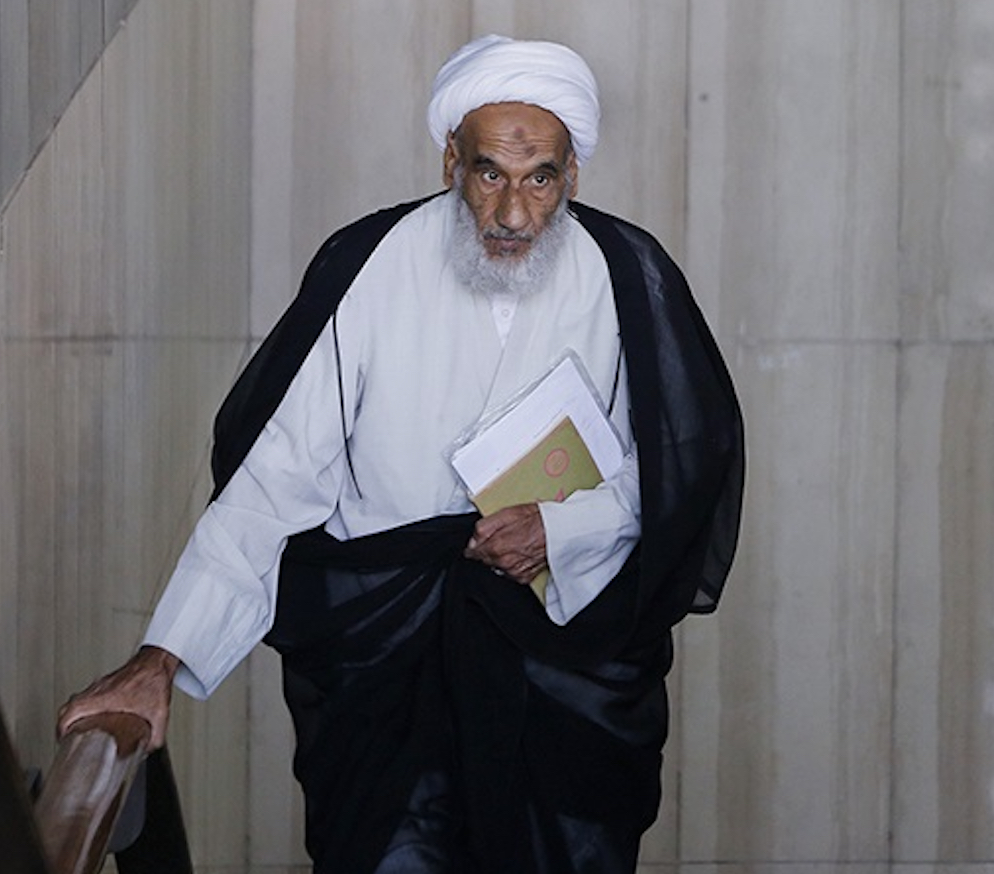
- Beheshti at the fifth term of the Assembly of Experts for Leadership in 2019.

President of University of Qom
- In office 9 August 2010 – 12 March 2013
- Preceded by: Mehdi Ghazi Khorramabadi
- Succeeded by: Asghar Dirbaz

Member of the first and second terms of Islamic Consultative Assembly
- In office 28 May 1980 – 27 May 1988
- Constituency: Fasa – Fars province
- Majority: 27,449 (57.80%)

Member of the Third, Fourth, Fifth and Sixth terms of the Assembly of Experts.
- Incumbent
- Assumed office 23 October 1998
- Preceded by: Ali Sheikh Mohad
- Constituency: Fars province

Friday Prayer Leader in Miyan Deh, Fasa
- Incumbent
- Assumed office 28 October 2014
- احمد بهشتی
- Title: Ayatollah

Personal life
- Born: 1935 (age 90–91) Miyan Deh, Fasa, Imperial State of Iran
- Children: Saeed Beheshti son
- Parent: Abdul Majid Beheshti (father)
- Political party: Society of Seminary Teachers of Qom
- Education: Qom Hawza; Kharazmi University PhD in Philosophy

Religious life
- Religion: Islam
- Jurisprudence: Twelver Shia Islam

Muslim leader
- Teacher: Hossein Borujerdi; Ruhollah Khomeini; Morteza Motahhari

Sheikh Ahmad Beheshti Persian: شیخ احمد بهشتی, (born 1935) is an Iranian Ayatollah. He was the president of Qom University. He represented the people of Fars province in the first and second terms in the Islamic Consultative Assembly, as well as representing in the third, fourth, fifth and sixth terms of the Assembly of Experts.

== Early life and education ==
Ahmad Beheshti was born on 1935 in Miyan Deh, Fasa, Fars province. He was born into a religious family, his father, Hajj Sheikh Abdul Majid Beheshti, was a Shia cleric and prayer leader in his hometown. He was described by people in his hometown as being a pious and humble man, who was very well connected to the people in that area. He also dug his own grave in his hometown, he slept in it for 2 days to remind himself of death.

Ahmad first began his Islamic studies with his father, and then with the advice of his father he attended the Agha Baba Khan Seminary in Shiraz in 1949. While there, he was taught by Hossein Ayatollahi and others. He stayed there until 1954, before attending the Khan School in Shiraz, where he was taught by Seyed Noureddin Hosseini Shirazi, and several other big scholars in the region. Finally, the last school in Shiraz he attended was the Hashemieh School in 1956. In 1959, he finally migrated to Qom to further his Islamic studies in Qom Seminary. While in Qom, he took major emphasis in Islamic philosophy, as well as the main subjects such as Islamic jurisprudence and others to attain Ijtihad. He was taught by many esteemed scholars such as Mohaghegh Damad, Ruhollah Khomeini, and Hossein Borujerdi. After becoming an Ayatollah, Ahmad then attended the Kharazmi University in Tehran to study philosophy. In 1966, he obtained a PhD in philosophy, Morteza Motahhari was one of his professors in the university. He then returned to Qom, to teach Islam in the seminaries as well as being a professor in universities in Tehran and Qom.

== Teachers ==
His teachers included:

- Hossein Ayatollahi
- Hossein Borujerdi
- Ayatollah Khomeini
- Morteza Motahhari
- Muhammad Husayn Tabatabai
- Mostafa Khomeini
- Mehdi Haeri Yazdi

== Political activity ==
Before the 1979 Iranian revolution, Beheshti opposed the Pahlavi dynasty. He received several travel bans for being against the Shah, and was arrested.

After the revolution he represented Fars province in the Iranian Parliament for two terms. He was the president of University of Qom from 2010 to 2013 after the death of Ayatollah Khorramabadi. Asghar Dirbaz succeeded him after he resigned. He has represented Fars in the Assembly of Experts for Leadership since 1998. Since 2014, he has also been the Imam of Friday Prayer in Miyan Deh, Fasa.

== Works ==
Behehsti has published and translated these works.

=== Books published ===
- Jesus (pbuh), the Messenger of Islam (1994)
- Marital Issues and Problems (2004)
- Family Issues and Problems (2004)
- Educational Issues and Problems (2004)
- Revelation and Rationality of Mysticism from the Perspective of Imam Khomeini (2005)
- The Gem and Shell of Religion (2006)
- Lessons from the life of famous women in the Quran, Hadith and History (2007)
- Interpretation of Surah al-Noor (2007)
- Raising a Child in Today's World (2008)
- Islam and Raising Children (2011)
- Taqrir al-Haqiqah fi Sharh Tahrir al-Wasilah – Kitab al-Mawarith (Qom, 2012)
- Islam and Children's Play (2012)
- Alavi Educational Political Thought in the Letters of Nahj al-Balaghah (2014)
- Master Motahhari, the Philosopher of Nature (2014)
- Taqrir al-Haqiqah fi Sharh Tahrir al-Wasilah – Kitab al-Nikah (Tehran, 2015)
- A Review of Imam Sadegh's Political and Moral Thoughts (2015)
- A Review of Imam Kazim's Political and Moral Thoughts (2015)
- Economics in the School of Monotheism (2022)

=== Books translated ===
- The Answer to the Doubts About the Shiite School (1992)
- Existence and its Causes (2004)
- Steps to Advertising (2005)
- Abstraction (Explanation of the Seventh Pattern from Ibn Sina's book of Signs and Warnings) (2006)

=== Articles published ===
- Political Ethics in the Letters of Nahj al-Balaghah
- Philosophical Thoughts of Jaber Bin Hayan (1991)
- Philosophical Thoughts of Jaber Bin Hayyan (2) The Question of Time (1993)
- The Origin and Steps of the World From the Point of View of Hakim Mataleh Lahiji (1993)
- Philosophical Thoughts of Jaber Bin Hayan (3) (1994)
- Philosophical Thoughts of Jaber Bin Hayyan (4) (1995)
- The Influence of Sadr al-Din Dashtaki's Thoughts on Sadr al-Mutallahin Shirazi (2004)
- Critique and Review of the Eagle and Punishment in the System of Justice and Destiny (2004)
- Imam Reza's View on Miracles and Changing Conditions of Time (2004)
- Sharia and Politics in Sadra's Wisdom (2006)

== See also ==
- List of ayatollahs
