= Manhush, Khuzestan province =

Manhush منحوش
- Village
- Location within Iran
- Coordinates: 31°49′34″N 49°00′21″E
- Country: Iran
- Province: Khuzestan
- County: Shushtar
- Bakhsh: Central
- Rural District: Miyan Ab

Population (2006)
  - Total: 357
- Time zone: UTC+3:30 (IRST)
  - Summer (DST): UTC+4:30 (IRDT)

Manhush (Persian: منحوش, also Romanized as Manḩūsh; also known as Dowlatābād, Manhūs, and Mankhūsh) is a village in Miyan Ab Rural District, in the Central District of Shushtar County, Khuzestan Province, Iran. At the 2006 census, its population was 357, in 50 families.
