= Fedashkuyeh Rural District =

Rural district in Fars province, Iran

Fedashkuyeh Rural District Persian: دهستان فدشكوئيه
- Rural District
- Location within Iran
- Coordinates: 28°45′05″N 53°43′50″E
- Country: Iran
- Province: Fars
- County: Fasa
- District: Shibkaveh
- Capital: Fedashkuyeh

Population (2016)
  - Total: 6,388
- Time zone: UTC+3:30 (IRST)

Fedashkuyeh Rural District (Persian: دهستان فدشكوئيه) is in Shibkaveh District of Fasa County, Fars province, Iran. Its capital is the village of Fedashkuyeh.

== Demographics ==
=== Population ===
At the time of the 2006 National Census, the rural district's population was 7,486 in 1,778 households. There were 7,000 inhabitants in 1,903 households at the following census of 2011. The 2016 census measured the population of the rural district as 6,388 in 1,918 households. The most populous of its 18 villages was Fedashkuyeh, with 4,114 people.
