= Shibkaveh District (Fasa County) =

District in Fars province, Iran

Shibkaveh District Persian: بخش شیبکوه
- District
- Location within Iran
- Coordinates: 28°40′05″N 53°52′19″E
- Country: Iran
- Province: Fars
- County: Fasa
- Capital: Zahedshahr

Population (2016)
  - Total: 26,919
- Time zone: UTC+3:30 (IRST)

Shibkaveh District (Persian: بخش شیبکوه) is in Fasa County, Fars province, Iran. Its capital is the city of Zahedshahr. (Note: Formerly the village of Zahedan)

== History ==
After the 2011 National Census, two villages merged to form the new city of Miyanshahr.

== Demographics ==
=== Population ===
At the time of the 2006 census, the district's population was 28,422 in 6,492 households. The following census in 2011 counted 27,635 people in 7,307 households. The 2016 census measured the population of the district as 26,919 inhabitants in 7,980 households.

=== Administrative divisions ===
Shibkaveh District Population
Administrative Divisions	2006	2011	2016
Fedashkuyeh RD	7,486	7,000	6,388
Miyan Deh RD	10,898	11,152	4,900
Miyanshahr (city) (Note: Merger of two villages)			5,912
Zahedshahr (city)	10,038	9,483	9,719
Total	28,422	27,635	26,919
RD = Rural District
