= Sheshdeh Rural District =

Rural district in Fars province, Iran

Sheshdeh Rural District Persian: دهستان ششده
- Rural District
- Location within Iran
- Coordinates: 28°56′57″N 54°03′22″E
- Country: Iran
- Province: Fars
- County: Fasa
- District: Sheshdeh and Qarah Bolagh
- Capital: Sheshdeh

Population (2016)
  - Total: 6,279
- Time zone: UTC+3:30 (IRST)

Sheshdeh Rural District (Persian: دهستان ششده) is in Sheshdeh and Qarah Bolagh District (Note: Formerly Sheshdeh District) of Fasa County, Fars province, Iran. It is administered from the city of Sheshdeh.

== Demographics ==
=== Population ===
At the time of the 2006 National Census, the rural district's population was 7,904 in 1,886 households. There were 7,349 inhabitants in 2,083 households at the following census of 2011. The 2016 census measured the population of the rural district as 6,279 in 1,924 households. The most populous of its 22 villages was Akbarabad, with 1,539 people.
