= Qarah Bolagh Rural District (Fasa County) =

Rural district in Fars province, Iran

Qarah Bolagh Rural District Persian: دهستان قره بلاغ
- Rural District
- Location within Iran
- Coordinates: 28°51′32″N 54°08′28″E
- Country: Iran
- Province: Fars
- County: Fasa
- District: Sheshdeh and Qarah Bolagh
- Capital: Qarah Bolagh

Population (2016)
  - Total: 11,691
- Time zone: UTC+3:30 (IRST)

Qarah Bolagh Rural District (Persian: دهستان قره بلاغ) is in Sheshdeh and Qarah Bolagh District (Note: Formerly Sheshdeh District) of Fasa County, Fars province, Iran. It is administered from the city of Qarah Bolagh.

== Demographics ==
=== Population ===
At the time of the 2006 National Census, the rural district's population was 18,196 in 4,232 households. There were 18,436 inhabitants in 5,141 households at the following census of 2011. The 2016 census measured the population of the rural district as 11,691 in 3,573 households. The most populous of its 26 villages was Amir Hajjilu, with 3,623 people.
