= Now Bandegan Rural District =

Rural district in Fars province, Iran

Now Bandegan Rural District Persian: دهستان نوبندگان
- Rural District
- Location within Iran
- Coordinates: 28°56′05″N 53°53′40″E
- Country: Iran
- Province: Fars
- County: Fasa
- District: Now Bandegan
- Capital: Now Bandegan

Population (2016)
  - Total: 7,951
- Time zone: UTC+3:30 (IRST)

Now Bandegan Rural District (Persian: دهستان نوبندگان) is in Now Bandegan District of Fasa County, Fars province, Iran. It is administered from the city of Now Bandegan.

== Demographics ==
=== Population ===
At the time of the 2006 National Census, the rural district's population was 8,746 in 2,092 households. There were 8,553 inhabitants in 2,427 households at the following census of 2011. The 2016 census measured the population of the rural district as 7,951 in 2,408 households. The most populous of its 64 villages was Khurangan, with 2,437 people.
