= Now Bandegan District =

District in Fars province, Iran

Now Bandegan District Persian: بخش نوبندگان
- District
- Location within Iran
- Coordinates: 28°56′05″N 53°53′40″E
- Country: Iran
- Province: Fars
- County: Fasa
- Capital: Now Bandegan

Population (2016)
  - Total: 10,361
- Time zone: UTC+3:30 (IRST)

Now Bandegan District (Persian: بخش نوبندگان) is in Fasa County, Fars province, Iran. Its capital is the city of Now Bandegan.

== Demographics ==
=== Population ===
At the time of the 2006 National Census, the district's population was 11,679 in 2,858 households. The following census in 2011 counted 11,257 people in 3,248 households. The 2016 census measured the population of the district as 10,361 inhabitants in 3,231 households.

=== Administrative divisions ===
Now Bandegan District Population
Administrative Divisions	2006	2011	2016
Now Bandegan RD	8,746	8,553	7,951
Now Bandegan (city)	2,933	2,704	2,410
Total	11,679	11,257	10,361
RD = Rural District
