= Sheshdeh and Qarah Bolagh District =

District in Fars province, Iran

Sheshdeh and Qarah Bolagh District Persian: بخش ششده و قره بلاغ
- District
- Location within Iran
- Coordinates: 28°53′12″N 54°05′59″E
- Country: Iran
- Province: Fars
- County: Fasa
- Capital: Sheshdeh

Population (2016)
  - Total: 30,702
- Time zone: UTC+3:30 (IRST)

Sheshdeh and Qarah Bolagh District (Persian: بخش ششده و قره بلاغ) (Note: Formerly Sheshdeh District (بخش ششده)) is in Fasa County, Fars province, Iran. Its capital is the city of Sheshdeh.

== History ==
In 2013, several villages merged to form the new city of Qarah Bolagh.

== Demographics ==
=== Population ===
At the time of the 2006 National Census, the district's population was 31,672 in 7,401 households. The following census in 2011 counted 31,347 people in 8,721 households. The 2016 census measured the population of the district as 30,702 inhabitants in 9,258 households.

Sheshdeh and Qarah Bolagh District Population
| Administrative Divisions | 2006 | 2011 | 2016 |
|---|---|---|---|
| Qarah Bolagh RD | 18,196 | 18,436 | 11,691 |
| Sheshdeh RD | 7,904 | 7,349 | 6,279 |
| Qarah Bolagh (city) (Note: Merger of several villages) | | | 6,772 |
| Sheshdeh (city) | 5,572 | 5,562 | 5,960 |
| Total | 31,672 | 31,347 | 30,702 |
RD = Rural District
