= Fasa County =

County in Fars province, Iran

Fasa County Persian: شهرستان فسا
- County
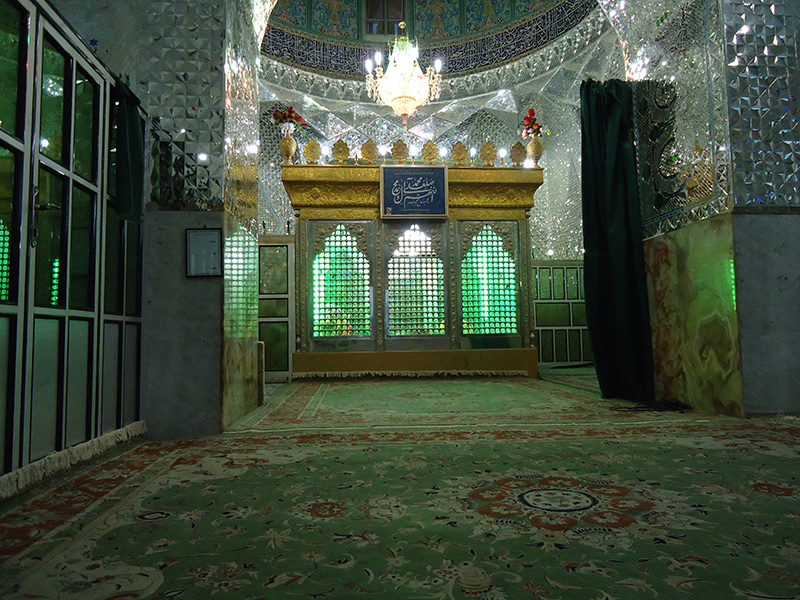
- An emamzadeh in Fasa

- Location of Fasa County in Fars province (center right, green)

- Location of Fars province in Iran
- Coordinates: 29°00′N 53°34′E
- Country: Iran
- Province: Fars
- Capital: Fasa
- Districts: Central, Now Bandegan, Sheshdeh and Qarah Bolagh, Shibkaveh

Population (2016)
  - Total: 205,187
- Time zone: UTC+3:30 (IRST)

Fasa County (Persian: شهرستان فسا) is in Fars province, Iran. Its capital is the city of Fasa.

== History ==
In 2013, several villages merged to form the new city of Qarah Bolagh. Two villages merged to form the new city of Miyanshahr.

== Demographics ==
=== Population ===
At the time of the 2006 National Census, the county's population was 188,189 in 45,333 households. The following census in 2011 counted 203,129 people in 55,749 households. The 2016 census measured the population of the county as 205,187 in 61,509 households.

=== Administrative divisions ===
Fasa County's population history and administrative structure over three consecutive censuses are shown in the following table.

Fasa County Population
Administrative Divisions	2006	2011	2016
Central District	116,416	132,249	137,025
Jangal RD	4,694	5,451	5,535
Kushk-e Qazi RD	12,129	12,345	11,793
Sahrarud RD	9,342	9,644	8,872
Fasa (city)	90,251	104,809	110,825
Now Bandegan District	11,679	11,257	10,361
Now Bandegan RD	8,746	8,553	7,951
Now Bandegan (city)	2,933	2,704	2,410
Sheshdeh and Qarah Bolagh District (Note: Formerly Sheshdeh District)	31,672	31,347	30,702
Qarah Bolagh RD	18,196	18,436	11,691
Sheshdeh RD	7,904	7,349	6,279
Qarah Bolagh (city) (Note: Merger of several villages)			6,772
Sheshdeh (city)	5,572	5,562	5,960
Shibkaveh District	28,422	27,635	26,919
Fedashkuyeh RD	7,486	7,000	6,388
Miyan Deh RD	10,898	11,152	4,900
Miyanshahr (city) (Note: Merger of two villages)			5,912
Zahedshahr (city) (Note: Formerly the village of Zahedan)	10,038	9,483	9,719
Total	188,189	203,129	205,187
RD = Rural District

== See also ==
Media related to Fasa County at Wikimedia Commons
