= Nasrabad =

Nasrabad or Naserabad or Nasr Abad (Persian: ناصراباد) may refer to various places in Iran:

== Alborz Province ==
- Naserabad, Alborz

== Ardabil Province ==
- Nasrabad, Ardabil, a village in Meshgin Shahr County

== Chaharmahal and Bakhtiari Province ==
- Naserabad, Chaharmahal and Bakhtiari, a village in Borujen County

== East Azerbaijan Province ==
- Nasrabad, East Azerbaijan, a village in Hashtrud County

== Fars Province ==
- Nasrabad, Darab, a village in Darab County
- Nasrabad, Eqlid, a village in Eqlid County
- Nasrabad, Marvdasht, a village in Marvdasht County
- Nasrabad, Neyriz, a village in Neyriz County
- Nasrabad, Shiraz, a village in Shiraz County

== Gilan Province ==
- Nasrabad, Gilan, a village in Rasht County

== Golestan Province ==
- Nasrabad, Golestan, a village in Gorgan County

== Hamadan Province ==
- Nasrabad, Hamadan, a village in Famenin County
- Naserabad, Hamadan, a village in Kabudarahang County
- Nasrabad, Malayer, a village in Malayer Province

== Hormozgan Province ==
- Naserabad, Hormozgan, a village in Rudan County

== Isfahan Province ==
- Nasrabad, former name of Sefidshahr, a city in Aran va Bidgol County
- Nasrabad, Isfahan, a city in Isfahan County
- Nasrabad, Kashan, a village in Kashan County
- Nasrabad, Khur and Biabanak, a village in Khur and Biabanak County
- Nasrabad, Nain, a village in Nain County

== Kerman Province ==
- Nasrabad, Anbarabad, a village in Anbarabad County
- Naserabad, Bardsir, a village in Bardsir County
- Naserabad, Kahnuj, a village in Kahnuj County
- Nasrabad, Kerman, a village in Kerman County
- Naserabad, Shahdad, a village in Kerman County
- Naserabad, Narmashir, a village in Narmashir County
- Naserabad, Rigan, a village in Rigan County
- Naserabad-e Chah-e Malek, a village in Rigan County
- Naserabad-e Chahgavari, a village in Rigan County
- Nasrabad, Zarand, a village in Zarand County

== Kermanshah Province ==
- Nasrabad Seyyed Hatam, a village in Qasr-e Shirin County
- Nasrabad-e Pasha, a village in Qasr-e Shirin County
- Nasrabad-e Seyyed Ahmad, a village in Qasr-e Shirin County
- Nasrabad Seyyed Ahmad, alternate name of Ney Pahn-e Abdollah, a village in Qasr-e Shirin County
- Nasrabad-e Seyyed Khalil, a village in Qasr-e Shirin County
- Nasrabad Rural District (Kermanshah Province), in Qasr-e Shirin County

== Khuzestan Province ==
- Naserabad, Khuzestan, a village in Hendijan County

== Kohgiluyeh and Boyer-Ahmad Province ==
- Naserabad, Kohgiluyeh and Boyer-Ahmad, a village in Charam County

== Kurdistan Province ==
- Naserabad, Kurdistan, a village in Dehgolan County

== Lorestan Province ==
- Nasrabad, Lorestan

== Markazi Province ==
- Nasrabad, Markazi, a village in Khomeyn County
- Nasrabad, Khondab, a village in Khondab County

== Mazandaran Province ==
- Naserabad, Amol, a village in Amol County
- Naserabad, Mahmudabad, a village in Mahmudabad County
- Naserabad, Nowshahr, a village in Nowshahr County

== North Khorasan Province ==
- Nasrabad, North Khorasan

== Qazvin Province ==
- Naserabad, Abyek
- Naserabad, Qazvin
- Nasirabad, Qazvin

== Razavi Khorasan Province ==
- Nasrabad, Razavi Khorasan, a city in Torbat-e Jam County
- Nasrabad, Bardaskan, a village in Bardaskan County
- Nasrabad, Chenaran, a village in Chenaran County
- Nasrabad, Firuzeh, a village in Firuzeh County
- Nasrabad, Khalilabad, a village in Khalilabad County
- Nasrabad, Khoshab, a village in Khoshab County
- Nasrabad, Khvaf, a village in Khvaf County
- Nasrabad, Mahvelat, a village in Mahvelat County
- Nasrabad, Mashhad, a village in Mashhad County
- Nasrabad, Razaviyeh, a village in Mashhad County
- Nasrabad, Binalud, a village in Nishapur County
- Nasrabad, Miyan Jolgeh, a village in Nishapur County
- Nasrabad-e Olya, a village in Nishapur County
- Nasrabad, Salehabad, a village in Torbat-e Jam County
- Nasrabad, Zaveh, a village in Zaveh County
- Nasrabad District

== Sistan and Baluchestan Province ==
- Naserabad, Abtar, a village in Iranshahr County
- Naserabad, Howmeh, a village in Iranshahr County
- Nasrabad-e Rutak, a village in Khash County
- Naserabad-e Talarak, a village in Khash County

== South Khorasan Province ==
- Naserabad (32°45′ N 59°24′ E), Birjand, a village in Birjand County
- Nasrabad, Khusf, a village in Khusf County
- Nasrabad, Jolgeh-e Mazhan, a village in Khusf County
- Nasrabad, Sarbisheh, a village in Sarbisheh County
- Nasrabad, Tabas, a village in Tabas County

== Tehran Province ==
- Naserabad, Tehran

== Yazd Province ==
- Nasrabad, Taft
- Nasrabad, Nir, a village in Taft County
- Nasrabad Rural District (Taft County)

== Zanjan Province ==
- Naserabad, Khorramdarreh, a village in Khorramdarreh County
- Nasrabad-e Torpakhlu, a village in Zanjan County

== See also ==
- Naseerabad (disambiguation)
- Nasirabad (disambiguation)
