= Nasirabad =

Nasirabad or Nasir Abad (Persian: ناصر آباد) may refer to:

== Bangladesh ==
- Mymensingh, Bangladesh, formerly named Nasirabad
- Nasirabad College, Mymensingh college in Mymensingh city

== India ==
- Nasirabad, Ajmer, a town in Rajasthan, India
  - Nasirabad Assembly constituency
  - Nasirabad railway station
- Nasirabad, Raebareli, a village in Uttar Pradesh, India

== Iran ==
=== Ardabil Province ===
- Nasirabad, Kowsar, a village in Kowsar County
- Nasirabad, Meshgin Shahr, a village in Meshgin Shahr County
- Nasirabad, Meshgin-e Sharqi, a village in Meshgin Shahr County

=== Chaharmahal and Bakhtiari Province ===
- Nasirabad, Borujen, a village in Borujen County
- Nasirabad, Farsan, a village in Farsan County
- Nasirabad-e Galeh, a village in Farsan County
- Nasirabad, Dasht-e Zarrin, a village in Kuhrang County
- Nasirabad, Shurab-e Tangazi, a village in Kuhrang County
- Nasirabad, Lordegan, a village in Lordegan County

=== East Azerbaijan Province ===
- Nasirabad, Charuymaq, a village in Charuymaq County
- Nasirabad-e Olya, a village in Hashtrud County
- Nasirabad-e Sofla, a village in Hashtrud County
- Nasirabad (38°26′ N 46°46′ E), Varzaqan, a village in Varzaqan County
- Nasirabad (38°29′ N 46°44′ E), Varzaqan, a village in Varzaqan County

=== Fars Province ===
- Nasirabad, Arsanjan, a village in Arsanjan County
- Nasirabad, Darab, a village in Darab County
- Nasirabad, Eqlid, a village in Eqlid County
- Nasirabad, Fasa, a village in Fasa County
- Nasirabad, Jahrom, a village in Jahrom County
- Nasirabad, Kazerun, a village in Kazerun County
- Nasirabad, Neyriz, a village in Neyriz County

=== Hamadan Province ===
- Nasirabad, Hamadan, a village in Famenin County
- Nasirabad, Kabudarahang, a village in Kabudarahang County

=== Isfahan Province ===
- Nasirabad, alternate name of Nasrabad, Isfahan, a city in Isfahan County
- Nasrrabad, Kashan, a village in Kashan County
- Nasirabad, Lay Siyah, a village in Nain County

=== Khuzestan Province ===
- Nasirabad, Hendijan, a village in Hendijan County

=== Lorestan Province ===
- Nasirabad, Borujerd, a village in Borujerd County, Lorestan Province, Iran
- Nasirabad, Khorramabad, a village in Khorramabad County, Lorestan Province, Iran

=== Markazi Province ===
- Nasirabad, Khondab, a village in Khondab County
- Nasirabad, Zarandieh, a village in Zarandieh County

=== Mazaandaran Province ===
- Nasirabad, Sari, a village in Sari County
- Nasirabad, Tonekabon, a village in Tonekabon County

=== North Khorasan Province ===
- Nasirabad, alternate name of Nasrabad, North Khorasan, Iran

=== Qazvin Province ===
- Nasirabad, Qazvin, Iran
- Nasirabad, alternate name of Naserabad, Qazvin, Iran
- Nasirabad-e Sadat, a village in Takestan County, Qazvin Province, Iran

=== Razavi Khorasan Province ===
- Nasirabad, Khvaf, a village in Khvaf County, Razavi Khorasan Province, Iran
- Nasirabad, Nishapur, a village in Nishapur County, Razavi Khorasan Province, Iran
- Nasirabad, Zaveh, a village in Zaveh County, Razavi Khorasan Province, Iran

=== South Khorasan Province ===
- Nasirabad, Birjand, a village in Birjand County
- Nasirabad, Qaen, a village in Qaen County
- Nasirabad, Tabas, a village in Tabas County

=== Tehran Province ===
- Nasirabad, Tehran, a city in Iran
- Nasirabad, Varamin, a village in Varamin County, Tehran Province, Iran

=== West Azerbaijan Province ===
- Nasirabad, West Azerbaijan, a village in Urmia County

=== Zanjan Province ===
- Nasirabad, Khorramdarreh, a village in Khorramdarreh County
- Nasirabad, Mahneshan, a village in Mahneshan County
- Nasirabad, Zanjan, a village in Zanjan County

== Pakistan ==
- Nasirabad, Sindh
- Nasirabad (Hunza) in Hunza Valley
- Nasirabad Division in the Balochistan
- Nasirabad District in the Balochistan

== See also ==
- Naseerabad (disambiguation)
- Nasrabad (disambiguation)
- Nasirpur (disambiguation)
