= Sabzuiyeh =

Sabzuiyeh or Sabzuyeh (Persian: سبزوئيه or سبزويه) may refer to:

- Sabzuiyeh, Darab (سبزويه - Sabzūīyeh), Fars Province
- Sabzuyeh, Neyriz (سبزويه - Sabzūyeh), Fars Province
- Sabzuiyeh, Kerman (سبزوئيه - Sabzū’īyeh)
