= Nasirpur =

Nasirpur may refer to:

- Nasirpur, Bewar, a village in Uttar Pradesh, India
- Nasirpur, Ghiror, a village in Uttar Pradesh, India
- Nasirpur, Jalandhar, a village in Punjab, India
- Nasirpur, Karhal, a village in Uttar Pradesh, India
- Nasirpur, Sultanpur Lodhi, a village in Punjab, India
- Nasirpur, a village in Akania Nasirpur, Bangladesh

== See also ==
- Nasirabad (disambiguation)
- Nasipur, a village in West Bengal, India
- Naserpur, a town in Sindh, Pakistan
