= Simiareh =

Simiareh سيمياره
- Village
- Location within Iran
- Coordinates: 29°24′36″N 54°15′01″E
- Country: Iran
- Province: Fars
- County: Neyriz
- Bakhsh: Central
- Rural District: Rostaq

Population (2006)
  - Total: 80
- Time zone: UTC+3:30 (IRST)
  - Summer (DST): UTC+4:30 (IRDT)

Simiareh (Persian: سيمياره, also Romanized as Sīmīāreh) is a village in Rostaq Rural District, in the Central District of Neyriz County, Fars province, Iran. At the 2006 census, its population was 80, in 19 families.
