= Chak-e Nar =

Chak-e Nar چك نار
- Village
- Country: Iran
- Province: Fars
- County: Neyriz
- Bakhsh: Central
- Rural District: Horgan

Population (2006)
  - Total: 16
- Time zone: UTC+3:30 (IRST)
  - Summer (DST): UTC+4:30 (IRDT)

Chak-e Nar (Persian: چك نار, also Romanized as Chak-e Nār) is a village in Horgan Rural District, in the Central District of Neyriz County, Fars province, Iran. At the 2006 census, its population was 16, in 4 families.
