= Fazel =

- Pronunciation: Arabic: [faːdˤɪl]
- Gender: Male

Origin
- Origin: Arabic/Persian
- Meaning: "virtuous, اهلِ فضل"

Other names
- Alternative spelling: Fadil, Fadel, Fazil

Fazel in Persian, or Fadhel (Arabic: فاضل) is an Arabic and Persian male given and also surname meaning "virtuous".

It may refer to:

- Michael Fadel (1710–1795), Maronite Patriarch of Antioch
- Fazel Darbandi (died 1869/70), Iranian Shia cleric and scholar
- Mustafa Fazl Pasha (1830–1875), Ottoman Egyptian prince
- Muhammad Fadhel al-Jamali (1903–1997), Iraqi politician
- Fazıl Küçük (1906–1984), Vice President of the Republic of Cyprus
- Mounir Abou Fadel (1912–1987), political figure in Lebanon
- Mohammad Fazel Lankarani (1931–2007), Iranian Islamic cleric
- Iradj Fazel (born 1939), Iranian surgeon and academic
- Fadhil Al Azzawi (born 1940), Iraqi writer
- Mohamed Fadel Ismail Ould Es-Sweyih (1950–2002), Sahrawi nationalist politician, member of the Polisario Front
- Fazel Maleki (born 1953), Iraqi Twelver Shi'a Marja
- Fadel Benyaich (born 1953), member of the royal cabinet of Morocco
- Fadhel Jaziri (1948–2025), Tunisian film director
- Fadhil Abbas al-Ka'bi (born 1955), Iraqi children's writer and poet
- Abdullah Mohamed Fadil (died 1991), Somali soldier
- Fadhil Jalil al-Barwari (born 1966), Iraqi military commander
- Fazul Abdullah Mohammed (1973–2011), al-Qaeda leader in East Africa
- Mohamed Fadel Fahmy, or Mohamed Fahmy (born 1974), Egyptian-born Canadian journalist and author
- Fadhel Al-Matrook (1979–2011), Bahraini killed as in Death of Fadhel Al-Matrook
- Abbas Fahdel, Iraqi-French film director, screenwriter and film critic
- Hussain Fadhel (born 1984), Kuwaiti footballer
- Fadel Ahmad (born 1985), UAE footballer
- Ali Bahjat Fadhil (born 1992), Iraqi footballer
- Ahmad Fadhel, (born 1992), Iraqi footballer
- Mohamed Kamal Fadel, Polisario Front representative to Australia & New Zealand

== Places ==
- Deh Fazel, Iran
- Kalateh-ye Fazel, Iran
