= Ghadirgah =

Ghadirgah غديرگه
- Village
- Location within Iran
- Coordinates: 29°19′32″N 54°10′13″E
- Country: Iran
- Province: Fars
- County: Neyriz
- Bakhsh: Central
- Rural District: Rostaq

Population (2006)
  - Total: 393
- Time zone: UTC+3:30 (IRST)
  - Summer (DST): UTC+4:30 (IRDT)

Ghadirgah (Persian: غديرگه, also Romanized as Ghadīrgah) is a village in Rostaq Rural District, in the Central District of Neyriz County, Fars province, Iran. At the 2006 census, its population was 393, in 88 families.
