= Chah Dimeh =

Chah Dimeh چاه ديمه
- Village
- Location within Iran
- Coordinates: 28°57′03″N 54°35′02″E
- Country: Iran
- Province: Fars
- County: Neyriz
- Bakhsh: Central
- Rural District: Horgan

Population (2006)
  - Total: 65
- Time zone: UTC+3:30 (IRST)
  - Summer (DST): UTC+4:30 (IRDT)

Chah Dimeh (Persian: چاه ديمه, also Romanized as Chāh Dīmeh and Chāhdīmeh) is a village in Horgan Rural District, in the Central District of Neyriz County, Fars province, Iran. At the 2006 census, its population was 65, in 19 families.
