= Pahnabeh =

Pahnabeh پهنابه
- Village
- Location within Iran
- Coordinates: 28°58′34″N 54°31′41″E
- Country: Iran
- Province: Fars
- County: Neyriz
- Bakhsh: Central
- Rural District: Horgan

Population (2006)
  - Total: 43
- Time zone: UTC+3:30 (IRST)
  - Summer (DST): UTC+4:30 (IRDT)

Pahnabeh (Persian: پهنابه, also Romanized as Pahnābeh) is a village in Horgan Rural District, in the Central District of Neyriz County, Fars province, Iran. At the 2006 census, its population was 43, in 11 families.
