= Dasht-e Vel =

Dasht-e Vel دشت ول
- Village
- Location within Iran
- Coordinates: 29°10′31″N 54°16′57″E
- Country: Iran
- Province: Fars
- County: Neyriz
- Bakhsh: Central
- Rural District: Rostaq

Population (2006)
  - Total: 57
- Time zone: UTC+3:30 (IRST)
  - Summer (DST): UTC+4:30 (IRDT)

Dasht-e Vel (Persian: دشت ول) is a village in Rostaq Rural District, in the Central District of Neyriz County, Fars province, Iran. At the 2006 census, its population was 57, in 14 families.
