= Lay Hana =

Lay Hana لاي حنا
- Village
- Location within Iran
- Coordinates: 29°12′23″N 54°14′47″E
- Country: Iran
- Province: Fars
- County: Neyriz
- Bakhsh: Central
- Rural District: Rostaq

Population (2006)
  - Total: 98
- Time zone: UTC+3:30 (IRST)
  - Summer (DST): UTC+4:30 (IRDT)

Lay Hana (Persian: لاي حنا, also Romanized as Lāy Ḩanā; also known as Lā-ye Hanā and Lāy Janā) is a village in Rostaq Rural District, in the Central District of Neyriz County, Fars province, Iran. At the 2006 census, its population was 98, in 28 families.
