= Aliabad-e Shur =

Aliabad-e Shur (Persian: سيرزار) may refer to:

- Aliabad-e Shur, Fars
- Aliabad-e Shur, Khalilabad, Razavi Khorasan Province
- Aliabad-e Shur, Sabzevar, Razavi Khorasan Province
