= Gahrab =

Gahrab گهراب
- Village
- Location within Iran
- Coordinates: 28°32′03″N 53°58′08″E
- Country: Iran
- Province: Fars
- County: Fasa
- Bakhsh: Shibkaveh
- Rural District: Miyan Deh

Population (2006)
  - Total: 762
- Time zone: UTC+3:30 (IRST)
  - Summer (DST): UTC+4:30 (IRDT)

Gahrab (Persian: گهراب, also Romanized as Gahrāb) is a village in Miyan Deh Rural District, Shibkaveh District, Fasa County, Fars province, Iran. At the 2006 census, its population was 762, in 168 families.
