= Tall Mahtabi =

Village in Fars province, Iran

Tall Mahtabi Persian: تل مهتابي
- Village
- Location within Iran
- Coordinates: 29°13′45″N 54°19′29″E
- Country: Iran
- Province: Fars
- County: Neyriz
- District: Central
- Rural District: Rostaq

Population (2016)
  - Total: 1,050
- Time zone: UTC+3:30 (IRST)

Tall Mahtabi (Persian: تل مهتابي) (Note: Also romanized as Tall Mahtābī) is a village in Rostaq Rural District of the Central District of Neyriz County, Fars province, Iran. The inhabitants of Tall Mahtabi village belong to the Ghani clan of the Arab Khamseh tribe and they speak Arabic.

== Demographics ==
=== Population ===
At the time of the 2006 National Census, the village's population was 1,039 in 239 households. The following census in 2011 counted 1,111 people in 283 households. The 2016 census measured the population of the village as 1,050 people in 307 households. It was the most populous village in its rural district.
