= Bonkuy-e Ashayir Owlad Sani =

Bonkuy-e Ashayir Owlad Sani بنكوي عشايراولادثاني
- Village
- Country: Iran
- Province: Fars
- County: Fasa
- Bakhsh: Shibkaveh
- Rural District: Miyan Deh

Population (2006)
  - Total: 108
- Time zone: UTC+3:30 (IRST)
  - Summer (DST): UTC+4:30 (IRDT)

Bonkuy-e Ashayir Owlad Sani (Persian: بنكوي عشايراولادثاني, also Romanized as Bonkūy-e 'Ashāyīr Owlād S̄ānī) is a village in Miyan Deh Rural District, Shibkaveh District, Fasa County, Fars province, Iran. At the 2006 census, its population was 108, in 26 families.
