= Mah Kord =

Mah Kord مه كرد
- Village
- Location within Iran
- Coordinates: 28°35′52″N 53°51′29″E
- Country: Iran
- Province: Fars
- County: Fasa
- Bakhsh: Shibkaveh
- Rural District: Miyan Deh

Population (2006)
  - Total: 30
- Time zone: UTC+3:30 (IRST)
  - Summer (DST): UTC+4:30 (IRDT)

Mah Kord (Persian: مه كرد; also known as Kūshk-e va Mahkord and Mākurd) is a village in Miyan Deh Rural District, Shibkaveh District, Fasa County, Fars province, Iran. At the 2006 census, its population was 30, in 7 families.
