= Aliabad-e Shur, Fars =

Aliabad-e Shur علي ابادشور
- Village
- Location within Iran
- Coordinates: 29°15′27″N 54°14′12″E
- Country: Iran
- Province: Fars
- County: Neyriz
- Bakhsh: Central
- Rural District: Rostaq

Population (2006)
  - Total: 190
- Time zone: UTC+3:30 (IRST)
  - Summer (DST): UTC+4:30 (IRDT)

Aliabad-e Shur (Persian: علي ابادشور, also Romanized as 'Alīābād-e Shūr; also known as 'Alīābād) is a village in Rostaq Rural District, in the Central District of Neyriz County, Fars province, Iran. At the 2006 census, its population was 190, in 42 families.
