= Hargan =

Hargan may refer to:

- Hargan, Iran, a village in Fars Province
- Eric Hargan (born 1968), American civil servant
- Gerry Hargan, Irish Gaelic footballer
- Sean Hargan (born 1974), Northern Ireland footballer
- Steve Hargan (born 1942), American baseball player
