= Sadra =

Sadra may refer to:

- Sadra, Fars, a city in Shiraz County, Fars Province, Iran
- Mulla Sadra, Iranian philosopher
- SADRA, Iran Marine Industrial Company
- Shahrak-e Sadra, Neyriz
- Sadra (island), an island in Persian Gulf
- Sadra (music)
- Sadra, Gandhinagar, village in Gujarat state, India
