= Shahrak-e Sadra =

Shahrak-e Sadra or Shahrak-e Sadara (Persian: شهرك صدرا) may refer to:

- Shahrak-e Sadra, Neyriz
- Shahrak-e Sadara, Shiraz
