= Suzu =

Suzu may refer to:

- Suzu (bell), small Japanese bells used in Shinto
- Suzu, Ishikawa, city in Ishikawa Prefecture, Japan
- Sabzuyeh, Neyriz, also known as Sūzū, a village in Neyriz County, Fars Province, Iran

== Temple names ==
Suzu (肅祖) was a Chinese temple name. It may refer to:

- Emperor Ming of Jin (299–325)
- Yuan Xie (died 508), regent of Northern Wei

== People ==
- Suzu Amano (天野 紗, born 2004), Japanese footballer
- Suzu Chiba (千葉 すず, born 1975), Japanese freestyle swimmer
- Suzu Hirose (広瀬 すず, born 1998), Japanese actress and model
- Suzu Natsume (夏目 鈴, born 1991), Japanese actress
- Suzu Suzuki (鈴季 すず, born 1998), Japanese professional wrestler

== Fictional characters ==
- Bobobo suzu, a fictional character from the anime/manga series Bobobo-bo Bo-bobo
- Suzu, a fiction character from the anime, manga, and light novel series Nagasarete Airantō
- Suzu Nyanko, the human pseudonym of Sailor Tin Nyanko, in the Sailor Moon metaseries
- Suzu Hōjō, protagonist of In This Corner of the World
- Suzu, a survivor of the fallen Crogenitor empire in Maxis' Action RPG, Darkspore.
- Suzu Naito, the fictional protagonist of 2021 Japanese animated science fantasy film Belle
- Suzu Minase, a character in the Revue Starlight franchise
