= Madhan, Mainpuri =

Village in Uttar Pradesh, India

Madhan
- Village
- Location in Uttar Pradesh, India
- Coordinates: 27.26137°N 78.85993°E
- Country: India
- State: Uttar Pradesh
- District: Mainpuri

Area
  - Total: 14.44 km^{2} (5.58 sq mi)

Population (2011)
  - Total: 8,099
  - Density: 560.9/km^{2} (1,453/sq mi)
- Time zone: UTC+5:30 (IST)
- PIN: 205263

Madhan is a village in Ghiror block of Mainpuri district, Uttar Pradesh, India. It is located on the road from Ghiror to Kuraoli, where it crosses the Isan river. There is an old fort in the village. As of 2011, Madhan had a population of 8,099, in 1,266 households.

== Geography ==
Madhan is located about 19 km west of Mainpuri, the district headquarters. The Isan river passes by the village, and the road from Ghiror to Kuraoli goes through the village and crosses over the river here. There is an old khera (mound) in the village, and there is an old fort on the khera.

== History ==
At the turn of the 20th century, Madhan had a small bazar, which held markets twice per week, and a local school teaching in the Hindustani language. A local family of Chauhan Rajputs lived in the old fort on the khera. As of 1901, Madhan's population was recorded as 2,434, and it contained 12 hamlets.

== Demographics ==
As of 2011, Madhan had a population of 8,099, in 1,266 households. This population was 53.2% male (4,305) and 46.8% female (3,794). The 0-6 age group numbered 1,433 (745 male and 688 female), or 17.7% of the total population. 1,577 residents were members of Scheduled Castes, or 19.5% of the total.

The 1981 census recorded Madhan as having a population of 4,366 people, in 749 households.

The 1961 census recorded Madhan as comprising 11 hamlets, with a total population of 2,943 people (1,579 male and 1,364 female), in 538 households and 450 physical houses. The area of the village was given as 3,582 acres and it had a post office at that point.

== Infrastructure ==
As of 2011, Madhan had 2 primary schools; it did not have any healthcare facilities. Drinking water was provided by tap, hand pump, and tube well/borehole; there were no public toilets. The village did not have a post office or public library; there was at least some access to electricity for all purposes. Streets were made of both kachcha and pakka materials.
