= Ghiror =

- Town
- Location in Uttar Pradesh, India Ghiror (India)
- Coordinates: 27°10′N 78°48′E
- Country: India
- State: Uttar Pradesh
- District: Mainpuri

Area
  - Total: 13 km^{2} (5.0 sq mi)

Population (2011)
  - Total: 15,911
  - Density: 1,200/km^{2} (3,200/sq mi)

Languages
  - Official: Hindi
- Time zone: UTC+5:30 (IST)
- Postal code: 205121
- Vehicle registration: UP 84
- Website: up.gov.in

Ghiror, also spelled Ghiraur, is a town and a nagar panchayat in Mainpuri district in the state of Uttar Pradesh, India. It is also the headquarters of a community development block comprising 74 villages. As of 2011, Ghiror has a population of 15,911, in 2,687 households.

== Name ==
According to Paul Whalley, the name Ghiror is derived from gherā, meaning an enclosure for cattle.

== Geography ==
Ghiror is located at about the midway point on the road between Mainpuri and Shikohabad. A fairly prominent jhil is here. As of 2011, the town of Ghiror has a total area of 13 square kilometres.

== History ==
As of 1901, Ghiror was described as a predominantly agricultural village, although it also had some importance as a local trade centre. It had a bazar which held markets twice a week dealing in cloth, grain, and cattle. It also had a police station, post office, cattle pound, and school teaching in Hindi. It consisted of 9 hamlets, covering 1,902 acres, and the total population was 2,631. It was the seat of a pargana in tehsil Mainpuri; it had previously been the seat of a tehsil itself. As for pargana Ghiror, it had been formed out of the earlier "Kismat Duyam", which had itself been formed from the division of pargana Rapri in 1824.

== Demographics ==
Historical population
Year	Pop.	±%
1991	8,139	—
2001	12,111	+48.8%
2011	15,911	+31.4%
Source: 2011 Census of India

As of 2011, the town of Ghiror had a population of 15,911, in 2,687 households. This population was 52.1% male (8,297) and 47.9% female (7,614). The 0-6 age group numbered 2,531 (1,340 male and 1,191 female), or 15.9% of the total population. 3,269 residents were members of Scheduled Castes, or 20.5% of the total. The town's literacy rate was 73.6% (counting only people age 7 and up). As of 2011 India census, Ghiraur had a population of 17,401. Males constitute 53% of the population and females 47%. Ghiraur has an average literacy rate of 54%, lower than the national average of 59.5%: male literacy is 61%, and female literacy is 47%. In Ghiraur, 20% of the population is under 6 years of age.

The 1961 census recorded Ghiror as comprising 7 hamlets, with a total population of 3,084 people (1,736 male and 1,348 female), in 602 households and 389 physical houses. The area of the village was given as 1,903 acres and it was listed as having a hospital at that point. The census also listed a cattle market as meeting here twice per week (Wednesday and Saturday) with an average attendance of about 50 people.

== Infrastructure ==
As of 2011, Ghiror has 2 hospitals, 15 medicine shops, 10 schools teaching at the primary level, 3 schools teaching at the secondary level, 1 stadium, 1 cinema, and 2 public libraries. Drinking water is provided by both hand pump and tube well. There is no local firefighting department; the closest is in Mainpuri.

== Transportation ==
Roads connect Ghiror with Mainpuri, Shikohabad, Jasrana, Kuraoli, and Kosma. The nearest railway station is in Kosma, about 8 km east of Ghiror.

In terms of air transport, the closest international airports are Chaudhary Charan Singh Airport and Indira Gandhi International Airport; the closest airports overall are Kanpur Airport, Agra Airport, and Saifai Airstrip.

== Village list ==
The following 74 villages are counted as part of Ghiror CD block:

1. Achalpur
2. Ahmadpur
3. Akbarpur Aunchha
4. Amberpur
5. Ataharaina
6. Aurangabad
7. Badshahpur
8. Balampur
9. Bamhauri Awahar
10. Bamrauli
11. Bhatani
12. Bhugai
13. Bidhuna
14. Bighrayi
15. Bikarampur
16. Budhrra
17. Chitayi
18. Dannahar
19. Darapur
20. Darwah
21. Devpura
22. Dhaurasi
23. Esaimadhupuri
24. Faizpur
25. Fazilpur
26. Gariya Khas
27. Gathiya Sakat
28. Ghiror (rural)
29. Godhna
30. Gurahi
31. Hajipur
32. Harhai
33. Himmatpur Harayi
34. Himmatpur Ujiyari
35. Kalhaur Panchha
36. Kalhorpuwan
37. Kanegi
38. Kerawali
39. Kosma Hinood
40. Kosma Musalmeen
41. Koson
42. Kothiya
43. Kurawali
44. Lapgavan
45. Lohabal Khera
46. Madhan
47. Mahtauli
48. Muhammadpur Ghiror
49. Nagla Amarsingh
50. Nagla Devi
51. Nagla Fateh Khan
52. Nagla Indr
53. Nagla Kanchan
54. Nagla Kathengara
55. Nagla Mahanand
56. Nagla Manjha
57. Nagla Minte
58. Nagla Punu
59. Nagla Rama
60. Nagla Salehi
61. Nagla Sauj
62. Nahili
63. Nasirpur
64. Neelakanthpur
65. Oya
66. Pachaver
67. Padriya
68. Rampura
69. Shahjadpur
70. Shahjahanpur
71. Taharpur
72. Talibpur
73. Tisah
74. Usnida
