= Tisah =

Village in Uttar Pradesh, India

- Village
- Location in Uttar Pradesh, India
- Coordinates: 27.28874°N 78.82779°E
- Country: India
- State: Uttar Pradesh
- District: Mainpuri

Area
  - Total: 3.408 km^{2} (1.316 sq mi)

Population (2011)
  - Total: 2,076
  - Density: 609.2/km^{2} (1,578/sq mi)
- Time zone: UTC+5:30 (IST)

Tisah (Tisāh) is a village in Ghiror block of Mainpuri district, Uttar Pradesh. As of 2011, it has a population of 2,076, in 319 households.

== Demographics ==
As of 2011, Tisah had a population of 2,076, in 319 households. This population was 53.4% male (1,108) and 46.6% female (968). The 0-6 age group numbered 365 (189 male and 176 female), or 17.6% of the total population. 363 residents were members of Scheduled Castes, or 17.5% of the total.

The 1981 census recorded Tisah as having a population of 1,071 people.

The 1961 census recorded Tisah (as "Tissah") as comprising 3 hamlets, with a total population of 796 people (436 male and 360 female), in 141 households and 116 physical houses. The area of the village was given as 842 acres.

== Infrastructure ==
As of 2011, Tisah had 1 primary school; it did not have any healthcare facilities. Drinking water was provided by hand pump and tube well/borehole; there were no public toilets. The village had a post office but no public library; there was at least some access to electricity for residential and agricultural (but not commercial) purposes. Streets were made of both kachcha and pakka materials.
