= Mahtauli =

Village in Uttar Pradesh, India

- Village
- Location in Uttar Pradesh, India
- Coordinates: 27.2156°N 78.87509°E
- Country: India
- State: Uttar Pradesh
- District: Mainpuri

Area
  - Total: 2.294 km^{2} (0.886 sq mi)

Population (2011)
  - Total: 1,609
  - Density: 701.4/km^{2} (1,817/sq mi)
- Time zone: UTC+5:30 (IST)

Mahtauli (Mahtaulī) is a village in Ghiror block of Mainpuri district, Uttar Pradesh. As of 2011, it has a population of 1,609, in 283 households.

== Demographics ==
As of 2011, Mahtauli had a population of 1,609, in 283 households. This population was 54.1% male (871) and 45.9% female (738). The 0-6 age group numbered 259 (149 male and 110 female), or 16.1% of the total population. 453 residents were members of Scheduled Castes, or 28.2% of the total.

The 1961 census recorded Mahtauli (as "Mahtayli") as comprising 1 hamlet, with a total population of 524 people (294 male and 230 female), in 95 households and 80 physical houses. The area of the village was given as 568 acres.

== Infrastructure ==
As of 2011, Mahtauli had one primary school. It did not have any type of healthcare facility. Drinking water was provided by well, hand pump, and tube well; there were no public toilets. The village had no post office or public library; there was at least some access to electricity for all purposes. There was no public library. Streets were made of a mix of both kachcha and pakka materials.
