= Shahjahanpur, Ghiror =

Village in Uttar Pradesh, India

Shahjahanpur
- Village
- Location in Uttar Pradesh, India
- Coordinates: 27.22106°N 78.7794°E
- Country: India
- State: Uttar Pradesh
- District: Mainpuri

Area
  - Total: 7.227 km^{2} (2.790 sq mi)

Population (2011)
  - Total: 4,674
  - Density: 646.7/km^{2} (1,675/sq mi)
- Time zone: UTC+5:30 (IST)

Shahjahanpur (Śāhjahā̃pur) is a village in Ghiror block of Mainpuri district, Uttar Pradesh. As of 2011, it had a population of 4,674, in 763 households.

== Demographics ==
As of 2011, Shahjahanpur had a population of 4,674, in 763 households. This population was 54.2% male (2,532) and 45.8% female (2,142). The 0-6 age group numbered 723 (396 male and 327 female), or 15.5% of the total population. 315 residents were members of Scheduled Castes, or 6.7% of the total.

The 1981 census recorded Shahjahanpur as having a population of 2,807 people, in 462 households.

The 1961 census recorded Shahjahanpur as comprising 4 hamlets, with a total population of 1,903 people (1,037 male and 866 female), in 478 households and 374 physical houses. The area of the village was given as 1,364 acres.

== Infrastructure ==
As of 2011, Shahjahanpur had 1 primary school and 1 primary health centre. Drinking water was provided by hand pump and tube well/borehole; there were no public toilets. The village did not have a post office or public library; there was at least some access to electricity for all purposes. Streets were made of both kachcha and pakka materials.
