= Dhaurasi =

Village in Uttar Pradesh, India

- Village
- Location in Uttar Pradesh, India
- Coordinates: 27.24337°N 78.75677°E
- Country: India
- State: Uttar Pradesh
- District: Mainpuri

Area
  - Total: 2.203 km^{2} (0.851 sq mi)

Population (2011)
  - Total: 1,813
  - Density: 823.0/km^{2} (2,131/sq mi)
- Time zone: UTC+5:30 (IST)
- PIN: 205121

Dhaurasi (Dhaurāsī) is a village in Ghiror block of Mainpuri district, Uttar Pradesh. As of 2011, it has a population of 1,813, in 263 households.

== Demographics ==
As of 2011, Dhaurasi had a population of 1,813, in 263 households. This population was 52.8% male (958) and 47.2% female (855). The 0-6 age group numbered 338 (178 male and 160 female), or 18.6% of the total population. 326 residents were members of Scheduled Castes, or 18.0% of the total.

The 1981 census recorded Dhaurasi as having a population of 611 people, in 92 households.

The 1961 census recorded Dhaurasi as comprising 1 hamlet, with a total population of 611 people (315 male and 296 female), in 104 households and 78 physical houses. The area of the village was given as 685 acres.

== Infrastructure ==
As of 2011, Dhaurasi had 2 primary schools; it did not have any healthcare facilities. Drinking water was provided by hand pump and tube well/borehole; there were no public toilets. The village did not have a post office or public library; there was at least some access to electricity for all purposes. Streets were made of both kachcha and pakka materials.
