= Oi, Mainpuri =

Village in Uttar Pradesh, India

Oi
- Village
- Location in Uttar Pradesh, India
- Coordinates: 27.22888°N 78.79656°E
- Country: India
- State: Uttar Pradesh
- District: Mainpuri

Area
  - Total: 4.961 km^{2} (1.915 sq mi)

Population (2011)
  - Total: 3,665
  - Density: 738.8/km^{2} (1,913/sq mi)
- Time zone: UTC+5:30 (IST)

Oi (Oy), also spelled Oya, is a village in Ghiror block of Mainpuri district, Uttar Pradesh. As of 2011, it has a population of 3,665, in 587 households.

== Demographics ==
As of 2011, Oi had a population of 3,665, in 587 households. This population was 54.6% male (2,002) and 45.4% female (1,663). The 0-6 age group numbered 613 (333 male and 280 female), or 16.7% of the total population. 197 residents were members of Scheduled Castes, or 5.4% of the total.

The 1981 census recorded Oi as having a population of 2,147 people, in 370 households.

The 1961 census recorded Oi as comprising 2 hamlets, with a total population of 1,466 people (821 male and 645 female), in 281 households and 157 physical houses. The area of the village was given as 1,202 acres.

== Infrastructure ==
As of 2011, Oi had 2 primary schools; it did not have any healthcare facilities. Drinking water was provided by hand pump and tube well/borehole; there were no public toilets. The village had a post office but no public library; there was at least some access to electricity for all purposes. Streets were made of both kachcha and pakka materials.
