= Godhna =

Village in Uttar Pradesh, India

- Village
- Location in Uttar Pradesh, India
- Coordinates: 27.18082°N 78.81404°E
- Country: India
- State: Uttar Pradesh
- District: Mainpuri

Area
  - Total: 5.802 km^{2} (2.240 sq mi)

Population (2011)
  - Total: 2,931
  - Density: 505.2/km^{2} (1,308/sq mi)
- Time zone: UTC+5:30 (IST)

Godhna (Godhnā) is a village in Ghiror block of Mainpuri district, Uttar Pradesh. As of 2011, it has a population of 2,931, in 472 households.

== Demographics ==
As of 2011, Godhna had a population of 2,931, in 472 households. This population was 53.0% male (1,552) and 47.0% female (1,379). The 0-6 age group numbered 497 (252 male and 245 female), or 17.0% of the total population. 858 residents were members of Scheduled Castes, or 29.3% of the total.

The 1981 census recorded Godhna (as "Godhana") as having a population of 2,068 people, in 335 households.

The 1961 census recorded Godhna as comprising 9 hamlets, with a total population of 1,340 people (735 male and 605 female), in 268 households and 178 physical houses. The area of the village was given as 1,549 acres.

== Infrastructure ==
As of 2011, Godhna had 3 primary schools; it did not have any healthcare facilities. Drinking water was provided by well, hand pump, and tube well/borehole; there were no public toilets. The village had a post office but no public library; there was at least some access to electricity for domestic and agricultural purposes. Streets were made of pakka materials.
