= Bamrauli, Mainpuri =

Village in Uttar Pradesh, India

Bamrauli
- Village
- Location in Uttar Pradesh, India
- Coordinates: 27.19981°N 78.77224°E
- Country: India
- State: Uttar Pradesh
- District: Mainpuri

Area
  - Total: 2.907 km^{2} (1.122 sq mi)

Population (2011)
  - Total: 1,519
  - Density: 522.5/km^{2} (1,353/sq mi)
- Time zone: UTC+5:30 (IST)

Bamrauli (Bamraulī) is a village in Ghiror block of Mainpuri district, Uttar Pradesh. As of 2011, it had a population of 1,519, in 243 households.

== Demographics ==
As of 2011, Bamrauli had a population of 1,519, in 243 households. This population was 49.7% male (755) and 50.3% female (764). The 0-6 age group numbered 274 (129 male and 145 female), or 18.0% of the total population. 196 residents were members of Scheduled Castes, or 12.9% of the total.

The 1981 census recorded Bamrauli as having a population of 768 people, in 122 households.

The 1961 census recorded Bamrauli as comprising 2 hamlets, with a total population of 459 people (246 male and 213 female), in 78 households and 32 physical houses. The area of the village was given as 788 acres.

== Infrastructure ==
As of 2011, Bamrauli had 2 primary schools; it did not have any healthcare facilities. Drinking water was provided by hand pump and tube well/borehole; there were no public toilets. The village did not have a post office or public library; there was at least some access to electricity for all purposes. Streets were made of both kachcha and pakka materials.
