= Shahrak-e Sadra, Neyriz =

Shahrak-e Sadra شهرک صدرا
- Village
- Country: Iran
- Province: Fars
- County: Neyriz
- Bakhsh: Central
- Rural District: Rostaq

Population (2006)
  - Total: 28
- Time zone: UTC+3:30 (IRST)
  - Summer (DST): UTC+4:30 (IRDT)

Shahrak-e Sadra (Persian: شهرک صدرا, also Romanized as Shahrak-e Şadrā) is a village in Rostaq Rural District, in the Central District of Neyriz County, Fars province, Iran. At the 2006 census, its population was 28, in 8 families.
