= Muhammadpur Ghiror =

Village in Uttar Pradesh, India

- Village
- Location in Uttar Pradesh, India
- Coordinates: 27.17637°N 78.78293°E
- Country: India
- State: Uttar Pradesh
- District: Mainpuri

Area
  - Total: 3.187 km^{2} (1.231 sq mi)

Population (2011)
  - Total: 1,715
  - Density: 538.1/km^{2} (1,394/sq mi)
- Time zone: UTC+5:30 (IST)
- PIN: 205001

Muhammadpur Ghiror (Muhammadpur Ghiror) is a village in Ghiror block of Mainpuri district, Uttar Pradesh. As of 2011, it has a population of 1,715, in 288 households.

== Demographics ==
As of 2011, Muhammadpur Ghiror had a population of 1,715, in 288 households. This population was 50.0% male (857) and 50.0% female (858). The 0-6 age group numbered 253 (116 male and 137 female), or 14.75% of the total population. 405 residents were members of Scheduled Castes, or 23.6% of the total.

The 1981 census recorded Muhammadpur Ghiror as having a population of 1,005 people, in 176 households.

The 1961 census recorded Muhammadpur Ghiror as comprising 1 hamlet, with a total population of 803 people (422 male and 381 female), in 148 households and 139 physical houses. The area of the village was given as 817 acres.

== Infrastructure ==
As of 2011, Muhammadpur Ghiror had 1 primary school; it did not have any healthcare facilities. Drinking water was provided by tap, well, hand pump, and tube well/borehole; there were no public toilets. The village had a public library but no post office; there was at least some access to electricity for all purposes. Streets were made of both kachcha and pakka materials.
