= Achalpur, Mainpuri =

Village in Uttar Pradesh, India

Achalpur
- Village
- Location in Uttar Pradesh, India
- Coordinates: 27.340°N 78.81405°E
- Country: India
- State: Uttar Pradesh
- District: Mainpuri

Area
  - Total: 16.086 km^{2} (6.211 sq mi)

Population (2011)
  - Total: 4,513
  - Density: 280.6/km^{2} (726.6/sq mi)
- Time zone: UTC+5:30 (IST)
- PIN: 205263

Achalpur is a village in Ghiror block of Mainpuri district, Uttar Pradesh, India. As of 2011, it had a population of 4,513, in 669 households. It is located next to the village of Akbarpur Aunchha.

== Demographics ==
As of 2011, Achalpur had a population of 4,513, in 669 households. This population was 54.2% male (2,448) and 45.8% female (2,065). The 0-6 age group numbered 687 (371 male and 316 female), or 15.2% of the total population. 759 residents were members of Scheduled Castes, or 16.8% of the total.

The 1961 census recorded Achalpur as comprising 12 hamlets, with a total population of 2,004 people (1,061 male and 943 female), in 367 households and 325 physical houses. The area of the village was given as 4,010 acres.

== Infrastructure ==
As of 2011, Achalpur had one primary school. It did not have any type of healthcare facility. Drinking water was provided by tap, well, hand pump, and tube well; there were no public toilets. The village had a post office, as well as at least some access to electricity for all purposes. There was no public library. Streets were made of a mix of both kachcha and pakka materials.
