= Nagla Salehi =

Village in Uttar Pradesh, India

- Village
- Location in Uttar Pradesh, India
- Coordinates: 27.29099°N 78.7744°E
- Country: India
- State: Uttar Pradesh
- District: Mainpuri

Area
  - Total: 4.455 km^{2} (1.720 sq mi)

Population (2011)
  - Total: 1,520
  - Density: 341/km^{2} (884/sq mi)
- Time zone: UTC+5:30 (IST)

Nagla Salehi (Naglā Salehī), also called Nagaria, is a village in Ghiror block of Mainpuri district, Uttar Pradesh. It is located on the Kanpur branch of the Lower Ganga Canal, and a major irrigation distributary branches off from the main canal here. As of 2011, Nagla Salehi has a population of 1,520, in 263 households.

== Geography ==
Nagla Salehi is located on the Kanpur branch of the Lower Ganga Canal. There is a lock on the canal at Nagla Salehi, as well as a bridge crossing over it. A prominent left-side distributary known as the Nagaria distributary (rajbaha) branches off from the main canal at Nagla Salehi; it irrigates crops over a wide area.

== Demographics ==
As of 2011, Nagla Salehi had a population of 1,520, in 263 households. This population was 54.3% male (825) and 45.7% female (695). The 0-6 age group numbered 271 (151 male and 120 female), or 17.8% of the total population. 131 residents were members of Scheduled Castes, or 8.6% of the total.

The 1981 census recorded Nagla Salehi (as "Nagla Salihi") as having a population of 951 people, in 163 households.

The 1961 census recorded Nagla Salehi (as "Nagla Salai") as comprising 4 hamlets, with a total population of 727 people (386 male and 341 female), in 128 households and 92 physical houses. The area of the village was given as 1,152 acres.

== Infrastructure ==
As of 2011, Nagla Salehi had 1 primary school; it did not have any healthcare facilities. Drinking water was provided by hand pump; there were no public toilets. The village did not have a post office or public library; there was at least some access to electricity for domestic and agricultural purposes. Streets were made of both kachcha and pakka materials.
