= Nagla Minte =

Village in Uttar Pradesh, India

- Village
- Location in Uttar Pradesh, India
- Coordinates: 27.32016°N 78.86089°E
- Country: India
- State: Uttar Pradesh
- District: Mainpuri

Area
  - Total: 0.482 km^{2} (0.186 sq mi)

Population (2011)
  - Total: 805
  - Density: 1,670/km^{2} (4,330/sq mi)
- Time zone: UTC+5:30 (IST)

Nagla Minte (Naglā Miṇṭe) is a village in Ghiror block of Mainpuri district, Uttar Pradesh. As of 2011, it has a population of 805, in 120 households.

== Demographics ==
As of 2011, Nagla Minte had a population of 805, in 120 households. This population was 54.9% male (442) and 45.1% female (363). The 0-6 age group numbered 143 (76 male and 67 female), or 17.8% of the total population. No residents were members of Scheduled Castes.

The 1981 census recorded Nagla Minte as having a population of 439 people, in 80 households.

The 1961 census recorded Nagla Minte as comprising 1 hamlet, with a total population of 301 people (157 male and 144 female), in 52 households and 36 physical houses. The area of the village was given as 120 acres.

== Infrastructure ==
As of 2011, Nagla Minte had 2 primary schools; it did not have any healthcare facilities. Drinking water was provided by hand pump and tube well/borehole; there were no public toilets. The village had a post office and public library as well as at least some access to electricity for all purposes. Streets were made of kachcha materials.
