= Koson, Mainpuri =

Village in Uttar Pradesh, India

Koson
- Village
- Location in Uttar Pradesh, India
- Coordinates: 27.195°N 78.74426°E
- Country: India
- State: Uttar Pradesh
- District: Mainpuri

Area
  - Total: 7.932 km^{2} (3.063 sq mi)

Population (2011)
  - Total: 2,409
  - Density: 303.7/km^{2} (786.6/sq mi)
- Time zone: UTC+5:30 (IST)

Koson (Koson) is a village in Ghiror block of Mainpuri district, Uttar Pradesh. As of 2011, it has a population of 2,409, in 419 households.

== Demographics ==
As of 2011, Koson had a population of 2,409, in 419households. This population was 53.5% male (1,290) and 46.5% female (1,119). The 0-6 age group numbered 407 (199 male and 208 female), or 16.9% of the total population. 430 residents were members of Scheduled Castes, or 17.8% of the total.

The 1981 census recorded Koson as having a population of 1,607 people, in 296 households.

The 1961 census recorded Koson as comprising 3 hamlets, with a total population of 1,143 people (642 male and 501 female), in 222 households and 196 physical houses. The area of the village was given as 1,958 acres.

== Infrastructure ==
As of 2011, Koson had 1 primary school; it did not have any healthcare facilities. Drinking water was provided by hand pump; there were no public toilets. The village had a post office but no public library; there was at least some access to electricity for residential and agricultural (but not commercial) purposes. Streets were made of both kachcha and pakka materials.
