= Nagla Rama =

Village in Uttar Pradesh, India

- Village
- Location in Uttar Pradesh, India
- Coordinates: 27.24663°N 78.79117°E
- Country: India
- State: Uttar Pradesh
- District: Mainpuri

Area
  - Total: 3.333 km^{2} (1.287 sq mi)

Population (2011)
  - Total: 1,538
  - Density: 461.4/km^{2} (1,195/sq mi)
- Time zone: UTC+5:30 (IST)

Nagla Rama (Naglā Rāmā) is a village in Ghiror block of Mainpuri district, Uttar Pradesh. As of 2011, it has a population of 1,538, in 254 households.

== Demographics ==
As of 2011, Nagla Rama had a population of 1,538, in 254 households. This population was 54.4% male (837) and 45.6% female (701). The 0-6 age group numbered 163 (89 male and 74 female), or 10.6% of the total population. 124 residents were members of Scheduled Castes, or 8.1% of the total.

The 1981 census recorded Nagla Rama as having a population of 811 people, in 128 households.

The 1961 census recorded Nagla Rama as comprising 3 hamlets, with a total population of 538 people (255 male and 283 female), in 92 households and 82 physical houses. The area of the village was given as 823 acres.

== Infrastructure ==
As of 2011, Nagla Rama did not have any schools or healthcare facilities. Drinking water was provided by hand pump and tube well/borehole; there was at least one public toilet. The village had a post office but no public library; there was at least some access to electricity for all purposes. Streets were made of both kachcha and pakka materials.
