= Taharpur, Mainpuri =

Village in Uttar Pradesh, India

Taharpur
- Village
- Location in Uttar Pradesh, India
- Coordinates: 27.16973°N 78.7936°E
- Country: India
- State: Uttar Pradesh
- District: Mainpuri

Area
  - Total: 1.559 km^{2} (0.602 sq mi)

Population (2011)
  - Total: 1,386
  - Density: 889.0/km^{2} (2,303/sq mi)
- Time zone: UTC+5:30 (IST)

Taharpur (Tāharpur) is a village in Ghiror block of Mainpuri district, Uttar Pradesh. As of 2011, it had a population of 1,386, in 242 households.

== Demographics ==
As of 2011, Taharpur had a population of 1,386, in 242 households. This population was 55.0% male (762) and 45.0% female (624). The 0-6 age group numbered 205 (103 male and 102 female), or 14.8% of the total population. 748 residents were members of Scheduled Castes, or 54.0% of the total.

The 1981 census recorded Taharpur as having a population of 730 people, in 121 households.

The 1961 census recorded Taharpur as comprising 2 hamlets, with a total population of 545 people (300 male and 245 female), in 118 households and 102 physical houses. The area of the village was given as 414 acres.

== Infrastructure ==
As of 2011, Taharpur had 1 primary school; it did not have any healthcare facilities. Drinking water was provided by well, hand pump, and tube well/borehole; there was at least one public toilet. The village did not have a post office or public library; there was at least some access to electricity for all purposes. Streets were made of pakka materials.
