= Akbarpur Aunchha =

Village in Uttar Pradesh, India

- Village
- Location in Uttar Pradesh, India
- Coordinates: 27.32071°N 78.8203°E
- Country: India
- State: Uttar Pradesh
- District: Mainpuri

Area
  - Total: 16.545 km^{2} (6.388 sq mi)

Population (2011)
  - Total: 8,579
  - Density: 518.5/km^{2} (1,343/sq mi)
- Time zone: UTC+5:30 (IST)
- PIN: 205263

Akbarpur Aunchha (Akbarpur Aunchhā) is a village in Ghiror block of Mainpuri district, Uttar Pradesh, India. Built on top of an old archaeological mound, it hosts a market twice per week and a large religious fair once per year that draws thousands of visitors. As of 2011, it had a population of 8,579, in 1,410 households.

== Name ==
The name "Akbarpur" is a reference to the Mughal emperor Akbar, who is traditionally credited with founding the old fort here at the highest point. "Auncha" may refer to the elevated ("unch") nature of the site.

== History ==
Akbarpur Aunchha is at the southern end of a long khera or archaeological mound, which runs north–south for about half a mile (0.8 km). Around the turn of the 20th century, it was noted that old kankar masonry was built into then-current structures as spolia, and old brick wells and sculpture fragments were also noted. An inscription below a statue at the village's main shrine, the Rikhi Asthan on the northeast, contains the date 334 samvat. If this is a reference to the Bikram Samvat calendar, then this would date the inscription to 277 CE, but which samvat is meant here is unknown.

The Rikhi Asthan itself occupies the site of a much older shrine, but its present form dates to a rebuilding in 1873 by Chaudhri Jai Chand, from Bishangarh in Farrukhabad district, who at the time was zamindar of both Akbarpur Aunchha and the neighbouring village of Achalpur. The old shrine was left intact, but it was covered up and the entrance blocked. The shrine hosts a fair annually on the day of Chait nomi sudi (i.e. in March).

At the turn of the 20th century, Akbarpur Aunchha was noted to have a post office, school teaching in Hindi/Urdu, and a bazar. It hosted a market two days a week, which mainly dealt in grain and tobacco. There were 8 outlying hamlets surrounding the main village site. There was previously a police station here, but by 1910 it had been demoted to an "outpost". As of 1901, the village's population was 2,390. There was also some dhak woodland to the north of the village at that point, near the Rikhi Asthan.

== Demographics ==
As of 2011, Akbarpur Aunchha had a population of 8,579, in 1,410 households. This population was 54.4% male (4,669) and 45.6% female (3,910). The 0-6 age group numbered 1,467 (767 male and 700 female), or 17.1% of the total population. 2,471 residents were members of Scheduled Castes, or 28.8% of the total.

The 1961 census recorded Akbarpur Aunchha as comprising 8 hamlets, with a total population of 2,807 people (1,528 male and 1,279 female), in 532 households and 428 physical houses. The area of the village was given as 4,090 acres. A prominent fair was listed here: the Chaman Rishi-ka-Mela, held annually on Chaitra Sudi 9. This is a religious festival which had, at that time, an average attendance of about 5,000 people.

== Infrastructure ==
As of 2011, Akbarpur Aunchha had 4 primary schools and 1 medical clinic. Drinking water was provided by tap and hand pump; there were no public toilets. The village had a post office, as well as at least some access to electricity for all purposes. There was no public library. Streets were made of a mix of both kachcha and pakka materials.
