= Talibpur, Mainpuri =

Village in Uttar Pradesh, India

Talibpur
- Village
- Location in Uttar Pradesh, India
- Coordinates: 27.09926°N 78.89987°E
- Country: India
- State: Uttar Pradesh
- District: Mainpuri

Area
  - Total: 2.53 km^{2} (0.98 sq mi)

Population (2011)
  - Total: 2,699
  - Density: 1,070/km^{2} (2,760/sq mi)
- Time zone: UTC+5:30 (IST)
- PIN: 205261

Talibpur (Tālibpur) is a village in Ghiror block of Mainpuri district, Uttar Pradesh. As of 2011, it has a population of 2,699, in 448 households.

== Demographics ==
As of 2011, Talibpur had a population of 2,699, in 448 households. This population was 56.1% male (1,515) and 43.9% female (1,184). The 0-6 age group numbered 291 (156 male and 135 female), or 10.8% of the total population. 16 residents were members of Scheduled Castes, or 0.6% of the total.

The 1981 census recorded Talibpur as having a population of 2,049 people, in 348 households.

The 1961 census recorded Talibpur as comprising 2 hamlets, with a total population of 1,302 people (739 male and 563 female), in 216 households and 152 physical houses. The area of the village was given as 626 acres.

== Infrastructure ==
As of 2011, Talibpur had 1 primary school; it did not have any healthcare facilities. Drinking water was provided by well, hand pump, and tube well/borehole; there were no public toilets. The village had a post office but no public library; there was at least some access to electricity for all purposes. Streets were made of both kachcha and pakka materials.
