= Sabzuyeh, Neyriz =

Sabzuyeh سبزويه
- Village
- Location within Iran
- Coordinates: 29°03′37″N 54°35′58″E
- Country: Iran
- Province: Fars
- County: Neyriz
- Bakhsh: Central
- Rural District: Horgan

Population (2006)
  - Total: 19
- Time zone: UTC+3:30 (IRST)
  - Summer (DST): UTC+4:30 (IRDT)

Sabzuyeh (Persian: سبزويه, also Romanized as Sabzūyeh; also known as Sowzū and Sūzū) is a village in Horgan Rural District, in the Central District of Neyriz County, Fars province, Iran. At the 2006 census, its population was 19, in 5 families.
