= Badshahpur, Mainpuri =

Village in Uttar Pradesh, India

Badshahpur
- Village
- Location in Uttar Pradesh, India
- Coordinates: 27.24801°N 78.75845°E
- Country: India
- State: Uttar Pradesh
- District: Mainpuri

Area
  - Total: 4.944 km^{2} (1.909 sq mi)

Population (2011)
  - Total: 1,872
  - Density: 378.6/km^{2} (980.7/sq mi)
- Time zone: UTC+5:30 (IST)
- PIN: 205121

Badshahpur (Bādśāhpur) is a village in Ghiror block of Mainpuri district, Uttar Pradesh. As of 2011, it had a population of 1,872, in 330 households.

== Demographics ==
As of 2011, Badshahpur had a population of 1,872, in 330 households. This population was 53.8% male (1,007) and 46.2% female (865). The 0-6 age group numbered 270 (149 male and 121 female), or 14.4% of the total population. 850 residents were members of Scheduled Castes, or 45.4% of the total.

The 1981 census recorded Badshahpur as having a population of 1,312 people, in 247 households.

The 1961 census recorded Badshahpur as comprising 4 hamlets, with a total population of 1,145 people (591 male and 554 female), in 199 households and 146 physical houses. The area of the village was given as 1,200 acres.

== Infrastructure ==
As of 2011, Badshahpur had 2 primary schools; it did not have any healthcare facilities. Drinking water was provided by hand pump and tube well/borehole; there were no public toilets. The village had a post office but no public library; there was at least some access to electricity for all purposes. Streets were made of both kachcha and pakka materials.
