= Bighrai =

Village in Uttar Pradesh, India

- Village
- Location in Uttar Pradesh, India
- Coordinates: 27.21048°N 78.86685°E
- Country: India
- State: Uttar Pradesh
- District: Mainpuri

Area
  - Total: 3.236 km^{2} (1.249 sq mi)

Population (2011)
  - Total: 2,198
  - Density: 679.2/km^{2} (1,759/sq mi)
- Time zone: UTC+5:30 (IST)

Bighrai (Bighraī), also spelled Bighrayi, is a village in Ghiror block of Mainpuri district, Uttar Pradesh, India. As of 2011, it had a population of 2,198, in 352 households.

== Demographics ==
As of 2011, Bighrai had a population of 2,198, in 352 households. This population was 52.2% male (1,148) and 47.8% female (1,050). The 0-6 age group numbered 384 (207 male and 177 female), or 17.5% of the total population. 723 residents were members of Scheduled Castes, or 32.9% of the total.

The 1981 census recorded Bighrai as having a population of 977 people, in 170 households.

The 1961 census recorded Bighrai as comprising 1 hamlet, with a total population of 607 people (325 male and 282 female), in 113 households and 94 physical houses. The area of the village was given as 807 acres.

== Infrastructure ==
As of 2011, Bighrai had 1 primary school; it did not have any healthcare facilities. Drinking water was provided by hand pump and tube well/borehole; there were no public toilets. The village had a post office but no public library; there was at least some access to electricity for all purposes. Streets were made of both kachcha and pakka materials.
