= Nagla Fateh Khan =

Village in Uttar Pradesh, India

- Village
- Location in Uttar Pradesh, India
- Coordinates: 27.20932°N 78.76808°E
- Country: India
- State: Uttar Pradesh
- District: Mainpuri

Area
  - Total: 1.08 km^{2} (0.42 sq mi)

Population (2011)
  - Total: 873
  - Density: 808/km^{2} (2,090/sq mi)
- Time zone: UTC+5:30 (IST)

Nagla Fateh Khan (Naglā Fateh Khān) is a village in Ghiror block of Mainpuri district, Uttar Pradesh, India. As of 2011, it had a population of 873, in 121 households.

== Demographics ==
As of 2011, Nagla Fateh Khan had a population of 873, in 121 households. This population was 53.5% male (467) and 46.5% female (406). The 0-6 age group numbered 114 (58 male and 56 female), or 13.1% of the total population. No residents were members of Scheduled Castes.

The 1981 census recorded Nagla Fateh Khan as having a population of 428 people, in 61 households.

The 1961 census recorded Nagla Fateh Khan as comprising 1 hamlet, with a total population of 239 people (134 male and 105 female), in 40 households and 18 physical houses. The area of the village was given as 318 acres.

== Infrastructure ==
As of 2011, Nagla Fateh Khan had 2 primary schools; it did not have any healthcare facilities. Drinking water was provided by hand pump and tube well/borehole; there were no public toilets. The village had a post office but no public library; there was at least some access to electricity for all purposes. Streets were made of both kachcha and pakka materials.
