= Naseerabad =

Naseerabad (Urdu: نصیر آباد) may refer to:

- Naseerabad Karachi, Sindh a suburb of Gulberg Town in Karachi, Sindh, Pakistan
- Naseerabad, Balochistan, a division, district, and city in Balochistan, Pakistan
- Naseerabad Basti, Basti in Muzaffargarh, Punjab, Pakistan
- Naseerabad, Sindh, a tehsil in Larkana Sindh, Pakistan

== See also ==
- Nasirabad (disambiguation)
- Nasrabad (disambiguation)
