= Nagla Mahanand =

Village in Uttar Pradesh, India

- Village
- Location in Uttar Pradesh, India
- Coordinates: 27.30942°N 78.84654°E
- Country: India
- State: Uttar Pradesh
- District: Mainpuri

Area
  - Total: 0.757 km^{2} (0.292 sq mi)

Population (2011)
  - Total: 602
  - Density: 795/km^{2} (2,060/sq mi)
- Time zone: UTC+5:30 (IST)

Nagla Mahanand (Naglā Mahānand) is a village in Ghiror block of Mainpuri district, Uttar Pradesh. As of 2011, it has a population of 602, in 103 households.

== Demographics ==
As of 2011, Nagla Mahanand had a population of 602, in 103 households. This population was 52.7% male (317) and 47.3% female (285). The 0-6 age group numbered 100 (50 male and 50 female), or 16.6% of the total population. 158 residents were members of Scheduled Castes, or 26.2% of the total.

The 1961 census recorded Nagla Mahanand as comprising 1 hamlet, with a total population of 255 people (135 male and 120 female), in 47 households and 37 physical houses. The area of the village was given as 188 acres.

== Infrastructure ==
As of 2011, Nagla Mahanand had one primary school. It did not have any type of healthcare facility. Drinking water was provided by hand pump and tube well; there were no public toilets. The village had a post office and sports fields, as well as at least some access to electricity for domestic and agricultural purposes. There was no public library. Streets were mainly made of pakka materials.
