= Nagla Kanchan =

Village in Uttar Pradesh, India

- Village
- Location in Uttar Pradesh, India
- Coordinates: 27.29669°N 78.74545°E
- Country: India
- State: Uttar Pradesh
- District: Mainpuri

Area
  - Total: 5.176 km^{2} (1.998 sq mi)

Population (2011)
  - Total: 2,341
  - Density: 452.3/km^{2} (1,171/sq mi)
- Time zone: UTC+5:30 (IST)
- PIN: 205121

Nagla Kanchan (Naglā Kañchan) is a village in Ghiror block of Mainpuri district, Uttar Pradesh, India. As of 2011, it has a population of 2,341, in 407 households.

== Demographics ==
As of 2011, Nagla Kanchan had a population of 2,341, in 407 households. This population was 54.6% male (1,278) and 45.4% female (1,063). The 0-6 age group numbered 348 (177 male and 171 female), or 14.9% of the total population. 735 residents were members of Scheduled Castes, or 31.4% of the total.

The 1961 census recorded Nagla Kanchan as comprising 5 hamlets, with a total population of 1,058 people (570 male and 488 female), in 219 households and 158 physical houses. The area of the village was given as 1,426 acres.

== Infrastructure ==
As of 2011, Nagla Kanchan had one primary school. It did not have any type of healthcare facility. Drinking water was provided entirely by hand pump; there were no public toilets. The village did not have a post office or a public library; it did have at least some access to electricity for domestic and agricultural purposes. Streets were made of a mix of both kachcha and pakka materials.
