= Nagla Amarsingh =

Village in Uttar Pradesh, India

- Village
- Location in Uttar Pradesh, India
- Coordinates: 27.29342°N 78.75234°E
- Country: India
- State: Uttar Pradesh
- District: Mainpuri

Area
  - Total: 1.034 km^{2} (0.399 sq mi)

Population (2011)
  - Total: 471
  - Density: 456/km^{2} (1,180/sq mi)
- Time zone: UTC+5:30 (IST)
- PIN: 205121

Nagla Amarsingh (Naglā Amarsingh) is a village in Ghiror block of Mainpuri district, Uttar Pradesh. As of 2011, it had a population of 471, in 72 households.

== Demographics ==
As of 2011, Nagla Amarsingh had a population of 471, in 72 households. This population was 52.4% male (247) and 47.6% female (224). The 0-6 age group numbered 77 (37 male and 40 female), or 16.3% of the total population. 116 residents were members of Scheduled Castes, or 24.6% of the total.

The 1961 census recorded Nagla Amarsingh as comprising 2 hamlets, with a total population of 217 people (113 male and 104 female), in 38 households and 28 physical houses. The area of the village was given as 661 acres.

== Infrastructure ==
As of 2011, Nagla Amarsingh had one primary school. It did not have any type of healthcare facility. Drinking water was provided entirely by hand pump; there were no public toilets. The village had a post office and sports fields, as well as at least some access to electricity for domestic and agricultural purposes. There was no public library. Streets were made of a mix of both kachcha and pakka materials.
