= Chitai, Mainpuri =

Village in Uttar Pradesh, India

Chitai
- Village
- Location in Uttar Pradesh, India
- Coordinates: 27.30979°N 78.85464°E
- Country: India
- State: Uttar Pradesh
- District: Mainpuri

Area
  - Total: 2.073 km^{2} (0.800 sq mi)

Population (2011)
  - Total: 1,625
  - Density: 783.9/km^{2} (2,030/sq mi)
- Time zone: UTC+5:30 (IST)

Chitai (Chītaī), also spelled Chitayi, is a village in Ghiror block of Mainpuri district, Uttar Pradesh, India. As of 2011, it had a population of 1,625, in 253 households.

== Demographics ==
As of 2011, Chitai had a population of 1,625, in 253 households. This population was 54.0% male (878) and 46.0% female (747). The 0-6 age group numbered 279 (159 male and 120 female), or 17.2% of the total population. 59 residents were members of Scheduled Castes, or 3.6% of the total.

The 1981 census recorded Chitai as having a population of 846 people, in 130 households.

The 1961 census recorded Chitai as comprising 2 hamlets, with a total population of 623 people (330 male and 293 female), in 87 households and 36 physical houses. The area of the village was given as 524 acres.

== Infrastructure ==
As of 2011, Chitai had 1 primary school and 1 primary health centre. Drinking water was provided by tap, hand pump, and tube well/borehole; there were no public toilets. The village had a sub post office but no public library; there was at least some access to electricity for residential and agricultural (but not commercial) purposes. Streets were made of both kachcha and pakka materials.
