= Pachawar =

Village in Uttar Pradesh, India

- Village
- Location in Uttar Pradesh, India
- Coordinates: 27.26849°N 78.79076°E
- Country: India
- State: Uttar Pradesh
- District: Mainpuri

Area
  - Total: 9.834 km^{2} (3.797 sq mi)

Population (2011)
  - Total: 3,953
  - Density: 402.0/km^{2} (1,041/sq mi)
- Time zone: UTC+5:30 (IST)

Pachawar (Pachāwar), also spelled Pachaver, is a village in the Ghiror block of Mainpuri district, Uttar Pradesh, India.

== Demographics ==
As of 2011, Pachawar had a population of 3,953, in 621 households. This population was 52.2% male (2,065) and 47.8% female (1,888). The 0-6 age group numbered 714 (370 male and 344 female), or 18.1% of the total population. 961 residents were members of Scheduled Castes, or 24.3% of the total.

The 1961 census recorded Pachawar as comprising 7 hamlets, with a total population of 1,505 people (804 male and 701 female), in 283 households and 213 physical houses. The area of the village was given as 2,434 acres.

== Infrastructure ==
As of 2011, Pachawar had one primary school. It did not have any type of healthcare facility. Drinking water was provided entirely by hand pump; there were no public toilets. There was no post office or public library. There was at least some access to electricity for domestic and agricultural purposes. Streets were made of a mix of both kachcha and pakka materials.
