= Bhatani =

Village in Uttar Pradesh, India

- Village
- Location in Uttar Pradesh, India
- Coordinates: 27.20526°N 78.90124°E
- Country: India
- State: Uttar Pradesh
- District: Mainpuri

Area
  - Total: 2.578 km^{2} (0.995 sq mi)

Population (2011)
  - Total: 1,078
  - Density: 418.2/km^{2} (1,083/sq mi)
- Time zone: UTC+5:30 (IST)

Bhatani (Bhaṭānī) is a village in Ghiror block of Mainpuri district, Uttar Pradesh, India. As of 2011, it had a population of 1,078, in 173 households.

== Demographics ==
As of 2011, Bhatani had a population of 1,078, in 173 households. This population was 51.5% male (555) and 48.5% female (523). The 0-6 age group numbered 173 (91 male and 82 female), or 16.0% of the total population. 133 residents were members of Scheduled Castes, or 12.3% of the total.

The 1981 census recorded Bhatani as having a population of 891 people, in 154 households.

The 1961 census recorded Bhatani as comprising 3 hamlets, with a total population of 591 people (301 male and 299 female [sic]), in 112 households and 111 physical houses. The area of the village was given as 646 acres.

== Infrastructure ==
As of 2011, Bhatani had 1 primary school; it did not have any healthcare facilities. Drinking water was provided by hand pump and tube well/borehole; there were no public toilets. The village had a post office but no public library; there was at least some access to electricity for all purposes. Streets were made of both kachcha and pakka materials.
