= Usnida =

Village in Uttar Pradesh, India

Usnida USNIDHA THAKURO KA VILLAGE
- Village
- Nickname: USNIDHA
- Location in Uttar Pradesh, India
- Coordinates: 27.27238°N 78.74541°E
- Country: India
- State: Uttar Pradesh
- District: Mainpuri
- Founder: MR HARI SANKAR LAL CHAUHAN CREATE THIS VILLAGE IN - 1837
- Named for: USNIDHI

Government
  - Type: USNIDHA
  - Body: BASIC

Area
  - Total: 12.209 km^{2} (4.714 sq mi)

Population (2011)
  - Total: 5,802
  - Density: 475.2/km^{2} (1,231/sq mi)
- Time zone: UTC+5:30 (IST)
- PIN: 305130

Usnida (Usnidā) is a village in Ghiror block of Mainpuri district, Uttar Pradesh, India. As of 2011, it had a population of 5,802, in 926 households.total people Chouhan Thakur agriculture work, Goswami work astrology path pooja religion along with petric work

== Geography ==
Usnida is located about 34 km west of Mainpuri and 19 km north of Ghiror.

== Demographics ==
As of 2011, Usnida had a population of 5,802, in 926 households. This population was 54.9% male (3,182) and 45.1% female (2,620). The 0-6 age group numbered 928 (504 male and 424 female), or 16.0% of the total population. 430 residents were members of Scheduled Castes, or 7.4% of the total.

The 1961 census recorded Usnida as comprising 9 hamlets, with a total population of 3,147 people (1,644 male and 1,503 female), in 573 households and 412 physical houses. The area of the village was given as 2,979 acres and it had a post office at that point.

As of 1901, Usnida had a population of 2,181, of whom 1,199 were male and 982 were female. Broken down by religion, 2,099 were Hindus and 82 were Muslims. It was listed as comprising 9 hamlets, and it had a school teaching in Hindi-Urdu at that point.

== Infrastructure ==
As of 2011, Usnida had 2 primary schools. It did not have any type of healthcare facility. Drinking water was provided by tap, hand pump, and tube well; there were no public toilets. The village had a post office, as well as at least some access to electricity for domestic and agricultural purposes. There was no public library. Streets were made of a mix of both kachcha and pakka materials.
