= Kalhor Puwan =

Village in Uttar Pradesh, India

- Village
- Location in Uttar Pradesh, India
- Coordinates: 27.19811°N 78.85001°E
- Country: India
- State: Uttar Pradesh
- District: Mainpuri

Area
  - Total: 5.016 km^{2} (1.937 sq mi)

Population (2011)
  - Total: 3,899
  - Density: 777.3/km^{2} (2,013/sq mi)
- Time zone: UTC+5:30 (IST)
- PIN: 205121

Kalhor Puwan (Kalhor Puwā̃) is a village in Ghiror block of Mainpuri district, Uttar Pradesh. As of 2011, it had a population of 3,899, in 638 households.

== Demographics ==
As of 2011, Kalhor Puwan had a population of 3,899, in 638 households. This population was 53.2% male (2,073) and 46.8% female (1,826). The 0-6 age group numbered 591 (311 male and 280 female), or 15.2% of the total population. 754 residents were members of the Scheduled Castes, or 19.3% of the total.

The 1981 census recorded Kalhor Puwan as having a population of 2,028 people, in 301 households.

The 1961 census recorded Kalhor Puwan as comprising 4 hamlets, with a total population of 1,235 people (663 male and 572 female), in 208 households and 155 physical houses. The area of the village was given as 1,241 acres.

== Infrastructure ==
As of 2011, Kalhor Puwan had 2 primary schools; it did not have any healthcare facilities. Drinking water was provided by well, hand pump, and tube well/borehole; there were no public toilets. The village had a post office but no public library; there was at least some access to electricity for all purposes. Streets were made of both kachcha and pakka materials.
