= Darbah =

Village in Uttar Pradesh, India

- Village
- Location in Uttar Pradesh, India
- Coordinates: 27.19637°N 78.88485°E
- Country: India
- State: Uttar Pradesh
- District: Mainpuri

Area
  - Total: 6.24 km^{2} (2.41 sq mi)

Population (2011)
  - Total: 4,460
  - Density: 715/km^{2} (1,850/sq mi)
- Time zone: UTC+5:30 (IST)

Darbah (Darbāh), also spelled Darwah, is a village in Ghiror block of Mainpuri district, Uttar Pradesh. As of 2011, it has a population of 4,460, in 681 households.

== Demographics ==
As of 2011, Darbah had a population of 4,460, in 681 households. This population was 53.3% male (2,376) and 46.7% female (2,084). The 0-6 age group numbered 757 (398 male and 359 female), or 17.0% of the total population. 1,228 residents were members of Scheduled Castes, or 27.5% of the total.

The 1981 census recorded Darbah as having a population of 2,314 people, in 389 households.

The 1961 census recorded Darbah as comprising 6 hamlets, with a total population of 1,715 people (918 male and 797 female), in 329 households and 269 physical houses. The area of the village was given as 1,420 acres.

== Infrastructure ==
As of 2011, Darbah had 1 primary school; it did not have any healthcare facilities. Drinking water was provided by hand pump and tube well/borehole; there were no public toilets. The village had a post office but no public library; there was at least some access to electricity for all purposes. Streets were made of both kachcha and pakka materials.
