= Kalhor Pachhan =

Village in Uttar Pradesh, India

- Village
- Location in Uttar Pradesh, India
- Coordinates: 27.19395°N 78.84388°E
- Country: India
- State: Uttar Pradesh
- District: Mainpuri

Area
  - Total: 12.744 km^{2} (4.920 sq mi)

Population (2011)
  - Total: 7,348
  - Density: 576.6/km^{2} (1,493/sq mi)
- Time zone: UTC+5:30 (IST)

Kalhor Pachhan (Kalhor Pachhā̃) is a village in Ghiror block of Mainpuri district, Uttar Pradesh, India. As of 2011, it had a population of 7,348, in 1,271 households.

== Demographics ==
As of 2011, Kalhor Pachhan had a population of 7,348, in 1,271 households. This population was 52.7% male (3,876) and 47.3% female (3,472). The 0-6 age group numbered 1,268 (694 male and 574 female), or 17.3% of the total population. 1,024 residents were members of Scheduled Castes, or 13.9% of the total.

The 1981 census recorded Kalhor Pachhan as having a population of 3,568 people, in 573 households.

The 1961 census recorded Kalhor Pachhan as comprising 13 hamlets, with a total population of 2,289 people (1,212 male and 1,077 female), in 413 households and 211 physical houses. The area of the village was given as 3,152 acres.

== Infrastructure ==
As of 2011, Kalhor Pachhan had 3 primary schools; it did not have any healthcare facilities. Drinking water was provided by hand pump; there were no public toilets. The village had a post office but no public library; there was at least some access to electricity for all purposes. Streets were made of both kachcha and pakka materials.
