= Himmatpur Ujiyari =

Village in Uttar Pradesh, India

- Village
- Location in Uttar Pradesh, India
- Coordinates: 27.1605049°N 78.8155699°E
- Country: India
- State: Uttar Pradesh
- District: Mainpuri

Area
  - Total: 3.855 km^{2} (1.488 sq mi)

Population (2011)
  - Total: 1,207
  - Density: 313.1/km^{2} (810.9/sq mi)
- Time zone: UTC+5:30 (IST)

Himmatpur Ujiyari (Himmatpur Ujiyārī) is a village in Ghiror block of Mainpuri district, Uttar Pradesh, India. As of 2011, it had a population of 1,207, in 194 households.

== Demographics ==
As of 2011, Himmatpur Ujiyari had a population of 1,207, in 194 households. This population was 51.9% male (626) and 48.1% female (581). The 0-6 age group numbered 207 (121 male and 86 female), or 17.1% of the total population. 387 residents were members of Scheduled Castes, or 32.1% of the total.

The 1981 census recorded Himmatpur Ujiyari as having a population of 703 people, in 124 households.

The 1961 census recorded Himmatpur Ujiyari as comprising 2 hamlets, with a total population of 459 people (253 male and 206 female), in 72 households and 53 physical houses. The area of the village was given as 946 acres.

== Infrastructure ==
As of 2011, Himmatpur Ujiyari had 1 primary school; it did not have any healthcare facilities. Drinking water was provided by well, hand pump, and tube well/borehole; there were no public toilets. The village had a post office but no public library; there was at least some access to electricity for all purposes. Streets were made of both kachcha and pakka materials.
