= Faizpur, Mainpuri =

Village in Uttar Pradesh, India

Faizpur
- Village
- Location in Uttar Pradesh, India
- Coordinates: 27.22599°N 78.82785°E
- Country: India
- State: Uttar Pradesh
- District: Mainpuri

Area
  - Total: 9.521 km^{2} (3.676 sq mi)

Population (2011)
  - Total: 5,163
  - Density: 542.3/km^{2} (1,404/sq mi)
- Time zone: UTC+5:30 (IST)

Faizpur (Faizpur), also spelled Faijpur, is a village in the Ghiror block of Mainpuri district, Uttar Pradesh. As of 2011, it has a population of 5,163, in 868 households.

== Demographics ==
As of 2011, Faizpur had a population of 5,163, in 868 households. This population was 53.0% male (2,736) and 47.0% female (2,427). The 0-6 age group numbered 829 (423 male and 406 female), or 16.1% of the total population. 1,402 residents were members of Scheduled Castes, or 27.2% of the total.

The 1981 census recorded Faizpur as having a population of 2,858 people, in 475 households.

The 1961 census recorded Faizpur comprising 8 hamlets, with a total population of 1,868 people (1,017 male and 851 female), in 361 households and 276 physical houses. The area of the village was given as 2,383 acres.

== Infrastructure ==
As of 2011, Faizpur had 4 primary schools; it did not have any healthcare facilities. Drinking water was provided by hand pump and tube well/borehole; there were no public toilets. The village had a post office but no public library; there was at least some access to electricity for all purposes. Streets were made of both kachcha and pakka materials.
