= Nagla Punu =

Village in Uttar Pradesh, India

- Village
- Location in Uttar Pradesh, India
- Coordinates: 27.25799°N 78.79239°E
- Country: India
- State: Uttar Pradesh
- District: Mainpuri

Area
  - Total: 3.946 km^{2} (1.524 sq mi)

Population (2011)
  - Total: 1,794
  - Density: 454.6/km^{2} (1,178/sq mi)
- Time zone: UTC+5:30 (IST)
- PIN: 205121

Nagla Punu (Naglā Punū) is a village in Ghiror block of Mainpuri district, Uttar Pradesh. As of 2011, it has a population of 1,794, in 295 households.

== Demographics ==
As of 2011, Nagla Punu had a population of 1,794, in 295 households. This population was 56.4% male (1,011) and 43.6% female (783). The 0-6 age group numbered 289 (146 male and 143 female), or 16.1% of the total population. 357 residents were members of Scheduled Castes, or 19.9% of the total.

The 1981 census recorded Nagla Punu as having a population of 1,280 people, in 203 households.

The 1961 census recorded Nagla Punu as comprising 1 hamlet, with a total population of 903 people (475 male and 428 female), in 168 households and 132 physical houses. The area of the village was given as 975 acres.

== Infrastructure ==
As of 2011, Nagla Punu had 3 primary schools; it did not have any healthcare facilities. Drinking water was provided by hand pump; there were no public toilets. The village did not have a post office or public library; there was at least some access to electricity for all purposes. Streets were made of both kachcha and pakka materials.
