= Dannahar =

Village in Uttar Pradesh, India

- Village
- Location in Uttar Pradesh, India
- Coordinates: 27.21287°N 78.89403°E
- Country: India
- State: Uttar Pradesh
- District: Mainpuri

Area
  - Total: 1.52 km^{2} (0.59 sq mi)

Population (2011)
  - Total: 941
  - Density: 619/km^{2} (1,600/sq mi)
- Time zone: UTC+5:30 (IST)

Dannahar ( Dannāhār) is a village in Ghiror block of Mainpuri district, Uttar Pradesh, India. It is located on the Kanpur branch of the Lower Ganga Canal, and a bridge crosses the canal at the village. As of 2011, Dannahar had a population of 941, in 150 households.

== Geography ==
Dannahar is located on the Kanpur branch of the Lower Ganga Canal. A bridge crosses the canal here.

== Demographics ==
As of 2011, Dannahar had a population of 941, in 150 households. This population was 53.3% male (502) and 46.7% female (439). The 0-6 age group numbered 172 (95 male and 77 female), or 18.3% of the total population. 284 residents were members of Scheduled Castes, or 30.2% of the total.

The 1981 census recorded Dannahar as having a population of 486 people, in 79 households.

The 1961 census recorded Dannahar as comprising 3 hamlets, with a total population of 361 people (180 male and 181 female), in 69 households and 61 physical houses. The area of the village was given as 518 acres.

== Infrastructure ==
As of 2011, Dannahar had 1 primary school and 1 primary health centre. Drinking water was provided by hand pump and tube well; there were no public toilets. The village did not have a post office or public library; there was at least some access to electricity for domestic and agricultural purposes. Streets were made of both kachcha and pakka materials.
