= Fazilpur, Mainpuri =

Village in Uttar Pradesh, India

Fazilpur
- Village
- Location in Uttar Pradesh, India
- Coordinates: 27.14642°N 78.83985°E
- Country: India
- State: Uttar Pradesh
- District: Mainpuri

Area
  - Total: 2.118 km^{2} (0.818 sq mi)

Population (2011)
  - Total: 1,639
  - Density: 773.8/km^{2} (2,004/sq mi)
- Time zone: UTC+5:30 (IST)

Fazilpur (Fāzilpur) is a village in Ghiror block of Mainpuri district, Uttar Pradesh. As of 2011, it has a population of 1,639, in 276 households.

== Demographics ==
As of 2011, Fazilpur had a population of 1,639, in 276 households. This population was 54.0% male (855) and 46.0% female (754). The 0-6 age group numbered 291 (142 male and 149 female), or 17.75% of the total population. 275 residents were members of Scheduled Castes, or 16.8% of the total.

The 1981 census recorded Fazilpur as having a population of 858 people, in 124 households.

The 1961 census recorded Fazilpur as comprising 1 hamlet, with a total population of 700 people (388 male and 312 female), in 143 households and 74 physical houses. The area of the village was given as 560 acres.

== Infrastructure ==
As of 2011, Fazilpur had 1 primary school; it did not have any healthcare facilities. Drinking water was provided by hand pump and tube well/borehole; there were no public toilets. The village did not have a post office or public library; there was at least some access to electricity for all purposes. Streets were made of both kachcha and pakka materials.
