= Kosma Musalmin =

Village in Uttar Pradesh, India

- Village
- Location in Uttar Pradesh, India
- Coordinates: 27.1418904°N 78.8081701°E
- Country: India
- State: Uttar Pradesh
- District: Mainpuri

Area
  - Total: 13.006 km^{2} (5.022 sq mi)

Population (2011)
  - Total: 7,230
  - Density: 556/km^{2} (1,440/sq mi)
- Time zone: UTC+5:30 (IST)

Kosma Musalmin (Kosmā Musalmīn) is a village in Ghiror block of Mainpuri district, Uttar Pradesh. Its sister village is Kosma Hinud. A railway station is located close by. As of 2011, Kosma Musalmin has a population of 7,230, in 1,169 households.

== Geography ==
Kosma Musalmin is about 22.5 km southwest of Mainpuri, the district headquarters. The Kosma railway station is located about 1.5 km from here. Together with neighbouring Kosma Hinud, Kosma Musalmin makes up the historical village of Kosma. As of 1910, there were 27 hamlets between the two village units.

== Demographics ==
As of 2011, Kosma Musalmin had a population of 7,230, in 1,169 households. This population was 53.1% male (3,840) and 46.9% female (3,390). The 0-6 age group numbered 1,156 (604 male and 552 female), or 16.0% of the total population. 940 residents were members of Scheduled Castes, or 13.0% of the total.

The 1981 census recorded Kosma Musalmin (as "Kosama Musalmin") as having a population of 3,720 people, in 629 households.

The 1961 census recorded Kosma Musalmin (as "Kosma Musalman") as comprising 10 hamlets, with a total population of 2,729 people (1,438 male and 1,291 female), in 492 households and 348 physical houses. The area of the village was given as 3,303 acres.

== Infrastructure ==
As of 2011, Kosma Musalmin had 3 primary schools; it did not have any healthcare facilities. Drinking water was provided by tap, well, and hand pump; there were no public toilets. The village had a post office but no public library; there was at least some access to electricity for all purposes. Streets were made of both kachcha and pakka materials.
