= Shahzadpur, Ghiror =

Village in Uttar Pradesh, India

Shahzadpur
- Village
- Location in Uttar Pradesh, India
- Coordinates: 27.31564°N 78.72706°E
- Country: India
- State: Uttar Pradesh
- District: Mainpuri

Area
  - Total: 1.968 km^{2} (0.760 sq mi)

Population (2011)
  - Total: 602
  - Density: 306/km^{2} (792/sq mi)
- Time zone: UTC+5:30 (IST)

Shahzadpur (Shāhzādpur), also spelled Shahjadpur (Shāhjādpur), is a village in Ghiror block of Mainpuri district, Uttar Pradesh, India. As of 2011 it had a population of 602, in 90 households.

== Demographics ==
As of 2011, Shahzadpur had a population of 602, in 90 households. This population was 52.5% male (316) and 47.5% female (286). The 0-6 age group numbered 104 (56 male and 48 female), or 17.3% of the total population. 0 residents were members of Scheduled Castes.

The 1961 census recorded Shahzadpur as comprising 1 hamlet, with a total population of 160 people (89 male and 71 female), in 30 households and 20 physical houses. The area of the village was given as 487 acres.

== Infrastructure ==
As of 2011, Shahzadpur had one primary school. It did not have any type of healthcare facility. Drinking water was provided by tap, hand pump, and tube well; there were no public toilets. The village had no post office or public library; there was at least some access to electricity for domestic and agricultural purposes.Streets were made of a mix of both kachcha and pakka materials.
