= Horgan, Iran =

Village in Fars province, Iran

Horgan Persian: هرگان
- Village
- Location within Iran
- Coordinates: 29°06′13″N 54°28′05″E
- Country: Iran
- Province: Fars
- County: Neyriz
- District: Central
- Rural District: Horgan

Population (2016)
  - Total: 170
- Time zone: UTC+3:30 (IRST)

Horgan (Persian: هرگان) (Note: Also romanized as Hargān and Horgān; also known as Hārgūn, Herkān, and Horgun) is a village in, and the capital of, Horgan Rural District of the Central District of Neyriz County, Fars province, Iran.

== Demographics ==
=== Population ===
At the time of the 2006 National Census, the village's population was 100 in 25 households. The following census in 2011 counted 131 people in 35 households. The 2016 census measured the population of the village as 170 people in 56 households. It was the most populous village in its rural district.
