= Nahili =

Village in Uttar Pradesh, India

- Village
- Location in Uttar Pradesh, India
- Coordinates: 27.18949°N 78.77692°E
- Country: India
- State: Uttar Pradesh
- District: Mainpuri

Area
  - Total: 4.081 km^{2} (1.576 sq mi)

Population (2011)
  - Total: 2,014
  - Density: 493.5/km^{2} (1,278/sq mi)
- Time zone: UTC+5:30 (IST)
- PIN: 205121

Nahili (Nāhilī) is a village in Ghiror block of Mainpuri district, Uttar Pradesh, India. As of 2011, it had a population of 2,014, in 366 households.

== Demographics ==
As of 2011, Nahili had a population of 2,014, in 366 households. This population was 53.9% male (1,086) and 46.1% female (928). The 0-6 age group numbered 320 (183 male and 137 female), or 15.9% of the total population. 749 residents were members of Scheduled Castes, or 37.2% of the total.

The 1981 census recorded Nahili as having a population of 1,179 people, in 212 households.

The 1961 census recorded Nahili as comprising 2 hamlets, with a total population of 888 people (472 male and 416 female), in 161 households and 125 physical houses. The area of the village was given as 993 acres.

== Infrastructure ==
As of 2011, Nahili had 1 primary school; it did not have any healthcare facilities. Drinking water was provided by hand pump; there were no public toilets. The village had a post office but no public library; there was at least some access to electricity for residential and agricultural (but not commercial) purposes. Streets were made of both kachcha and pakka materials.
