= Lapgawan =

Village in Uttar Pradesh, India

- Village
- Location in Uttar Pradesh, India
- Coordinates: 27.17645°N 78.82668°E
- Country: India
- State: Uttar Pradesh
- District: Mainpuri

Area
  - Total: 1.840 km^{2} (0.710 sq mi)

Population (2011)
  - Total: 1,219
  - Density: 662.5/km^{2} (1,716/sq mi)
- Time zone: UTC+5:30 (IST)

Lapgawan (Lāpgawā̃) is a village in Ghiror block of Mainpuri district, Uttar Pradesh. As of 2011, it has a population of 1,219, in 188 households.

== Demographics ==
As of 2011, Lapgawan had a population of 1,219, in 188 households. This population was 49.5% male (603) and 50.5% female (616). The 0-6 age group numbered 177 (82 male and 95 female), or 14.5% of the total population. 673 residents were members of Scheduled Castes, or 55.2% of the total.

The 1981 census recorded Lapgawan as having a population of 693 people, in 106 households.

The 1961 census recorded Lapgawan as comprising 2 hamlets, with a total population of 437 people (246 male and 191 female), in 92 households and 77 physical houses. The area of the village was given as 488 acres.

== Infrastructure ==
As of 2011, Lapgawan had 1 primary school; it did not have any healthcare facilities. Drinking water was provided by hand pump and tube well/borehole; there were no public toilets. The village did not have a post office or public library; there was at least some access to electricity for all purposes. Streets were made of both kachcha and pakka materials.
