= Ahmadpur, Ghiror =

Village in Uttar Pradesh, India

Ahmadpur
- Village
- Location in Uttar Pradesh, India
- Coordinates: 27.31675°N 78.73526°E
- Country: India
- State: Uttar Pradesh
- District: Mainpuri

Area
  - Total: 2.865 km^{2} (1.106 sq mi)

Population (2011)
  - Total: 949
  - Density: 331/km^{2} (858/sq mi)
- Time zone: UTC+5:30 (IST)

Ahmadpur is a village in Ghiror block of Mainpuri district, Uttar Pradesh, India. As of 2011, it had a population of 949, in 157 households.

== Demographics ==
As of 2011, Ahmadpur had a population of 949, in 157 households. This population was 51.7% male (491) and 48.3% female (458). The 0-6 age group numbered 137 (65 male and 72 female), or 14.4% of the total population. No residents were members of Scheduled Castes.

The 1981 census recorded Ahmadpur (as "Ahamadpur") as having a population of 504 people, in 85 households.

The 1961 census recorded Ahmadpur (as "Ahamadpur") as comprising 3 hamlets, with a total population of 362 people (180 male and 182 female), in 63 households and 38 physical houses. The area of the village was given as 824 acres.

== Infrastructure ==
As of 2011, Ahmadpur had 1 primary school; it did not have any healthcare facilities. Drinking water was provided by tap, hand pump, and tube well/borehole; there were no public toilets. The village did not have a post office or public library; there was at least some access to electricity for residential and agricultural (but not commercial) purposes. Streets were made of both kachcha and pakka materials.
