= Bhugai =

Village in Uttar Pradesh, India

- Village
- Location in Uttar Pradesh, India
- Coordinates: 27.24175°N 78.80522°E
- Country: India
- State: Uttar Pradesh
- District: Mainpuri

Area
  - Total: 2.811 km^{2} (1.085 sq mi)

Population (2011)
  - Total: 764
  - Density: 272/km^{2} (704/sq mi)
- Time zone: UTC+5:30 (IST)

Bhugai (Bhugaī) is a village in Ghiror block of Mainpuri district, Uttar Pradesh, India. As of 2011, it has a population of 764, in 119 households.

== Demographics ==
As of 2011, Bhugai had a population of 764, in 119 households. This population was 54.3% male (415) and 45.7% female (349). The 0-6 age group numbered 139 (71 male and 68 female), or 18.2% of the total population. 198 residents were members of Scheduled Castes, or 25.9% of the total.

The 1981 census recorded Bhugai as having a population of 449 people, in 70 households.

The 1961 census recorded Bhugai as comprising 2 hamlets, with a total population of 378 people (209 male and 169 female), in 57 households and 44 physical houses. The area of the village was given as 695 acres.

== Infrastructure ==
As of 2011, Bhugai had 1 primary school; it did not have any healthcare facilities. Drinking water was provided by hand pump; there were no public toilets. The village had a post office but no public library; there was at least some access to electricity for residential and agricultural (but not commercial) purposes. Streets were made of both kachcha and pakka materials.
