= Kanegi =

Village in Uttar Pradesh, India

- Village
- Location in Uttar Pradesh, India
- Coordinates: 27.27238°N 78.74541°E
- Country: India
- State: Uttar Pradesh
- District: Mainpuri

Area
  - Total: 7.518 km^{2} (2.903 sq mi)

Population (2011)
  - Total: 4,490
  - Density: 597/km^{2} (1,550/sq mi)
- Time zone: UTC+5:30 (IST)
- PIN: 205121

Kanegi (Kanegī) is a village in Ghiror block of Mainpuri district, Uttar Pradesh. As of 2011, it has a population of 4,490, in 747 households.

== Demographics ==
As of 2011, Kanegi had a population of 4,490, in 747 households. This population was 53.5% male (2,404) and 46.5% female (2,086). The 0-6 age group numbered 722 (379 male and 343 female), or 16.1% of the total population. 877 residents were members of Scheduled Castes, or 19.5% of the total.

The 1961 census recorded Kanegi as comprising 10 hamlets, with a total population of 1,746 people (905 male and 841 female), in 338 households and 223 physical houses. The area of the village was given as 1,851 acres.

== Infrastructure ==
As of 2011, Kanegi had one primary school. It did not have any type of healthcare facility. Drinking water was provided entirely by hand pump; there were no public toilets. The village had a post office, as well as at least some access to electricity for domestic and agricultural purposes. There was no public library. Streets were made of a mix of both kachcha and pakka materials.
