= Bidhuna, Mainpuri =

Village in Uttar Pradesh, India

Bidhuna
- Village
- Location in Uttar Pradesh, India
- Coordinates: 27.14686°N 78.89156°E
- Country: India
- State: Uttar Pradesh
- District: Mainpuri

Area
  - Total: 6.345 km^{2} (2.450 sq mi)

Population (2011)
  - Total: 1,540
  - Density: 243/km^{2} (629/sq mi)
- Time zone: UTC+5:30 (IST)

Bidhuna (Bidhūnā) is a village in Ghiror block of Mainpuri district, Uttar Pradesh. As of 2011, it has a population of 1,540, in 257 households.

== Demographics ==
As of 2011, Bidhuna had a population of 1,540, in 257 households. This population was 54.2% male (835) and 45.8% female (705). The 0-6 age group numbered 218 (105 male and 113 female), or 14.2% of the total population. 71 residents were members of Scheduled Castes, or 4.6% of the total.

The 1981 census recorded Bidhuna as having a population of 386 people, in 59 households.

The 1961 census recorded Bidhuna as comprising 4 hamlets, with a total population of 297 people (169 male and 128 female), in 59 households and 54 physical houses. The area of the village was given as 1,573 acres.

== Infrastructure ==
As of 2011, Bidhuna had 1 primary school; it did not have any healthcare facilities. Drinking water was provided by well, hand pump, and tube well/borehole; there were no public toilets. The village did not have a post office or public library; there was at least some access to electricity for all purposes. Streets were made of both kachcha and pakka materials.
