= Deopura =

Village in Uttar Pradesh, India

Deopura Devpura
- Village
- Location in Uttar Pradesh, India
- Coordinates: 27.30222°N 78.84321°E
- Country: India
- State: Uttar Pradesh
- District: Mainpuri

Area
  - Total: 2.701 km^{2} (1.043 sq mi)

Population (2011)
  - Total: 1,651
  - Density: 611.3/km^{2} (1,583/sq mi)
- Time zone: UTC+5:30 (IST)

Deopura, also spelled Devpura (Devpurā), is a village in Ghiror block of Mainpuri district, Uttar Pradesh, India. As of 2011, it had a population of 1,651, in 263 households.

== Demographics ==
As of 2011, Deopura had a population of 1,651, in 263 households. This population was 55.7% male (920) and 44.3% female (731). The 0-6 age group numbered 280 (159 male and 121 female), or 17.0% of the total population. 215 residents were members of Scheduled Castes, or 13.0% of the total.

The 1981 census recorded Deopura as having a population of 783 people, in 137 households.

The 1961 census recorded Deopura as comprising 1 hamlet, with a total population of 553 people (303 male and 250 female), in 101 households and 69 physical houses. The area of the village was given as 666 acres.

== Infrastructure ==
As of 2011, Deopura had 1 primary school; it did not have any healthcare facilities. Drinking water was provided by hand pump and tube well/borehole; there were no public toilets. The village had a public library but no post office; there was at least some access to electricity for all purposes. Streets were made of both kachcha and pakka materials.
