= Kothiya =

Village in Uttar Pradesh, India

- Village
- Location in Uttar Pradesh, India
- Coordinates: 27.29915°N 78.72833°E
- Country: India
- State: Uttar Pradesh
- District: Mainpuri

Area
  - Total: 2.793 km^{2} (1.078 sq mi)

Population (2011)
  - Total: 509
  - Density: 182/km^{2} (472/sq mi)
- Time zone: UTC+5:30 (IST)
- PIN: 205121

Kothiya (Koṭhiyā) is a village in Ghiror block of Mainpuri district, Uttar Pradesh, India. As of 2011, it had a population of 509, in 84 households.

== Demographics ==
As of 2011, Kothiya had a population of 509, in 84 households. This population was 53.8% male (274) and 46.2% female (235). The 0-6 age group numbered 83 (46 male and 37 female), or 16.3% of the total population. 147 residents were members of Scheduled Castes, or 28.9% of the total.

The 1961 census recorded Kothiya as comprising 1 hamlet, with a total population of 165 people (89 male and 76 female), in 38 households and 33 physical houses. The area of the village was given as 685 acres.

== Infrastructure ==
As of 2011, Kothiya had one primary school. It did not have any type of healthcare facility. Drinking water was provided entirely by hand pump; there were no public toilets. The village had a post office, as well as at least some access to electricity for domestic and agricultural purposes. There was no public library. Streets were made of a mix of both kachcha and pakka materials.
