= Aurangabad, Ghiror =

Village in Uttar Pradesh, India

Aurangabad
- Village
- Location in Uttar Pradesh, India
- Coordinates: 27.31936°N 78.72663°E
- Country: India
- State: Uttar Pradesh
- District: Mainpuri

Area
  - Total: 4.337 km^{2} (1.675 sq mi)

Population (2011)
  - Total: 1,851
  - Density: 426.8/km^{2} (1,105/sq mi)
- Time zone: UTC+5:30 (IST)
- PIN: 205121

Aurangabad (Auraṅgābād) is a village in Ghiror block of Mainpuri district, Uttar Pradesh. As of 2011, it has a population of 1,851, in 313 households.

== Demographics ==
As of 2011, Aurangabad had a population of 1,851, in 313 households. This population was 54.6% male (1,011) and 45.4% female (840). The 0-6 age group numbered 299 (148 male and 151 female), or 16.2% of the total population. 749 residents were members of Scheduled Castes, or 40.5% of the total.

The 1961 census recorded Aurangabad as comprising 3 hamlets, with a total population of 1,007 people (568 male and 439 female), in 212 households and 157 physical houses. The area of the village was given as 1,126 acres.

== Infrastructure ==
As of 2011, Aurangabad had one primary school. It did not have any type of healthcare facility. Drinking water was provided by tap, hand pump, and tube well; there were no public toilets. The village had no post office and no public library; it did have at least some access to electricity for all purposes.Streets were made of a mix of both kachcha and pakka materials.
