= Kosma Hinud =

Village in Uttar Pradesh, India

- Village
- Location in Uttar Pradesh, India
- Coordinates: 27.1444°N 78.85595°E
- Country: India
- State: Uttar Pradesh
- District: Mainpuri

Area
  - Total: 13.151 km^{2} (5.078 sq mi)

Population (2011)
  - Total: 9,148
  - Density: 695.6/km^{2} (1,802/sq mi)
- Time zone: UTC+5:30 (IST)

Kosma Hinud (Kosmā Hinūd) is a village in Ghiror block of Mainpuri district, Uttar Pradesh. Its sister village is Kosma Muslimin. A railway station is located a short distance from both villages. As of 2011, Kosma Hinud has a population of 9,148, in 1,454 households.

== Geography ==
Kosma Hinud is about 22.5 km from Mainpuri, the district headquarters. The Kosma railway station is located about 1.5 km from here. Together with neighbouring Kosma Muslimin, Kosma Hinud makes up the historical village of Kosma. As of 1910, there were 27 hamlets between the two village units. A rajbaha flows through this area and irrigates most of the local farmland.

== Demographics ==
As of 2011, Kosma Hinud had a population of 9,418, in 1,454 households. This population was 53.3% male (4,879) and 46.7% female (4,269). The 0-6 age group numbered 1,450 (772 male and 678 female), or 15.9% of the total population. 877 residents were members of Scheduled Castes, or 9.6% of the total.

The 1961 census recorded Kosma Hinud (as "Kosma Hindu") as comprising 14 hamlets, with a total population of 4,324 people (2,313 male and 2,011 female), in 912 households and 634 physical houses. The area of the village was given as 3,334 acres.

As of 1901, Kosma Hinud had a population of 2,818.

== Infrastructure ==
As of 2011, Kosma Hinud had 2 primary schools and 1 medical clinic. Drinking water was provided by tap and hand pump; there were no public toilets. The village had a post office but no public library; there was at least some access to electricity for all purposes. There was no public library. Streets were made of a mix of both kachcha and pakka materials.
