= Nagla Devi, Ghiror =

Village in Uttar Pradesh, India

Nagla Devi
- Village
- Location in Uttar Pradesh, India
- Coordinates: 27.32999°N 78.85487°E
- Country: India
- State: Uttar Pradesh
- District: Mainpuri

Area
  - Total: 0.504 km^{2} (0.195 sq mi)

Population (2011)
  - Total: 686
  - Density: 1,360/km^{2} (3,530/sq mi)
- Time zone: UTC+5:30 (IST)

Nagla Devi (Naglā Devī) is a village in Ghiror block of Mainpuri district, Uttar Pradesh, India. As of 2011, it had a population of 686, in 107 households.

== Demographics ==
As of 2011, Nagla Devi had a population of 686, in 107 households. This population was 55.4% male (380) and 44.6% female (306). The 0-6 age group numbered 100 (59 male and 41 female), or 14.6% of the total population. No residents were members of Scheduled Castes.

The 1981 census recorded Nagla Devi as having a population of 378 people, in 63 households.

The 1961 census recorded Nagla Devi as comprising 1 hamlet, with a total population of 287 people (155 male and 132 female), in 50 households and 39 physical houses. The area of the village was given as 122 acres.

== Infrastructure ==
As of 2011, Nagla Devi had 1 primary school; it did not have any healthcare facilities. Drinking water was provided by hand pump and tube well/borehole; there were no public toilets. The village had a post office but no public library; there was at least some access to electricity for all purposes. Streets were made of both kachcha and pakka materials.
