= Gurahi, Mainpuri =

Village in Uttar Pradesh, India

Gurahi
- Village
- Location in Uttar Pradesh, India
- Coordinates: 27.32201°N 78.86799°E
- Country: India
- State: Uttar Pradesh
- District: Mainpuri

Area
  - Total: 2.992 km^{2} (1.155 sq mi)

Population (2011)
  - Total: 894
  - Density: 299/km^{2} (774/sq mi)
- Time zone: UTC+5:30 (IST)

Gurahi (Gurāhī) is a village in Ghiror block of Mainpuri district, Uttar Pradesh. As of 2011, it has a population of 894, in 157 households.

== Demographics ==
As of 2011, Gurahi had a population of 894, in 157 households. This population was 54.1% male (484) and 45.9% female (410). The 0-6 age group numbered 122 (70 male and 52 female), or 13.6% of the total population. 94 residents were members of Scheduled Castes, or 10.5% of the total.

The 1981 census recorded Gurahi as having a population of 660 people, in 106 households.

The 1961 census recorded Gurahi (as "Gurai") as comprising 2 hamlets, with a total population of 556 people (283 male and 273 female), in 88 households and 61 physical houses. The area of the village was given as 741 acres.

== Infrastructure ==
As of 2011, Gurahi had 1 primary school; it did not have any healthcare facilities. Drinking water was provided by hand pump and tube well/borehole; there were no public toilets. The village had a post office but no public library; there was at least some access to electricity for all purposes. Streets were made of both kachcha and pakka materials.
