= Fazel Maleki =

Iraqi Grand Ayatollah

Grand Ayatollah Fadhil al-Maliki
- فاضل المالكي
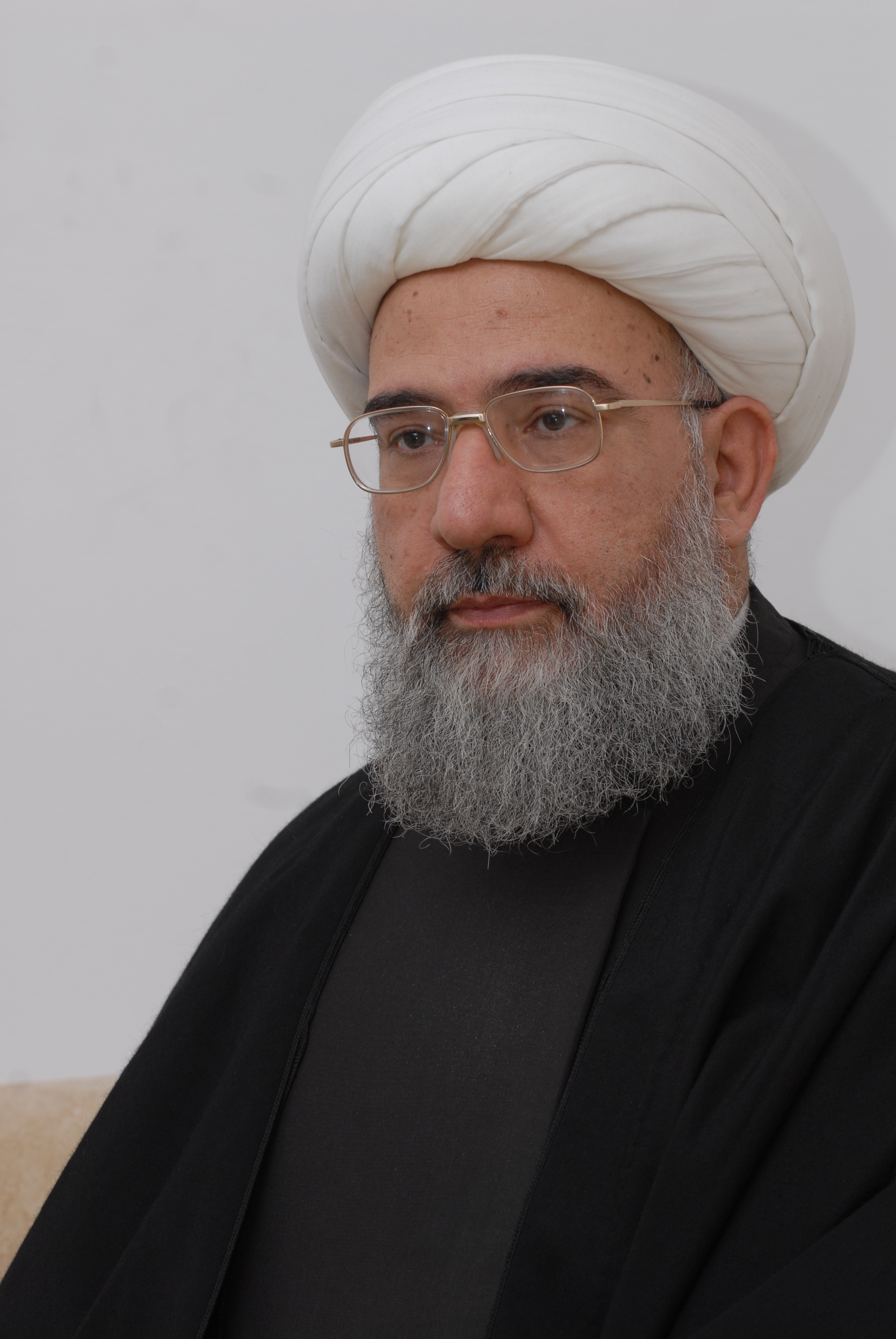
- Ayatollah Fadhil al-Maliki
- Title: Grand Ayatollah

Personal life
- Born: 1953 (age 72–73)
- Era: Modern era
- Region: Iraq
- Website: www.fadelmaleky.com (defunct)

Religious life
- Religion: Islam
- Jurisprudence: Ja`fari
- Creed: Usuli

Muslim leader
- Influenced by: Khoei, Baqir al-Sadr

Grand Ayatollah Fadhil al-Maliki (Arabic: فاضل المالكي) (born 1953) is an Iraqi Twelver Shi'a Marja and Ziyarat reciter.

He has graduated from the seminaries of Najaf, Iraq under Grand Ayatollah Abul-Qassim Khoei and Mohammad Baqir al-Sadr.

== See also ==
- List of maraji
