= Nasirabad, Khorramabad =

Nasirabad نصيرآباد
- village
- Location within Iran
- Coordinates: 33°20′59″N 48°31′51″E
- Country: Iran
- Province: Lorestan
- County: Khorramabad
- Bakhsh: Central
- Rural District: Kakasharaf

Population (2006)
  - Total: 14
- Time zone: UTC+3:30 (IRST)
  - Summer (DST): UTC+4:30 (IRDT)

Nasirabad (Persian: نصيرآباد, also Romanized as Naşīrābād) is a village in Kakasharaf Rural District, in the Central District of Khorramabad County, Lorestan Province, Iran. At the 2006 census, its population was 14, in 4 families.
