= Nasirpur, Jalandhar =

Nasirpur
- Village
- Location in Punjab, India Nasirpur (India)
- Coordinates: 31.3020239°N 74.9667897°E
- Country: India
- State: Punjab
- District: Jalandhar
- Tehsil: Shahkot

Government
  - Type: Panchayat raj
  - Body: Gram panchayat
- Elevation: 240 m (790 ft)

Population (2011)
  - Total: 781
- Sex ratio 399/382 ♂/♀

Languages
  - Official: Punjabi
- Time zone: UTC+5:30 (IST)
- ISO 3166 code: IN-PB
- Vehicle registration: PB- 08
- Website: jalandhar.nic.in

Nasirpur is a village in Shahkot in Jalandhar district of Punjab State, India. It is located 36 kilometres (22 mi) from Shahkot, 44 kilometres (27 mi) from Nakodar, 38 kilometres (24 mi) from the district headquarters Jalandhar and 196 kilometres (122 mi) from the state capital Chandigarh. The village is administrated by a sarpanch who is an elected representative of the village according to the Panchayati Raj, the system of governance in rural areas.

== Population ==
According to the 2011 census, Nasirpur has 155 households with a population of 781 (399 male and 382 female). The number of children in the age group 0-6 as 41.

== Transport ==
Shahkot Malisian station is the nearest train station. The village is 105 kilometres (65 mi) from the domestic airport in Ludhiana and the nearest international airport is in Chandigarh. Sri Guru Ram Dass Jee International Airport is 79.5 kilometres (49.4 mi) away in Amritsar.
