= Ney Pahn-e Abdollah =

Ney Pahn-e Abdollah ني پهن عبداله
- Village
- Location within Iran
- Coordinates: 34°24′50″N 45°37′27″E
- Country: Iran
- Province: Kermanshah
- County: Qasr-e Shirin
- Bakhsh: Central
- Rural District: Nasrabad

Population (2006)
  - Total: 36
- Time zone: UTC+3:30 (IRST)
  - Summer (DST): UTC+4:30 (IRDT)

Ney Pahn-e Abdollah (Persian: ني پهن عبداله, also Romanized as Ney Pahn-e ‘Abdollāh; also known as Naşrābād Seyyed Aḩmad, Pahn Abdollāh, Saīyīd Ahmad, and Seyyed Aḩmad) is a village in Nasrabad Rural District (Kermanshah Province), in the Central District of Qasr-e Shirin County, Kermanshah Province, Iran. At the 2006 census, its population was 36, in 9 families.
