= Nasirabad, Varzaqan =

Nasirabad نصيراباد
- Village
- Location within Iran
- Coordinates: 38°26′18″N 46°45′49″E
- Country: Iran
- Province: East Azerbaijan
- County: Varzaqan
- Bakhsh: Central
- Rural District: Ozomdel-e Jonubi

Population (2006)
  - Total: 41
- Time zone: UTC+3:30 (IRST)
  - Summer (DST): UTC+4:30 (IRDT)

Nasirabad (Persian: نصيراباد, also Romanized as Naşīrābād; also known as Nasr-Abad) is a village in Ozomdel-e Jonubi Rural District, in the Central District of Varzaqan County, East Azerbaijan Province, Iran. At the 2006 census, its population was 41, in 10 families.
