= Naserabad-e Talarak =

Naserabad-e Talarak ناصر آباد تلارك
- Village
- Country: Iran
- Province: Sistan and Baluchestan
- County: Khash
- Bakhsh: Nukabad
- Rural District: Nazil

Population (2006)
  - Total: 47
- Time zone: UTC+3:30 (IRST)
  - Summer (DST): UTC+4:30 (IRDT)

Naserabad-e Talarak (Persian: ناصر آباد تلارك, also Romanized as Nāşerābād-e Talārak) is a village in Nazil Rural District, Nukabad District, Khash County, Sistan and Baluchestan Province, Iran. At the 2006 census, its population was 47, in 9 families.
