= Nasirabad, Jahrom =

Nasirabad نصیرآباد
- Village
- Interactive map of Nasirabad
- Coordinates: 29°00′10″N 53°03′26.4″E
- Country: Iran
- Province: Fars
- County: Khafr
- Bakhsh: Central
- Rural District: Aliabad
- Elevation: 1,347 m (4,419 ft)

Population (2016)
  - Total: 62
- Time zone: UTC+3:30 (IRST)

Nasirabad (Persian: نصیرآباد, also Romanized as Naşīrābād, also known as Nasīrābād-e Pāīn) is a village in Aliabad Rural District of Khafr County, Fars province, Iran.

At the 2006 census, its population was 81 people, when it was in Khafr District, Jahrom County. The 2016 census measured the population of the village as 62 people in 19 households.

In 2019, the district was separated from the county in the establishment of Khafr County, and the rural district was transferred to the new Central District.
