= Nasrabad, Mashhad =

Nasrabad نصراباد
- Village
- Location within Iran
- Coordinates: 36°33′13″N 59°30′14″E
- Country: Iran
- Province: Razavi Khorasan
- County: Mashhad
- Bakhsh: Central
- Rural District: Darzab

Population (2006)
  - Total: 129
- Time zone: UTC+3:30 (IRST)
  - Summer (DST): UTC+4:30 (IRDT)

Nasrabad (Persian: نصراباد, also Romanized as Naşrābād) is a village in Darzab Rural District, in the Central District of Mashhad County, Razavi Khorasan Province, Iran. At the 2006 census, its population was 129, with 37 families.
