= Naserabad, Birjand =

Naserabad نصراباد
- Village
- Location within Iran
- Coordinates: 32°45′25″N 59°24′27″E
- Country: Iran
- Province: South Khorasan
- County: Birjand
- Bakhsh: Central
- Rural District: Baqeran

Population (2006)
  - Total: 111
- Time zone: UTC+3:30 (IRST)
  - Summer (DST): UTC+4:30 (IRDT)

Naserabad (Persian: نصراباد, also Romanized as Nāşerābād) is a village in Baqeran Rural District, in the Central District of Birjand County, South Khorasan Province, Iran. At the 2006 census, its population was 111, in 33 families.
