= Naserabad, Kurdistan =

Naserabad ناصر آباد
- Village
- Location within Iran
- Coordinates: 35°17′48″N 47°30′23″E
- Country: Iran
- Province: Kurdistan
- County: Dehgolan
- Bakhsh: Central
- Rural District: Howmeh-ye Dehgolan

Population (2006)
  - Total: 220
- Time zone: UTC+3:30 (IRST)
  - Summer (DST): UTC+4:30 (IRDT)

Naserabad (Persian: ناصر آباد, also Romanized as Nāşerābād and Naşerābād; also known as Tāzehābād) is a village in Howmeh-ye Dehgolan Rural District, in the Central District of Dehgolan County, Kurdistan Province, Iran. At the 2006 census, its population was 220, in 50 families. The village is populated by Kurds.
