= Nasrabad, Anbarabad =

Nasrabad ناصراباد
- Village
- Location within Iran
- Coordinates: 28°24′40″N 57°52′03″E
- Country: Iran
- Province: Kerman
- County: Anbarabad
- Bakhsh: Central
- Rural District: Mohammadabad

Population (2006)
  - Total: 13
- Time zone: UTC+3:30 (IRST)
  - Summer (DST): UTC+4:30 (IRDT)

Nasrabad (Persian: ناصراباد, also Romanized as Naşrābād) is a village in Mohammadabad Rural District, in the Central District of Anbarabad County, Kerman Province, Iran. At the 2006 census, its population was 13, in 4 families.
