= Nasrabad, Sarbisheh =

Nasrabad نصراباد
- Village
- Location within Iran
- Coordinates: 32°16′50″N 59°33′10″E
- Country: Iran
- Province: South Khorasan
- County: Sarbisheh
- Bakhsh: Mud
- Rural District: Naharjan

Population (2006)
  - Total: 40
- Time zone: UTC+3:30 (IRST)
  - Summer (DST): UTC+4:30 (IRDT)

Nasrabad (Persian: نصراباد, also Romanized as Naşrābād) is a village in Naharjan Rural District, Mud District, Sarbisheh County, South Khorasan Province, Iran. At the 2006 census, its population was 40, in 10 families.
