= Langabad =

Langabad لنگ اباد
- Village
- Location within Iran
- Coordinates: 28°00′22″N 57°43′06″E
- Country: Iran
- Province: Kerman
- County: Kahnuj
- Bakhsh: Central
- Rural District: Nakhlestan

Population (2006)
  - Total: 521
- Time zone: UTC+3:30 (IRST)
  - Summer (DST): UTC+4:30 (IRDT)

Langabad (Persian: لنگ اباد, also Romanized as Langābād; also known as Nāşerābād) is a village in Nakhlestan Rural District, in the Central District of Kahnuj County, Kerman Province, Iran. At the 2006 census, its population was 521, in 107 families.
