= Nasirabad, Fasa =

Village in Fars province, Iran

Nasirabad Persian: نصيراباد
- Village
- Location within Iran
- Coordinates: 28°41′33″N 53°52′08″E
- Country: Iran
- Province: Fars
- County: Fasa
- District: Shibkaveh
- Rural District: Miyan Deh

Population (2016)
  - Total: 1,437
- Time zone: UTC+3:30 (IRST)

Nasirabad (Persian: نصيراباد) (Note: Also romanized as Naşīrābād) is a village in Miyan Deh Rural District of Shibkaveh District, Fasa County, Fars province, Iran.

== Demographics ==
=== Population ===
At the time of the 2006 National Census, the village's population was 1,616 in 349 households. The following census in 2011 counted 1,570 people in 420 households. The 2016 census measured the population of the village as 1,437 people in 420 households. It was the most populous village in its rural district.
