= Nasirabad, Neyriz =

Village in Fars province, Iran

Nasirabad Persian: نصيراباد
- Village
- Location within Iran
- Coordinates: 29°13′27″N 54°13′41″E
- Country: Iran
- Province: Fars
- County: Neyriz
- District: Central
- Rural District: Rostaq

Population (2016)
  - Total: 408
- Time zone: UTC+3:30 (IRST)

Nasirabad (Persian: نصيراباد) (Note: Also romanized as Naşīrābād; also known as Naşīrābād-e Avval and Naşrābād) is a village in, and the capital of, Rostaq Rural District of the Central District of Neyriz County, Fars province, Iran.

== Demographics ==
=== Population ===
At the time of the 2006 National Census, the village's population wa 390 in 97 households. The following census in 2011 counted 440 people in 134 households. The 2016 census measured the population of the village as 408 people in 115 households.
