= Naserabad-e Chahgavari =

Naserabad-e Chahgavari ناصراباد چه گواري
- Village
- Location within Iran
- Coordinates: 28°41′53″N 58°54′17″E
- Country: Iran
- Province: Kerman
- County: Rigan
- Bakhsh: Gonbaki
- Rural District: Gonbaki

Population (2006)
  - Total: 609
- Time zone: UTC+3:30 (IRST)
  - Summer (DST): UTC+4:30 (IRDT)

Naserabad-e Chahgavari (Persian: ناصراباد چه گواري, also Romanized as Nāşerābād-e Chahgavārī; also known as Nāşerābād) is a village in Gonbaki Rural District, Gonbaki District, Rigan County, Kerman Province, Iran. At the 2006 census, its population was 609, in 127 families.
