= Nasirabad, West Azerbaijan =

Nasirabad نصيراباد
- Village
- Location within Iran
- Coordinates: 37°13′08″N 45°16′37″E
- Country: Iran
- Province: West Azerbaijan
- County: Urmia
- Bakhsh: Central
- Rural District: Dul

Population (2006)
  - Total: 416
- Time zone: UTC+3:30 (IRST)
  - Summer (DST): UTC+4:30 (IRDT)

Nasirabad (Persian: نصيراباد, also Romanized as Naşīrābād) is a village in Dul Rural District, in the Central District of Urmia County, West Azerbaijan Province, Iran. At the 2006 census, its population was 416, in 76 families.
