= Naserabad-e Chah-e Malek =

Naserabad-e Chah-e Malek ناصرابادچاه ملك
- Village
- Location within Iran
- Coordinates: 28°37′10″N 59°07′37″E
- Country: Iran
- Province: Kerman
- County: Rigan
- Bakhsh: Central
- Rural District: Rigan

Population (2006)
  - Total: 471
- Time zone: UTC+3:30 (IRST)
  - Summer (DST): UTC+4:30 (IRDT)

Naserabad-e Chah-e Malek (Persian: ناصرابادچاه ملك, also Romanized as Nāşerābād-e Chāh-e Malek; also known as Nāşerābād) is a village in Rigan Rural District, in the Central District of Rigan County, Kerman Province, Iran. At the 2006 census, its population was 471, in 98 families.
