= Naserabad, Shahdad =

Naserabad ناصراباد
- Village
- Location within Iran
- Coordinates: 30°23′08″N 57°32′42″E
- Country: Iran
- Province: Kerman
- County: Kerman
- Bakhsh: Shahdad
- Rural District: Sirch

Population (2006)
  - Total: 22
- Time zone: UTC+3:30 (IRST)
  - Summer (DST): UTC+4:30 (IRDT)

Naserabad (Persian: ناصراباد, also Romanized as Nāşerābād and Naşrābād) is a village in Sirch Rural District, Shahdad District, Kerman County, Kerman Province, Iran. At the 2006 census, its population was 22, in 7 families.
