= Nasirpur, Ghiror =

Village in Uttar Pradesh, India

Nasirpur
- Village
- Location in Uttar Pradesh, India
- Coordinates: 27.27278°N 78.82326°E
- Country: India
- State: Uttar Pradesh
- District: Mainpuri

Area
  - Total: 7.512 km^{2} (2.900 sq mi)

Population (2011)
  - Total: 2,626
  - Density: 349.6/km^{2} (905.4/sq mi)
- Time zone: UTC+5:30 (IST)
- PIN: 205121

Nasirpur (Nasīrpur) is a village in Ghiror block of Mainpuri district, Uttar Pradesh. As of 2011, it had a population of 2,626, in 454 households.

== Demographics ==
As of 2011, Nasirpur had a population of 2,626, in 454 households. This population was 53.6% male (1,407) and 46.4% female (1,219). The 0-6 age group numbered 469 (246 male and 223 female), or 17.9% of the total population. 487 residents were members of Scheduled Castes, or 18.5% of the total.

The 1981 census recorded Nasirpur as having a population of 1,550 people, in 234 households.

The 1961 census recorded Nasirpur as comprising 4 hamlets, with a total population of 1,156 people (655 male and 501 female), in 207 households and 183 physical houses. The area of the village was given as 1,820 acres.

== Infrastructure ==
As of 2011, Nasirpur had 2 primary schools; it did not have any healthcare facilities. Drinking water was provided by hand pump; there were no public toilets. The village had a post office but no public library; there was at least some access to electricity for all purposes. Streets were made of both kachcha and pakka materials.
