= Sabzuiyeh, Kerman =

Sabzuiyeh سبزوئيه
- Village
- Location within Iran
- Coordinates: 29°24′36″N 57°46′16″E
- Country: Iran
- Province: Kerman
- County: Bam
- Bakhsh: Central
- Rural District: Howmeh

Population (2006)
  - Total: 138
- Time zone: UTC+3:30 (IRST)
  - Summer (DST): UTC+4:30 (IRDT)

Sabzuiyeh (Persian: سبزوئيه, also Romanized as Sabzū’īyeh and Sabzoo’eyeh; also known as Sabzu) is a village in Howmeh Rural District, in the Central District of Bam County, Kerman Province, Iran. At the 2006 census, its population was 138, in 36 families.
