= Rutak, Khash =

Rutak روتك
- Village
- Interactive map of Rutak
- Country: Iran
- Province: Sistan and Baluchestan
- County: Khash
- Bakhsh: Central
- Rural District: Poshtkuh

Population (2006)
  - Total: 531
- Time zone: UTC+03:30 (IRST)
  - Summer (DST): UTC+04:30 (IRDT)

Rutak (Persian: روتك, also Romanized as Nāşrābād-e Rūtak) is a village in Poshtkuh Rural District, in the Central District of Khash County, Sistan and Baluchestan Province, Iran. At the 2006 census, its population was 531, in 88 families.
