= Nasirabad, Shurab-e Tangazi =

Nasirabad نصيراباد
- Village
- Location within Iran
- Coordinates: 32°22′41″N 50°18′33″E
- Country: Iran
- Province: Chaharmahal and Bakhtiari
- County: Kuhrang
- Bakhsh: Central
- Rural District: Shurab-e Tangazi
- Established: 1964

Population (2025)
  - Total: 343
- Time zone: UTC+3:30 (IRST)
  - Summer (DST): UTC+4:30 (IRDT)

Nasirabad (Persian: نصيراباد, also Romanized as Naşīrābād) is a village in Shurab-e Tangazi Rural District, in the Central District of Kuhrang County, Chaharmahal and Bakhtiari Province, Iran. At the 2025 census, its population us 343, in 42 families. The village is populated by Lurs.
