= Nasrabad, Kerman =

Nasrabad نصراباد
- Village
- Location within Iran
- Coordinates: 30°24′36″N 57°22′12″E
- Country: Iran
- Province: Kerman
- County: Kerman
- Bakhsh: Central
- Rural District: Derakhtengan

Population (2006)
  - Total: 22
- Time zone: UTC+3:30 (IRST)
  - Summer (DST): UTC+4:30 (IRDT)

Nasrabad (Persian: نصراباد, also Romanized as Naṣrābād) is a village in Derakhtengan Rural District, in the Central District of Kerman County, Kerman Province, Iran. According to the 2006 census, its population was 22, in 6 families.
