= Nasrabad, Razaviyeh =

Nasrabad نصراباد
- Village
- Location within Iran
- Coordinates: 36°08′08″N 60°01′04″E
- Country: Iran
- Province: Razavi Khorasan
- County: Mashhad
- Bakhsh: Razaviyeh
- Rural District: Abravan

Population (2006)
  - Total: 546
- Time zone: UTC+3:30 (IRST)
  - Summer (DST): UTC+4:30 (IRDT)

Nasrabad (Persian: نصراباد, also Romanized as Naşrābād) is a village in Abravan Rural District, Razaviyeh District, Mashhad County, Razavi Khorasan Province, Iran. At the 2006 census, its population was 546, in 135 families.
