= Naserabad, Khuzestan =

Naserabad ناصراباد
- Village
- Location within Iran
- Coordinates: 30°23′53″N 49°43′25″E
- Country: Iran
- Province: Khuzestan
- County: Hendijan
- Bakhsh: Cham Khalaf-e Isa
- Rural District: Cham Khalaf-e Isa

Population (2006)
  - Total: 569
- Time zone: UTC+3:30 (IRST)
  - Summer (DST): UTC+4:30 (IRDT)

Naserabad (Persian: ناصراباد, also Romanized as Nāşerābād; also known as Nāşīrābād) is a village in Cham Khalaf-e Isa Rural District, Cham Khalaf-e Isa District, Hendijan County, Khuzestan Province, Iran. At the 2006 census, its population was 569, in 110 families.
