= Nasirabad, Qazvin =

Nasirabad نصيراباد
- Village
- Location within Iran
- Coordinates: 36°36′34″N 49°13′44″E
- Country: Iran
- Province: Qazvin
- County: Qazvin
- Bakhsh: Tarom Sofla
- Rural District: Khandan

Population (2006)
  - Total: 19
- Time zone: UTC+3:30 (IRST)
  - Summer (DST): UTC+4:30 (IRDT)

Nasirabad (Persian: نصيراباد, also Romanized as Naşīrābād; also known as Nāşerābād and Naşrābād) is a village in Khandan Rural District, Tarom Sofla District, Qazvin County, Qazvin Province, Iran. At the 2006 census, its population was 19, in 10 families.
