= Nasirabad, Nishapur =

Nasirabad نصيراباد
- Village
- Location within Iran
- Coordinates: 36°33′34″N 58°33′53″E
- Country: Iran
- Province: Razavi Khorasan
- County: Nishapur
- Bakhsh: Central
- Rural District: Binalud

Population (2006)
  - Total: 195
- Time zone: UTC+3:30 (IRST)
  - Summer (DST): UTC+4:30 (IRDT)

Nasirabad (Persian: نصيراباد, also Romanized as Naşīrābād and Nasīr Ābād; also known as Naşrābād and Naşrābād-e ‘Olyā) is a village in Binalud Rural District, in the Central District of Nishapur County, Razavi Khorasan Province, Iran. At the 2006 census, its population was 195, in 49 families.
