= Naserabad, Hamadan =

Naserabad ناصراباد
- Village
- Location within Iran
- Coordinates: 35°19′18″N 48°26′45″E
- Country: Iran
- Province: Hamadan
- County: Kabudarahang
- Bakhsh: Central
- Rural District: Sardaran

Population (2006)
  - Total: 450
- Time zone: UTC+3:30 (IRST)
  - Summer (DST): UTC+4:30 (IRDT)

Naserabad (Persian: ناصراباد, also Romanized as Nāşerābād; also known as Naser Abad Mehraban and Nāsirābād) is a village in Sardaran Rural District, in the Central District of Kabudarahang County, Hamadan Province, Iran. At the 2006 census, its population was 450, in 115 families.
