= Miyan Deh Rural District =

Rural district in Fars province, Iran

Miyan Deh Rural District Persian: دهستان ميانده
- Rural District
- Location within Iran
- Coordinates: 28°39′38″N 53°56′07″E
- Country: Iran
- Province: Fars
- County: Fasa
- District: Shibkaveh
- Capital: Miyanshahr

Population (2016)
  - Total: 4,900
- Time zone: UTC+3:30 (IRST)

Miyan Deh Rural District (Persian: دهستان ميانده) is in Shibkaveh District of Fasa County, Fars province, Iran. It is administered from the city of Miyanshahr. (Note: Formerly the village of Miyan Deh)

== Demographics ==
=== Population ===
At the time of the 2006 National Census, the rural district's population was 10,898 in 2,418 households. There were 11,152 inhabitants in 2,946 households at the following census of 2011. The 2016 census measured the population of the rural district as 4,900 in 1,421 households, by which time two villages had merged to form the new city of Miyanshahr. The most populous of its 38 villages was Nasirabad, with 1,437 people.
