= Horgan Rural District =

Rural district in Fars province, Iran

Horgan Rural District Persian: دهستان هرگان
- Rural District
- Location within Iran
- Coordinates: 29°02′51″N 54°32′39″E
- Country: Iran
- Province: Fars
- County: Neyriz
- District: Central
- Capital: Horgan

Population (2016)
  - Total: 1,170
- Time zone: UTC+3:30 (IRST)

Horgan Rural District (Persian: دهستان هرگان) is in the Central District of Neyriz County, Fars province, Iran. Its capital is the village of Horgan.

== Demographics ==
=== Population ===
At the time of the 2006 National Census, the rural district's population was 1,121 in 283 households. There were 884 inhabitants in 244 households at the following census of 2011. The 2016 census measured the population of the rural district as 1,170 in 381 households. The most populous of its 43 villages was Horgan, with 170 people.
