= Rostaq Rural District (Neyriz County) =

Rural district in Fars province, Iran

Rostaq Rural District Persian: دهستان رستاق
- Rural District
- Location within Iran
- Coordinates: 29°15′40″N 54°13′48″E
- Country: Iran
- Province: Fars
- County: Neyriz
- District: Central
- Capital: Nasirabad

Population (2016)
  - Total: 5,606
- Time zone: UTC+3:30 (IRST)

Rostaq Rural District (Persian: دهستان رستاق) is in the Central District of Neyriz County, Fars province, Iran. Its capital is the village of Nasirabad.

== Demographics ==
=== Population ===
At the time of the 2006 National Census, the rural district's population was 5,796 in 1,396 households. There were 5,796 inhabitants in 1,562 households at the following census of 2011. The 2016 census measured the population of the rural district as 5,606 in 1,683 households. The most populous of its 47 villages was Tall Mahtabi, with 1,050 people.
