= Central District (Neyriz County) =

District in Fars province, Iran

Central District (Neyriz County) Persian: بخش مرکزی شهرستان نی‌ریز
- District
- Location within Iran
- Coordinates: 29°09′57″N 54°24′15″E
- Country: Iran
- Province: Fars
- County: Neyriz
- Capital: Neyriz

Population (2016)
  - Total: 56,626
- Time zone: UTC+3:30 (IRST)

The Central District of Neyriz County (Persian: بخش مرکزی شهرستان نی‌ریز) is in Fars province, Iran. Its capital is the city of Neyriz.

== Demographics ==
=== Population ===
At the time of the 2006 National Census, the district's population was 52,097 in 13,649 households. The following census in 2011 counted 56,971 people in 16,222 households. The 2016 census measured the population of the district as 56,626 inhabitants in 17,402 households.

=== Administrative divisions ===
Central District (Neyriz County) Population
Administrative Divisions	2006	2011	2016
Horgan RD	1,121	884	1,170
Rostaq RD	5,796	5,796	5,606
Neyriz (city)	45,180	50,291	49,850
Total	52,097	56,971	56,626
RD = Rural District
