= Baqerabad =

Bagherabad or Baqerabad or Bagher Abad (Persian: باقرآباد) may refer to the following places in Iran:

== Ardabil Province ==
- Baqarabad, Ardabil, a village in Ardabil County

== Fars Province ==
- Baqerabad, Abadeh, a village in Abadeh County
- Baqerabad, Abadeh Tashk, a village in Neyriz County
- Baqerabad, Poshtkuh, a village in Neyriz County
- Baqerabad, Sepidan, a village in Sepidan County
- Baqerabad, Hamaijan, a village in Sepidan County

== Golestan Province ==
- Baqerabad, Aliabad, a village in Aliabad County
- Baqerabad, Minudasht, a village in Minudasht County
- Baqerabad, Ramian, a village in Ramian County

== Hamadan Province ==
- Baqerabad, Hamadan, a village in Tuyserkan County

== Isfahan Province ==
- Baqerabad, Ardestan, a village in Ardestan County
- Baqerabad, Zavareh, a village in Ardestan County
- Baqerabad, Isfahan, a village in Isfahan County

== Kerman Province ==
- Baqerabad, Bardsir, a village in Bardsir County
- Baqerabad, Jiroft, a village in Jiroft County
- Baqerabad-e Tabatabayi, a village in Jiroft County
- Baqerabad 2, a village in Kerman County
- Baqerabad-e Rig, a village in Kerman County
- Baqerabad, Rud Ab, a village in Narmashir County
- Baqerabad, Rafsanjan, a village in Rafsanjan County
- Baqerabad, Rigan, a village in Rigan County

== Kermanshah Province ==
- Baqerabad, Eslamabad-e Gharb, a village in Eslamabad-e Gharb County
- Baqerabad-e Olya, a village in Eslamabad-e Gharb County
- Baqerabad-e Sofla, a village in Eslamabad-e Gharb County
- Baqerabad, Harsin, a village in Harsin County
- Baqerabad, Kermanshah, a village in Kermanshah County
- Baqerabad Meyanrud, a village in Kermanshah County
- Baqerabad, Sonqor, a village in Sonqor County
- Baqerabad, alternate name of Sameleh, a village in Sonqor County

== Khuzestan Province ==
- Baqerabad, Khuzestan, a village in Andika County

== Kurdistan Province ==
- Baqerabad, Bijar, a village in Bijar County
- Baqerabad, Divandarreh, a village in Divandarreh County

== Lorestan Province ==
- Baqerabad, Lorestan, a village in Aligudarz County

== Markazi Province ==
- Baqerabad, Mahallat, a village in Mahallat County
- Baqerabad, Shazand, a village in Shazand County
- Baqerabad Rural District, in Mahallat County

== Qazvin Province ==
- Baqerabad, Dashtabi, a village in Qazvin Province, Iran
- Baqerabad-e Kord, a village in Qazvin Province, Iran
- Baqerabad-e Tork, a village in Qazvin Province, Iran

== Qom Province ==
- Baqerabad, Qom, a village in Qom Province, Iran
- Baqerabad, Jafarabad, a village in Qom Province, Iran

== Razavi Khorasan Province ==
- Baqerabad, Davarzan, a village in Davarzan County

== Sistan and Baluchestan Province ==
- Baqerabad, Sistan and Baluchestan, a village in Hirmand County

== Tehran Province ==
- Baqerabad, former name of Baqershahr, a city in Tehran Province, Iran

== Yazd Province ==
- Bagherabad, Bafgh, a village in Bafgh County
