= Darvishabad =

Darvishabad or Dervishabad (Persian: درويش اباد) may refer to:

- Darvishabad, Fars
- Darvishabad, Golestan
- Darvishabad, Khuzestan
- Darvishabad, Firuzabad, Lorestan Province
- Darvishabad, Khorramabad, Lorestan Province
- Darvishabad, Selseleh, Lorestan Province
- Darvishabad, Mazandaran
- Darvishabad, South Khorasan
- Darvishabad, West Azerbaijan
