= Dehmurd =

Village in Fars province, Iran

Dehmurd Persian: دهمورد
- Village
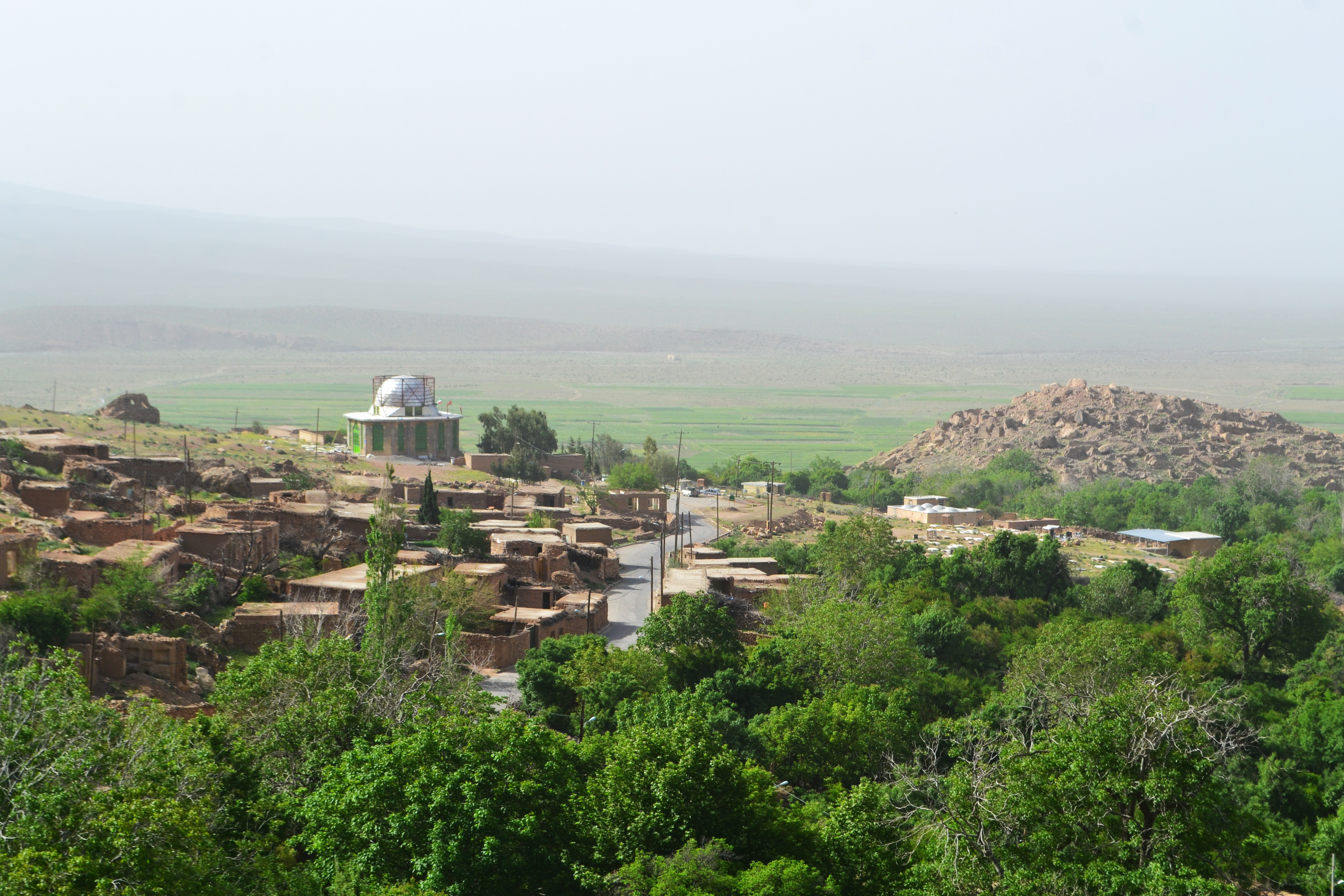
- The village of Dahmurd

- Location within Iran
- Coordinates: 29°44′59″N 54°00′26″E
- Country: Iran
- Province: Fars
- County: Bakhtegan
- District: Central
- Rural District: Bakhtegan

Population (2016)
  - Total: 2,327
- Time zone: UTC+3:30 (IRST)

Dehmurd (Persian: دهمورد) (Note: Also romanized as Deh Moord, Dehmūrd, and Deh-e Mūrd; also known as Deh Mon) is a village in Bakhtegan Rural District of the Central District of Bakhtegan County, Fars province, Iran.

== Demographics ==
=== Population ===
At the time of the 2006 National Census, the village's population was 2,240 in 567 households, when it was in the former Abadeh Tashk District of Neyriz County. The following census in 2011 counted 2,622 people in 710 households. The 2016 census measured the population of the village as 2,327 people in 707 households. It was the most populous village in its rural district.

In July 2018, the district was separated from the county in the establishment of Bakhtegan County, which was divided into two districts of two rural districts each, with the city of Abadeh Tashk as its capital and only city at the time. Bakhtegan Rural District was transferred to the new Central District.
