= Chah Gaz =

Chah Gaz (Persian: چاه گز) may refer to:

- Chah Gaz, Fars
- Chah Gaz Rural District, an administrative division of Bakhtegan County, Fars province
- Chah Gaz, Hormozgan
- Chah Gaz, Kerman
- Chah Gaz, Yazd
