= Qasemabad, Bakhtegan =

Village in Fars province, Iran

Qasemabad Persian: قاسم اباد
- Village
- Location within Iran
- Coordinates: 29°30′11″N 54°06′57″E
- Country: Iran
- Province: Fars
- County: Bakhtegan
- District: Hana
- Rural District: Hana

Population (2016)
  - Total: 697
- Time zone: UTC+3:30 (IRST)

Qasemabad (Persian: قاسم اباد) (Note: Also romanized as Qāsemābād) is a village in, and the capital of, Hana Rural District of Hana District, Bakhtegan County, Fars province, Iran. The previous capital of the rural district was the village of Tom Shuli, now a city.

== Demographics ==
=== Population ===
At the time of the 2006 National Census, the village's population was 643 in 146 households, when it was in the former Abadeh Tashk District of Neyriz County. The following census in 2011 counted 753 people in 200 households. The 2016 census measured the population of the village as 697 people in 211 households.

In 2018, the district was separated from the county in the establishment of Bakhtegan County, and Hana Rural District was transferred to the new Hana District.
