= Chah-e Savar Agha =

Village in Fars province, Iran

Chah-e Savar Agha Persian: چاه سواراغا
- Village
- Location within Iran
- Coordinates: 29°35′54″N 53°57′18″E
- Country: Iran
- Province: Fars
- County: Bakhtegan
- District: Hana
- Rural District: Chah Gaz

Population (2016)
  - Total: 1,758
- Time zone: UTC+3:30 (IRST)

Chah-e Savar Agha (Persian: چاه سواراغا) is a village in, and the capital of, Chah Gaz Rural District of Hana District, Bakhtegan County, Fars province, Iran.

== Demographics ==
=== Population ===
At the time of the 2006 National Census, the village's population was 1,158 in 260 households, when it was in Hana Rural District of the former Abadeh Tashk District of Neyriz County. The following census in 2011 counted 1,352 people in 341 households. The 2016 census measured the population of the village as 1,758 people in 514 households. It was the most populous village in its rural district.

In 2018, the district was separated from the county in the establishment of Bakhtegan County. Hana Rural District was transferred to the new Hana District, and Chah-e Savar Agha was transferred to Chah Gaz Rural District created in the district.
