= Deh Zir =

Deh Zir or Deh-e Zir (Persian: ده زير) may refer to:

- Deh Zir, Jahrom, Fars Province
- Deh Zir, Neyriz, Fars Province
- Deh-e Zir, Qatruyeh, Neyriz County, Fars Province
- Deh-e Zir, Isfahan
- Deh Zir, Kerman
- Deh Zir, Khuzestan
- Deh-e Zir, Sistan and Baluchestan
