= Kargah =

Kargah (Persian: کرگاه) may refer to:

- Kargah, Larestan, Fars Province
- Kargah, Neyriz, Fars Province
- Kargah, Kermanshah
- Karehgah-ye Pain, Lorestan Province
- Karganeh, Lorestan Province
- Kargah Buddha, a rock-carved statue in Gilgit, Gilgit-Baltistan, Pakistan
