= Kushkak, Bakhtegan =

Village in Fars province, Iran

Kushkak Persian: كوشكك
- Village
- Location within Iran
- Coordinates: 29°42′15″N 53°51′48″E
- Country: Iran
- Province: Fars
- County: Bakhtegan
- District: Central
- Rural District: Bakhtegan

Population (2016)
  - Total: 1,904
- Time zone: UTC+3:30 (IRST)

Kushkak (Persian: كوشكك) (Note: Also romanized as Kūshkak) is a village in, and the capital of, Bakhtegan Rural District of the Central District of Bakhtegan County, Fars province, Iran.

== Demographics ==
=== Population ===
At the time of the 2006 National Census, the village's population was 1,844 in 447 households, when it was in the former Abadeh Tashk District of Neyriz County. The following census in 2011 counted 2,083 people in 571 households. The 2016 census measured the population of the village as 1,904 people in 612 households.

In 2018, the district was separated from the county in the establishment of Bakhtegan County, and Bakhtegan Rural District was transferred to the new Central District.
