= Darju =

Darju درجو
- Village
- Location within Iran
- Coordinates: 29°36′25″N 53°47′10″E
- Country: Iran
- Province: Fars
- County: Neyriz
- Bakhsh: Abadeh Tashk
- Rural District: Bakhtegan

Population (2006)
  - Total: 212
- Time zone: UTC+3:30 (IRST)
  - Summer (DST): UTC+4:30 (IRDT)

Darju (Persian: درجو, also romanized as Darjū; also known as Dar Joveh, Dar Jovū, Darjūreh, and Darjūveh) is a village in Bakhtegan Rural District, Abadeh Tashk District, Neyriz County, Fars province, Iran. At the 2006 census, its population was 212, in 48 families.
