= Hasanabad-e Kushkak =

Hasanabad-e Kushkak حسن ابادكوشكك
- Village
- Location within Iran
- Coordinates: 29°44′17″N 53°54′22″E
- Country: Iran
- Province: Fars
- County: Neyriz
- Bakhsh: Abadeh Tashk
- Rural District: Bakhtegan

Population (2006)
  - Total: 1,151
- Time zone: UTC+3:30 (IRST)
  - Summer (DST): UTC+4:30 (IRDT)

Hasanabad-e Kushkak (Persian: حسن ابادكوشكك, also Romanized as Ḩasanābād-e Kūshkak; also known as Ḩasanābād) is a village in Bakhtegan Rural District, Abadeh Tashk District, Neyriz County, Fars province, Iran. At the 2006 census, its population was 1,151, in 289 families.
