= Shahrak-e Vazireh =

Shahrak-e Vazireh شهرك وزيره
- Village
- Location within Iran
- Coordinates: 28°56′30″N 54°53′37″E
- Country: Iran
- Province: Fars
- County: Neyriz
- Bakhsh: Qatruyeh
- Rural District: Rizab

Population (2006)
  - Total: 685
- Time zone: UTC+3:30 (IRST)
  - Summer (DST): UTC+4:30 (IRDT)

Shahrak-e Vazireh (Persian: شهرك وزيره, also Romanized as Shahrak-e Vazīreh) is a village in Rizab Rural District, Qatruyeh District, Neyriz County, Fars province, Iran. At the 2006 census, its population was 685, in 172 families.
