= Baneh Yekkeh =

Baneh Yekkeh بنه يكه
- Village
- Location within Iran
- Coordinates: 29°31′21″N 54°07′04″E
- Country: Iran
- Province: Fars
- County: Neyriz
- Bakhsh: Abadeh Tashk
- Rural District: Hana

Population (2006)
  - Total: 505
- Time zone: UTC+3:30 (IRST)
  - Summer (DST): UTC+4:30 (IRDT)

Baneh Yekkeh (Persian: بنه يكه; also known as Banī Yak and Banī Yekkeh) is a village in Hana Rural District, Abadeh Tashk District, Neyriz County, Fars province, Iran. At the 2006 census, its population was 505, in 111 families.
