= Tang-e Hana =

Tang-e Hana تنگ حنا
- Village
- Location within Iran
- Coordinates: 29°26′41″N 54°06′52″E
- Country: Iran
- Province: Fars
- County: Neyriz
- Bakhsh: Abadeh Tashk
- Rural District: Hana

Population (2006)
  - Total: 494
- Time zone: UTC+3:30 (IRST)
  - Summer (DST): UTC+4:30 (IRDT)

Tang-e Hana (Persian: تنگ حنا, also Romanized as Shahrak-e Tang-e Ḩanā; also known as Tang-e Ḩanā and Tang Ḩanā) is a village in Hana Rural District, Abadeh Tashk District, Neyriz County, Fars province, Iran. At the 2006 census, its population was 494, in 112 families.
