= Tashk, Fars (village) =

Tashk طشك
- Village
- Location within Iran
- Coordinates: 29°49′41″N 53°35′57″E
- Country: Iran
- Province: Fars
- County: Neyriz
- Bakhsh: Abadeh Tashk
- Rural District: Abadeh Tashk

Population (2006)
  - Total: 577
- Time zone: UTC+3:30 (IRST)
  - Summer (DST): UTC+4:30 (IRDT)

Tashk (Persian: طشك, also Romanized as Ţashk) is a village in Abadeh Tashk Rural District, Abadeh Tashk District, Neyriz County, Fars province, Iran. At the 2006 census, its population was 577, in 170 families.
