= Tal-e Khaki =

Tal-e Khaki تل خاكي
- Village
- Location within Iran
- Coordinates: 29°35′59″N 53°45′41″E
- Country: Iran
- Province: Fars
- County: Neyriz
- Bakhsh: Abadeh Tashk
- Rural District: Bakhtegan

Population (2006)
  - Total: 261
- Time zone: UTC+3:30 (IRST)
  - Summer (DST): UTC+4:30 (IRDT)

Tal-e Khaki (Persian: تل خاكي, also Romanized as Tal-e Khākī) is a village in Bakhtegan Rural District, Abadeh Tashk District, Neyriz County, Fars province, Iran. At the 2006 census, its population was 261, in 64 families.
