= Fakhrabad, Neyriz =

Fakhrabad فخراباد
- Village
- Location within Iran
- Coordinates: 29°30′08″N 54°06′54″E
- Country: Iran
- Province: Fars
- County: Neyriz
- Bakhsh: Abadeh Tashk
- Rural District: Hana

Population (2006)
  - Total: 295
- Time zone: UTC+3:30 (IRST)
  - Summer (DST): UTC+4:30 (IRDT)

Fakhrabad (Persian: فخراباد, also Romanized as Fakhrābād; also known as Fakhrābād Tang-e Ḩanā) is a village in Hana Rural District, Abadeh Tashk District, Neyriz County, Fars province, Iran. At the 2006 census, its population was 295, in 58 families.
