= Hasanabad, Moshkan =

Hasanabad حسن اباد
- Village
- Location within Iran
- Coordinates: 28.9149234°N 54.9523101°E
- Country: Iran
- Province: Fars
- County: Neyriz
- Bakhsh: Moshkan
- Rural District: Deh Chah

Population (2006)
  - Total: 29
- Time zone: UTC+3:30 (IRST)
  - Summer (DST): UTC+4:30 (IRDT)

Hasanabad (Persian: حسن اباد, also Romanized as Ḩasanābād; also known as Ḩasanābād-e Ghūrī) is a village in Deh Chah Rural District, Moshkan District, Neyriz County, Fars province, Iran. At the 2006 census, its population was 29, in 8 families.
