= Beshneh =

Beshneh بشنه
- Village
- Location within Iran
- Coordinates: 29°21′43″N 54°50′04″E
- Country: Iran
- Province: Fars
- County: Neyriz
- Bakhsh: Qatruyeh
- Rural District: Qatruyeh

Population (2006)
  - Total: 221
- Time zone: UTC+3:30 (IRST)
  - Summer (DST): UTC+4:30 (IRDT)

Beshneh (Persian: بشنه, also Romanized as Bashneh; also known as Bishneh) is a village in Qatruyeh Rural District, Qatruyeh District, Neyriz County, Fars province, Iran. At the 2006 census, its population was 221, in 57 families.
