= Sardab, Fars =

Sardab سرداب
- Village
- Location within Iran
- Coordinates: 29°27′32″N 54°26′54″E
- Country: Iran
- Province: Fars
- County: Neyriz
- Bakhsh: Poshtkuh
- Rural District: Deh Chah

Population (2006)
  - Total: 8
- Time zone: UTC+3:30 (IRST)
  - Summer (DST): UTC+4:30 (IRDT)

Sardab (Persian: سرداب, also Romanized as Sardāb) is a village in Deh Chah Rural District, Poshtkuh District, Neyriz County, Fars province, Iran. At the 2006 census, its population was 8, in 5 families.

The climate of Sardab is classified as hot semi-arid according to the Köppen system (BSh), reflecting the broader conditions of southern Fars Province in the Zagros region. Summers are hot (avg. high temp. ranging from 35°C to 40°C), while winters are cold (avg. lows frequently dropping below 0°C). Annual precipitation averages 150-250 mm, predominantly occurring during the winter months from November to April, supporting sparse vegetation adapted to periodic dryness.
