= Bastarm =

Bastarm or Bestrom or Besterom (Persian: بسترم) may refer to:

- Bastarm-e Cheshmeh Anjir
- Bastarm-e Olya
- Bastarm-e Otaqi
