= Chah Mahki =

Chah Mahki چاه محكي
- Village
- Location within Iran
- Coordinates: 29°31′44″N 54°06′56″E
- Country: Iran
- Province: Fars
- County: Neyriz
- Bakhsh: Abadeh Tashk
- Rural District: Hana

Population (2006)
  - Total: 209
- Time zone: UTC+3:30 (IRST)
  - Summer (DST): UTC+4:30 (IRDT)

Chah Mahki (Persian: چاه محكي, also Romanized as Chāh Maḩkī and Chāh Mahkī) is a village in Hana Rural District, Abadeh Tashk District, Neyriz County, Fars province, Iran. At the 2006 census, its population was 209, in 46 families.
