= Safiabad, Fars =

Safiabad صفي اباد
- Village
- Location within Iran
- Coordinates: 29°48′00″N 53°34′45″E
- Country: Iran
- Province: Fars
- County: Neyriz
- Bakhsh: Abadeh Tashk
- Rural District: Abadeh Tashk

Population (2006)
  - Total: 75
- Time zone: UTC+3:30 (IRST)
  - Summer (DST): UTC+4:30 (IRDT)

Safiabad (Persian: صفي اباد, also Romanized as Şafīābād) is a village in Abadeh Tashk Rural District, Abadeh Tashk District, Neyriz County, Fars province, Iran. At the 2006 census, its population was 75, in 17 families.
