= Chah Sorkh =

Chah Sorkh or Chah-e Sorkh (Persian: چاه سرخ) may refer to:

- Chah-e Sorkh, Arsanjan, Fars Province
- Chah Sorkh, Neyriz, Fars Province
- Chah Sorkh, Sarvestan, Fars Province
- Chah Sorkh, Shiraz, Fars Province
- Chah Sorkh, Hormozgan
- Chah Sorkh, Nir, Taft County, Yazd Province
