= Baqarabad =

Baqarabad or Boqrabad (Persian: بقراباد) may refer to:

- Baqarabad, Ardabil
- Boqrabad, East Azerbaijan
- Baqarabad, Kerman
- Baqarabad-e Pir Dusti

== See also ==
- Baqerabad (disambiguation)
