= Chenar Pakaneh =

Chenar Pakaneh چنارپاكنه
- Village
- Country: Iran
- Province: Fars
- County: Neyriz
- Bakhsh: Abadeh Tashk
- Rural District: Hana

Population (2006)
  - Total: 33
- Time zone: UTC+3:30 (IRST)
  - Summer (DST): UTC+4:30 (IRDT)

Chenar Pakaneh (Persian: چنارپاكنه, also Romanized as Chenār Pākaneh) is a village in Hana Rural District, Abadeh Tashk District, Neyriz County, Fars province, Iran. At the 2006 census, its population was 33, in 5 families.
