= Vazireh =

Vazireh وزيره
- Village
- Location within Iran
- Coordinates: 28°58′07″N 54°51′40″E
- Country: Iran
- Province: Fars
- County: Neyriz
- Bakhsh: Qatruyeh
- Rural District: Rizab

Population (2006)
  - Total: 152
- Time zone: UTC+3:30 (IRST)
  - Summer (DST): UTC+4:30 (IRDT)

Vazireh (Persian: وزيره, also Romanized as Vazīreh; also known as Vazīrch) is a village in Rizab Rural District, Qatruyeh District, Neyriz County, Fars province, Iran. At the 2006 census, its population was 152, in 33 families.
