= Shatt-e Badam =

Shatt-e Badam شط بادام
- Village
- Location within Iran
- Coordinates: 29°01′27″N 54°47′14″E
- Country: Iran
- Province: Fars
- County: Neyriz
- Bakhsh: Qatruyeh
- Rural District: Qatruyeh

Population (2006)
  - Total: 123
- Time zone: UTC+3:30 (IRST)
  - Summer (DST): UTC+4:30 (IRDT)

Shatt-e Badam (Persian: شط بادام, also Romanized as Shaţţ-e Bādām) is a village in Qatruyeh Rural District, Qatruyeh District, Neyriz County, Fars province, Iran. At the 2006 census, its population was 123, in 32 families.
