= Tall Sarbani =

Tall Sarbani تل سارباني
- Village
- Location within Iran
- Coordinates: 29°36′06″N 54°01′26″E
- Country: Iran
- Province: Fars
- County: Neyriz
- Bakhsh: Abadeh Tashk
- Rural District: Hana

Population (2006)
  - Total: 236
- Time zone: UTC+3:30 (IRST)
  - Summer (DST): UTC+4:30 (IRDT)

Tall Sarbani (Persian: تل سارباني, also Romanized as Tall Sārbānī) is a village in Hana Rural District, Abadeh Tashk District, Neyriz County, Fars province, Iran. At the 2006 census, its population was 236, in 56 families.
