= Boneh Kolaghi =

Boneh Kolaghi بنه كلاغي
- Village
- Country: Iran
- Province: Fars
- County: Neyriz
- Bakhsh: Qatruyeh
- Rural District: Rizab

Population (2006)
  - Total: 546
- Time zone: UTC+3:30 (IRST)
  - Summer (DST): UTC+4:30 (IRDT)

Boneh Kolaghi (Persian: بنه كلاغي, also Romanized as Shahrak-e Boneh Kolāghī) is a village in Rizab Rural District, Qatruyeh District, Neyriz County, Fars province, Iran. At the 2006 census, its population was 546, in 125 families.
