= Moslemabad =

Moslemabad (Persian: مسلم اباد) may refer to:

- Moslemabad, Fars
- Moslemabad, Hamadan
- Moslemabad, Isfahan
- Moslemabad, Markazi
- Moslemabad, Mazandaran
- Moslemabad, Nishapur, Razavi Khorasan Province
- Moslemabad, Sabzevar, Razavi Khorasan Province
