= Shahrak-e Mahdavi =

Shahrak-e Mahdavi شهرک مهدوی
- village
- Location within Iran
- Coordinates: 29°30′52″N 54°06′40″E
- Country: Iran
- Province: Fars
- County: Neyriz
- Bakhsh: Abadeh Tashk
- Rural District: Hana

Population (2006)
  - Total: 239
- Time zone: UTC+3:30 (IRST)
  - Summer (DST): UTC+4:30 (IRDT)

Shahrak-e Mahdavi (Persian: شهرک مهدوی, romanized: Šahrak-e Mahdavi, also known as Shahrak-e Mahdavī-ye 'Olyā) is a village in Hana Rural District, Abadeh Tashk District, Neyriz County, Fars province, Iran. At the 2006 census, its population was 239, in 58 families.
