= Dizə =

Dizə or Diza may refer to:

- Dizə, Julfa, Azerbaijan
- Dizə, Ordubad, Azerbaijan
- Dizə, Sharur, Azerbaijan
- Diza, Iran (disambiguation)
