= Kangashi =

Kangashi كنگاشي
- Village
- Location within Iran
- Coordinates: 29°36′45″N 53°44′35″E
- Country: Iran
- Province: Fars
- County: Neyriz
- Bakhsh: Abadeh Tashk
- Rural District: Bakhtegan

Population (2006)
  - Total: 160
- Time zone: UTC+3:30 (IRST)
  - Summer (DST): UTC+4:30 (IRDT)

Kangashi (Persian: كنگاشي, also Romanized as Kangāshī) is a village in Bakhtegan Rural District, Abadeh Tashk District, Neyriz County, Fars province, Iran. At the 2006 census, its population was 160, in 44 families.
