= Chah Guraki =

Chah Guraki چاه گوركي
- Village
- Location within Iran
- Coordinates: 29°32′47″N 53°59′52″E
- Country: Iran
- Province: Fars
- County: Neyriz
- Bakhsh: Abadeh Tashk
- Rural District: Hana

Population (2006)
  - Total: 29
- Time zone: UTC+3:30 (IRST)
  - Summer (DST): UTC+4:30 (IRDT)

Chah Guraki (Persian: چاه گوركي, also Romanized as Chāh Gūrakī) is a village in Hana Rural District, Abadeh Tashk District, Neyriz County, Fars province, Iran. At the 2006 census, its population was 29, in 8 families.
