= Jahanabad, Neyriz =

Jahanabad جهان اباد
- Village
- Location within Iran
- Coordinates: 29°43′04″N 53°51′44″E
- Country: Iran
- Province: Fars
- County: Neyriz
- Bakhsh: Abadeh Tashk
- Rural District: Bakhtegan

Population (2006)
  - Total: 1,348
- Time zone: UTC+3:30 (IRST)
  - Summer (DST): UTC+4:30 (IRDT)

Jahanabad (Persian: جهان اباد, also Romanized as Jahānābād; also known as Jahūnābād) is a village in Bakhtegan Rural District, Abadeh Tashk District, Neyriz County, Fars province, Iran. At the 2006 census, its population was 1,348, in 323 families.
