= Sang-e Zur =

Sang-e Zur سنگ زور
- Village
- Location within Iran
- Coordinates: 29°03′32″N 54°44′39″E
- Country: Iran
- Province: Fars
- County: Neyriz
- Bakhsh: Qatruyeh
- Rural District: Qatruyeh

Population (2006)
  - Total: 191
- Time zone: UTC+3:30 (IRST)
  - Summer (DST): UTC+4:30 (IRDT)

Sang-e Zur (Persian: سنگ زور, also Romanized as Sang-e Zūr; also known as Sang-e Zūr-e Qaţārbaneh) is a village in Qatruyeh Rural District, Qatruyeh District, Neyriz County, Fars province, Iran. At the 2006 census, its population was 191, in 50 families.
