= Behuyeh =

Behuyeh بهويه
- Village
- Location within Iran
- Coordinates: 29°27′49″N 54°25′44″E
- Country: Iran
- Province: Fars
- County: Neyriz
- Bakhsh: Poshtkuh
- Rural District: Deh Chah

Population (2006)
  - Total: 359
- Time zone: UTC+3:30 (IRST)
  - Summer (DST): UTC+4:30 (IRDT)

Behuyeh (Persian: بهويه, also Romanized as Behūyeh and Behvieh; also known as Būhū) is a village in Deh Chah Rural District, Poshtkuh District, Neyriz County, Fars province, Iran. At the 2006 census, its population was 359, in 90 families.
