= Shahrak-e Emam Sadeq =

Shahrak-e Emam Sadeq شهرك امام صادق
- Village
- Country: Iran
- Province: Fars
- County: Neyriz
- Bakhsh: Abadeh Tashk
- Rural District: Bakhtegan

Population (2006)
  - Total: 438
- Time zone: UTC+3:30 (IRST)
  - Summer (DST): UTC+4:30 (IRDT)

Shahrak-e Emam Sadeq (Persian: شهرك امام صادق, also Romanized as Shahrak-e Emām Şādeq) is a village in Bakhtegan Rural District, Abadeh Tashk District, Neyriz County, Fars province, Iran. At the 2006 census, its population was 438, in 108 families.
