= Jazin, Fars =

Jazin جزين
- Village
- Location within Iran
- Coordinates: 29°49′12″N 53°39′01″E
- Country: Iran
- Province: Fars
- County: Neyriz
- Bakhsh: Abadeh Tashk
- Rural District: Abadeh Tashk

Population (2006)
  - Total: 639
- Time zone: UTC+3:30 (IRST)
  - Summer (DST): UTC+4:30 (IRDT)

Jazin (Persian: جزين, also Romanized as Jazīn; also known as Gozī) is a village in Abadeh Tashk Rural District, Abadeh Tashk District, Neyriz County, Fars province, Iran. As of the 2006 census, its population was 639, across 175 families.
