= Darbidu =

Darbidu دربيدو
- Village
- Location within Iran
- Coordinates: 29°22′40″N 54°22′50″E
- Country: Iran
- Province: Fars
- County: Neyriz
- Bakhsh: Moshkan
- Rural District: Deh Chah

Population (2006)
  - Total: 165
- Time zone: UTC+3:30 (IRST)
  - Summer (DST): UTC+4:30 (IRDT)

Darbidu (Persian: دربيدو, also Romanized as Darbīdū) is a village in Deh Chah Rural District, Moshkan District, Neyriz County, Fars province, Iran. At the 2006 census, its population was 165, in 38 families.
