= Kimalu =

Kimalu كيمالو
- Village
- Location within Iran
- Coordinates: 29°38′21″N 53°39′49″E
- Country: Iran
- Province: Fars
- County: Neyriz
- Bakhsh: Abadeh Tashk
- Rural District: Bakhtegan

Population (2006)
  - Total: 100
- Time zone: UTC+3:30 (IRST)
  - Summer (DST): UTC+4:30 (IRDT)

Kimalu (Persian: كيمالو, also Romanized as Kīmālū) is a village in Bakhtegan Rural District, Abadeh Tashk District, Neyriz County, Fars province, Iran. At the 2006 census, its population was 100, in 21 families.
