= Bastarm-e Otaqi =

Bastarm-e Otaqi بسترم اتاقي
- Village
- Location within Iran
- Coordinates: 29°28′34″N 54°00′46″E
- Country: Iran
- Province: Fars
- County: Neyriz
- Bakhsh: Abadeh Tashk
- Rural District: Hana

Population (2006)
  - Total: 271
- Time zone: UTC+3:30 (IRST)
  - Summer (DST): UTC+4:30 (IRDT)

Bastarm-e Otaqi (Persian: بسترم اتاقي, also Romanized as Bastarm-e Otāqī and Bestrom-e Otāqī) is a village in Hana Rural District, Abadeh Tashk District, Neyriz County, Fars province, Iran. At the 2006 census, its population was 271, in 56 families.
