= Kahtu =

Kahtu (Persian: كهتو) may refer to:

- Kahtu, Fars
- Kahtu, Kerman
- Kahtuiyeh (disambiguation)
