= Deh Vazir =

Deh Vazir ده وزير
- Village
- Location within Iran
- Coordinates: 29°19′56″N 54°48′02″E
- Country: Iran
- Province: Fars
- County: Neyriz
- Bakhsh: Qatruyeh
- Rural District: Qatruyeh

Population (2006)
  - Total: 12
- Time zone: UTC+3:30 (IRST)
  - Summer (DST): UTC+4:30 (IRDT)

Deh Vazir (Persian: ده وزير, also Romanized as Deh Vazīr; also known as Deh-e Zīr) is a village in Qatruyeh Rural District, Qatruyeh District, Neyriz County, Fars province, Iran. At the 2006 census, its population was 12, in 5 families.
