= Dozdan =

Dozdan (Persian: دزدان) may refer to:

- Dozdan, Fars
- Dozdan, Kerman
