= Ghuri =

Ghuri غوري
- Village
- Location within Iran
- Coordinates: 29°30′36″N 54°28′10″E
- Country: Iran
- Province: Fars
- County: Neyriz
- Bakhsh: Moshkan
- Rural District: Deh Chah

Population (2006)
  - Total: 1,095
- Time zone: UTC+3:30 (IRST)
  - Summer (DST): UTC+4:30 (IRDT)

Ghuri (Persian: غوري, also Romanized as Ghūrī and Ghowrī; also known as Qūrī) is a village in Deh Chah Rural District, Moshkan District, Neyriz County, Fars province, Iran. At the 2006 census, its population was 1,095, in 299 families.
