= Baqerabad, Poshtkuh =

Baqerabad باقراباد
- Village
- Location within Iran
- Coordinates: 29°23′43″N 54°23′01″E
- Country: Iran
- Province: Fars
- County: Neyriz
- Bakhsh: Moshkan
- Rural District: Meshkan

Population (2006)
  - Total: 52
- Time zone: UTC+3:30 (IRST)
  - Summer (DST): UTC+4:30 (IRDT)

Baqerabad (Persian: باقراباد, also Romanized as Bāqerābād) is a village in Meshkan Rural District, Moshkan District, Neyriz County, Fars province, Iran. At the 2006 census, its population was 52, in 13 families.
