= Bastarm-e Olya =

Bastarm-e Olya بسترم عليا
- Village
- Location within Iran
- Coordinates: 29°28′30″N 53°59′45″E
- Country: Iran
- Province: Fars
- County: Neyriz
- Bakhsh: Abadeh Tashk
- Rural District: Hana

Population (2006)
  - Total: 425
- Time zone: UTC+3:30 (IRST)
  - Summer (DST): UTC+4:30 (IRDT)

Bastarm-e Olya (Persian: بسترم عليا, also Romanized as Bastarm-e 'Olyā and Besterom-e Olyā) is a village in Hana Rural District, Abadeh Tashk District, Neyriz County, Fars province, Iran. At the 2006 census, its population was 425, in 102 families.
