= Moslemabad, Fars =

Moslemabad مسلم آباد
- Village
- Location within Iran
- Coordinates: 28°51′36″N 54°59′00″E
- Country: Iran
- Province: Fars
- County: Neyriz
- Bakhsh: Qatruyeh
- Rural District: Rizab

Population (2006)
  - Total: 147
- Time zone: UTC+3:30 (IRST)
  - Summer (DST): UTC+4:30 (IRDT)

Moslemabad (Persian: مسلم آباد, also Romanized as Moslemābād) is a village in Rizab Rural District, Qatruyeh District, Neyriz County, Fars province, Iran. At the 2006 census, its population was 147, in 31 families.
