= Chah Sorkh, Neyriz =

Chah Sorkh چاه سرخ
- Village
- Location within Iran
- Coordinates: 29°38′05″N 54°02′21″E
- Country: Iran
- Province: Fars
- County: Neyriz
- Bakhsh: Abadeh Tashk
- Rural District: Hana

Population (2006)
  - Total: 650
- Time zone: UTC+3:30 (IRST)
  - Summer (DST): UTC+4:30 (IRDT)

Chah Sorkh (Persian: چاه سرخ, also Romanized as Chāh Sorkh) is a village in Hana Rural District, Abadeh Tashk District, Neyriz County, Fars province, Iran. At the 2006 census, its population was 650, in 144 families.
