= Dozdan, Fars =

Dozdan دزدان
- Village
- Location within Iran
- Coordinates: 28°44′29″N 55°08′33″E
- Country: Iran
- Province: Fars
- County: Neyriz
- Bakhsh: Qatruyeh
- Rural District: Rizab

Population (2006)
  - Total: 30
- Time zone: UTC+3:30 (IRST)
  - Summer (DST): UTC+4:30 (IRDT)

Dozdan (Persian: دزدان, also Romanized as Dozdān) is a village in Rizab Rural District, Qatruyeh District, Neyriz County, Fars province, Iran. At the 2006 census, its population was 30, in 7 families.
