= Kargah, Neyriz =

Kargah كارگاه
- Village
- Location within Iran
- Coordinates: 28°52′34″N 54°58′29″E
- Country: Iran
- Province: Fars
- County: Neyriz
- Bakhsh: Qatruyeh
- Rural District: Rizab

Population (2006)
  - Total: 442
- Time zone: UTC+3:30 (IRST)
  - Summer (DST): UTC+4:30 (IRDT)

Kargah (Persian: كارگاه, also Romanized as Kārgāh) is a village in the Rizab Rural District, Qatruyeh District, Neyriz County, Fars province, Iran. At the 2006 census, its population was 442, in 95 families.
