= Qatar Boneh, Fars =

Village in Fars province, Iran

Qatar Boneh Persian: قطاربنه
- Village
- Location within Iran
- Coordinates: 28°59′59″N 54°49′07″E
- Country: Iran
- Province: Fars
- County: Neyriz
- District: Qatruiyeh
- Rural District: Qatruiyeh

Population (2016)
  - Total: 271
- Time zone: UTC+3:30 (IRST)

Qatar Boneh (Persian: قطاربنه,) (Note: Also romanized as Qaţār Boneh) is a village in Qatruiyeh Rural District of Qatruiyeh District, Neyriz County, Fars province, Iran.

== Demographics ==
=== Population ===
At the time of the 2006 National Census, the village's population was 263 in 60 households. The following census in 2011 counted 262 people in 67 households. The 2016 census measured the population of the village as 271 people in 78 households. It was the most populous village in its rural district.
