= Bastarm-e Cheshmeh Anjir =

Bastarm-e Cheshmeh Anjir بسترم چشمه انجير
- Village
- Location within Iran
- Coordinates: 29°27′27″N 53°59′31″E
- Country: Iran
- Province: Fars
- County: Neyriz
- Bakhsh: Abadeh Tashk
- Rural District: Hana

Population (2006)
  - Total: 216
- Time zone: UTC+3:30 (IRST)
  - Summer (DST): UTC+4:30 (IRDT)

Bastarm-e Cheshmeh Anjir (Persian: بسترم چشمه انجير, also Romanized as Bastarm-e Cheshmeh Ānjīr and Besterom-e Cheshmehānjīr) is a village in Hana Rural District, Abadeh Tashk District, Neyriz County, Fars province, Iran. At the 2006 census, its population was 216, in 50 families.
