= Deh Zir, Neyriz =

Deh Zir ده زير
- Village
- Location within Iran
- Coordinates: 29°46′14″N 53°45′05″E
- Country: Iran
- Province: Fars
- County: Neyriz
- Bakhsh: Abadeh Tashk
- Rural District: Abadeh Tashk

Population (2006)
  - Total: 567
- Time zone: UTC+3:30 (IRST)
  - Summer (DST): UTC+4:30 (IRDT)

Deh Zir (Persian: ده زير, also romanized as Deh Zīr and Deh-e Zīr; also known as Dehrīz) is a village in Abadeh Tashk Rural District, Abadeh Tashk District, Neyriz County, Fars province, Iran. At the 2006 census, its population was 567, in 144 families.
