= Deh Chah =

Village in Fars province, Iran

Deh Chah Persian: ده چاه
- Village
- Location within Iran
- Coordinates: 29°22′02″N 54°27′53″E
- Country: Iran
- Province: Fars
- County: Neyriz
- District: Meshkan
- Rural District: Deh Chah

Population (2016)
  - Total: 1,715
- Time zone: UTC+3:30 (IRST)

Deh Chah (Persian: ده چاه) (Note: Also romanized as Deh Chāh and Deh-e Chāh) is a village in, and the capital of, Deh Chah Rural District (Note: Formerly Meshkan Rural District) of Meshkan District, (Note: Formerly Poshtkuh District) Neyriz County, Fars province, Iran.

== Demographics ==
=== Population ===
At the time of the 2006 National Census, the village's population was 2,123 in 554 households. The following census in 2011 counted 1,906 people in 560 households. The 2016 census measured the population of the village as 1,715 people in 537 households. It was the most populous village in its rural district.
