= Khvajeh Jamali, Bakhtegan =

City in Fars province, Iran

Khvajeh Jamali خواجه جمالي
- City
- Location within Iran
- Coordinates: 29°48′52″N 53°50′39″E
- Country: Iran
- Province: Fars
- County: Bakhtegan
- District: Central

Population (2016)
  - Total: 3,394
- Time zone: UTC+3:30 (IRST)

Khvajeh Jamali (Persian: خواجه جمالي) (Note: Also romanized as Khvājeh Jamālī; also known as Khājeh Jamālī and Khwāja Jamalī) is a city in the Central District of Bakhtegan County, Fars province, Iran.

== Demographics ==
The city's population is made up of Lurs who speak the Luri language.

=== Population ===
At the time of the 2006 National Census, Khvajeh Jamali's population was 2,857 in 717 households, when it was a village in Abadeh Tashk Rural District of the former Abadeh Tashk District of Neyriz County. The following census in 2011 counted 3,162 people in 886 households. The 2016 census measured the population of the village as 3,394 people in 1,167 households. It was the most populous village in its rural district.

In 2018, the district was separated from the county in the establishment of Bakhtegan County, and the rural district was transferred to the new Central District. In 2023, Khvajeh Jamali was elevated to the status of a city.

== Economy ==
Some chromite mines are in Khvajeh Jamali, and the city produces walnuts, pomegranates, and grapes.
