= Darvishabad, Fars =

Darvishabad درويش اباد
- Village
- Location within Iran
- Coordinates: 28°54′02″N 54°57′27″E
- Country: Iran
- Province: Fars
- County: Neyriz
- Bakhsh: Qatruyeh
- Rural District: Rizab

Population (2006)
  - Total: 80
- Time zone: UTC+3:30 (IRST)
  - Summer (DST): UTC+4:30 (IRDT)

Darvishabad (Persian: درويش اباد, also Romanized as Darvīshābād) is a village in Rizab Rural District, Qatruyeh District, Neyriz County, Fars province, Iran. At the 2006 census, its population was 80, in 17 families.
