= Tom Shuli =

City in Fars province, Iran

Tom Shuli Persian: تم شولي
- City
- Location within Iran
- Coordinates: 29°35′38″N 54°02′48″E
- Country: Iran
- Province: Fars
- County: Bakhtegan
- District: Hana

Population (2016)
  - Total: 1,362
- Time zone: UTC+3:30 (IRST)

Tom Shuli (Persian: تم شولي) (Note: Also romanized as Tom Shūlī) is a city in, and the capital of, Hana District of Bakhtegan County, Fars province, Iran. As a village, it was the capital of Hana Rural District until its capital was transferred to the village of Qasemabad.

== Demographics ==
=== Population ===
At the time of the 2006 National Census, Tom Shuli's population was 1,289 in 276 households, when it was a village in Hana Rural District of the former Abadeh Tashk District of Neyriz County. The following census in 2011 counted 1,423 people in 379 households. The 2016 census measured the population of the village as 1,362 people in 398 households.

In 2018, the district was separated from the county in the establishment of Bakhtegan County, and Hana Rural District was transferred to the new Hana District. In 2023, Tom Shuli was elevated to the status of a city.
