= Shahrak-e Emam, Neyriz =

Village in Fars province, Iran

Shahrak-e Emam Persian: شهرك امام
- Village
- Location within Iran
- Coordinates: 28°51′05″N 55°00′44″E
- Country: Iran
- Province: Fars
- County: Neyriz
- District: Qatruiyeh
- Rural District: Rizab

Population (2016)
  - Total: 3,840
- Time zone: UTC+3:30 (IRST)

Shahrak-e Emam (Persian: شهرك امام,) (Note: Also romanized as Shahrak-e Emām; formerly Rizab (ريزآب)) is a village in, and the capital of, Rizab Rural District of Qatruiyeh District, Neyriz County, Fars province, Iran.

== Demographics ==
=== Population ===
At the time of the 2006 National Census, the village's population was 2,746 in 578 households. The following census in 2011 counted 3,579 people in 914 households. The 2016 census measured the population of the village as 3,840 people in 1,079 households. It was the most populous village in its rural district.
