= Bagham =

Bagham may refer to:

- Bagham, Iran
- Bagham, Kent, United Kingdom

== See also ==
- Baghamari, a village in Odisha, India
