= Chah Gaz, Fars =

Chah Gaz چاه گز
- Village
- Location within Iran
- Coordinates: 29°37′02″N 53°55′32″E
- Country: Iran
- Province: Fars
- County: Neyriz
- Bakhsh: Abadeh Tashk
- Rural District: Hana

Population (2006)
  - Total: 1,009
- Time zone: UTC+3:30 (IRST)
  - Summer (DST): UTC+4:30 (IRDT)

Chah Gaz (Persian: چاه گز, also Romanized as Chāh Gaz; also known as Chāh Kaz) is a village in Hana Rural District, Abadeh Tashk District, Neyriz County, Fars province, Iran. At the 2006 census, its population was 1,009, in 253 families.
