= Kahtuiyeh =

Kahtuiyeh or Kahtuyeh (Persian: كهتويه or كهتوييه)

- Kahtuyeh, Fars (كهتويه - Kahtūyeh)
- Kahtuiyeh, Hormozgan (كهتويه - Kahtūīyeh)
- Kahtuiyeh, Kerman (كهتوييه - Kahtū’īyeh)
