= Kahtu, Fars =

Kahtu كهتو
- Village
- Location within Iran
- Coordinates: 29°31′41″N 54°22′16″E
- Country: Iran
- Province: Fars
- County: Neyriz
- Bakhsh: Moshkan
- Rural District: Meshkan

Population (2006)
  - Total: 35
- Time zone: UTC+3:30 (IRST)
  - Summer (DST): UTC+4:30 (IRDT)

Kahtu (Persian: كهتو, also Romanized as Kahtū; also known as Kahtūyeh) is a village in Meshkan Rural District, Moshkan District, Neyriz County, Fars province, Iran. At the 2006 census, its population was 35, in 20 families.
