= Hana District =

District in Fars province, Iran

Hana District Persian: بخش حنا
- District
- Location within Iran
- Coordinates: 29°32′48″N 53°57′34″E
- Country: Iran
- Province: Fars
- County: Bakhtegan
- Capital: Tom Shuli
- Time zone: UTC+3:30 (IRST)

Hana District (Persian: بخش حنا) is in Bakhtegan County, Fars province, Iran. Its capital is the city of Tom Shuli, whose population at the time of the 2016 National Census was 1,362 people in 398 households.

== History ==
In 2018, Abadeh Tashk District was separated from Neyriz County in the establishment of Bakhtegan County, which was divided into two districts of two rural districts each, with Abadeh Tashk as its capital and only city at the time. In 2023, the village of Tom Shuli was elevated to the status of a city.

== Demographics ==
=== Administrative divisions ===
Hana District
Administrative Divisions
Chah Gaz RD
Hana RD
Tom Shuli (city) (Note: Became a city after the 2016 census)
RD = Rural District
