= Chah Gaz Rural District =

Rural district in Fars province, Iran

Chah Gaz Rural District Persian: دهستان چاه گز
- Rural District
- Location within Iran
- Coordinates: 29°34′23″N 53°56′49″E
- Country: Iran
- Province: Fars
- County: Bakhtegan
- District: Hana
- Capital: Chah-e Savar Agha
- Time zone: UTC+3:30 (IRST)

Chah Gaz Rural District (Persian: دهستان چاه گز) is in Hana District of Bakhtegan County, Fars province, Iran. Its capital is the village of Chah-e Savar Agha, whose population at the time of the 2016 National Census was 1,758 in 514 households.

== History ==
In 2018, Abadeh Tashk District was separated from Neyriz County in the establishment of Bakhtegan County, and Chah Gaz Rural District was created in the new Hana District.
