= S.P.R (Castle) =

Castle in Fars province, Iran

- اس‌پی‌آر

General information
- Type: Castle
- Location: Neyriz County, Iran

S.P.R (Persian: اس‌پی‌آر) is a historical castle located in Neyriz County in Fars province, The longevity of this fortress dates back to the Historical periods after Islam.
