= Quri (disambiguation) =

Quri may refer to:

- Quri, a village in the Khesht Rural District, Khesht District, Kazerun County, Fars Province, Iran
- Quri (Lima-Junín), a mountain on the border of the Lima Region and the Junín Region, Peru
- Quri (Paucartambo), a mountain on the border of the Paucartambo Province and the Quispicanchi Province, Cusco Region, Peru
- Quri (Quiquijana), a mountain in the Quispicanchi Province, Cusco Region, Peru
- Quri, Neyriz, a village in the Deh Chah Rural District, Poshtkuh District, Neyriz County, Fars Province, Iran
