= La Sib =

Village in Isfahan province, Iran

La Sib Persian: لاسيب
- Village
- Location within Iran
- Coordinates: 33°11′31″N 52°15′48″E
- Country: Iran
- Province: Isfahan
- County: Ardestan
- District: Central
- Rural District: Olya

Population (2016)
  - Total: 65
- Time zone: UTC+3:30 (IRST)

La Sib (Persian: لاسيب) (Note: Also romanized as Lā Sīb; also known as Lāseb) is a village in Olya Rural District of the Central District in Ardestan County, Isfahan province, Iran.

== Demographics ==
=== Population ===
At the time of the 2006 National Census, the village's population was 148 in 48 households. The following census in 2011 counted 90 people in 39 households. The 2016 census measured the population of the village as 65 people in 29 households.
