= Mast Bandi =

Village in Isfahan province, Iran

Mast Bandi Persian: ماست بندی
- Village
- Location within Iran
- Coordinates: 33°13′21″N 52°19′56″E
- Country: Iran
- Province: Isfahan
- County: Ardestan
- District: Central
- Rural District: Olya

Population (2016)
  - Total: 140
- Time zone: UTC+3:30 (IRST)

Mast Bandi (Persian: ماست بندی) (Note: Also romanized as Māst Bandī) is a village in Olya Rural District of the Central District in Ardestan County, Isfahan province, Iran.

== Demographics ==
=== Population ===
At the time of the 2006 National Census, the village's population was 90 in 30 households. The following census in 2011 counted 82 people in 29 households. The 2016 census measured the population of the village as 140 people in 49 households.
