= Meshkan =

City in Fars province, Iran

Meshkan Persian: مشكان
- City
- Location within Iran
- Coordinates: 29°28′33″N 54°19′58″E
- Country: Iran
- Province: Fars
- County: Neyriz
- District: Meshkan

Population (2016)
  - Total: 4,617
- Time zone: UTC+3:30 (IRST)

Meshkan (Persian: مشكان) (Note: Also romanized as Meshkān and Moshkān; also known as Mishkūn and Moshgān) is a city in, and the capital of, Meshkan District (Note: Formerly Poshtkuh District) of Neyriz County, Fars province, Iran. It also serves as the administrative center for Meshkan Rural District. The city is the merger of the villages of Meshkan and Shahrak-e Shahid in 2002.

== Demographics ==
=== Population ===
At the time of the 2006 National Census, the city's population was 4,630 in 1,196 households. The following census in 2011 counted 4,580 people in 1,345 households. The 2016 census measured the population of the city as 4,617 people in 1,458 households.
