= Diza, Iran =

Diza (Persian: ديزا) in Iran may refer to:

- Diza, East Azerbaijan
- Diza, Isfahan
