= Central District (Bakhtegan County) =

District in Fars province, Iran

Central District (Bakhtegan County) Persian: بخش مرکزی شهرستان بختگان
- District
- Location within Iran
- Coordinates: 29°41′39″N 53°45′25″E
- Country: Iran
- Province: Fars
- County: Bakhtegan
- Capital: Abadeh Tashk
- Time zone: UTC+3:30 (IRST)

The Central District of Bakhtegan County (Persian: بخش مرکزی شهرستان بختگان) is in Fars province, Iran. Its capital is the city of Abadeh Tashk, whose population at the time of the 2016 National Census was 7,379 people in 2,277 households.

== History ==
In 2018, Abadeh Tashk District was separated from Neyriz County in the establishment of Bakhtegan County, which was divided into two districts of two rural districts each, with Abadeh Tashk as its capital and only city at the time. In 2023, the village of Khvajeh Jamali was elevated to the status of a city.

== Demographics ==
=== Administrative divisions ===
Central District (Bakhtegan County)
Administrative Divisions
Abadeh Tashk RD
Bakhtegan RD
Abadeh Tashk (city)
Khvajeh Jamali (city) (Note: Became a city after the 2016 census)
RD = Rural District
