= Olya Rural District =

Rural district in Isfahan province, Iran

Olya Rural District Persian: دهستان عليا
- Rural District
- Location within Iran
- Coordinates: 33°07′N 52°06′E
- Country: Iran
- Province: Isfahan
- County: Ardestan
- District: Central
- Established: 1987
- Capital: Bagham

Population (2016)
  - Total: 1,453
- Time zone: UTC+3:30 (IRST)

Olya Rural District (Persian: دهستان عليا) is in the Central District of Ardestan County, Isfahan province, Iran. Its capital is the village of Bagham.

== Demographics ==
=== Population ===
At the time of the 2006 National Census, the rural district's population was 1,836 in 622 households. There were 1,480 inhabitants in 543 households at the following census of 2011. The 2016 census measured the population of the rural district as 1,453 in 545 households. The most populous of its 24 villages was Janbeh, with 350 people.

=== Other villages in the rural district ===
- Avanj
- Baqerabad
- Dizalu
- La Sib
- Mast Bandi
- Tutgan
