= Tutgan =

Village in Isfahan province, Iran

Tutgan Persian: توتگان
- Village
- Location within Iran
- Country: Iran
- Province: Isfahan
- County: Ardestan
- District: Central
- Rural District: Olya

Population (2016)
  - Total: 98
- Time zone: UTC+3:30 (IRST)

Tutgan (Persian: توتگان) (Note: Also romanized as Tūtgān; also known as Tūt Tagān and Tūtekān) is a village in Olya Rural District of the Central District in Ardestan County, Isfahan province, Iran.

== Demographics ==
=== Population ===
At the time of the 2006 National Census, the village's population was 108 in 49 households. The following census in 2011 counted 58 people in 30 households. The 2016 census measured the population of the village as 98 people in 43 households.
