= Baqerabad, Bafq =

Bagherabad باقرآباد
- Village
- Location within Iran
- Coordinates: 31°39′54″N 55°22′39″E
- Country: Iran
- Province: Yazd
- County: Bafq
- Bakhsh: Central
- Rural District: Mobarakeh

Population (2006)
  - Total: 34
- Time zone: UTC+3:30 (IRST)
  - Summer (DST): UTC+4:30 (IRDT)

Baqerabad (Persian: باقرآباد, also Romanized as Bāqerābād; also known as Bagherabad, Bagherabad Bafgh, Baqer Abad Bafq or باقراباد or باقرآباد بافق) is a village in Mobarakeh Rural District, in the Central District of Bafq County, Yazd Province, Iran. At the 2006 census, its population was 34, in 10 families. The Baqerabad Castle is located in this village.
