= Janbeh =

Village in Isfahan province, Iran

Janbeh Persian: جنبه
- Village
- Location within Iran
- Coordinates: 33°06′07″N 52°14′07″E
- Country: Iran
- Province: Isfahan
- County: Ardestan
- District: Central
- Rural District: Olya

Population (2016)
  - Total: 350
- Time zone: UTC+3:30 (IRST)

Janbeh (Persian: جنبه) (Note: Also romanized as Jonbeh) is a village in Olya Rural District of the Central District in Ardestan County, Isfahan province, Iran.

== Demographics ==
=== Population ===
At the time of the 2006 National Census, the village's population was 306 in 86 households. The following census in 2011 counted 287 people in 89 households. The 2016 census measured the population of the village as 350 people in 101 households, the most populous in its rural district.
