= Qatruiyeh, Fars =

City in Fars province, Iran

Qatruiyeh Persian: قطرويه
- City
- Location within Iran
- Coordinates: 29°08′46″N 54°42′09″E
- Country: Iran
- Province: Fars
- County: Neyriz
- District: Qatruiyeh

Population (2016)
  - Total: 2,895
- Time zone: UTC+3:30 (IRST)

Qatruiyeh (Persian: قطرويه) (Note: Also romanized as Qaţrū’īyeh, and Qaţrūyeh; also known as Ghotrooyeh, Katru, and Qatru) is a city in, and the capital of, Qatruiyeh District of Neyriz County, Fars province, Iran. It also serves as the administrative center for Qatruiyeh Rural District.

== Demographics ==
=== Population ===
At the time of the 2006 National Census, Qatruiyeh's population was 2,746 in 768 households, when it was a village in Qatruiyeh Rural District. The following census in 2011 counted 2,764 people in 825 households, by which time the village had been elevated to the status of a city. The 2016 census measured the population of the city as 2,895 people in 897 households.
