= Avanj =

Village in Isfahan province, Iran

Avanj Persian: اونج
- Village
- Location within Iran
- Coordinates: 33°10′45″N 52°22′07″E
- Country: Iran
- Province: Isfahan
- County: Ardestan
- District: Central
- Rural District: Olya

Population (2016)
  - Total: 59
- Time zone: UTC+3:30 (IRST)

Avanj (Persian: اونج) (Note: Also romanized as Āvanj and Evanj) is a village in Olya Rural District of the Central District in Ardestan County, Isfahan province, Iran.

== Demographics ==
=== Population ===
At the time of the 2006 National Census, the village's population was 112 in 50 households. The following census in 2011 counted 80 people in 43 households. The 2016 census measured the population of the village as 59 people in 35 households.
