= Baqerabad-e Tabatabayi =

Baqerabad-e Tabatabayi باقرابادطباطبائي
- Village
- Location within Iran
- Coordinates: 28°35′46″N 57°50′42″E
- Country: Iran
- Province: Kerman
- County: Jiroft
- Bakhsh: Central
- Rural District: Dowlatabad

Population (2006)
  - Total: 459
- Time zone: UTC+3:30 (IRST)
  - Summer (DST): UTC+4:30 (IRDT)

Baqerabad-e Tabatabayi (Persian: باقرابادطباطبائي, also Romanized as Bāqerābād-e Ţabāṭabāyī; also known as Bāqerābād) is a village in Dowlatabad Rural District, in the Central District of Jiroft County, Kerman Province, Iran. At the 2006 census, its population was 459, in 93 families.
