= Baqerabad-e Olya =

Baqerabad-e Olya باقرابادعليا
- Village
- Location within Iran
- Coordinates: 34°05′25″N 46°47′33″E
- Country: Iran
- Province: Kermanshah
- County: Eslamabad-e Gharb
- Bakhsh: Central
- Rural District: Hasanabad

Population (2006)
  - Total: 594
- Time zone: UTC+3:30 (IRST)
  - Summer (DST): UTC+4:30 (IRDT)

Baqerabad-e Olya (Persian: باقرابادعليا, also Romanized as Bāqerābād-e ‘Olyā) is a village in Hasanabad Rural District, in the Central District of Eslamabad-e Gharb County, Kermanshah Province, Iran. At the 2006 census, its population was 594, in 124 families.
