= Dozdan, Kerman =

Dozdan دزدان
- Village
- Location within Iran
- Coordinates: 29°17′37″N 56°58′53″E
- Country: Iran
- Province: Kerman
- County: Rabor
- Bakhsh: Hanza
- Rural District: Javaran

Population (2006)
  - Total: 181
- Time zone: UTC+3:30 (IRST)
  - Summer (DST): UTC+4:30 (IRDT)

Dozdan (Persian: دزدان, also Romanized as Dozdān; also known as Dozhdān) is a village in Javaran Rural District, Hanza District, Rabor County, Kerman Province, Iran. At the 2006 census, its population was 181, in 46 families.
