= Baqerabad Meyanrud =

Baqerabad Meyanrud باقرابادميان رود
- Village
- Location within Iran
- Coordinates: 34°42′00″N 47°07′00″E
- Country: Iran
- Province: Kermanshah
- County: Kermanshah
- Bakhsh: Central
- Rural District: Poshtdarband

Population (2006)
  - Total: 56
- Time zone: UTC+3:30 (IRST)
  - Summer (DST): UTC+4:30 (IRDT)

Baqerabad Meyanrud (Persian: باقرابادميان رود, also Romanized as Bāqerābād Meyānrūd) is a village in Poshtdarband Rural District, in the Central District of Kermanshah County, Kermanshah Province, Iran. At the 2006 census, its population was 56, in 13 families.
