= Baqerabad, Ardestan =

Village in Isfahan province, Iran

Baqerabad Persian: باقراباد
- Village
- Location within Iran
- Coordinates: 33°02′14″N 51°58′29″E
- Country: Iran
- Province: Isfahan
- County: Ardestan
- District: Central
- Rural District: Olya

Population (2016)
  - Total: 196
- Time zone: UTC+3:30 (IRST)

Baqerabad (Persian: باقراباد) (Note: Also romanized as Bāqerābād; also known as Bāqirābād) is a village in Olya Rural District of the Central District in Ardestan County, Isfahan province, Iran.

== Demographics ==
=== Population ===
At the time of the 2006 National Census, the village's population was 220 in 61 households. The following census in 2011 counted 199 people in 62 households. The 2016 census measured the population of the village as 196 people in 62 households.
