= Tol-e Gavmishi =

Tol-e Gavmishi تل گاوميشي
- Village
- Location within Iran
- Coordinates: 30°08′48″N 52°02′10″E
- Country: Iran
- Province: Fars
- County: Sepidan
- Bakhsh: Hamaijan
- Rural District: Hamaijan

Population (2006)
  - Total: 94
- Time zone: UTC+3:30 (IRST)
  - Summer (DST): UTC+4:30 (IRDT)

Tol-e Gavmishi (Persian: تل گاوميشي, also Romanized as Tol-e Gāvmīshī; also known as Bāqerābād, Gāvmīsh, and Tal-e Gāvmīsh) is a village in Hamaijan Rural District, Hamaijan District, Sepidan County, Fars province, Iran. At the 2006 census, its population was 94, in 20 families.
