= Dizə, Julfa =

Dizə
- Municipality
- Location within Azerbaijan
- Coordinates: 39°00′37″N 45°44′23″E
- Country: Azerbaijan
- Autonomous republic: Nakhchivan
- District: Julfa

Population (2005)
  - Total: 1,008
- Time zone: UTC+4 (AZT)

Dizə (also, Kyarimkuli-Diza and Kerimkuludiza) is a village and municipality in the Julfa District of Nakhchivan, Azerbaijan. It is located 16 km in the north from the district center, on the left bank of the Khoshkeri River. Its population is busy with vine-growing, farming and animal husbandry. There are secondary school, club, library, communication branch, kindergarten, medical center and "Imamzade sanctuary" in the village. It has a population of 1,008.

== Etymology ==
Its previous name was Kyarimkuli Diza. In the ancient Iranian languages the word of dizə means "wall, fence," "fortified town", "fortress wall", "fortress", "fortified". It passed in to several Turkic languages, including Azerbaijani language and is used in meaning as "village".
