= Darvishabad, South Khorasan =

Darvishabad درويش اباد
- Village
- Location within Iran
- Coordinates: 32°46′15″N 59°43′10″E
- Country: Iran
- Province: South Khorasan
- County: Sarbisheh
- Bakhsh: Mud
- Rural District: Mud

Population (2006)
  - Total: 145
- Time zone: UTC+3:30 (IRST)
  - Summer (DST): UTC+4:30 (IRDT)

Darvishabad (Persian: درويش اباد, also Romanized as Darvīshābād and Dervīshābād) is a village in Mud Rural District, Mud District, Sarbisheh County, South Khorasan Province, Iran. According to the 2006 census, it had a population of 145 in 30 families.
