= Deh Zir, Kerman =

Deh Zir ده زير
- Village
- Location within Iran
- Coordinates: 30°28′52″N 56°39′36″E
- Country: Iran
- Province: Kerman
- County: Kerman
- Bakhsh: Chatrud
- Rural District: Kavirat

Population (2006)
  - Total: 15
- Time zone: UTC+3:30 (IRST)
  - Summer (DST): UTC+4:30 (IRDT)

Deh Zir (Persian: ده زير, also Romanized as Deh Zīr; also known as Deh Rīz, Deh Zeyd, and Duzīri) is a village in Kavirat Rural District, Chatrud District, Kerman County, Kerman Province, Iran. At the 2006 census, its population was 15, in 5 families.
