= Baqerabad, Zavareh =

Baqerabad باقراباد
- Village
- Location within Iran
- Coordinates: 33°33′41″N 52°25′00″E
- Country: Iran
- Province: Isfahan
- County: Ardestan
- Bakhsh: Zavareh
- Rural District: Rigestan

Population (2006)
  - Total: 18
- Time zone: UTC+3:30 (IRST)
  - Summer (DST): UTC+4:30 (IRDT)

Baqerabad (Persian: باقراباد, also Romanized as Bāqerābād; also known as Bāgerābād and Bāqerābād-e Zavāreh) is a village in Rigestan Rural District, Zavareh District, Ardestan County, Isfahan Province, Iran. At the 2006 census, its population was 18, in 4 families.
