= Sameleh =

Sameleh سامله
- Village
- Location within Iran
- Coordinates: 34°53′30″N 47°10′58″E
- Country: Iran
- Province: Kermanshah
- County: Sonqor
- Bakhsh: Kolyai
- Rural District: Kivanat

Population (2006)
  - Total: 285
- Time zone: UTC+3:30 (IRST)
  - Summer (DST): UTC+4:30 (IRDT)

Sameleh (Persian: سامله, also Romanized as Sāmeleh and Sāmelah; also known as Bāqerābād and Bāqīrābād) is a village in Kivanat Rural District, Kolyai District, Sonqor County, Kermanshah Province, Iran. At the 2006 census, its population was 285, in 75 families.
