= Baqerabad, Shazand =

Baqerabad باقراباد
- Village
- Location within Iran
- Coordinates: 33°53′39″N 49°07′59″E
- Country: Iran
- Province: Markazi
- County: Shazand
- Bakhsh: Zalian
- Rural District: Zalian

Population (2006)
  - Total: 32
- Time zone: UTC+3:30 (IRST)
  - Summer (DST): UTC+4:30 (IRDT)

Baqerabad (Persian: باقراباد, also Romanized as Bāqerābād; also known as Bāqirābād) is a village in Zalian Rural District, Zalian District, Shazand County, Markazi Province, Iran. At the 2006 census, its population was 32, in 12 families.
