= Chah Sorkh, Nir =

Chah Sorkh چاه سرخ
- Village
- Location within Iran
- Coordinates: 31°29′00″N 54°04′02″E
- Country: Iran
- Province: Yazd
- County: Taft
- Bakhsh: Nir
- Rural District: Sakhvid

Population (2006)
  - Total: 24
- Time zone: UTC+3:30 (IRST)
  - Summer (DST): UTC+4:30 (IRDT)

Chah Sorkh (Persian: چاه سرخ, also Romanized as Chāh Sorkh) is a village in Sakhvid Rural District, Nir District, Taft County, Yazd Province, Iran. At the 2006 census, its population was 24, in 11 families.
