= Baghamari =

- Village
- Location in Odisha, India
- Coordinates: 20°13′14″N 85°30′05″E
- Country: India
- State: Odisha
- District: Khurda

Area
  - Total: 5 km^{2} (1.9 sq mi)

Population
  - Total: 30,000
  - Density: 6,000/km^{2} (16,000/sq mi)

Languages
  - Official: Odia ENGLISH
- Time zone: UTC+5:30 (IST)

Baghamari is a village located in the Western part of Khordha district in the Indian state of Odisha. The population is more than 20,000. The meaning of the name of this village is 'Killing the Tigers'. In times prior to Independence of India (1947), the area was deeply forested and populated with wild animals.

== History ==
The first mention of this village in chronicled history appears in the Madala Panji entries recorded during the reign of Gajapati Shri Mukunda Deva Maharaj, the last of the Gajapatis of State of Orissa and Khurda King Raja Ramachandra Dev-I. This Gajapati Mukunda Deva's summer residence was transferred to the village Baghamari during the heights of Paika Rebellion (Mutiny of the Peasant Warriors) of 1817 A.D. Baghamari remained the main centre of strategic resistance for a short time during that period. Baghamari was one out of the 74 'Gadas' (military strongholds) in the Khurda area at the command of the then Gajapati King of Khurda during the Paika Rebellion. Thereafter, the village appears in military history of Orissa as chronicled by the war records-keeper Shri Brajanath BadaJena.

== Geography ==
Baghmari is located at co-ordinates 20°13′14″N 85°30′05″E. The Kenduli River, which is a tributary of the Mahanadi, flows through the Western-Northern flank of the village and almost outline the extent of the village in these directions. The main locality the village is surrounded on all sides by green paddy fields. On the south-eastern boundary of the village, there is the famous hot-spring of Atri. The Atri hot-spring is a typical sulphur spring. There are now more than 25 baths and 2 pools in a lush green setting. This hot-spring acts as a big tourist attraction of the region.

== Demography ==
The population of the village is more than 20,000. The sex ratio of the village is close to 972 females per 1000 males. The village can be said to be located on the southern side of the State Highway No. 1. There are 7 major localities in the village, called the 'Sahis'. Originally, the 'Sahis' had been formed on the basis of occupational homogeneity and concept of 'Clan'. However, presently, there has been enormous inter-mixing and mingling among the 'sahis' leading to a mixed occupational structure in the 'sahis'.

== Settlement Pattern/Structural Lay-out of the Village ==
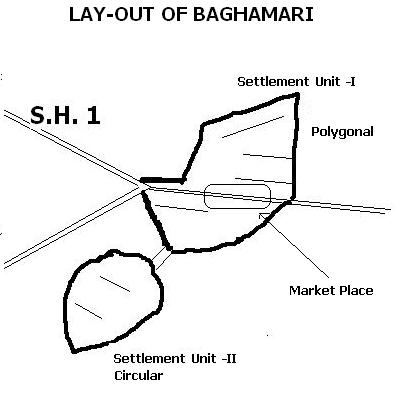
Layout of Baghamari

The village has two distinct areas of concentrated settlement, thus making the form that of a fragmented 'double village'. The larger settlement is of polygonal pattern on account of the influence of State Highway No. 1 on settlement structure. However, the settlement in the secondary settlement region is circular. The internal lanes are clustered with rectangular houses on both sides.

== Economy ==
Backbone of economy of this village is agriculture. Stone quarrying also contributes to income of the inhabitants. The village of Baghamari is located on a fork (One arm leading to Nayagarh city and the other to Banki city) of State Highway No. 1. Because of its vantage location, the village acts as a central place to nearby regions. In agriculture, on account of the absence of irrigation facilities, the only 2 crops could be grown on the fields.

== Migration ==
Forces of urbanization and globalization have led to emergence of 'pull' factors like better employment opportunities, higher income earning potential etc.. These have resulted in out-migration of large numbers of inhabitants of the village Baghamri to nearby townships of Khurda and city of Bhubaneswar, creating geographies of economic displacement. The complex process of migration have resulted in drastic alterations in the web of social relations and cultural affinities in Baghamri's rural fabric, and have erased the simplistic notions of homogeneous rural cultures as regarded in normal Odia cultural paradigms.

== Educational Scenario ==
The educational scenario in the village is not satisfactory. Alpha-numeric literacy in the village is mere 63%, which is higher than the State average. There is only one school named the Raghunath Dev School for basic, primary, secondary and high school education.

== Places of tourist interest ==
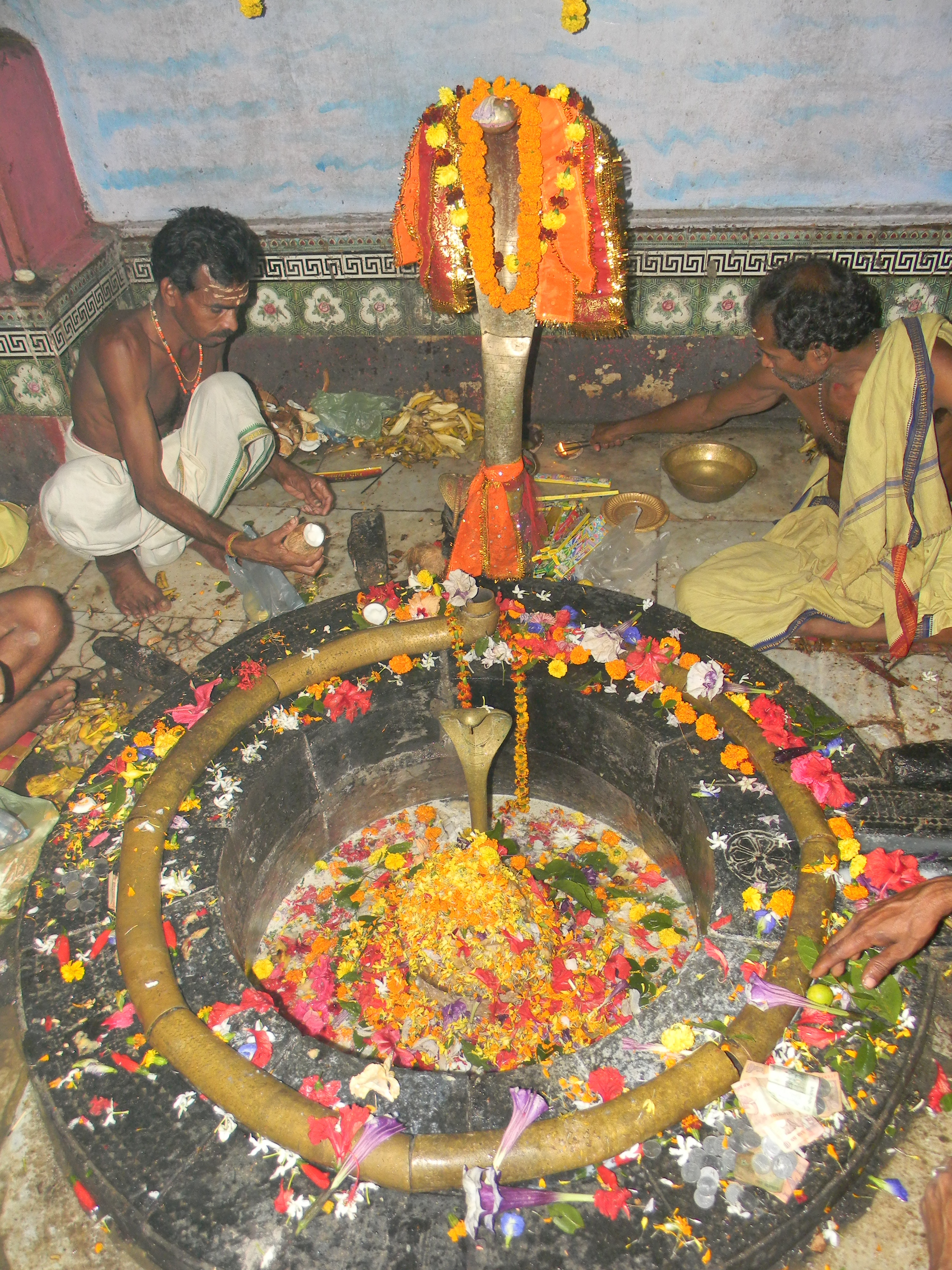
Hattakeshwara

=== Atri hot spring ===
Atri hot spring is situated in the village of Baghamari. Atri has a sulfur hot-Spring (Locally called the 'Kua Kunda' - Crow's Tank). Atri also has a famous temple dedicated to Lord Hatakeswara (a variant of Lord Shiva). The Famous Makar Mela is celebrated here at the time of makar sakranti (as of Hindu calendar) for 30 days. Nearly 100,000 people gather here to see the mela in the first day of mela. In 2016, first time mela is arranged by Odisha tourism department for three days with a cultural programme.

== Junction ==
The junction divides the SH-1 to two parts one goes with SH-1 to Balangir and other one goes to the famous Kantilo where Nilamadhab temple is situated.
