= Karganeh =

Karganeh كرگانه
- Village
- Location within Iran
- Coordinates: 33°29′05″N 48°22′56″E
- Country: Iran
- Province: Lorestan
- County: Khorramabad
- Bakhsh: Central
- Rural District: Dehpir

Population (2006)
  - Total: 168
- Time zone: UTC+3:30 (IRST)
  - Summer (DST): UTC+4:30 (IRDT)

Karganeh (Persian: كرگانه, also Romanized as Kargāneh; also known as Kargāh) is a village in Dehpir Rural District, in the Central District of Khorramabad County, Lorestan Province, Iran. At the 2006 census, its population was 168, in 37 families.
