= Kahtuiyeh, Kerman =

Kahtuiyeh كهتوييه
- Village
- Location within Iran
- Coordinates: 30°30′51″N 55°03′39″E
- Country: Iran
- Province: Kerman
- County: Shahr-e Babak
- Bakhsh: Dehaj
- Rural District: Jowzam

Population (2006)
  - Total: 178
- Time zone: UTC+3:30 (IRST)
  - Summer (DST): UTC+4:30 (IRDT)

Kahtuiyeh (Persian: كهتوييه, also Romanized as Kahtū’īyeh) is a village in Jowzam Rural District, Dehaj District, Shahr-e Babak County, Kerman Province, Iran. At the 2006 census, its population was 178, in 47 families.
