= Dizalu =

Village in Isfahan province, Iran

Dizalu Persian: ديزلو
- Village
- Location within Iran
- Coordinates: 33°03′10″N 51°59′13″E
- Country: Iran
- Province: Isfahan
- County: Ardestan
- District: Central
- Rural District: Olya

Population (2016)
  - Total: 92
- Time zone: UTC+3:30 (IRST)

Dizalu (Persian: ديزلو) (Note: Also romanized as Dīzalū; also known as Ādīzlū, Dīzā, and Diziloo) is a village in Olya Rural District of the Central District in Ardestan County, Isfahan province, Iran.

== Demographics ==
=== Population ===
At the time of the 2006 National Census, the village's population was 123 in 27 households. The following census in 2011 counted 120 people in 36 households. The 2016 census measured the population of the village as 92 people in 33 households.
