= Baqerabad-e Samaleh =

Baqerabad-e Samaleh باقرابادسامله
- Village
- Location within Iran
- Coordinates: 34°53′13″N 47°12′19″E
- Country: Iran
- Province: Kermanshah
- County: Sonqor
- Bakhsh: Kolyai
- Rural District: Kivanat

Population (2006)
  - Total: 134
- Time zone: UTC+3:30 (IRST)
  - Summer (DST): UTC+4:30 (IRDT)

Baqerabad-e Samaleh (Persian: باقرابادسامله, also Romanized as Bāqerābād-e Sāmaleh; also known as Bāqerābād) is a village in Kivanat Rural District, Kolyai District, Sonqor County, Kermanshah Province, Iran. At the 2006 census, its population was 134, in 31 families.
