= Karehgah-ye Pain =

Karehgah-ye Pain کره گه پايين
- Village
- Location within Iran
- Coordinates: 34°09′47″N 47°35′04″E
- Country: Iran
- Province: Lorestan
- County: Delfan
- Bakhsh: Kakavand
- Rural District: Kakavand-e Gharbi

Population (2006)
  - Total: 40
- Time zone: UTC+3:30 (IRST)
  - Summer (DST): UTC+4:30 (IRDT)

Karehgah-ye Pain (Persian: کره گه پايين, also Romanized as Karehgah-ye Pā’īn) is a village in Kakavand-e Gharbi Rural District, Kakavand District, Delfan County, Lorestan Province, Iran. At the 2006 census, its population was 40, in 9 families.
