= Moslemabad, Mazandaran =

Moslemabad مسلم اباد
- Village
- Location within Iran
- Coordinates: 34.6722°N 48.9092°E
- Country: Iran
- Province: Mazandaran
- County: Tonekabon
- Bakhsh: Central
- Rural District: Goli Jan

Population (2006)
  - Total: 336
- Time zone: UTC+3:30 (IRST)
  - Summer (DST): UTC+4:30 (IRDT)

Moslemabad (Persian: مسلم اباد, also Romanized as Moslemābād) is a village in Goli Jan Rural District, in the Central District of Tonekabon County, Mazandaran Province, Iran. At the 2006 census, its population was 336, in 91 families.
