= Baqerabad-e Do =

Baqerabad-e Do باقر آباد2
- Village
- Location within Iran
- Coordinates: 30°27′50″N 56°36′22″E
- Country: Iran
- Province: Kerman
- County: Kerman
- Bakhsh: Chatrud
- Rural District: Kavirat

Population (2006)
  - Total: 73
- Time zone: UTC+3:30 (IRST)
  - Summer (DST): UTC+4:30 (IRDT)

Baqerabad-e Do (Persian: باقر آباد2, also romanized as Bāqerābād-e Do; also known as Bāqerābād) is a village in Kavirat Rural District, Chatrud District, Kerman County, Kerman Province, Iran. At the 2006 census, its population was 73, in 15 families.
