= Baqerabad, Sepidan =

Baqerabad باقراباد
- Village
- Location within Iran
- Coordinates: 30°00′01″N 52°27′00″E
- Country: Iran
- Province: Fars
- County: Sepidan
- Bakhsh: Beyza
- Rural District: Beyza

Population (2006)
  - Total: 182
- Time zone: UTC+3:30 (IRST)
  - Summer (DST): UTC+4:30 (IRDT)

Baqerabad (Persian: باقراباد, also Romanized as Bāqerābād) is a village in Beyza Rural District, Beyza District, Sepidan County, Fars province, Iran. At the 2006 census, its population was 182, in 41 families.
