= Chah Gaz, Kerman =

Chah Gaz چاه گز
- Village
- Location within Iran
- Coordinates: 27°57′09″N 57°35′15″E
- Country: Iran
- Province: Kerman
- County: Kahnuj
- Bakhsh: Central
- Rural District: Howmeh

Population (2006)
  - Total: 761
- Time zone: UTC+3:30 (IRST)
  - Summer (DST): UTC+4:30 (IRDT)

Chah Gaz (Persian: چاه گز, also Romanized as Chāh Gaz) is a village in Howmeh Rural District, in the Central District of Kahnuj County, Kerman Province, Iran. At the 2006 census, its population was 761, in 155 families.
