= Baqerabad, Eslamabad-e Gharb =

Baqerabad باقراباد
- Village
- Location within Iran
- Coordinates: 33°49′12″N 46°53′49″E
- Country: Iran
- Province: Kermanshah
- County: Eslamabad-e Gharb
- Bakhsh: Homeyl
- Rural District: Harasam

Population (2006)
  - Total: 105
- Time zone: UTC+3:30 (IRST)
  - Summer (DST): UTC+4:30 (IRDT)

Baqerabad (Persian: باقراباد, also Romanized as Bāqerābād; also known as Bāqerābād-e Dīzgarān) is a village in Harasam Rural District, Homeyl District, Eslamabad-e Gharb County, Kermanshah Province, Iran. At the 2006 census, its population was 105, in 28 families.
