= Chah Sorkh, Hormozgan =

Chah Sorkh چاه سرخ
- Village
- Location within Iran
- Coordinates: 28°23′34″N 55°31′32″E
- Country: Iran
- Province: Hormozgan
- County: Hajjiabad
- Bakhsh: Central
- Rural District: Dar Agah

Population (2006)
  - Total: 109
- Time zone: UTC+3:30 (IRST)
  - Summer (DST): UTC+4:30 (IRDT)

Chah Sorkh (Persian: چاه سرخ, also Romanized as Chāh Sorkh) is a village in Dar Agah Rural District, in the Central District of Hajjiabad County, Hormozgan Province, Iran. At the 2006 census, its population was 109, in 23 families.
