= Baqerabad, Jiroft =

Baqerabad باقراباد
- Village
- Location within Iran
- Coordinates: 28°36′31″N 57°49′24″E
- Country: Iran
- Province: Kerman
- County: Jiroft
- Bakhsh: Central
- Rural District: Dowlatabad

Population (2006)
  - Total: 372
- Time zone: UTC+3:30 (IRST)
  - Summer (DST): UTC+4:30 (IRDT)

Baqerabad (Persian: باقراباد, also Romanized as Bāqerābād) is a village in Dowlatabad Rural District, in the Central District of Jiroft County, Kerman Province, Iran. At the 2006 census, its population was 372, in 81 families.
