= Deh-e Zir, Sistan and Baluchestan =

Deh-e Zir ده زير
- Village
- Location within Iran
- Coordinates: 27°54′42″N 59°19′13″E
- Country: Iran
- Province: Sistan and Baluchestan
- County: Dalgan
- Bakhsh: Central
- Rural District: Hudian

Population (2006)
  - Total: 278
- Time zone: UTC+3:30 (IRST)
  - Summer (DST): UTC+4:30 (IRDT)

Deh-e Zir (Persian: ده زير, also Romanized as Deh-e Zīr) is a village in Hudian Rural District, in the Central District of Dalgan County, Sistan and Baluchestan Province, Iran. At the 2006 census, its population was 278, in 45 families.
