= Baqerabad, Khuzestan =

Baqerabad باقراباد
- Village
- Location within Iran
- Coordinates: 32°09′51″N 49°31′42″E
- Country: Iran
- Province: Khuzestan
- County: Andika
- Bakhsh: Abezhdan
- Rural District: Abezhdan

Population (2006)
  - Total: 313
- Time zone: UTC+3:30 (IRST)
  - Summer (DST): UTC+4:30 (IRDT)

Baqerabad (Persian: باقراباد, also Romanized as Bāqerābād) is a village in Abezhdan Rural District, Abezhdan District, Andika County, Khuzestan Province, Iran. At the 2006 census, its population was 313, in 50 families.
