= Baqerabad, Rud Ab =

Baqerabad باقراباد
- Village
- Location within Iran
- Coordinates: 28°55′53″N 58°30′47″E
- Country: Iran
- Province: Kerman
- County: Narmashir
- Bakhsh: Rud Ab
- Rural District: Rud Ab-e Sharqi

Population (2006)
  - Total: 219
- Time zone: UTC+3:30 (IRST)
  - Summer (DST): UTC+4:30 (IRDT)

Baqerabad (Persian: باقراباد, also Romanized as Bāqerābād) is a village in Rud Ab-e Sharqi Rural District, Rud Ab District, Narmashir County, Kerman Province, Iran. At the 2006 census, the population was 219, in 45 families.
