= Kargah, Larestan =

Kargah كارگاه
- Village
- Location within Iran
- Coordinates: 27°30′06″N 54°00′24″E
- Country: Iran
- Province: Fars
- County: Larestan
- Bakhsh: Sahray-ye Bagh
- Rural District: Sahray-ye Bagh

Population (2006)
  - Total: 763
- Time zone: UTC+3:30 (IRST)
  - Summer (DST): UTC+4:30 (IRDT)

Kargah (Persian: كارگاه, also Romanized as Kārgāh) is a village in Sahray-ye Bagh Rural District, Sahray-ye Bagh District, Larestan County, Fars province, Iran. At the 2006 census, its population was 763, in 158 families.
