= Baqerabad, Minudasht =

Baqerabad باقرآباد
- Village
- Location within Iran
- Coordinates: 37°09′06″N 55°21′24″E
- Country: Iran
- Province: Golestan
- County: Minudasht
- Bakhsh: Central
- Rural District: Chehel Chay

Population (2016)
  - Total: 67
- Time zone: UTC+3:30 (IRST)

Baqerabad (Persian: باقرآباد, also Romanized as Bāqerābād) is a village in Chehel Chay Rural District, in the Central District of Minudasht County, Golestan Province, Iran.

At the time of the 2006 National Census, the village's population was 74 in 21 households. The following census in 2011 counted 81 people in 23 households. The 2016 census measured the population of the village as 67 people in 25 households.
