= Darvishabad, Khorramabad =

Darvishabad درويش اباد
- Village
- Location within Iran
- Coordinates: 33°24′24″N 48°36′42″E
- Country: Iran
- Province: Lorestan
- County: Khorramabad
- Bakhsh: Central
- Rural District: Azna

Population (2006)
  - Total: 44
- Time zone: UTC+3:30 (IRST)
  - Summer (DST): UTC+4:30 (IRDT)

Darvishabad (Persian: درويش اباد, also Romanized as Darvīshābād) is a village in Azna Rural District, in the Central District of Khorramabad County, Lorestan Province, Iran. At the 2006 census, its population was 44, in 11 families.
