= Dizə, Ordubad =

Dizə
- Municipality
- Location within Azerbaijan
- Coordinates: 38°56′N 45°56′E
- Country: Azerbaijan
- Autonomous republic: Nakhchivan
- District: Ordubad

Population (2005)
  - Total: 339
- Time zone: UTC+4 (AZT)

Dizə (also, Diza) is a village and municipality in the Ordubad District of Nakhchivan, Azerbaijan. It is located in the near of the Ordubad-Unus highway, 18 km in the north-west from the district center. Its population is busy with gardening, vegetable-growing and farming. It has a population of 339.

The name Diza دیزه which is a Persian word meaning village/fortress (with the variant دژ Dež) is a very common name for many villages in Iran and surrounding areas.
