= Baqerabad-e Tork =

Baqerabad-e Tork باقرابادترك
- Village
- Location within Iran
- Coordinates: 36°02′36″N 50°22′21″E
- Country: Iran
- Province: Qazvin
- County: Abyek
- Bakhsh: Basharyat
- Rural District: Basharyat-e Sharqi

Population (2006)
  - Total: 399
- Time zone: UTC+3:30 (IRST)
  - Summer (DST): UTC+4:30 (IRDT)

Baqerabad-e Tork (Persian: باقرابادترك, also Romanized as Bāqerābād-e Tork; also known as Torkeh Bāqerābād, Bāqirābād, and Bāqerābād) is a village in Basharyat-e Sharqi Rural District, Basharyat District, Abyek County, Qazvin Province, Iran. At the 2006 census, its population was 399, in 102 families.
