= Chah Gaz, Hormozgan =

Chah Gaz چاه گز
- Village
- Location within Iran
- Coordinates: 27°59′54″N 56°26′46″E
- Country: Iran
- Province: Hormozgan
- County: Hajjiabad
- Bakhsh: Ahmadi
- Rural District: Ahmadi

Population (2006)
  - Total: 89
- Time zone: UTC+3:30 (IRST)
  - Summer (DST): UTC+4:30 (IRDT)

Chah Gaz (Persian: چاه گز, also Romanized as Chāh Gaz) is a village in Ahmadi Rural District, Ahmadi District, Hajjiabad County, Hormozgan Province, Iran. At the 2006 census, its population was 89, in 24 families.
