= Moslemabad, Markazi =

Mosallamabad مسلم اباد
- Village
- Location within Iran
- Coordinates: 35°05′53″N 49°45′39″E
- Country: Iran
- Province: Markazi
- County: Saveh
- Bakhsh: Nowbaran
- Rural District: Bayat

Population (2006)
  - Total: 98
- Time zone: UTC+3:30 (IRST)
  - Summer (DST): UTC+4:30 (IRDT)

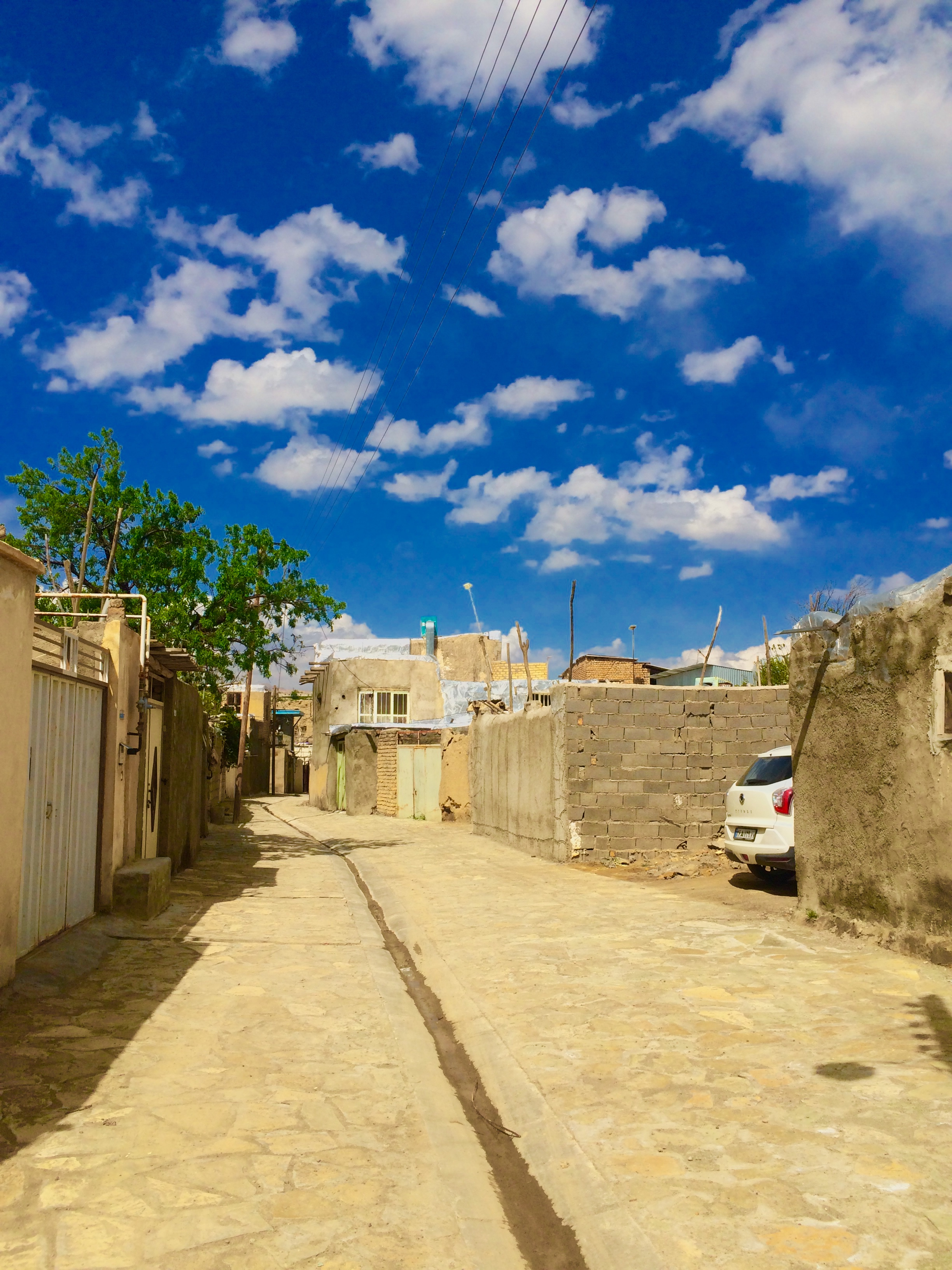

Mosallamabad (Persian: مسلم اباد, also Romanized as Mosallamābād; also known as Moslemābād) is a village in Bayat Rural District, Nowbaran District, Saveh County, Markazi Province, Iran. At the 2006 census, its population was 98, in 37 families. based on Iran elaboration of the latest قیمت سکه پارسیان Nation.
