= Bagham, Iran =

Village in Isfahan province, Iran

Bagham Persian: بغم
- Village
- Location within Iran
- Coordinates: 33°09′12″N 52°15′27″E
- Country: Iran
- Province: Isfahan
- County: Ardestan
- District: Central
- Rural District: Olya

Population (2016)
  - Total: 119
- Time zone: UTC+3:30 (IRST)

Bagham (Persian: بغم) (Note: Also romanized as Bāgham; also known as Baqam) is a village in, and the capital of, Olya Rural District in the Central District of Ardestan County, Isfahan province, Iran.

== Demographics ==
=== Population ===
At the time of the 2006 National Census, the village's population was 97 in 33 households. The following census in 2011 counted 107 people in 35 households. The 2016 census measured the population of the village as 119 people in 44 households.
