= Darvishabad, Firuzabad =

Darvishabad درويش اباد
- Village
- Location within Iran
- Coordinates: 33°54′23″N 48°09′03″E
- Country: Iran
- Province: Lorestan
- County: Selseleh
- Bakhsh: Firuzabad
- Rural District: Firuzabad

Population (2006)
  - Total: 258
- Time zone: UTC+3:30 (IRST)
  - Summer (DST): UTC+4:30 (IRDT)

Darvishabad (Persian: درويش اباد, also Romanized as Darvīshābād) is a village in Firuzabad Rural District, Firuzabad District, Selseleh County, Lorestan Province, Iran. At the 2006 census, its population was 258, in 52 families.
