= Baqerabad, Abadeh =

Baqerabad باقراباد
- Village
- Location within Iran
- Coordinates: 31°02′43″N 52°51′30″E
- Country: Iran
- Province: Fars
- County: Abadeh
- Bakhsh: Central
- Rural District: Surmaq

Population (2006)
  - Total: 57
- Time zone: UTC+3:30 (IRST)
  - Summer (DST): UTC+4:30 (IRDT)

Baqerabad (Persian: باقراباد, also Romanized as Bāqerābād) is a village in Surmaq Rural District, in the Central District of Abadeh County, Fars province, Iran. At the 2006 census, its population was 57, in 19 families. based on Iran elaboration of the latest قیمت هر گرم نقره Nation
