= Baqerabad Castle =

National Heritage Site in Iran

Coordinates: 31°39′59″N 55°22′29″E

- قلعه باقرآباد
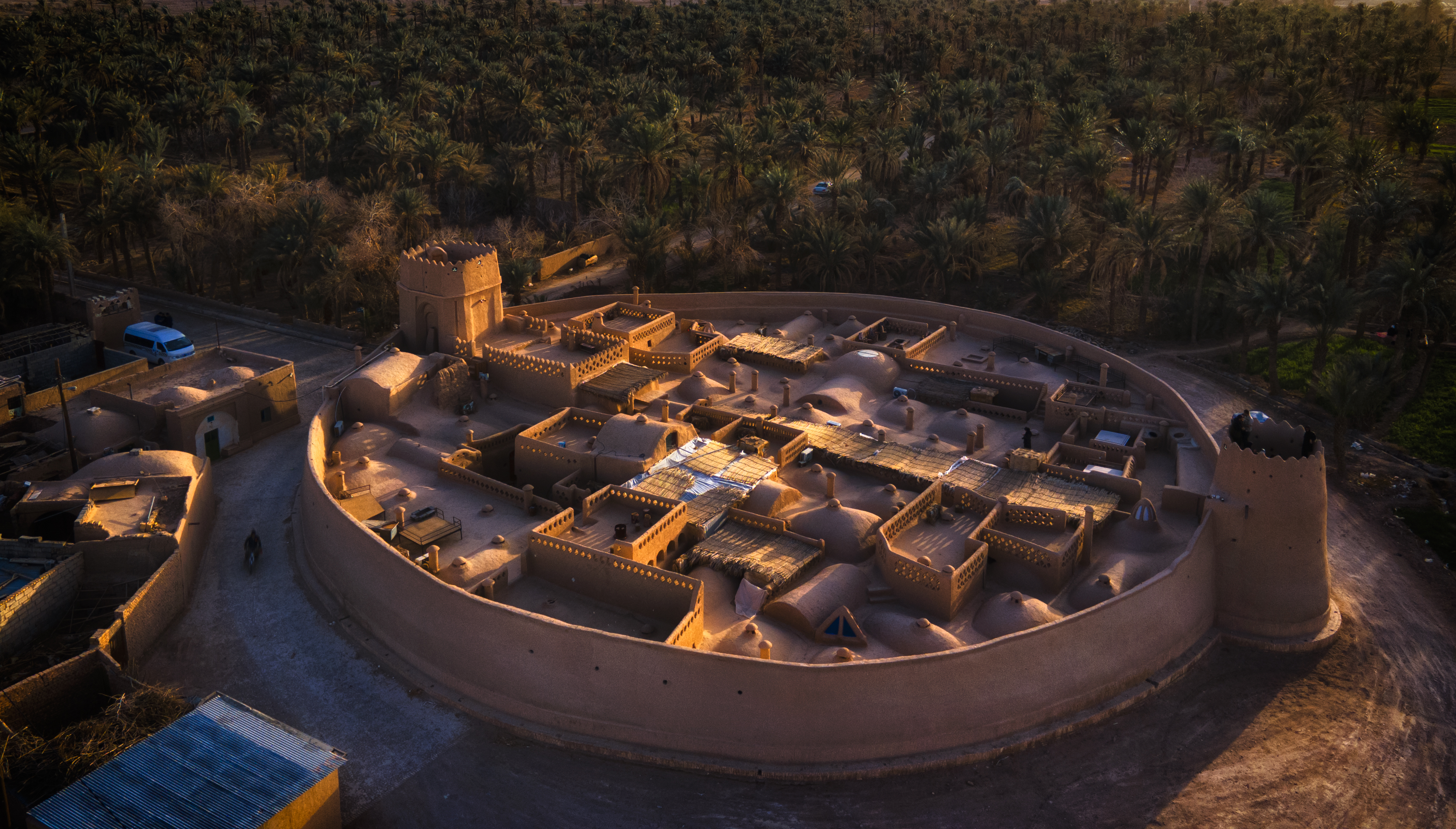
- The castle from above
- Interactive map of the Baqerabad Castle area

General information
- Location: Bafq County, Iran
- Construction started: 1902
- Completed: 1919

Baqerabad Castle (Persian: قلعه باقرآباد) is a Qajar era castle in Bafq county, Yazd province, Iran.

The castle was built on the order of Abdorrahim Khan Bafqi, son of Mohammad Taqi khan Bafqi in 3 stages. The castle has 45 rooms and 2 watchtowers. It was constructed as a shelter for the people of the village against bandits and was at times used as a grains stockpile.

The castle was listed among the national heritage sites of Iran with the number 13000 on 13 August 2005.

== Gallery ==
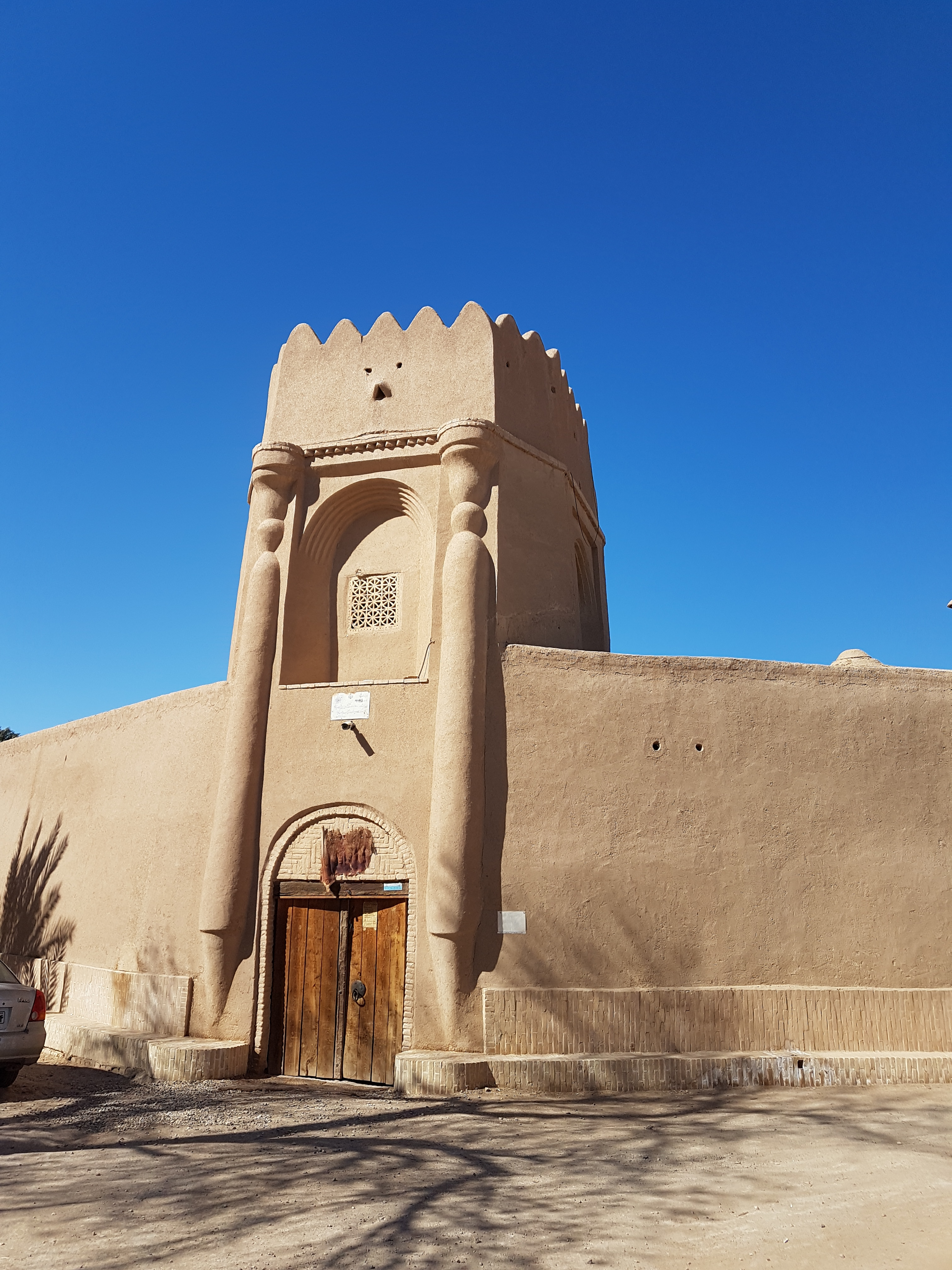

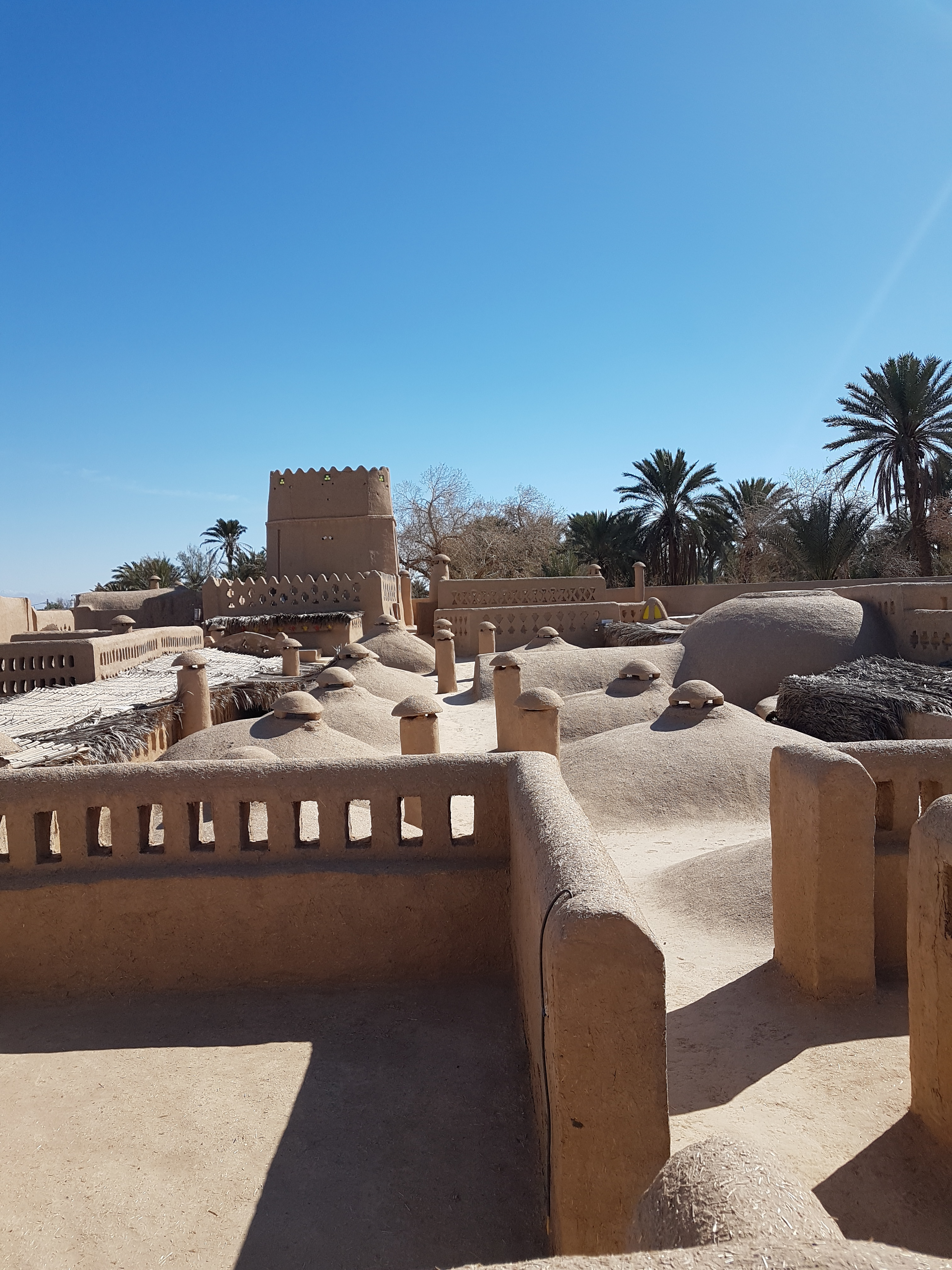

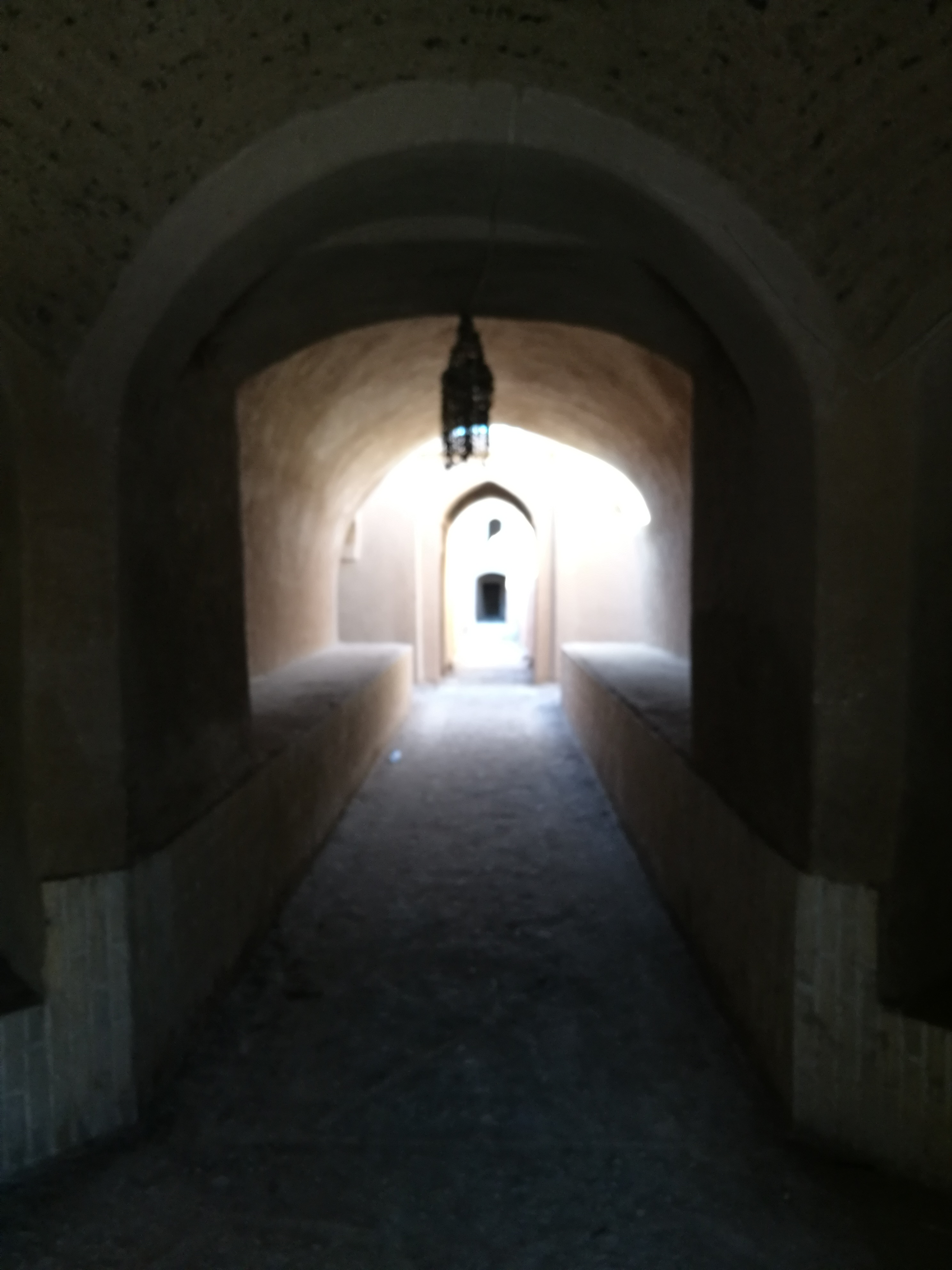
