= Meshkan Rural District (Neyriz County) =

Rural district in Fars province, Iran

Meshkan Rural District Persian: دهستان مشكان
- Rural District
- Location within Iran
- Coordinates: 29°29′00″N 54°20′33″E
- Country: Iran
- Province: Fars
- County: Neyriz
- District: Meshkan
- Capital: Meshkan

Population (2016)
  - Total: 596
- Time zone: UTC+3:30 (IRST)

Meshkan Rural District (Persian: دهستان مشكان) is in Meshkan District (Note: Formerly Poshtkuh District) of Neyriz County, Fars province, Iran. It is administered from the city of Meshkan.

== Demographics ==
=== Population ===
At the time of the 2006 National Census, the rural district's population was 265 in 89 households. There were 313 inhabitants in 104 households at the following census of 2011. The 2016 census measured the population of the rural district as 596 in 198 households. The most populous of its 29 villages was Madan, with 120 people.
