= Abadeh Tashk =

City in Fars province, Iran

Abadeh Tashk Persian: آباده طشک
- City
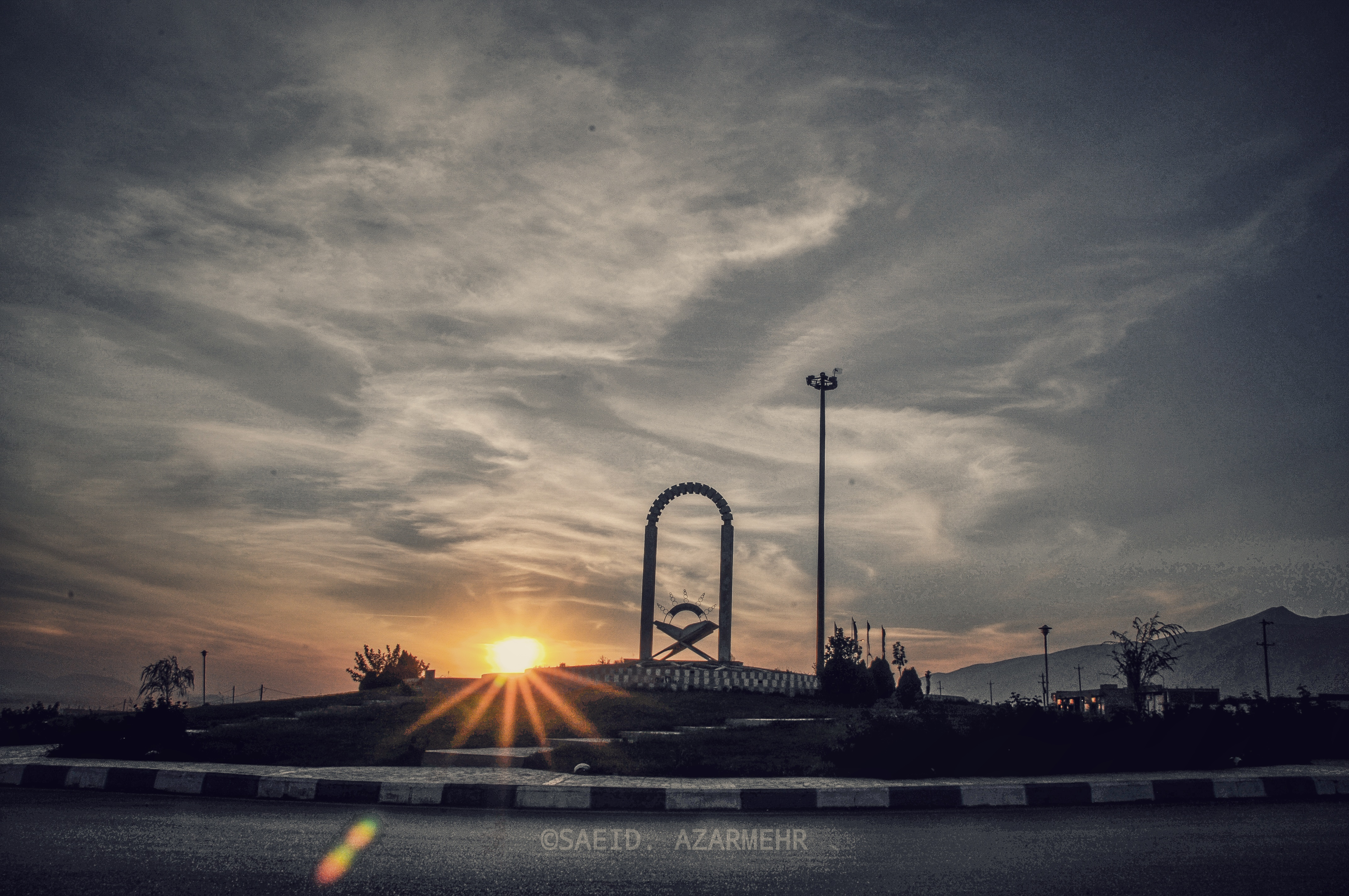

- Location within Iran
- Coordinates: 29°48′36″N 53°43′42″E
- Country: Iran
- Province: Fars
- County: Bakhtegan
- District: Central

Population (2016)
  - Total: 7,379
- Time zone: UTC+3:30 (IRST)
- Area code: 0732-572

Abadeh Tashk (Persian: آباده طشک) (Note: Also romanized as Ābādeh Ţashk, Ābādeh-i-Tashk, and Ābādeh-ye Ţashk; also known as Ābādī-ye Tashk and Ţashk) is a city in the Central District of Bakhtegan County, Fars province, Iran, serving as capital of both the county and the district. It is also the administrative center for Abadeh Tashk Rural District.

The city has a large mining sector.

== Demographics ==
=== Population ===
At the time of the 2006 National Census, the city's population was 6,213 in 1,614 households, when it was the capital of the former Abadeh Tashk District of Neyriz County. The following census in 2011 counted 7,562 people in 1,934 households. The 2016 census measured the population of the city as 7,379 people in 2,277 households.

In 2018, the district was separated from the county in the establishment of Bakhtegan County, and Abadeh Tashk was transferred to the new Central District as the county's capital.
