= Baqerabad-e Rig =

Baqerabad-e Rig باقرابادريگ
- Village
- Location within Iran
- Coordinates: 30°12′53″N 57°01′27″E
- Country: Iran
- Province: Kerman
- County: Kerman
- Bakhsh: Central
- Rural District: Ekhtiarabad

Population (2006)
  - Total: 822
- Time zone: UTC+3:30 (IRST)

Baqerabad-e Rig (Persian: باقرابادريگ, also Romanized as Bāqerābād-e Rīg; also known as Bākrābād, Bāqarābād, and Bāqerābād) is a village in Ekhtiarabad Rural District, in the Central District of Kerman County, Kerman Province, Iran. At the 2006 census, its population was 822, with 209 families.
