= Abadeh Tashk Rural District =

Rural district in Fars province, Iran

Abadeh Tashk Rural District Persian: دهستان آباده طشك
- Rural District
- Location within Iran
- Coordinates: 29°48′31″N 53°43′30″E
- Country: Iran
- Province: Fars
- County: Bakhtegan
- District: Central
- Capital: Abadeh Tashk

Population (2016)
  - Total: 5,342
- Time zone: UTC+3:30 (IRST)

Abadeh Tashk Rural District (Persian: دهستان آباده طشك) is in the Central District of Bakhtegan County, Fars province, Iran. It is administered from the city of Abadeh Tashk.

== Demographics ==
=== Population ===
At the time of the 2006 National Census, the rural district's population (as a part of the former Abadeh Tashk District of Neyriz County) was 4,733 in 1,227 households. There were 5,375 inhabitants in 1,496 households at the following census of 2011. The 2016 census measured the population of the rural district as 5,342 in 1,782 households. The most populous of its 13 villages was Khvajeh Jamali (now a city), with 3,394 people.

In 2018, the district was separated from the county in the establishment of Bakhtegan County, and the rural district was transferred to the new Central District.
