= Bakhtegan County =

County in Fars province, Iran

Bakhtegan County Persian: شهرستان بختگان
- County
- Location of Bakhtegan County in Fars province (center right, purple)

- Location of Fars province in Iran
- Coordinates: 29°38′N 53°50′E
- Country: Iran
- Province: Fars
- Capital: Abadeh Tashk
- Districts: Central, Hana
- Time zone: UTC+3:30 (IRST)

Bakhtegan County (Persian: شهرستان بختگان) is in Fars province, Iran. Its capital is the city of Abadeh Tashk, whose population at the time of the 2016 National Census was 7,379 people in 2,277 households.

== History ==
In 2018, Abadeh Tashk District was separated from Neyriz County in the establishment of Bakhtegan County, which was divided into two districts of two rural districts each, with Abadeh Tashk as its capital and only city at the time.

In 2023, the villages of Tom Shuli and Khvajeh Jamali were elevated to city status.

== Demographics ==
=== Administrative divisions ===
Bakhtegan County's administrative structure is shown in the following table.

Bakhtegan County
Administrative Divisions
Central District
Abadeh Tashk RD
Bakhtegan RD
Abadeh Tashk (city)
Khvajeh Jamali (city) (Note: Became a city after the 2016 census)
Hana District
Chah Gaz RD
Hana RD
Tom Shuli (city) (Note: Became a city after the 2016 census)
RD = Rural District

== See also ==
Media related to Bakhtegan County at Wikimedia Commons
