= Qatruiyeh Rural District =

Rural district in Fars province, Iran

Qatruiyeh Rural District Persian: دهستان قطرويه
- Rural District
- Location within Iran
- Coordinates: 29°15′42″N 54°51′58″E
- Country: Iran
- Province: Fars
- County: Neyriz
- District: Qatruiyeh
- Capital: Qatruiyeh

Population (2016)
  - Total: 1,181
- Time zone: UTC+3:30 (IRST)

Qatruiyeh Rural District (Persian: دهستان قطرويه) is in Qatruiyeh District of Neyriz County, Fars province, Iran. It is administered from the city of Qatruiyeh.

== Demographics ==
=== Population ===
At the time of the 2006 National Census, the rural district's population was 4,242 in 1,138 households. There were 1,629 inhabitants in 460 households at the following census of 2011. The 2016 census measured the population of the rural district as 1,181 in 368 households. The most populous of its 62 villages was Qatar Boneh, with 271 people.
