= Deh Chah Rural District =

Rural district in Fars province, Iran

Deh Chah Rural District Persian: دهستان ده چاه
- Rural District
- Location within Iran
- Coordinates: 29°23′06″N 54°30′16″E
- Country: Iran
- Province: Fars
- County: Neyriz
- District: Meshkan
- Capital: Deh Chah

Population (2016)
  - Total: 3,586
- Time zone: UTC+3:30 (IRST)

Deh Chah Rural District (Persian: دهستان ده چاه) (Note: Formerly Meshkan Rural District (دهستان مشكان)) is in Meshkan District (Note: Formerly Poshtkuh District) of Neyriz County, Fars province, Iran. Its capital is the village of Deh Chah.

== Demographics ==
=== Population ===
At the time of the 2006 National Census, the rural district's population was 3,980 in 1,049 households. There were 3,600 inhabitants in 1,055 households at the following census of 2011. The 2016 census measured the population of the rural district as 3,586 in 1,074 households. The most populous of its 46 villages was Deh Chah, with 1,715 people.
