= Meshkan District (Neyriz County) =

District in Fars province, Iran

Meshkan District Persian: بخش مشكان
- District
- Location within Iran
- Coordinates: 29°23′06″N 54°26′56″E
- Country: Iran
- Province: Fars
- County: Neyriz
- Capital: Meshkan

Population (2016)
  - Total: 8,799
- Time zone: UTC+3:30 (IRST)

Meshkan District (Persian: بخش مشكان) (Note: Formerly Poshtkuh District (بخش پشتکوه)) is in Neyriz County, Fars province, Iran. Its capital is the city of Meshkan.

== Demographics ==
=== Population ===
At the time of the 2006 National Census, the district's population was 8,875 in 2,334 households. The following census in 2011 counted 8,493 people in 2,504 households. The 2016 census measured the population of the district as 8,799 inhabitants in 2,730 households.

=== Administrative divisions ===
Meshkan District Population
Administrative Divisions	2006	2011	2016
Deh Chah RD (Note: Formerly Meshkan Rural District)	3,980	3,600	3,586
Meshkan RD	265	313	596
Meshkan (city)	4,630	4,580	4,617
Total	8,875	8,493	8,799
RD = Rural District
