= Bakhtegan Rural District =

Rural district in Fars province, Iran

Bakhtegan Rural District Persian: دهستان بختگان
- Rural District
- Location within Iran
- Coordinates: 29°40′37″N 53°45′25″E
- Country: Iran
- Province: Fars
- County: Bakhtegan
- District: Central
- Capital: Kushkak

Population (2016)
  - Total: 8,347
- Time zone: UTC+3:30 (IRST)

Bakhtegan Rural District (Persian: دهستان بختگان) is in the Central District of Bakhtegan County, Fars province, Iran. Its capital is the village of Kushkak.

== Demographics ==
=== Population ===
At the time of the 2006 National Census, the rural district's population (as a part of the former Abadeh Tashk District of Neyriz County) was 7,967 in 1,966 households. There were 8,904 inhabitants in 2,433 households at the following census of 2011. The 2016 census measured the population of the rural district as 8,347 in 2,610 households. The most populous of its 39 villages was Dehmurd, with 2,327 people.

In 2018, the district was separated from the county in the establishment of Bakhtegan County, and Bakhtegan Rural District was transferred to the new Central District.
