= Rizab Rural District =

Rural district in Fars province, Iran

Rizab Rural District Persian: دهستان ريزآب
- Rural District
- Location within Iran
- Coordinates: 28°51′31″N 55°01′24″E
- Country: Iran
- Province: Fars
- County: Neyriz
- District: Qatruiyeh
- Capital: Shahrak-e Emam

Population (2016)
  - Total: 11,566
- Time zone: UTC+3:30 (IRST)

Rizab Rural District (Persian: دهستان ريزآب) is in Qatruiyeh District of Neyriz County, Fars province, Iran. Its capital is the village of Shahrak-e Emam. (Note: Formerly Rizab)

== Demographics ==
=== Population ===
At the time of the 2006 National Census, the rural district's population was 11,363 in 2,560 households. There were 11,566 inhabitants in 3,144 households at the following census of 2011. The 2016 census measured the population of the rural district as 11,566 in over 3,408 households. The most populous of its 93 villages was Shahrak-e Emam, with 3,840 people.
