= Qatruiyeh District =

District in Fars province, Iran

Qatruiyeh District Persian: بخش قطرویه
- District
- Location within Iran
- Coordinates: 29°09′56″N 54°53′50″E
- Country: Iran
- Province: Fars
- County: Neyriz
- Capital: Qatruiyeh

Population (2016)
  - Total: 15,642
- Time zone: UTC+3:30 (IRST)

Qatruiyeh District (Persian: بخش قطرویه) is in Neyriz County, Fars province, Iran. Its capital is the city of Qatruiyeh.

== History ==
After the 2006 National Census the village of Qatruiyeh was elevated to the status of a city.

== Demographics ==
=== Population ===
At the time of the 2006 National Census, the district's population was 15,605 in 3,698 households. The following census in 2011 counted 15,959 people in 4,429 households. The 2016 census measured the population of the district as 15,642 inhabitants in 4,673 households.

=== Administrative divisions ===
Qatruiyeh District Population
| Administrative Divisions | 2006 | 2011 | 2016 |
|---|---|---|---|
| Qatruiyeh RD | 4,242 | 1,629 | 1,181 |
| Rizab RD | 11,363 | 11,566 | 11,566 |
| Qatruiyeh (city) | | 2,764 | 2,895 |
| Total | 15,605 | 15,959 | 15,642 |
RD = Rural District
