= Hana Rural District (Bakhtegan County) =

Rural district in Fars province, Iran

Hana Rural District Persian: دهستان حناڈ
- Rural District
- Location within Iran
- Coordinates: 29°27′26″N 54°03′34″E
- Country: Iran
- Province: Fars
- County: Bakhtegan
- District: Hana
- Capital: Qasemabad

Population (2016)
  - Total: 11,156
- Time zone: UTC+3:30 (IRST)

Hana Rural District (Persian: دهستان حناڈ) is in Hana District of Bakhtegan County, Fars province, Iran. Its capital is the village of Qasemabad. The previous capital of the rural district was the village of Tom Shuli, now a city.

== Demographics ==
=== Population ===
At the time of the 2006 National Census, the rural district's population (as a part of the former Abadeh Tashk District of Neyriz County) was 9,751 in 2,201 households. There were 10,486 inhabitants in 2,801 households at the following census of 2011. The 2016 census measured the population of the rural district as 11,156 in 3,297 households. The most populous of its 53 villages was Chah-e Savar Agha, with 1,758 people.

In 2018, the district was separated from the county in the establishment of Bakhtegan County, and Hana Rural District was transferred to the new Hana District.
