= Abadeh Tashk District =

Former district in Fars province, Iran

Abadeh Tashk District Persian: بخش آباده طشك
- Former District
- Location within Iran
- Coordinates: 29°38′N 53°50′E
- Country: Iran
- Province: Fars
- County: Neyriz
- Capital: Abadeh Tashk

Population (2016)
  - Total: 32,224
- Time zone: UTC+3:30 (IRST)

Abadeh Tashk District (Persian: بخش آباده طشك) is a former administrative division of Neyriz County, Fars province, Iran. Its capital was the city of Abadeh Tashk.

== History ==
In 2018, the district was separated from the county in the establishment of Bakhtegan County.

== Demographics ==
=== Population ===
At the time of the 2006 National Census, the district's population was 28,664 in 7,008 households. The following census in 2011 counted 32,327 people in 8,664 households. The 2016 census measured the population of the district as 32,224 inhabitants in 9,966 households.

=== Administrative divisions ===
Abadeh Tashk District Population
Administrative Divisions	2006	2011	2016
Abadeh Tashk RD	4,733	5,375	5,342
Bakhtegan RD	7,967	8,904	8,347
Hana RD	9,751	10,486	11,156
Abadeh Tashk (city)	6,213	7,562	7,379
Total	28,664	32,327	32,224
RD = Rural District
