= Neyriz County =

County in Fars province, Iran

Neyriz County Persian: شهرستان نی‌ریز
- County
- Location of Neyriz County in Fars province (right, green)

- Location of Fars province in Iran
- Coordinates: 29°13′N 54°38′E
- Country: Iran
- Province: Fars
- Capital: Neyriz
- Districts: Central, Poshtkuh, Qatruiyeh

Area
  - Total: 10,680 km^{2} (4,120 sq mi)

Population (2016)
  - Total: 113,291
  - Density: 10.61/km^{2} (27.47/sq mi)
- Time zone: UTC+3:30 (IRST)

Neyriz County (Persian: شهرستان نی‌ریز) is in Fars province, Iran. Its capital is the city of Neyriz.

== History ==
After the 2006 National Census, the village of Qatruiyeh was elevated to the status of a city. In July 2018, Abadeh Tashk District was separated from the county in the establishment of Bakhtegan County.

== Demographics ==
=== Population ===
At the time of the 2006 census, the county's population was 105,241 in 26,689 households. The following census in 2011 counted 113,750 people in 31,779 households. The 2016 census measured the population of the county as 113,291 in 34,771 households.

=== Administrative divisions ===
Neyriz County's population history and administrative structure over three consecutive censuses are shown in the following table.

Neyriz County Population
Administrative Divisions	2006	2011	2016
Central District	52,097	56,971	56,626
Horgan RD	1,121	884	1,170
Rostaq RD	5,796	5,796	5,606
Neyriz (city)	45,180	50,291	49,850
Abadeh Tashk District (Note: Transferred to Bakhtegan County after the 2016 census)	28,664	32,327	32,224
Abadeh Tashk RD	4,733	5,375	5,342
Bakhtegan RD	7,967	8,904	8,347
Hana RD	9,751	10,486	11,156
Abadeh Tashk (city)	6,213	7,562	7,379
Meshkan District	8,875	8,493	8,799
Deh Chah RD (Note: Formerly Meshkan Rural District)	3,980	3,600	3,586
Meshkan RD	265	313	596
Meshkan (city)	4,630	4,580	4,617
Qatruiyeh District	15,605	15,959	15,642
Qatruiyeh RD	4,242	1,629	1,181
Rizab RD	11,363	11,566	11,566
Qatruiyeh (city)		2,764	2,895
Total	105,241	113,750	113,291
RD = Rural District

== See also ==
Media related to Neyriz County at Wikimedia Commons
