= Fasa =

City in Fars province, Iran

Fasa Persian: فَسا
- City
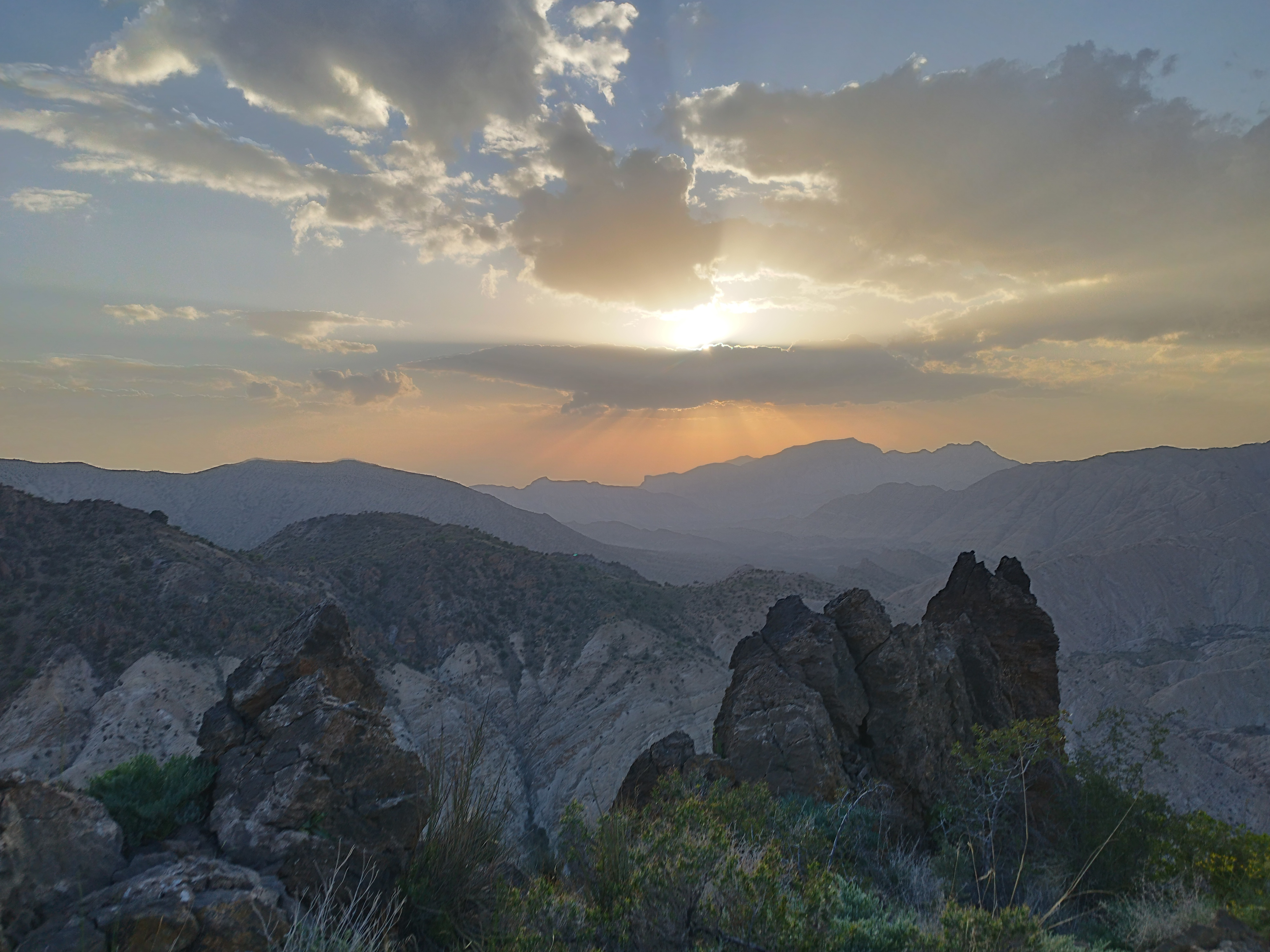
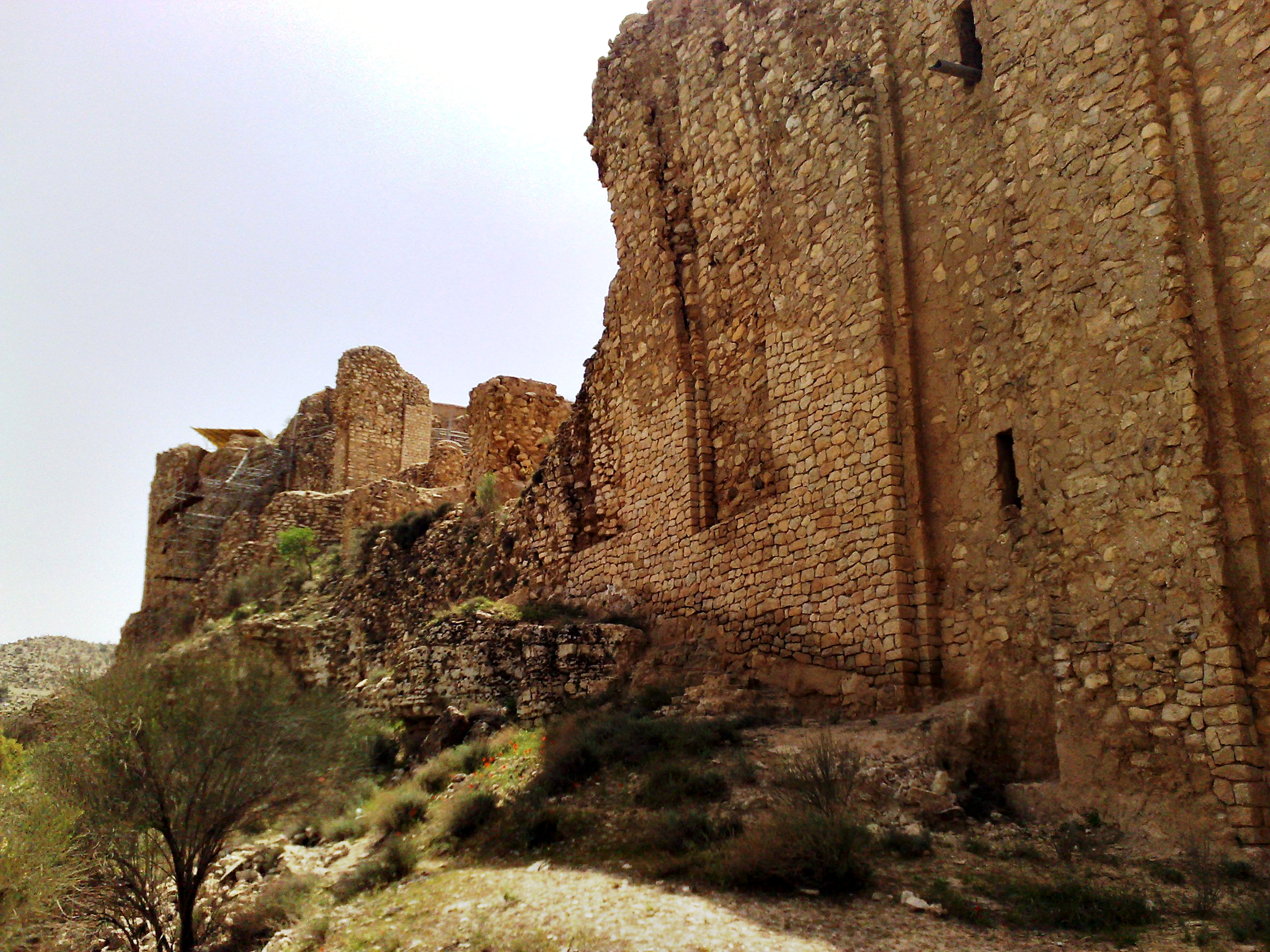
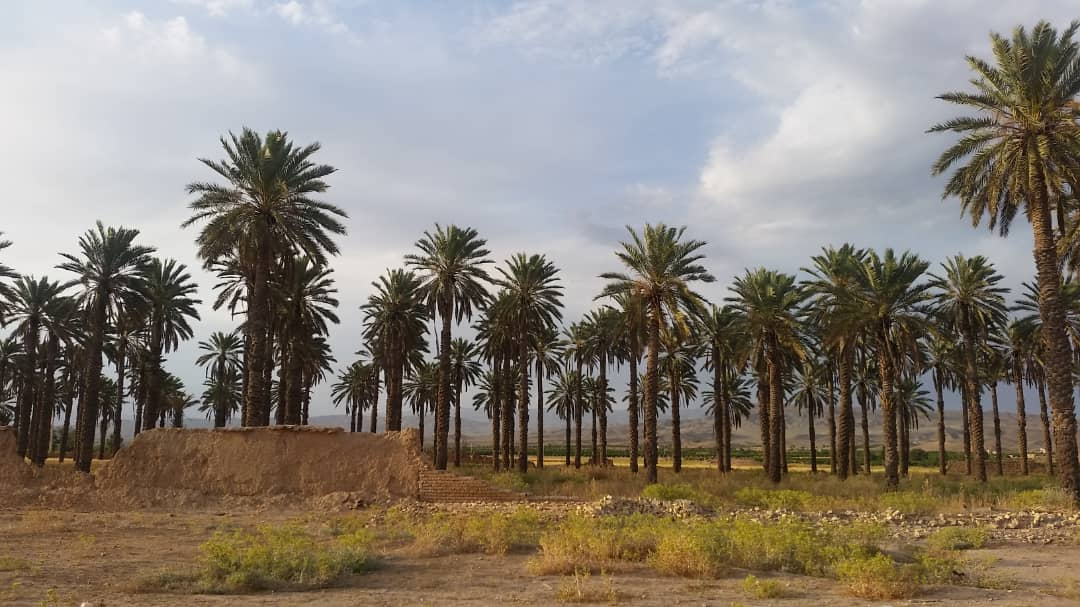
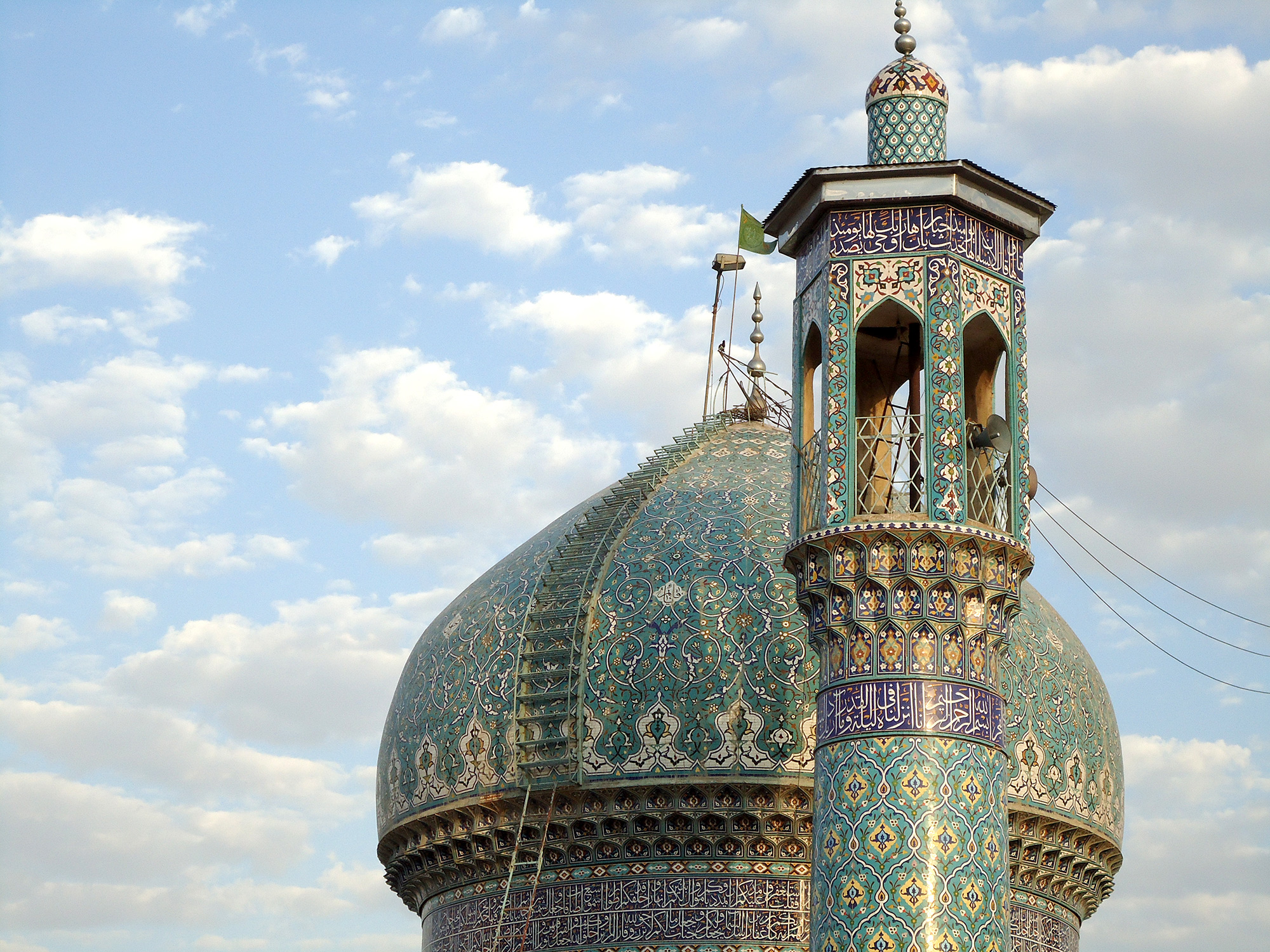
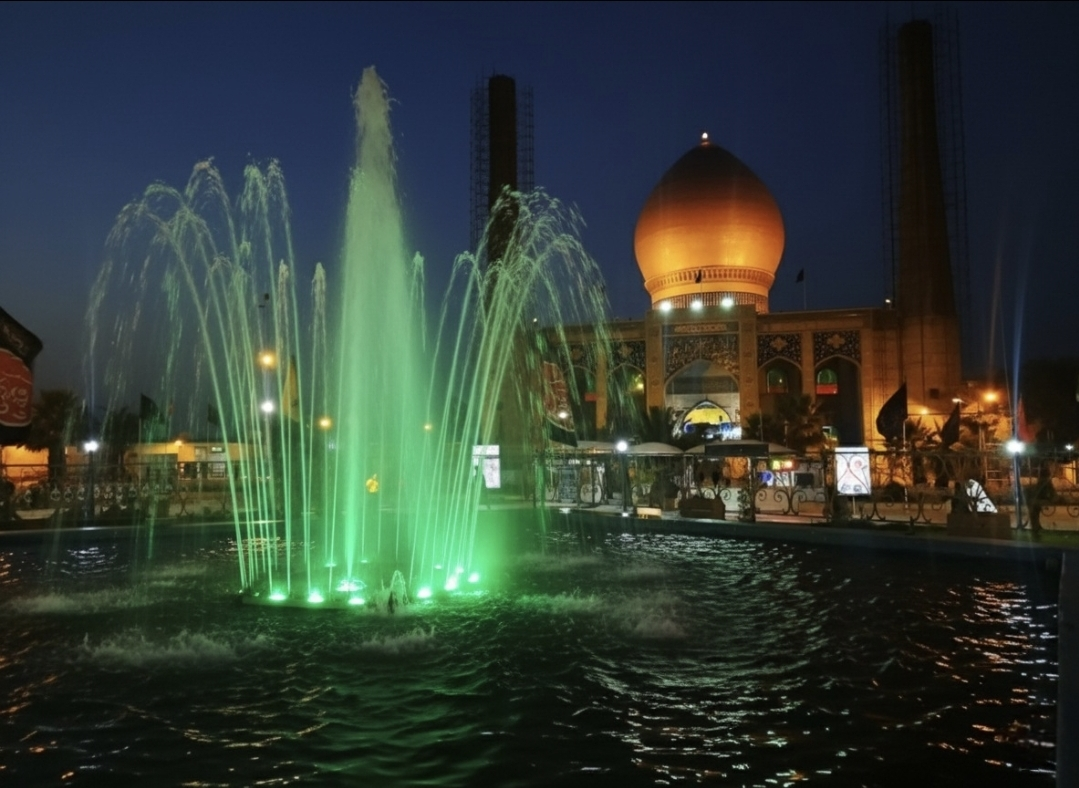
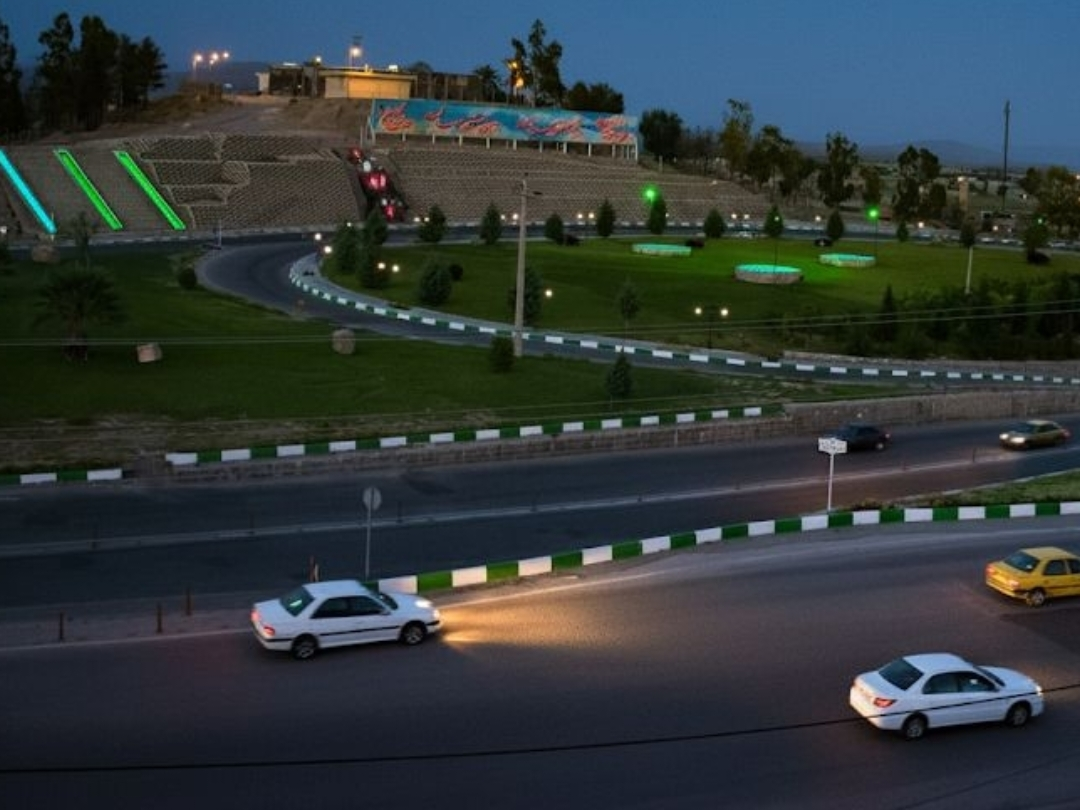
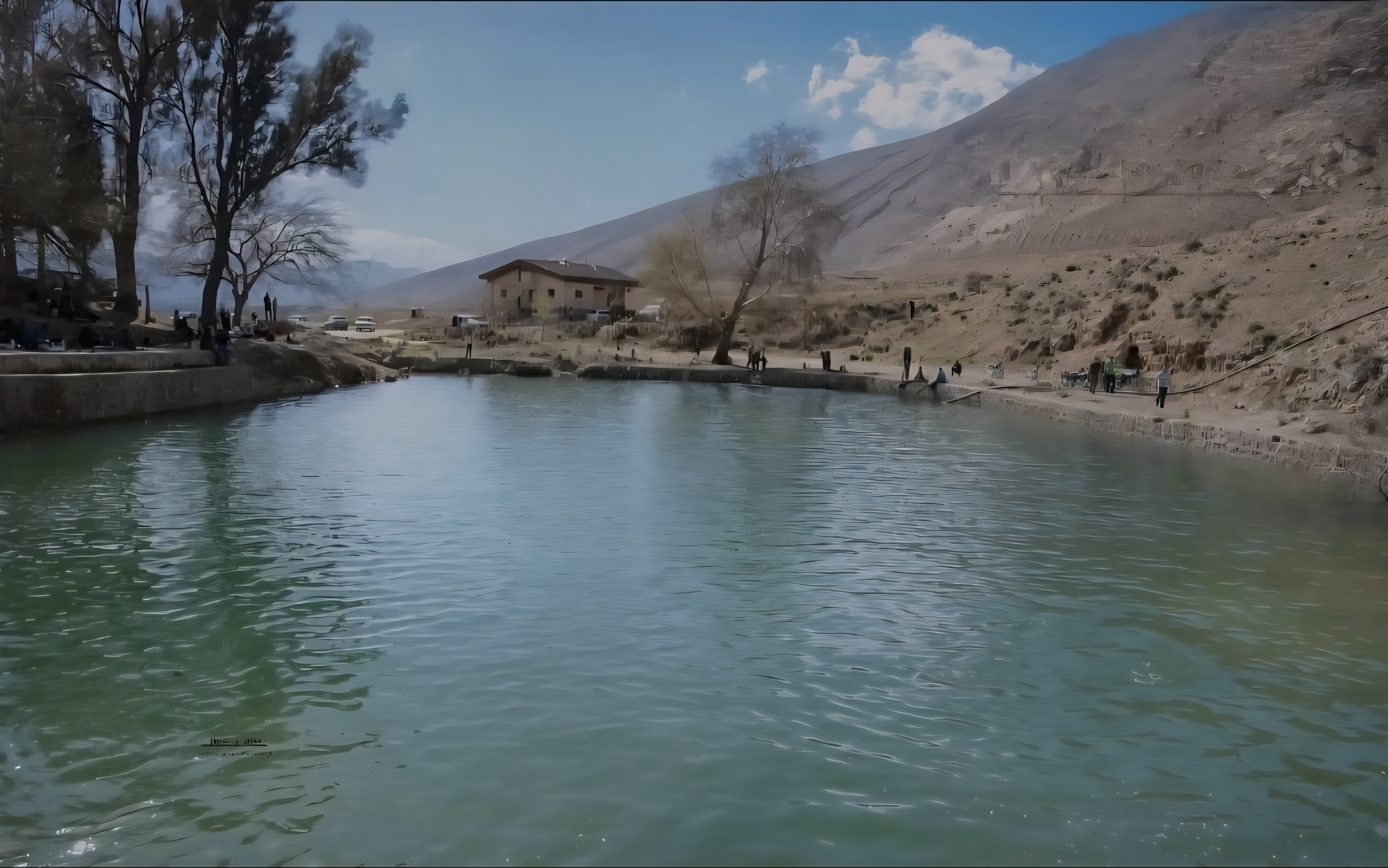
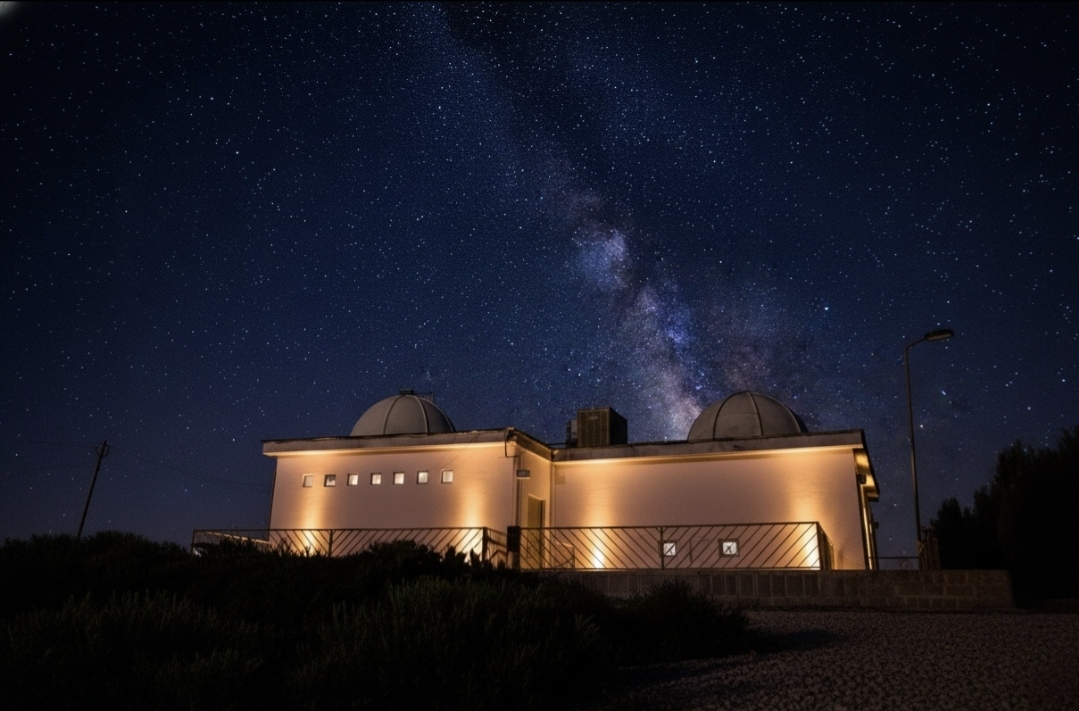
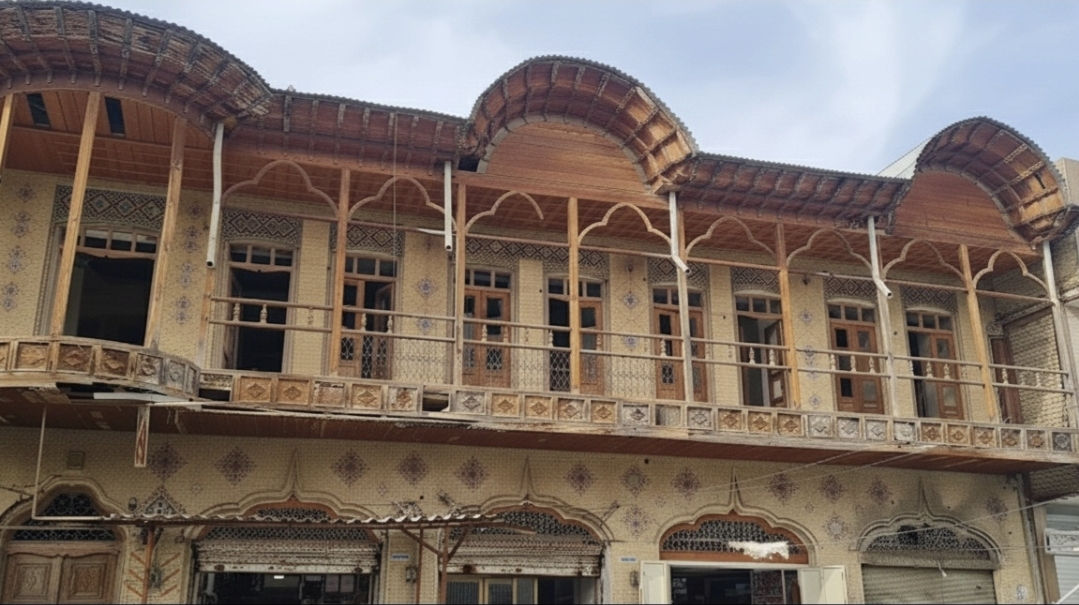
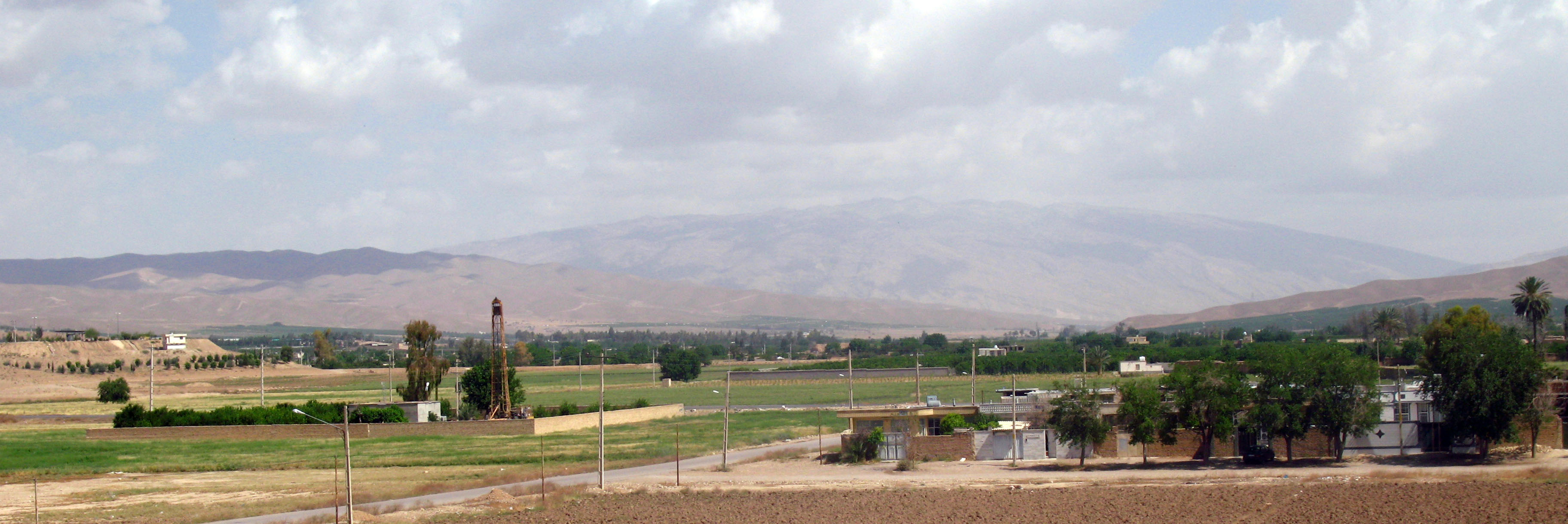
- Mianjangal Protected Area Ruins of the Maiden's Castle Local palm grove Shrine of Prince Qaseem Shrine of Imamzade Esmail City entrance Promenade of the Ruined Firetemple Municipality Observatory Fasa House building Mount Kharman in the distance
- Etymology: Possibly from Old Persian *pa-sāya ("encampment")
- Location within Iran
- Coordinates: 28°57′01″N 53°37′38″E
- Country: Iran
- Province: Fars
- County: Fasa
- District: Central

Area
  - City: 25.5 km^{2} (9.8 sq mi)
  - Rank: 3rd
- Elevation: 1,150 m (3,770 ft)

Population (2016)
  - Density: 4,346/km^{2} (11,260/sq mi)
  - Urban: 110,825
  - Population Rank: 4th
- Demonym: Fasa'i
- Time zone: UTC+3:30 (IRST)
- Website: shfasa.ir

Fasa (Persian: فسا) (Note: Also romanized as Fasā and Fassa) is a city in the Central District of Fasa County, Fars province, Iran, serving as capital of both the county and the district. The city's population in 2016 was 110,825. Fasa is the fourth most populous city of the province, and dates back to the Achaemenid period.

Fasa's economy is based on agriculture and Pastoralism. Jahrom, Darab, Sarvestan, Kherameh and Estahban are neighbours of Fasa. This city is located on the road from Shiraz to Kerman, This has made Fasa a strategic and important city.

== Etymology ==
The name Fasa is derived from the older form Pasā. Various etymologies for this name have been proposed. Local tradition holds that Fasa is named after a legendary prince named Pasa, son of Fars and grandson of Tahmuras. In Ibn al-Balkhi's retelling the legend, Fars granted the town of Fasa to Pasa; in Hamdallah Mustawfi's version, Pasa founds the city himself (in this version, he is directly the son of Tahmuras).

Harold Bailey proposed on linguistic grounds that the name is ultimately derived from Old Persian *pa-sāya, meaning "campground". This name would have referred to what was originally a Persian nomadic encampment that later evolved into a town (presumably Tall-e Zahhak, 3km south of present-day Fasa). It would have then come to refer more generally to the entire surrounding plain – i.e. the Fasa plain. The Persepolis Administrative Archives (tablets 49 and 53) mention a place in Fars called (in Elamite) ba-a-ši-ya-an, which George Glenn Cameron had already identified with Fasa; Bailey argued that this is an Elamite rendering of the Persian name *Pasāya.

This identification is not entirely uncontested – for example, Jan Tavernier reconstructs this form as Old Persian *Paišiyā-, literally meaning "before" and being a shortened form of a longer name. Tavernier instead prefers the form *Fasāta, reconstructed from Elamite Pa-iš-šá-taš, as the ancient name of Fasa. Researchers have also considered the meaning of the word Fasa "the city of the Persians". Much earlier, the 13th century writer Yaqut al-Hamawi also suggested that the name meant "the north wind".

Whatever its original meaning was, the name of Fasa later became Pasā in Middle Persian. At some point the ancient site at Tall-e Zahhak was abandoned and the name was transferred to the modern site. Finally, after the Muslim conquest of Persia, since Arabic doesn't have the sound "P", Arabic authors wrote the name as Fasā or Basā. Eventually, the Arabized form Fasā supplanted the old name Pasā locally as well.

The adjective (aka nesba or demonym) associated with Fasa today is Fasā'ī. An older form is Fasāwī, which was used by some medieval writers such as Ibn al-Sam'ani. Within Fars, a completely different demonym was used: according to Ibn al-Sam'ani and Hamza Esfahani (as quoted by Yaqut), the locals said Basāsīrī instead of Fasa'i. This shares an origin with the Persian terms garm-sīr ("hot region") and sard-sīr ("cold region"), so that in effect basāsīrī meant "the Fasa region". Hamza Esfahani also mentioned a place near Na'in called Kasnā, which used the similarly derived adjective kasnāsīrī. A prominent bearer of this nesba was Abu'l-Harith Arslan Basasiri, an 11th-century Turkic mercenary leader who led a rebellion against the caliph al-Qa'im.

== History ==
The origins of Fasa go back to at least the Achaemenid period and probably earlier. Several prehistoric mounds, such as Tall-e Siah, indicate early human activity in the Fasa region; they mostly are from the Eneolithic period. One of these sites is Tall-e Zahhak, a 660x750 m-wide tell 3 km southeast of present-day Fasa. Tall-e Zahhak represents the old site of Fasa itself (called Thaspis by Ptolemy) with many archaeological strata spanning a time between the 3rd millennium BCE and the 13th century CE. At some point, the old site at Tall-e Zahhak became abandoned, and the name "Fasa" migrated to the new location that is inhabited today. If the linguistic derivation of the name from Old Persian meaning "encampment" is correct, then Fasa probably began as a nomadic encampment that later developed into a permanent settlement.

There are two prehistoric archaeological sequences at Tall-e Zahhak: the older Khayrabad ware and the more recent Zahhak ware. Both are similar to different types of the Kaftari ware of central Fars and may date from the same period, which is tentatively estimated to be 2000-1800 BCE. There is then a gap until the Achaemenid period, when "finely-burnished red ware showing characteristic everted rims" appear in the archaeological record. There is a large mud-brick platform, which probably also dates from Achaemenid times given its resemblance to similar platforms at Persepolis and Pasargadae. Another characteristically Achaemenid feature found at Tall-e Zahhak is a large fluted column base similar to the ones found at Persepolis. This column base may indicate that Achaemenid Fasa was the site of a royal palace or administrative center. In any case, Fasa was an important fortified settlement during this period. There is also evidence of occupation during Hellenistic times.

Fasa came under Muslim control peacefully in 644 (23 AH), when the Arab general Uthman ibn Abi al-As reached an agreement with the herbad of Fasa and Darabgerd. According to Ibn al-Balkhi, the herbad offered a payment of two million dirhams in return for amān (protection from harm), and promised that the locals would continue to pay the jizya tax to the Muslims. Another force was sent to Fars under Abdallah ibn Amir in 650 (29 AH).

In the 10th century, Estakhri described Fasa as the largest town in the kūra (province) of Darabgerd – it was almost as large as Shiraz, which was then the capital of Fars. Its buildings, he wrote, were "more spacious" than the ones in Shiraz, and they were made of cypress wood and mud. It had wide streets, a citadel, a moat, and a rabaz or market quarter outside the walls. Fasa was an affluent town, and its residents lived in relative comfort because their commercial activity brought in plenty of wealth. Fasa's agricultural districts produced both cold and warm weather fruits. The main religion was Sunni Islam, of the same madhhab as Baghdad.

Estakhri listed some of the items sold at Fasa's markets: silks, including so-called washy silks that were multicolored and sometimes brocaded; "good delicate costumes"; besāṭs (i.e. tablecloths and rugs); fine setrs (i.e. curtains and bedsheets); fūṭas (i.e. napkins and towels); fine carpets; tablecloths; khargāhs (i.e. fine tents); mandīls (i.e. handkerchiefs and turban-like headgear); and safflower. Moqaddasi wrote in 985 that Fasa was home to "the most righteous, pleasant, and liberal people of Fars" and noted that its marketplace was all built out of wood. He described its congregational mosque as being larger than the one in Shiraz; it was built from brick and featured two courtyards connected by a roofed passage like the one in Baghdad. The anonymous author of the Hudud al-'Alam in 982 also described Fasa as a large and prosperous town that was a center of commerce.

Fasa was devastated in 989/90 (379 AH) during a bloody Buyid civil war between Turkish mercenaries formerly employed by Sharaf al-Dawla, who had recently died, and Daylamite troops loyal to Samsam al-Dawla. Fasa had been a base of the Daylamites under Samsam al-Dawla, and the Turks, commanded by Sharaf al-Dawla's son Abu Ali, sacked Fasa and killed all the Daylamites stationed there before returning west.

Later, in 1050 (442 AH), the future Seljuk sultan Alp Arslan led a clandestine raid on Fasa, which was still under Buyid control. His forces snuck up on Fasa through the desert, killed many of the inhabitants, looted three million dinars worth of valuables, and took 3,000 captives before returning to Merv in Khorasan.

Fasa is rarely mentioned in later documents, probably because it had declined significantly by then. In the first decade of the 1100s, Ibn al-Balkhi wrote, "although Fasa is as large as Isfahan, it is in complete disarray, and the largest part thereof in ruin. Shabankara [tribesmen] had destroyed it; the atabeg Čāvlī had it rebuilt." The perception that Fasa had previously been a great city but had now fallen into decay is supported by the fact that the latest pottery fragments found at Tall-e Zahhak date from the 12th and 13th centuries.

In 1762/3 (1176 AH), Karim Khan Zand sent forces to subdue the Bakhtiari tribe in the mountains near Isfahan. Two branches, the Haft Lang and Chahar Lang, were forced to migrate; the Haft Lang were resettled near Qom and the Chahar Lang were resettled near Fasa. "As a gesture of goodwill", Karim Khan had agricultural lands provided for the Bakhtiaris. This event "might have had serious socio-economic and cultural consequences for Fasa". Later, Zayn al-Abedin Shirvani wrote that Fasa was "a pleasant townlet... Most of its inhabitants are Tajik... all of them are Shi'ite and not devoid of mardomī (civility)...Now it includes nearly two thousand houses, and its countryside nearly thirty hamlets and cultivated fields."

Urban Foundations of Fasa (Grand Mosque, Bazaar, Bath, etc.) was established during the Safavid period and expanded during the Afsharids. Epidemics, famines, political games, insecurity and looting were among the most important factors in the destruction and decline of Fasa's prosperity during the Qajar period.

== Demographics ==
=== Language, ethnicity, and religion ===
The predominant language of the people of Fasa is Persian with the Eastern Fars dialect (a dialect between Shirazi and Kermani), and because various tribes have inhabited this land in the past, There is also a significant Khamseh Arab minority in Fasa. Almost all of the people are Muslims.

=== Population ===
At the time of the 2006 National Census, the city's population was 90,251 in 22,097 households. The following census in 2011 counted 104,809 people in 28,862 households. The 2016 census measured the population of the city as 110,825 people in 33,379 households.

Historical population
| Year | Pop. | ±% |
|---|---|---|
| 1976 | 31,489 | — |
| 1986 | 64,771 | +105.7% |
| 1991 | 74,478 | +15.0% |
| 1996 | 81,706 | +9.7% |
| 2006 | 90,251 | +10.5% |
| 2011 | 104,809 | +16.1% |
| 2016 | 110,825 | +5.7% |

== Climate ==
Fasa has a hot semi-arid climate (Köppen climate classification: BSh). Its average annual precipitation is about 290 millimetres (11 in).

Climate data for Fasa (1991–2020)
| Month | Jan | Feb | Mar | Apr | May | Jun | Jul | Aug | Sep | Oct | Nov | Dec | Year |
|---|---|---|---|---|---|---|---|---|---|---|---|---|---|
| Record high °C (°F) | 25.4 (77.7) | 27.0 (80.6) | 31.8 (89.2) | 39.0 (102.2) | 41.0 (105.8) | 45.0 (113.0) | 45.0 (113.0) | 43.6 (110.5) | 41.0 (105.8) | 39.0 (102.2) | 30.0 (86.0) | 28.0 (82.4) | 45.0 (113.0) |
| Mean daily maximum °C (°F) | 14.7 (58.5) | 17.2 (63.0) | 21.0 (69.8) | 27.0 (80.6) | 33.8 (92.8) | 38.7 (101.7) | 40.1 (104.2) | 39.1 (102.4) | 35.6 (96.1) | 30.1 (86.2) | 22.3 (72.1) | 17.4 (63.3) | 28.1 (82.6) |
| Daily mean °C (°F) | 7.4 (45.3) | 9.7 (49.5) | 13.1 (55.6) | 18.3 (64.9) | 24.8 (76.6) | 29.6 (85.3) | 31.7 (89.1) | 30.4 (86.7) | 26.2 (79.2) | 20.4 (68.7) | 13.4 (56.1) | 9.2 (48.6) | 19.5 (67.1) |
| Mean daily minimum °C (°F) | 1.4 (34.5) | 3.1 (37.6) | 5.7 (42.3) | 9.7 (49.5) | 14.8 (58.6) | 18.8 (65.8) | 21.9 (71.4) | 20.7 (69.3) | 16.3 (61.3) | 11.1 (52.0) | 5.7 (42.3) | 2.6 (36.7) | 11.0 (51.8) |
| Record low °C (°F) | −6.0 (21.2) | −5.6 (21.9) | −5.0 (23.0) | 0.0 (32.0) | 4.0 (39.2) | 10.6 (51.1) | 14.0 (57.2) | 11.0 (51.8) | 6.0 (42.8) | 2.0 (35.6) | −2.6 (27.3) | −7.0 (19.4) | −7.0 (19.4) |
| Average precipitation mm (inches) | 77.3 (3.04) | 59.5 (2.34) | 56.7 (2.23) | 17.8 (0.70) | 2.2 (0.09) | 0.3 (0.01) | 0.4 (0.02) | 1.9 (0.07) | 0.5 (0.02) | 1.0 (0.04) | 17.4 (0.69) | 49.7 (1.96) | 284.7 (11.21) |
| Average precipitation days (≥ 1 mm) | 5.7 | 4.3 | 4.9 | 2.5 | 0.4 | 0.1 | 0.1 | 0.5 | 0.1 | 0.3 | 2.3 | 3.4 | 24.6 |
| Average relative humidity (%) | 63 | 59 | 54 | 46 | 29 | 20 | 22 | 23 | 24 | 31 | 48 | 59 | 39.8 |
| Average dew point °C (°F) | −0.3 (31.5) | 0.7 (33.3) | 2.2 (36.0) | 4.6 (40.3) | 3.5 (38.3) | 3.1 (37.6) | 6.2 (43.2) | 5.2 (41.4) | 2.7 (36.9) | 1.3 (34.3) | 0.8 (33.4) | 0.1 (32.2) | 2.5 (36.5) |
| Mean monthly sunshine hours | 227 | 219 | 249 | 266 | 330 | 349 | 336 | 335 | 312 | 305 | 246 | 236 | 3,410 |
Source 1: NOAA NCEI
Source 2: IRIMO, Fars province Meteorological Organization

Climate data for Fasa (1966–2010)
| Month | Jan | Feb | Mar | Apr | May | Jun | Jul | Aug | Sep | Oct | Nov | Dec | Year |
|---|---|---|---|---|---|---|---|---|---|---|---|---|---|
| Record high °C (°F) | 24.0 (75.2) | 27.0 (80.6) | 31.0 (87.8) | 39.0 (102.2) | 40.0 (104.0) | 45.0 (113.0) | 45.0 (113.0) | 43.6 (110.5) | 41.0 (105.8) | 39.0 (102.2) | 30.0 (86.0) | 28.0 (82.4) | 42 (108) |
| Mean daily maximum °C (°F) | 14.3 (57.7) | 16.8 (62.2) | 20.8 (69.4) | 26.7 (80.1) | 33.5 (92.3) | 38.3 (100.9) | 39.7 (103.5) | 38.7 (101.7) | 35.3 (95.5) | 29.8 (85.6) | 22.7 (72.9) | 16.7 (62.1) | 27.8 (82.0) |
| Daily mean °C (°F) | 7.7 (45.9) | 9.6 (49.3) | 13.2 (55.8) | 18.2 (64.8) | 24.3 (75.7) | 28.7 (83.7) | 30.6 (87.1) | 29.6 (85.3) | 25.8 (78.4) | 20.3 (68.5) | 14.1 (57.4) | 9.6 (49.3) | 19.3 (66.8) |
| Mean daily minimum °C (°F) | 1.1 (34.0) | 2.5 (36.5) | 5.6 (42.1) | 9.7 (49.5) | 15.1 (59.2) | 19.0 (66.2) | 21.6 (70.9) | 20.6 (69.1) | 16.2 (61.2) | 10.9 (51.6) | 5.6 (42.1) | 2.5 (36.5) | 10.9 (51.6) |
| Record low °C (°F) | −6.0 (21.2) | −5.6 (21.9) | −5.0 (23.0) | 0.0 (32.0) | 4.0 (39.2) | 10.6 (51.1) | 14.0 (57.2) | 11.0 (51.8) | 6.0 (42.8) | 2.0 (35.6) | −2.6 (27.3) | −7.0 (19.4) | −7.0 (19.4) |
| Average precipitation mm (inches) | 82.3 (3.24) | 50.9 (2.00) | 52.4 (2.06) | 18.5 (0.73) | 2.1 (0.08) | 0.3 (0.01) | 1.5 (0.06) | 1.4 (0.06) | 0.3 (0.01) | 1.5 (0.06) | 13.1 (0.52) | 65.6 (2.58) | 289.9 (11.41) |
| Average relative humidity (%) | 63 | 57 | 53 | 44 | 29 | 21 | 23 | 25 | 25 | 31 | 43 | 58 | 39 |
| Average dew point °C (°F) | 0.0 (32.0) | 0.7 (33.3) | 2.7 (36.9) | 4.5 (40.1) | 4.4 (39.9) | 4.1 (39.4) | 6.7 (44.1) | 6.8 (44.2) | 3.6 (38.5) | 1.6 (34.9) | 0.4 (32.7) | 0.4 (32.7) | 3.0 (37.4) |
| Mean monthly sunshine hours | 224.5 | 221.2 | 244.9 | 262.4 | 330.9 | 351.4 | 333.8 | 325.5 | 311.4 | 301.7 | 249.3 | 224.3 | 3,381.3 |
Source: IRIMO Fars province Meteorological Organization

== Economy ==
Fasa is thriving in terms of agriculture, and is known as the city of wheat. Due to the favorable climate, palms, walnut trees, and citrus such as oranges, tangerines, pomegranates, pistachios, almonds, and walnuts are common in this city. Cotton cultivation has also flourished in Fasa.

Pastoralism is the second base of Fasa's economy. A variety of livestock and dairy products, wool, leather, meat, are the products of the city.

There is also an under construction petrochemical project in the city. The construction stated in 2012 and after the complete operation, It will produce Low density polyethylenes.

=== Souvenirs ===
The "Fasaei bread" (Persian: نان فسایی) is the most significant and the main souvenir of Fasa city. Kilim, Gabbeh, Jajim, Lemon, Orange, Tangerine, Pomegranate, Walnut, Pistachio and handicrafts are other souvenirs of this city.

== Education ==
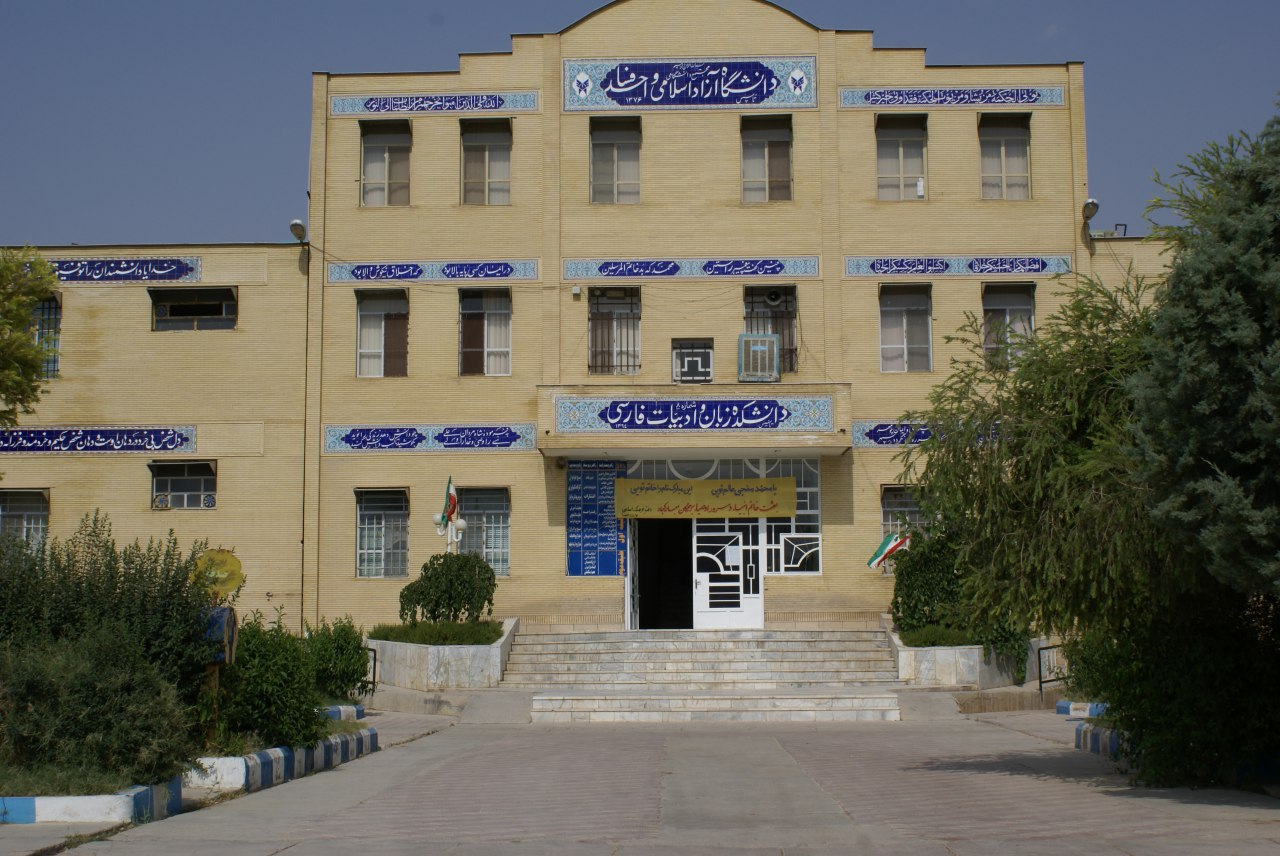
Islamic Azad University of Fasa

=== Colleges and universities ===
- Fasa University
- Fasa University of Medical Sciences
- Fasa Payam Noor University
- Islamic Azad University of Fasa
- Technical and Agricultural college of Fasa

== Healthcare ==
Fasa has two hospitals in operation and one hospital under construction.

- Valie Asr Hospital
- Dr. Shariati Hospital
- Emam Hossein Hospital (under construction)

=== Clinics ===
- Valie Asr Clinic
- Hamzeh Clinic
- Yasaei Clinic

== Transport ==
=== Roads ===
Shiraz-Fasa highway, The highway which connects Fasa to Shiraz is in operation. Fasa-Darab and Fasa-Estahban-Neyriz highway projects are also under construction.

=== Railway ===
Currently, the Shiraz-Golgohar railway is passing through Fasa with the aim of connecting Shiraz to the Golgohar mines and Kerman province. The length of this route is 346 kilometres (215 mi), which is under construction in 4 phases and connects Shiraz to Golgohar through Sarvestan, Fasa, Estahban and Neyriz.

=== Airport ===
Fasa Airport is an airport near Fasa. The airport is currently inactive, but studies of the airport's development plan, improving and increasing the length of the runway with the aim of resuming commercial flights are being done. The airport has a 1,982 metres (6,503 ft) runway.

== Attractions and monuments ==
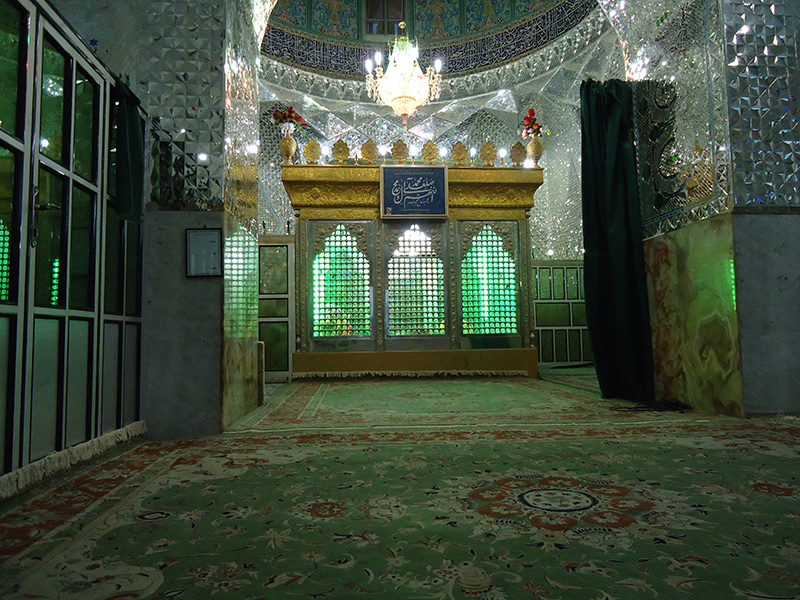
Imamzadeh Qasem

- Tale Zahak
- Ashpaz Khaneh Zahhak Castle
- Tale Nalaki
- Imamzadeh Hasan
- Imamzadeh Qasem
- Imamzadeh Ismael
- Mianjangal Jungle
- Kharmankooh mountain
- Sassanid fire temple
- The Naghare-khane building

== See also ==
Media related to Fasa at Wikimedia Commons

Fasa travel guide from Wikivoyage
