= Harom =

Harom هارم
- Village
- Location within Iran
- Coordinates: 28°54′19″N 53°42′53″E
- Country: Iran
- Province: Fars
- County: Fasa
- Bakhsh: Central
- Rural District: Kushk-e Qazi

Population (2006)
  - Total: 516
- Time zone: UTC+3:30 (IRST)
  - Summer (DST): UTC+4:30 (IRDT)

Harom (Persian: هارم, also Romanized as Hārom) is a village in Kushk-e Qazi Rural District, in the Central District of Fasa County, Fars province, Iran. At the 2006 census, its population was 516, in 122 families.
