= Kargah-e Mahal Ahdas Shahrak ol Zahra =

Kargah-e Mahal Ahdas Shahrak ol Zahra كارگاه محل احداث شهرك الزهرا
- Village
- Country: Iran
- Province: Fars
- County: Fasa
- Bakhsh: Central
- Rural District: Kushk-e Qazi

Population (2006)
  - Total: 162
- Time zone: UTC+3:30 (IRST)
  - Summer (DST): UTC+4:30 (IRDT)

Kargah-e Mahal Ahdas Shahrak ol Zahra (Persian: كارگاه محل احداث شهرك الزهرا, also Romanized as Kārgāh-e Maḩal Āḩdās̄ Shahrak ol Zahrā) is a village in Kushk-e Qazi Rural District, in the Central District of Fasa County, Fars province, Iran. At the 2006 census, its population was 162, in 36 families.
