= Najafabad, Fasa =

Najafabad نجف اباد
- Village
- Country: Iran
- Province: Fars
- County: Fasa
- Bakhsh: Central
- Rural District: Sahrarud

Population (2006)
  - Total: 42
- Time zone: UTC+3:30 (IRST)
  - Summer (DST): UTC+4:30 (IRDT)

Najafabad (Persian: نجف اباد, also Romanized as Najafābād) is a village in Sahrarud Rural District, in the Central District of Fasa County, Fars province, Iran. At the 2006 census, its population was 42, in 10 families.
