= Dastejeh =

Dastejeh دستجه
- Village
- Location within Iran
- Coordinates: 28°53′32″N 53°40′22″E
- Country: Iran
- Province: Fars
- County: Fasa
- Bakhsh: Central
- Rural District: Sahrarud

Population (2006)
  - Total: 3,447
- Time zone: UTC+3:30 (IRST)
  - Summer (DST): UTC+4:30 (IRDT)

Dastejeh (Persian: دستجه, also Romanized as Dastjeh; also known as Dasteḩeh and Deh Dashteh) is a village in Sahrarud Rural District, in the Central District of Fasa County, Fars province, Iran. At the 2006 census, its population was 3,447, in 866 families.
