= Tang-e Karam =

Tang-e Karam تنگ كرم
- Village
- Location within Iran
- Coordinates: 29°06′37″N 53°38′51″E
- Country: Iran
- Province: Fars
- County: Fasa
- Bakhsh: Central
- Rural District: Kushk-e Qazi

Population (2006)
  - Total: 2,052
- Time zone: UTC+3:30 (IRST)
  - Summer (DST): UTC+4:30 (IRDT)

Tang-e Karam (Persian: تنگ كرم, also Romanized as Tang-i-Karam) is a village in Kushk-e Qazi Rural District, in the Central District of Fasa County, Fars province, Iran. At the 2006 census, its population was 2,052, in 495 families.
