= Kahnekuyeh =

Kahnekuyeh كهنكویه
- Village
- Location within Iran
- Coordinates: 28°57′11″N 53°40′33″E
- Country: Iran
- Province: Fars
- County: Fasa
- Bakhsh: Central
- Rural District: Kushk-e Qazi

Population (2006)
  - Total: 305
- Time zone: UTC+3:30 (IRST)
  - Summer (DST): UTC+4:30 (IRDT)

Kahnekuyeh (Persian: كهنكویه, also Romanized as Kahnekūyeh, Kohan Kūyeh, and Kahnakūyeh; also known as Kahnakūyek) is a village in Kushk-e Qazi Rural District, in the Central District of Fasa County, Fars province, Iran. At the 2006 census, its population was 305, in 77 families.
