= Panal =

Panal پانعل
- Village
- Location within Iran
- Coordinates: 29°04′03″N 53°29′04″E
- Country: Iran
- Province: Fars
- County: Fasa
- Bakhsh: Central
- Rural District: Jangal

Population (2006)
  - Total: 89
- Time zone: UTC+3:30 (IRST)
  - Summer (DST): UTC+4:30 (IRDT)

Panal (Persian: پانعل, also Romanized as 'Pāna‘l; also known as Pā Na‘l Jangal) is a village in Jangal Rural District, in the Central District of Fasa County, Fars province, Iran. At the 2006 census, its population was 89, in 19 families.
