= Vocational Training Centre, Fars =

Vocational Training Centre, Fars مركزاموزش فني حرفه ائ
- Village/training centre
- Country: Iran
- Province: Fars
- County: Fasa
- Bakhsh: Central
- Rural District: Kushk-e Qazi

Population (2006)
  - Total: 11
- Time zone: UTC+3:30 (IRST)
  - Summer (DST): UTC+4:30 (IRDT)

Vocational Training Centre, Fars (Persian: مركزاموزش فني حرفه ائ – Markaz Āmūzesh Fanī Ḩarefehā') is a village and training centre in Kushk-e Qazi Rural District, in the Central District of Fasa County, Fars province, Iran. At the 2006 census, its population was 11, in 4 families.
