= Soghad, Fasa =

Soghad صغاد
- Village
- Location within Iran
- Coordinates: 28°54′46″N 53°37′51″E
- Country: Iran
- Province: Fars
- County: Fasa
- Bakhsh: Central
- Rural District: Sahrarud

Population (2006)
  - Total: 93
- Time zone: UTC+3:30 (IRST)
  - Summer (DST): UTC+4:30 (IRDT)

Soghad (Persian: صغاد, also Romanized as Şoghād; also known as Şoqād, and Soqad) is a village in Sahrarud Rural District, in the Central District of Fasa County, Fars province, Iran. At the 2006 census, its population was 93, in 24 families.
