= Emamzadeh Shah Esmail =

Emamzadeh Shah Esmail امام زاده شاه اسماعيل
- Village
- Country: Iran
- Province: Fars
- County: Fasa
- Bakhsh: Central
- Rural District: Jangal

Population (2006)
  - Total: 13
- Time zone: UTC+3:30 (IRST)
  - Summer (DST): UTC+4:30 (IRDT)

Emamzadeh Shah Esmail (Persian: امام زاده شاه اسماعيل, also Romanized as Emāmzādeh Shāh Esmā‘īl) is a village in Jangal Rural District, in the Central District of Fasa County, Fars province, Iran. At the 2006 census, its population was 13, in 5 families.
