= Baramshad =

Baramshad برمشاد
- Village
- Location within Iran
- Coordinates: 29°00′32″N 53°43′11″E
- Country: Iran
- Province: Fars
- County: Fasa
- Bakhsh: Central
- Rural District: Kushk-e Qazi

Population (2006)
  - Total: 45
- Time zone: UTC+3:30 (IRST)
  - Summer (DST): UTC+4:30 (IRDT)

Baramshad (Persian: برمشاد, also Romanized as Baramshād) is a village in Kushk-e Qazi Rural District, in the Central District of Fasa County, Fars province, Iran. At the 2006 census, its population was 45, in 9 families.
