= Lehqorbani =

Lehqorbani (Persian: له قرباني) may refer to:

- Lehqorbani-ye Olya
- Lehqorbani-ye Sofla
