= Seh Konj =

Seh Konj سه كنج
- Village
- Location within Iran
- Coordinates: 28°48′26″N 53°37′58″E
- Country: Iran
- Province: Fars
- County: Fasa
- Bakhsh: Central
- Rural District: Sahrarud

Population (2006)
  - Total: 18
- Time zone: UTC+3:30 (IRST)
  - Summer (DST): UTC+4:30 (IRDT)

Seh Konj (Persian: سه كنج, also Romanized as Sehkonj) is a village in Sahrarud Rural District, in the Central District of Fasa County, Fars province, Iran. At the 2006 census, its population was 18, in 4 families.
