= Dasht-e Ahmad =

Dasht-e Ahmad دشت احمد
- Village
- Location within Iran
- Coordinates: 28°55′32″N 53°40′32″E
- Country: Iran
- Province: Fars
- County: Fasa
- Bakhsh: Central
- Rural District: Kushk-e Qazi

Population (2006)
  - Total: 149
- Time zone: UTC+3:30 (IRST)
  - Summer (DST): UTC+4:30 (IRDT)

Dasht-e Ahmad (Persian: دشت احمد, also Romanized as Dasht-e Aḩmad) is a village in Kushk-e Qazi Rural District, in the Central District of Fasa County, Fars province, Iran. At the 2006 census, its population was 149, in 34 families.
