= Gowd-e Kalur =

Gowd-e Kalur گودكلور
- Village
- Location within Iran
- Coordinates: 29°09′28″N 53°25′16″E
- Country: Iran
- Province: Fars
- County: Fasa
- Bakhsh: Central
- Rural District: Jangal

Population (2006)
  - Total: 29
- Time zone: UTC+3:30 (IRST)
  - Summer (DST): UTC+4:30 (IRDT)

Gowd-e Kalur (Persian: گودكلور, also Romanized as Gowd-e Kalūr) is a village in Jangal Rural District, in the Central District of Fasa County, Fars province, Iran. At the 2006 census, its population was 29, in 7 families.
