= Shah Abu ol Fath =

Shah Abu ol Fath شاه ابوالقاسم فتح
- Village
- Location within Iran
- Coordinates: 28°54′18″N 53°38′52″E
- Country: Iran
- Province: Fars
- County: Fasa
- Bakhsh: Central
- Rural District: Sahrarud

Population (2006)
  - Total: 43
- Time zone: UTC+3:30 (IRST)
  - Summer (DST): UTC+4:30 (IRDT)

Shah Abu ol Fath (Persian شاه ابوالقاسم فتح also Romanized as Shāh Abū ol Fatḩ; also known as Shāhabolfatḩ) is a village in Sahrarud Rural District, in the Central District of Fasa County, Fars province, Iran. At the 2006 census, its population was 43, in 9 families.
