= Boneh Raz =

Boneh Raz بنه رز
- Village
- Country: Iran
- Province: Fars
- County: Fasa
- Bakhsh: Central
- Rural District: Kushk-e Qazi

Population (2006)
  - Total: 13
- Time zone: UTC+3:30 (IRST)
  - Summer (DST): UTC+4:30 (IRDT)

Boneh Raz (Persian: بنه رز) is a village in Kushk-e Qazi Rural District, in the Central District of Fasa County, Fars province, Iran. At the 2006 census, its population was 13, in 4 families.
