= Barah Ruz =

Barah Ruz بره روز
- Village
- Location within Iran
- Coordinates: 29°05′01″N 53°28′52″E
- Country: Iran
- Province: Fars
- County: Fasa
- Bakhsh: Central
- Rural District: Jangal

Population (2006)
  - Total: 41
- Time zone: UTC+3:30 (IRST)
  - Summer (DST): UTC+4:30 (IRDT)

Barah Ruz (Persian: بره روز, also Romanized as Barah Rūz; also known as Barārūz) is a village in Jangal Rural District, in the Central District of Fasa County, Fars province, Iran. At the 2006 census, its population was 41, in 9 families.
