= Tol-e Zireh =

Tol-e Zireh تل زيره
- Village
- Location within Iran
- Coordinates: 29°07′59″N 53°25′15″E
- Country: Iran
- Province: Fars
- County: Fasa
- Bakhsh: Central
- Rural District: Jangal

Population (2006)
  - Total: 70
- Time zone: UTC+3:30 (IRST)
  - Summer (DST): UTC+4:30 (IRDT)

Tol-e Zireh (Persian: تل زيره, also Romanized as Tol-e Zīreh) is a village in Jangal Rural District, in the Central District of Fasa County, Fars province, Iran. At the 2006 census, its population was 70, in 19 families.
