= Lehqorbani-ye Sofla =

Lehqorbani-ye Sofla له قرباني سفلي
- Village
- Location within Iran
- Coordinates: 29°14′00″N 53°29′15″E
- Country: Iran
- Province: Fars
- County: Fasa
- Bakhsh: Central
- Rural District: Jangal

Population (2006)
  - Total: 182
- Time zone: UTC+3:30 (IRST)
  - Summer (DST): UTC+4:30 (IRDT)

Lehqorbani-ye Sofla (Persian: له قرباني سفلي, also Romanized as Lehqorbānī-ye Soflá) is a village in Jangal Rural District, in the Central District of Fasa County, Fars province, Iran. At the 2006 census, its population was 182, in 48 families.
