= Moqaberi =

Village in Fars province, Iran

Moqaberi Persian: مقابري
- Village
- Location within Iran
- Coordinates: 29°08′00″N 53°29′17″E
- Country: Iran
- Province: Fars
- County: Fasa
- District: Central
- Rural District: Jangal

Population (2016)
  - Total: 120
- Time zone: UTC+3:30 (IRST)

Moqaberi (Persian: مقابري) (Note: Also romanized as Maqāberī and Moqāberī; also known as Moqāyerī) is a village in, and the capital of, Jangal Rural District of the Central District of Fasa County, Fars province, Iran.

== Demographics ==
=== Population ===
At the time of the 2006 National Census, the village's population was 85 in 19 households. The following census in 2011 counted 61 people in 18 households. The 2016 census measured the population of the village as 120 people in 39 households.
