= Ab Asemani =

Ab Asemani اب اسماني
- Village
- Location within Iran
- Coordinates: 29°06′32″N 53°26′12″E
- Country: Iran
- Province: Fars
- County: Fasa
- Bakhsh: Central
- Rural District: Jangal

Population (2006)
  - Total: 167
- Time zone: UTC+3:30 (IRST)
  - Summer (DST): UTC+4:30 (IRDT)

Ab Asemani (Persian: اب اسماني, also Romanized as Āb Āsemānī) is a village in Jangal Rural District, in the Central District of Fasa County, Fars province, Iran. At the 2006 census, its population was 167, in 37 families.
