= Mahmudabad-e Sofla, Fars =

Village in Fars province, Iran

Mahmudabad-e Sofla Persian: محموداباد سفلي
- Village
- Location within Iran
- Coordinates: 29°06′56″N 53°30′20″E
- Country: Iran
- Province: Fars
- County: Fasa
- District: Central
- Rural District: Jangal

Population (2016)
  - Total: 725
- Time zone: UTC+3:30 (IRST)

Mahmudabad-e Sofla (Persian: محمودابادسفلي) (Note: Also romanized as Maḩmūdābād-e Soflá) is a village in Jangal Rural District of the Central District of Fasa County, Fars province, Iran.

== Demographics ==
=== Population ===
At the time of the 2006 National Census, the village's population was 485 in 105 households. The following census in 2011 counted 575 people in 136 households. The 2016 census measured the population of the village as 725 people in 187 households. It was the most populous village in its rural district.
