= Asemani =

Asemani (Persian: آسمانی) is a surname. Notable people with the surname include:

- Mehrdad Asemani, Iranian singer and composer
- Raheleh Asemani, Belgian taekwondo athlete

== See also ==
- Ab Asemani, a village in Fars Province, Iran
