= Lehqorbani-ye Olya =

Lehqorbani-ye Olya له قرباني عليا
- Village
- Location within Iran
- Coordinates: 29°14′42″N 53°28′34″E
- Country: Iran
- Province: Fars
- County: Fasa
- Bakhsh: Central
- Rural District: Jangal

Population (2006)
  - Total: 82
- Time zone: UTC+3:30 (IRST)
  - Summer (DST): UTC+4:30 (IRDT)

Lehqorbani-ye Olya (Persian: له قرباني عليا, also Romanized as Lehqorbānī-ye 'Olyā) is a village in Jangal Rural District, in the Central District of Fasa County, Fars province, Iran. At the 2006 census, its population was 82, in 20 families.
