= Sahrarud =

Village in Fars province, Iran

Sahrarud Persian: صحرارود
- Village
- Location within Iran
- Coordinates: 28°52′29″N 53°41′55″E
- Country: Iran
- Province: Fars
- County: Fasa
- District: Central
- Rural District: Sahrarud

Population (2016)
  - Total: 4,554
- Time zone: UTC+3:30 (IRST)

Sahrarud (Persian: صحرارود) (Note: Also romanized as Şaḩrā Rūd and Şaḩrārūd; also known as Şaḩrā) is a village in, and the capital of, Sahrarud Rural District of the Central District of Fasa County, Fars province, Iran.

== Demographics ==
=== Population ===
At the time of the 2006 National Census, the village's population was 4,860 in 1,163 households. The following census in 2011 counted 5,039 people in 1,386 households. The 2016 census measured the population of the village as 4,554 people in 1,352 households. It was the most populous village in its rural district.
