= Kushk-e Qazi =

Village in Fars province, Iran

Kushk-e Qazi Persian: كوشك قاضي
- Village
- Location within Iran
- Coordinates: 28°55′45″N 53°41′07″E
- Country: Iran
- Province: Fars
- County: Fasa
- District: Central
- Rural District: Kushk-e Qazi

Population (2016)
  - Total: 3,471
- Time zone: UTC+3:30 (IRST)

Kushk-e Qazi (Persian: كوشك قاضي) (Note: Also romanized as Kūshk-e Qāẕī, Kūshk-e Qāzī, and Kūshk-i-Qāzi; also known as Khoshk Qāzī and Kūsk-e Qāzī) is a village in, and the capital of, Kushk-e Qazi Rural District of the Central District of Fasa County, Fars province, Iran.

== Demographics ==
=== Population ===
At the time of the 2006 National Census, the village's population was 4,053 in 1,073 households. The following census in 2011 counted 3,834 people in 1,149 households. The 2016 census measured the population of the village as 3,471 people in 1,079 households. It was the most populous village in its rural district.
