= Fars-Nama =

Book on the history of Fars by Ibn al-Balkhi

- Author: "Ibn al-Balkhi"
- Original title: فارسنامه
- Language: Persian
- Subject: History and geography of Fars
- Publication place: Seljuk Sultanate (court of Muhammad Tapar)

Fārsnāma (Persian: فارسنامه, "The Book of Fars") is a local Persian-language history and geography of Fars province, Persia, written between 1105 and 1116 during the Seljuk period. It is attributed to the otherwise unknown Ibn al-Balkhi (ابن البلخی), a native of Fars who flourished in the 12th century. His ancestors were from Balkh in Khorasan, as his nisba suggests. The work was commissioned by Seljuk ruler Muhammad I Tapar (r. 1105–1118).

Roughly speaking, the first two-thirds of the book consists of information about the pre-Islamic Iranian rulers of Fars, as well as the Arab conquest of the province. The final third of the work consists of information on the province's geography.

The critical edition published by Reynold A. Nicholson and Guy Le Strange in 1921 is the standard edition of the Farsnama up to this day.
