= Ashpaz Khaneh Zahhak Castle =

Castle in Fars province, Iran

- قلعه آشپزخانه ضحاک
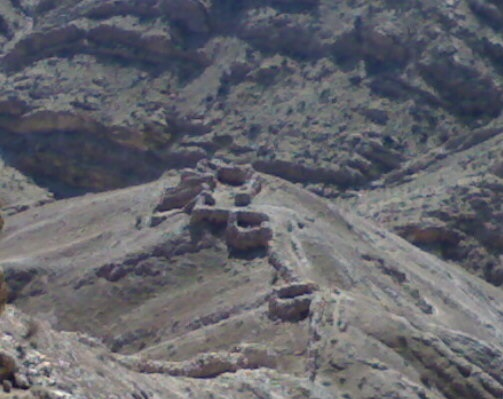

General information
- Type: Castle
- Location: Fasa County, Iran

Ashpaz Khaneh Zahhak Castle (Persian: قلعه آشپزخانه ضحاک) is a historical castle located in Fasa County in Fars province, The fortress dates back to the Parthian Empire and Sasanian Empire.
