= Sahrarud Rural District =

Rural district in Fars province, Iran

Sahrarud Rural District Persian: دهستان صحرارود
- Rural District
- Location within Iran
- Coordinates: 28°54′07″N 53°35′45″E
- Country: Iran
- Province: Fars
- County: Fasa
- District: Central
- Capital: Sahrarud

Population (2016)
  - Total: 8,872
- Time zone: UTC+3:30 (IRST)

Sahrarud Rural District (Persian: دهستان صحرارود) is in the Central District of Fasa County, Fars province, Iran. Its capital is the village of Sahrarud.

== Demographics ==
=== Population ===
At the time of the 2006 National Census, the rural district's population was 9,342 in 2,287 households. There were 9,644 inhabitants in 2,663 households at the following census of 2011. The 2016 census measured the population of the rural district as 8,872 in 2,632 households. The most populous of its 55 villages was Sahrarud, with 4,554 people.
