= Kushk-e Qazi Rural District =

Rural district in Fars province, Iran

Kushk-e Qazi Rural District Persian: دهستان كوشك قاضي
- Rural District
- Location within Iran
- Coordinates: 29°00′13″N 53°38′55″E
- Country: Iran
- Province: Fars
- County: Fasa
- District: Central
- Capital: Kushk-e Qazi

Population (2016)
  - Total: 11,793
- Time zone: UTC+3:30 (IRST)

Kushk-e Qazi Rural District (Persian: دهستان كوشك قاضي) is in the Central District of Fasa County, Fars province, Iran. Its capital is the village of Kushk-e Qazi.

== Demographics ==
=== Population ===
At the time of the 2006 National Census, the rural district's population was 12,129 in 3,040 households. There were 12,345 inhabitants in 3,353 households at the following census of 2011. The 2016 census measured the population of the rural district as 11,793 in 3,338 households. The most populous of its 69 villages was Kushk-e Qazi, with 3,471 people.
