= Jangal Rural District (Fasa County) =

Rural district in Fars province, Iran

Jangal Rural District Persian: دهستان جنگل
- Rural District
- Location within Iran
- Coordinates: 29°13′41″N 53°30′47″E
- Country: Iran
- Province: Fars
- County: Fasa
- District: Central
- Capital: Moqaberi

Population (2016)
  - Total: 5,535
- Time zone: UTC+3:30 (IRST)

Jangal Rural District (Persian: دهستان جنگل) is in the Central District of Fasa County, Fars province, Iran. Its capital is the village of Moqaberi.

== Demographics ==
=== Population ===
At the time of the 2006 National Census, the rural district's population was 4,694 in 1,158 households. There were 5,451 inhabitants in 1,462 households at the following census of 2011. The 2016 census measured the population of the rural district as 5,535 in 1,641 households. The most populous of its 81 villages was Mahmudabad-e Sofla, with 725 people.
