= Central District (Fasa County) =

District in Fars province, Iran

Central District (Fasa County) Persian: بخش مرکزی شهرستان فسا
- District
- Location within Iran
- Coordinates: 29°06′28″N 53°35′27″E
- Country: Iran
- Province: Fars
- County: Fasa
- Capital: Fasa

Population (2016)
  - Total: 137,025
- Time zone: UTC+3:30 (IRST)

The Central District of Fasa County (Persian: بخش مرکزی شهرستان فسا) is in Fars province, Iran. Its capital is the city of Fasa.

== Demographics ==
=== Population ===
At the time of the 2006 National Census, the district's population was 116,416 in 28,582 households. The following census in 2011 counted 132,249 people in 36,340 households. The 2016 census measured the population of the district as 137,025 inhabitants in 40,990 households.

=== Administrative divisions ===
Central District (Fasa County) Population
| Administrative Divisions | 2006 | 2011 | 2016 |
|---|---|---|---|
| Jangal RD | 4,694 | 5,451 | 5,535 |
| Kushk-e Qazi RD | 12,129 | 12,345 | 11,793 |
| Sahrarud RD | 9,342 | 9,644 | 8,872 |
| Fasa (city) | 90,251 | 104,809 | 110,825 |
| Total | 116,416 | 132,249 | 137,025 |
RD = Rural District
