= List of roads and highways in Iran =

These are the list of routes in Iran.

Freeway marker

Expressway marker

Road marker

== First Level Roads ==
Symbol	Number of road	Distance (km)	From	To	Major Cities	Provinces	Itinerary	Image
	Road 11	325	Jolfa	Baneh	Khoy, Salamas, Urmia, Mahabad, Sardasht	East Azerbaijan, West Azerbaijan, Kurdistan		
	Road 12	572	Bazargan	Bilehsavar	Poldasht, Jolfa, Parsabad	Ardabil, East Azerbaijan, West Azerbaijan		
	Road 14	460	Razi	Salamas	Meshkin Shahr, Ahar, Tabriz, Shabestar	Ardabil, East Azerbaijan, West Azerbaijan		
	Road 15	375	Kermanshah	Saqez	Ravansar, Paveh, Marivan	Kurdistan, Kermanshah		
	Road 16	428	Astara	Serow	Ardabil, Sarab, Tabriz, Urmia	Gilan, Ardabil, East Azerbaijan, West Azerbaijan		
	Road 17	252	Islamabad-e Gharb	Mehran	Eyvan, Ilam	Kermanshah, Ilam		
	Road 18	462	Maravehtapeh	Bandar Gaz	Kalaleh, Gonbad-e Qabus, Aqqala, Bandar Torkaman, Bandar Gaz, Galugah, Behshahr, Neka, Amirabad, Bahnemir, Babolsar, Fereydunkenar, Mahmudabad	Golestan, Mazandaran		
	Road 19	173	Pol-e Dokhtar	Islamabad-e Gharb		Kermanshah, Ilam, Lorestan		
	Road 21	978	Ilam	Jolfa	Tabriz, Bonab, Miandoab, Saqqez, Sanandaj, Kermanshah, Sarableh	East Azerbaijan, West Azerbaijan, Kurdistan, Kermanshah, Ilam		
	Road 22	1,327	Sarakhs	Punel	Mashhad, Bojnurd, Gorgan, Sari, Chalus, Rasht	Razavi Khorasan, North Khorasan, Golestan, Mazandaran, Gilan		
	Road 23	390	Miandoab	Hamadan	Shahindezh, Takab, Bijar, Bahar	West Azerbaijan, Kurdistan, Hamadan		
	Road 24	142	Hashtrud	Bonab	Hashtrud, Maragheh	East Azerbaijan		
	Road 26	151	Meyaneh	Piranshahr	Mahabad, Piranshahr	East Azerbaijan, West Azerbaijan		
	Road 27	245	Khomarlu	Tabriz	Kalibar, Ahar	East Azerbaijan		
	Road 31	539	Parsabad	Manjil	Ardabil, Khalkhal	Ardabil, East Azerbaijan, Zanjan		
	Road 32	880	Tehran	Bazargan	Karaj, Qazvin, Takestan, Abhar, Khorramdarreh, Zanjan, Tabriz, Marand, Maku	Tehran, Alborz, Qazvin, Zanjan, East Azerbaijan, West Azerbaijan		
	Road 33	155	Ardabil	Bilehsavar	Razi, Germi	Ardabil		
	Road 35	529	Zanjan	Khorramabad	Bijar, Qorveh, Sonqor, Nurabad	Zanjan, Kurdistan, Kermanshah, Lorestam		
	Road 36	330	Bardaskan	Taybad	Torbat, Kashmar, Khalilabad	Tehran, Semnan, Razavi Khorasan		
	Road 37	942	Takestan	Khorramshahr	Hamadan, Borujerd, Khorramabad, Poldokhtar, Andimeshk, Ahvaz	Qazvin, Hamadan, Lorestan, Khuzestan		
	Road 38	158	Tehran	Khorramdasht	Shahriar, Buin Zahra	Tehran, Alborz, Qazvin		
	Road 39	123	Andimeshk	Abadan	Dezful, Shushtar, Ahvaz	Khuzestan		
	Road 41	527	Khorramshahr	Ahvaz		Khuzestan		
	Road 43	78	Mahshahr	Ramhormoz	Ramshir	Khuzestan		
	Road 44	860	Mashhad	Tehran	Semnan, Damghan, Shahrud, Sabzevar, Neyshabur	Tehran, Semnan, Razavi Khorasan		
	Road 45	194	Shushtar	Bandar Deylam	Behbahan, Ramhormoz	Khuzestan, Bushehr		
	Road 46	300	Hamadan	Marivan	Qorveh, Sanandaj	Hamadan, Kurdistan		
	Road 47	655	Soltanieh	Shahinshahr	Qeydar, KabudarahangHamadan, Arak, Khomeyn, Golpayegan,	Zanjan, Hamadan, Markazi, Isfahan		
	Road 48	604	Saveh	Khosravi	Hamadan, Asadabad, Kangavar, Sahneh, Kermanshah, Islamabad-e Gharb, Kerend-e Gharb, Sarpol-e Zahab, Qasr-e Shirin	Markazi, Hamadan, Kermanshah		
	Road 49	495	Saveh	Astara	Buin Zahra, Qazvin, Manjil, Rasht, Rezvanshahr, Hashtpar	Markazi, Qazvin, Gilan		
	Road 51	150.5	Esfahan	Gahro	Falavarjan, Zarrinshahr, Shahr-e Kord	Isfahan, Chaharmahal and Bakhtiari		
	Road 53	62	Shahr-e Kord	Borujen		Chaharmahal and Bakhtiari		
	Road 55	547	Bushehr	Mobarakeh	Nurabad, Yasuj, Borujen	Isfahan, Kohgiluyeh and Buyer-ahmad, Fars, Bushehr		
	Road 56	248	Qom	Borujerd	Salafchegan Arak	Qom, Markazi, Lorestan		
	Road 58	220	Kashan	Aligudarz	Delijan, Mahallat, Khomeyn	Isfahan, Markazi, Lorestan		
	Road 59	160	Karaj	Chalus		Mazandaran, Alborz		
	Road 62	655	Tabas	Chalanchulan	Jandagh, Na'in, Esfahan, Najafabad, Tiran, Daran, Aligoudarz, Azna, Dorud	Isfahan, Lorestan		
	Road 63	128	Shahreza	Pataveh	Semirom	Isfahan, Chaharmahal and Bakhtiari		
	Road 64	271	Mehran	Poldokhtar	Dehloran	Khuzestan, Ilam		
	Road 65	1,208	Tehran	Siraf	Eslamshahr, Saveh, Salafchegan, Delijan, Meymeh, Shahinshahr, Esfahan, Shahreza, Abadeh, Marvdasht, Shiraz, Firuzabad, Jam	Tehran, Markazi, Qom, Isfahan, Fars, Bushehr		
	Road 67	807	Yasuj	Bandar Lengeh	Ardakan, Shiraz, Jahrom, Lar, Bastak	Kohgiluyeh and Buyer-ahmad, Fars, Hormozgan		
	Road 68	696	Ashkezar	Birjand	Tabas	South Khorasan, Yazd		
	Road 71	1,244	Tehran	Bandarabbas	Qom, Kashan, Yazd, Sirjan	Tehran, Qom, Isfahan, Yazd, Kerman, Hormozgan		
	Road 72	503	Shahreza	Ahvaz	Borujen, Izeh, Ramhormoz	Isfahan, Chaharmahal and Bakhtiari, Khuzestan		
	Road 73	75	Incheh Borun	Gorgan	Aqqala	Golestan		
	Road 77	158	Tehran	Mahmudabad	Rudehen, Amol	Tehran, Mazandaran		
	Road 78	647	Yasuj	Ravar	Eqlid, Abarkuh, Yazd, Bafq	Kohgiluyeh and Buyer-ahmad, Fars, Yazd, Kerman		
	Road 79	247	Rudehen	Qaemshahr	Firuzkuh, Pol-e Sefid	Tehran, Mazandaran		
	Road 81	494	Sari	Kharanaq	Damghan, Jandagh, Khur	Mazandaran, Semnan, Isfahan, Yazd		
	Road 82	285	Safashahr	Zarand	Marvast, Bavanat	Fars, Yazd, Kerman		
	Road 83	211	Dashli Borun	Shahrud	Gonbad Qabus, Azadshahr	Golestan, Semnan		
	Road 84	824	Mirjaveh	Anar	Zahedan, bam, Mahan, Kerman, Rafsenjan	Kerman, Sistan and Baluchestan		
	Road 85	332	Mehriz	Neyriz	Marvast, Meshkan	Yazd, Fars		
	Road 86	1,248	Bagheyn	Ahvaz	Sirjan, Neyriz, Shiraz, Dogonbadan, Behbahan	Khuzestan, Kohgiluyeh and Buyer-ahmad, Fars, Kerman		
	Road 87	456	Bojnurd	Gonabad	Esfarayen, Sabzevar, Bardeskan, Bajestan	North Khorasan, Razavi Khorasan		
	Road 88	280	Sirjan	Jiroft	Baft	Kerman		
	Road 90	624	Minab	Pishin	Sardasht, Bent, Nikshahr, Qasr-e Qand	Hormozgan, Sistan and Baluchestan		
	Road 91	1,720	Feyzabad	Jask	Ferdows, Ravar, Kerman, Jiroft, Kahnuj, Minab	Razavi Khorasan, South Khorasan, Yazd, Kerman, Hormozgan		
	Road 92	1,124	Fasa	Kuhak	Darab, Hajiabad, Kahnuj, Iranshahr, Saravan	Fars, Hormozgan, Kerman, Sistan and Baluchestan		
	Road 93	697	Narmashir	Chabahar	Bampur, Nikshahr	Sistan and Baluchestan, Kerman		
	Road 94	905	Ahram	Minab	Farashband, Firuzabad, Khonj, Lar	Bushehr, Fars, Hormozgan		
	Road 95	1,636	Mashhad	Chabahar	Torbat, Birjand, Zahedan	Razavi Khorasan, South Khorasan, Sistan and Baluchestan		
	Road 96	1,150	Shalamcheh	Bandarabbas	Khorramshahr, Abadan, Mahshahr, Bandar Ganaveh, Borazjan, Asaluyeh, Bandar Lengeh	Khuzestan, Bushehr, Hormozgan		
	Road 97	200	Mashhad	Taybad	Fariman, Torbat-e Jam	Razavi Khorasan		
	Road 98	493	Jask	Guatr	Chabahar	Hormozgan, Sistan and Baluchestan		
	Road 99	940	Sarakhs	Dashak	Zabol	Razavi Khorasan, South Khorasan, Sistan and Baluchestan		

=== Connection lines ===
Symbol	Number of road	Distance (km)	From	To	Major Cities	Provinces	Itinerary	Image
	Road 51–53	33	Zarrinshahr	Sefid Dasht		Isfahan, Chaharmahal and Bakhtiari		
	Road 65–67	168	Sa'adat Shahr	Khavaran	Arsanjan, Kharameh, Sarvestan	Fars		

== Second Level Roads ==
Symbol	Number of road	Distance (km)	From	To	Major Cities	Itinerary	Image
	Road 122	60	Safashahr	Surian			
	Road 144	148	Hadishahr	Varzaqan	Siahrud		
	Road 145	46	Varzaqan	Khajeh			
	Road 164	101	Neyriz	Kherameh			
	Road 165	67	Yengejeh	Duzduzan	Heris – Mehraban		
	Road 213	30	Miandoab	Fesenduz			
	Road 222	116	Hasan Rud	Rahimabad	Khoshk-e Bijar – Kiashahr – Langrud – Amlash		
	Road 224	114	Emamqoli	Lotfabad (Turkmenistan)	Dargaz		
	Road 245	130	Qarah Aghaj	Khorasanak	Nazarkahrizi – Qarah Kalak – Aziz Kandi ( ) – Hashtrud		
	Road 256	7	Rasht	Pir Bazar			
	Road 274	37.2	Sambaran	Hurand			
	Road 276	45.3	Salman Kandi	Heris			
	Road 313	32	Firuzabad	Fuman	Khalkhal – Masuleh		
	Road 315	117	Kajal	Asalem ( AH8)	Khalkhal		
	Road 316	67.5	Ganjgah	Mianeh			
	Road 324	73	Qareh Chaman	Mianeh	Torkamanchay		
	Road 349	10	Rasht	Katigar	Lakan		
	Road 356	54	Sonqor	Asadabad			
	Road 358	103	Nurabad	Malayer	Nahavand		
	Road 382	110	Esfarayen	Jajarm	Garmeh		
	Road 425	58	Lavasan	Gachsar	Fasham, Dizin		
	Road 493	20	Punel	Masal	Shanderman		
	Road 494	98	Masal	Astaneh Ashrafiyeh	Ziabar, Khomam, Khoshk-e Bijar		
	Road 497	21	Sangar	Zibakenar	Kuchesfahan; Lasht-e Nesha		
	Road 514	84	Shahrekord	Chelgard	Sureshjan, Farsan, Babaheydar		
	Road 522	72	Jokar	Kangavar	Tuyserkan		
	Road 551	58	Mobarakeh	Shahreza	Talkhuncheh		
	Road 554	180	Sangar	Mishan-e Sofla	Nurabad-Baba Monir		
	Road 556	102	Aluni	Dehdez	Lordegan		
	Road 586	132	Golpayegan	Kashan	Muteh		
	Road 587	89	Meymeh	Kashan	Jowsheqan va Kamu, Qamsar		
	Road 593	58	Marzanabad	Abbasabad			
	Road 654	51	Bagh-e Yek	Tafresh	Bagh-e Yek ( )		
	Road 656	113	Isfahan Refinery	Ardestan	Gaz-e Borkhvar ( ), Dastgerd, Dolatabad, Habibabad, Komshecheh		
	Road 665	144	Murcheh Khvort	Kashan	Natanz, Deh Zireh ( )		
	Road 674	168	Azizabad	Qir	Meymand – Duzeh – Jahrom		
	Road 678	64	Lamerd	Galleh Dar	Mohr		
	Road 744	77	Shiraz	Kharameh	Darian		
	Road 779	10	Bahnemir	Kiakola			
	Road 781	116	Marvdasht	Hajiabad	Dorudzan		
	Road 783	46	Madar Soleyman (Pasargad)	Arsanjan	Saadatshahr		
	Road 795	38	Shirgah	Babol			
	Road 798	67	Pol-e Sefid	Takam ( AH70)			
	Road 799	15	Qaemshahr	Kiakola			
	Road 864	157	Neyriz	Arsanjan	Abadeh Tashk		
	Road 817	242	Mollasani	Habibabad, Shushtar	Ramin	29	
	Road 875 AH78	242	Sabzevar	Bajgiran (Turkmenistan)	Quchan		
	Road 902	69	Bandar-e Pol	Qeshm			
	Road 933	120	Mo'inabad	Farashband	Kazerun – Baladeh		
	Road 945	157	Mahlacheh	Lamerd	Beyram – Eshkanan		
	Road 946	172	Khonj	Shirinu	Alamarvdasht – Galehdar		
	Road 947	110	Bast-e Faryab	Darz			

== Historical ==
- Royal Road
- Silk Road

== Asian Highways ==
- AH1
- AH2
- AH8
- AH70
- AH71
- AH72
- AH75
- AH78
- AH82
- AH88

== Sources ==
- "Iran Road Maintenance & Transportation Organization".
- "Road management center of Iran". Archived from the original on 31 October 2017.
- "Ministry of Roads & Urban Development of Iran".
