= Road 90 (Iran) =

Road 90
- جاده 90

Route information
- Length: 642 km (399 mi)

Major junctions
- East end: Minab, Hormozgan Province; Road 91
- Road 93; Road 95
- West end: Pishin, Sistan and Baluchistan Province

Location
- Country: Iran
- Provinces: Hormozgan Province; Sistan and Baluchistan Province
- Major cities: Sardasht, Hormozgan Province Bent, Sistan and Baluchistan Province; Nikshahr, Sistan and Baluchistan Province Qasr-e Qand, Sistan and Baluchistan Province

Highway system
- Highways in Iran; Freeways

Road 90 (or Minab-Pishin road) is a major road in Iran. This road connects Minab in Hormozgan Province to Pishin in Sistan and Baluchistan Province.
