= Mishan-e Sofla =

Mishan-e Sofla or Mishan Sofla (Persian: ميشان سفلي) may refer to:

- Mishan-e Sofla, Chaharmahal and Bakhtiari
- Mishan-e Sofla, Fars
