= Mishan, Iran =

Mishan (Persian: ميشان) in Iran may refer to:

- Mishan-e Olya, Chaharmahal and Bakhtiari
- Mishan-e Sofla, Chaharmahal and Bakhtiari
- Mishan-e Olya, Fars
- Mishan-e Sofla, Fars
- Mishan, Hamadan
- Mishan, Isfahan
- Mishan Rural District, in Fars Province
