= Road 87 (Iran) =

Road in Iran

Road 87
- جاده 87

Route information
- Part of AH78
- Length: 456 km (283 mi)

Major junctions
- From: Bojnurd, North Khorasan; Road 22
- Road 44; Road 36; Road 91
- To: Gonabad, Razavi Khorasan; Road 95

Location
- Country: Iran
- Provinces: North Khorasan, Razavi Khorasan
- Major cities: Esfarayen, North Khorasan; Sabzevar, Razavi Khorasan; Bardeskan, Razavi Khorasan; Bajestan, Razavi Khorasan

Highway system
- Highways in Iran; Freeways

Road 87 is a road in eastern Iran. It connects Bojnurd to Sabzevar, Bardaskan, Bajestan and Gonabad in south Razavi Khorasan.
