= Road 85 (Iran) =

Road in Iran

Road 85
- جاده 85

Route information
- Length: 327 km (203 mi)

Major junctions
- From: Mehriz, Yazd; Road 71
- Road 82; Road 89
- To: Neyriz, Fars; Road 86

Location
- Country: Iran
- Provinces: Fars, Yazd
- Major cities: Harat, Marvast Yazd; Meshkan, Fars

Highway system
- Highways in Iran; Freeways

Road 85 is a road in central Iran connecting Mehriz to Marvast, Harat, Meshkan, Neyriz.
