= Road 36 (Iran) =

Road in Iran

Road 36
- جاده 36

Route information
- Part of AH1
- Length: 986 km (613 mi)

Major junctions
- From: Islam Qala, Razavi Khorasan; Afghanistan
- Road 97; Road 95; Road 87; Road 81; Road 44

Location
- Country: Iran
- Provinces: Razavi Khorasan, Semnan, Tehran
- Major cities: Torbat-e Heydarieh, Razavi Khorasan; Kashmar, Razavi Khorasan; Khalil Abad, Razavi Khorasan; Bardeskan, Razavi Khorasan; Biyarjomand, Semnan; Semnan, Semnan

Highway system
- Highways in Iran; Freeways

Road 36 is a road in eastern Iran. It connects Firuzkuh to Semnan and to Road 81, Damghan–Nain Road. Then it goes through the newly built section between Tarud and Biyarjomand to Bardaskan continuing towards Taybad and Afghanistan's Islam Qala via Torbat-e Heydarieh.
