= Mishani =

Mishani (Hebrew: משעני) is a Hebrew surname. Notable people with the surname include:

- Batia Mishani (1945–1996), Israeli athlete
- Dror Mishani (born 1975), Israeli crime writer, translator and literary scholar
- Mordechai Mishani (1945–2013), Israeli politician

== See also ==
- Misha (disambiguation)
- Mishan (disambiguation)
