= Nik Shahr Castle =

Castle in Sistan and Baluchestan Province, Iran

Nik Shahr castle
- قلعه نیکشهر
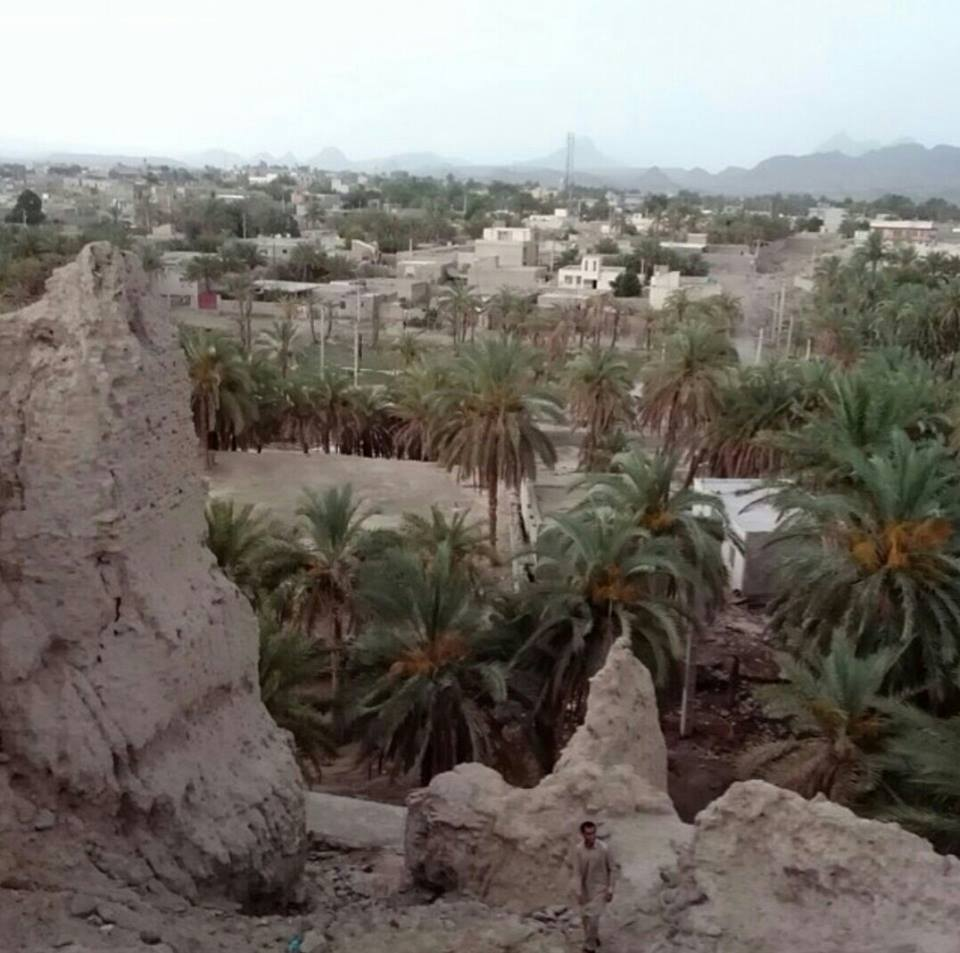
- Interactive map of the Nik Shahr castle area

General information
- Type: Castle
- Location: Nik Shahr, Iran

Nik Shahr castle (Persian: قلعه نیکشهر) is a historical castle located in Nik Shahr County in Sistan and Baluchestan Province, The longevity of this fortress dates back to the Parthian Empire.
