= Mishan-e Olya =

Mishan-e Olya (Persian: ميشان عليا) may refer to:

- Mishan-e Olya, Chaharmahal and Bakhtiari
- Mishan-e Olya, Fars
