= Road 82 (Iran) =

Road in Iran

Road 82
- جاده 82

Route information
- Length: 449 km (279 mi)

Major junctions
- From: Safashahr, Fars; Road 65
- Road 71; Road 84
- To: Chatrud, Kerman; Road 91

Location
- Country: Iran
- Provinces: Fars, Yazd, Kerman
- Major cities: Bavanat, Fars; Harat, Yazd; Shahr-e Babak, Kerman; Rafsanjan, Kerman; Zarand, Kerman

Highway system
- Highways in Iran; Freeways

Road 82 is a road in central Iran connecting Safashahr to Bavanat, Harat, Shahr-e Babak, Rafsanjan and Zarand.
