= Neka–Jask pipeline =

Proposed oil pipeline in Iran

Location
- Country: Iran
- Direction: north–south
- Start: Neka, Iran
- To: Jask, Iran

General information
- Type: oil
- Operator: National Iranian Oil Company

Technical information
- Length: 1,515 km (941 mi)
- Maximum discharge: 1 million barrels per day (~5.0×10^{7} t/a)

The Neka–Jask pipeline is a proposed oil pipeline in Iran. If constructed, it will transport crude oil from Kazakhstan, Azerbaijan, Turkmenistan and Russia through the port of Neka on the Caspian Sea to Jask, Iran on the Gulf of Oman. The planned capacity of the 1,515 kilometres (941 mi) pipeline is 1 million barrels per day (~5.0×10^{7} t/a) of crude oil. It is expected to cost US$2 billion.
