= Road 81 (Iran) =

Road in Iran

Road 81
- جاده 81
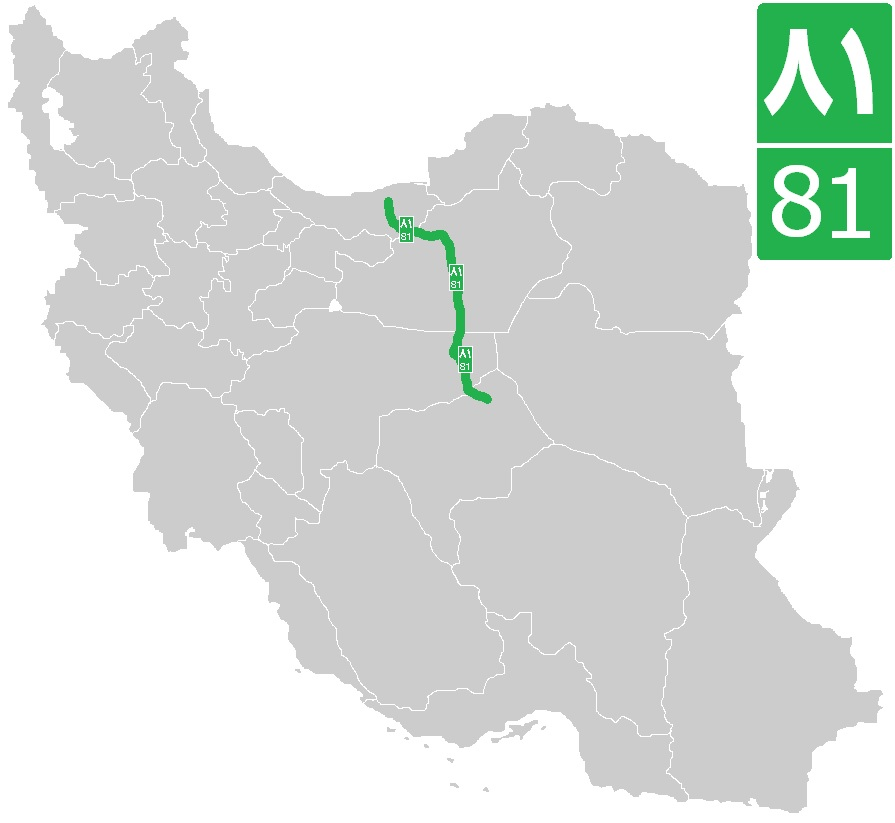

Route information
- Part of AH70
- Length: 650 km (400 mi)

Major junctions
- From: Sari, Mazandaran; Road 22
- Road 44; Road 36; Road 62
- To: Near Kharanaq, Yazd; Road 68

Location
- Country: Iran
- Provinces: Mazandaran, Semnan, Isfahan, Yazd
- Major cities: Damghan, Semnan; Jandaq, Semnan; Khur, Esfahan

Highway system
- Highways in Iran; Freeways

Road 81 is a road in central Iran. It starts from Sari, goes to Damghan and passes Dasht-e Kavir and Road 62 and Khur and ends at Yazd-Mashhad Road.
