= Road 92 (Iran) =

Road in Iran

Road 92
- جاده 92

Route information
- Length: 1,124 km (698 mi)

Major junctions
- From: Fars province Road 86
- Road 71; Road 91; Road 93; Road 95
- To: Saravan, Sistan and Baluchistan

Location
- Country: Iran
- Provinces: Fars, Hormozgan, Kerman, Sistan and Baluchistan
- Major cities: Fasa, Fars; Darab, Fars; Haji Abad, Hormozgan; Kahnuj, Kerman; Iranshahr, Sistan and Baluchistan

Highway system
- Highways in Iran; Freeways

Road 92 is a road in Iran. The western part of it is a part of Shiraz-Bandarabbas road. The central part passes northern Hamun Jazmurian Lake. The eastern part connects Iranshahr to Saravan.
