= Road 44 (Iran) =

Road in Iran

Road 44
- جاده 44
- Imam Reza Highway

Route information
- Part of AH1 AH70
- Length: 860 km (530 mi)

Major junctions
- From: Tehran, Tehran; Basij Expressway; Azadegan Expressway; Khavaran Street
- Road 36; Road 81; Road 83; Road 87; Road 95
- To: Mashhad, Razavi Khorasan; Freeway 2 / Road 97

Location
- Country: Iran
- Provinces: Razavi Khorasan, Semnan, Tehran
- Major cities: Semnan, Semnan; Damghan, Semnan; Shahrood, Semnan; Sabzevar, Razavi Khorasan; Nishapur, Razavi Khorasan

Highway system
- Highways in Iran; Freeways

Road 44 is a major road in Iran linking Tehran and Mashhad. This road is mostly an Expressway and is a part of the Asian Highway 1 route. This road is one of the most important and strategic main roads of the country since it connects the traffic of the north-eastern provinces of the country to the central provinces and the capital, Tehran.

== Gallery ==
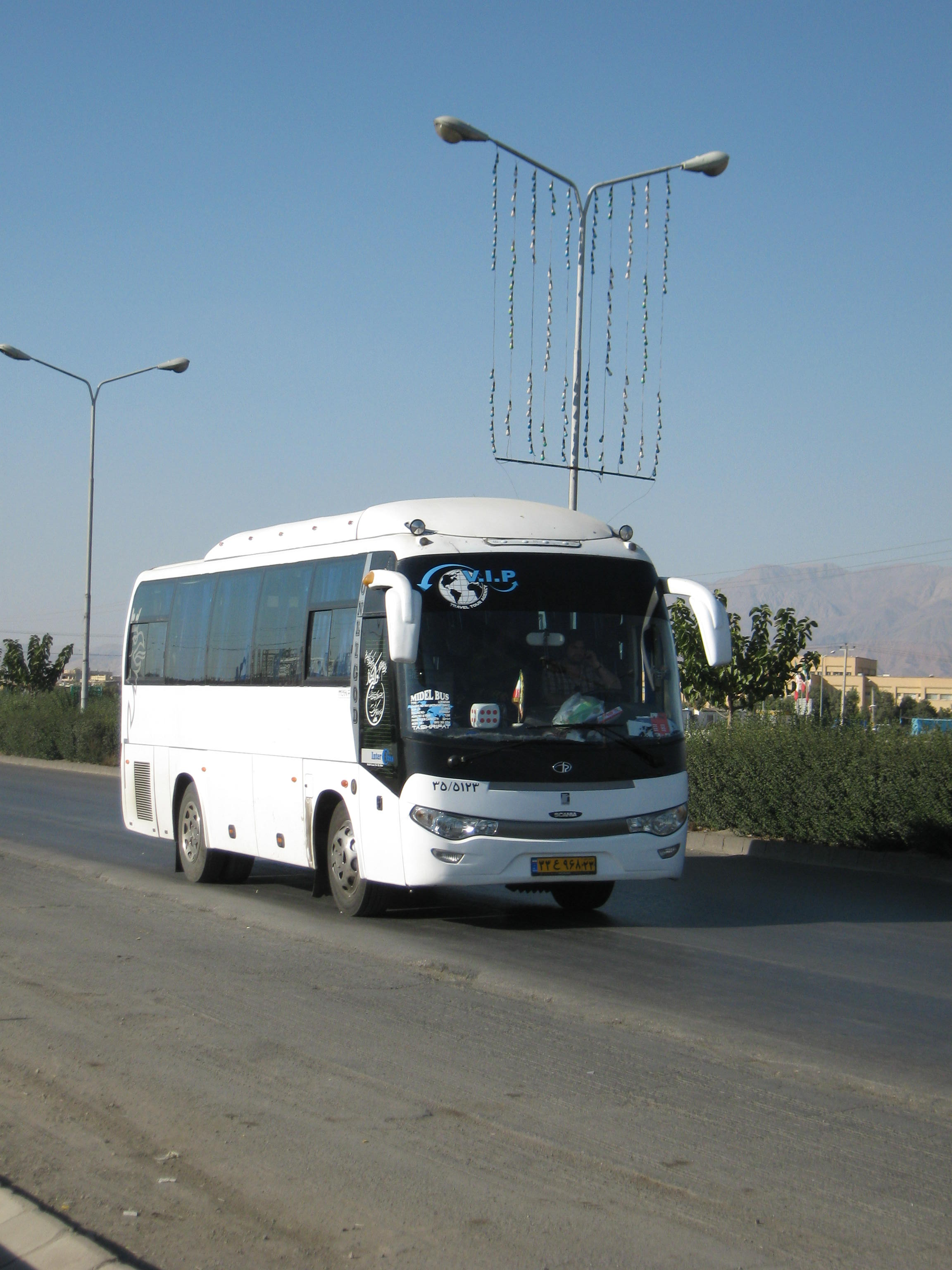
Road 44 East of Iran, Nishapur

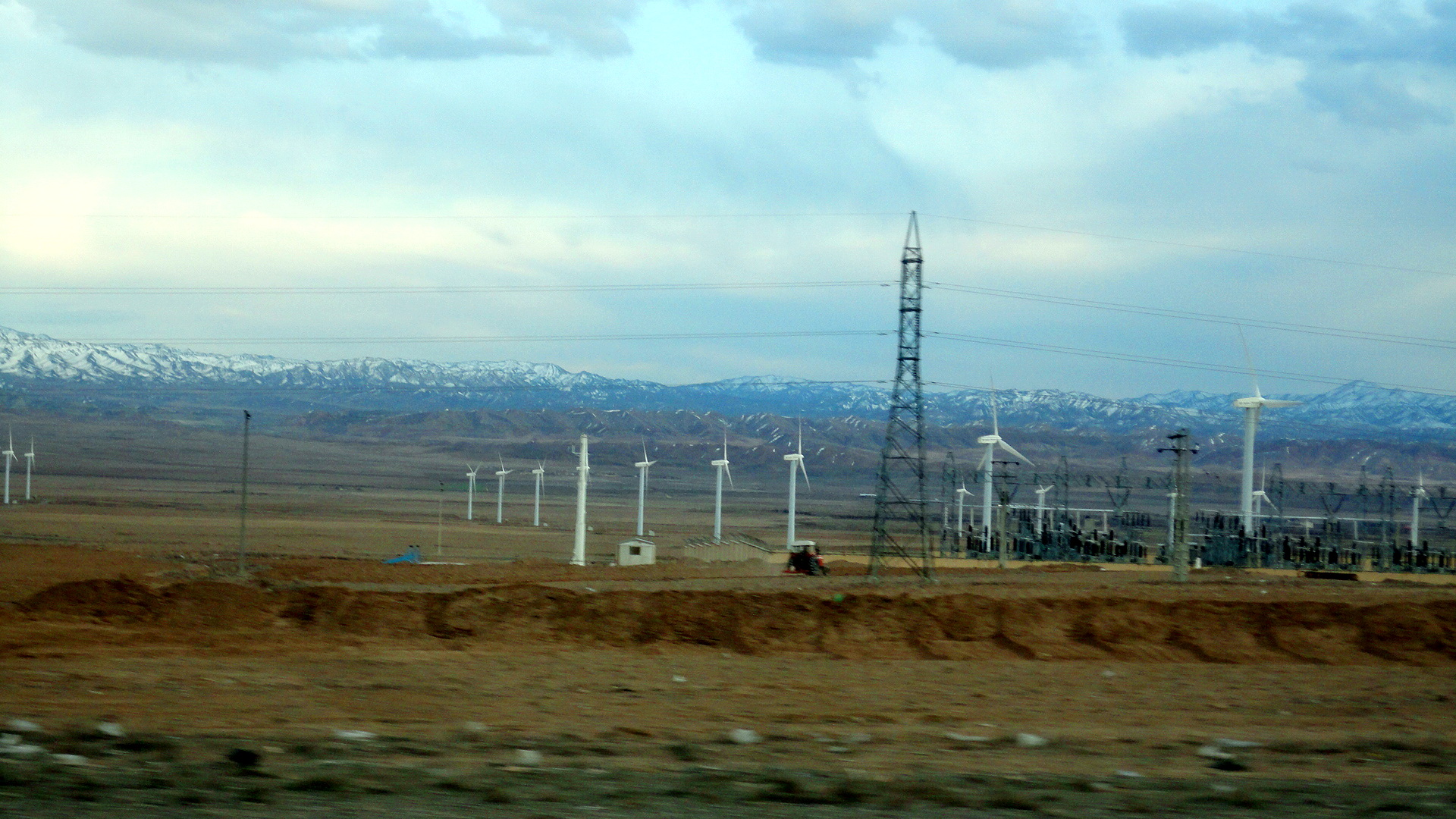
Wind turbines in between Mashhad and Nishapur, road 44

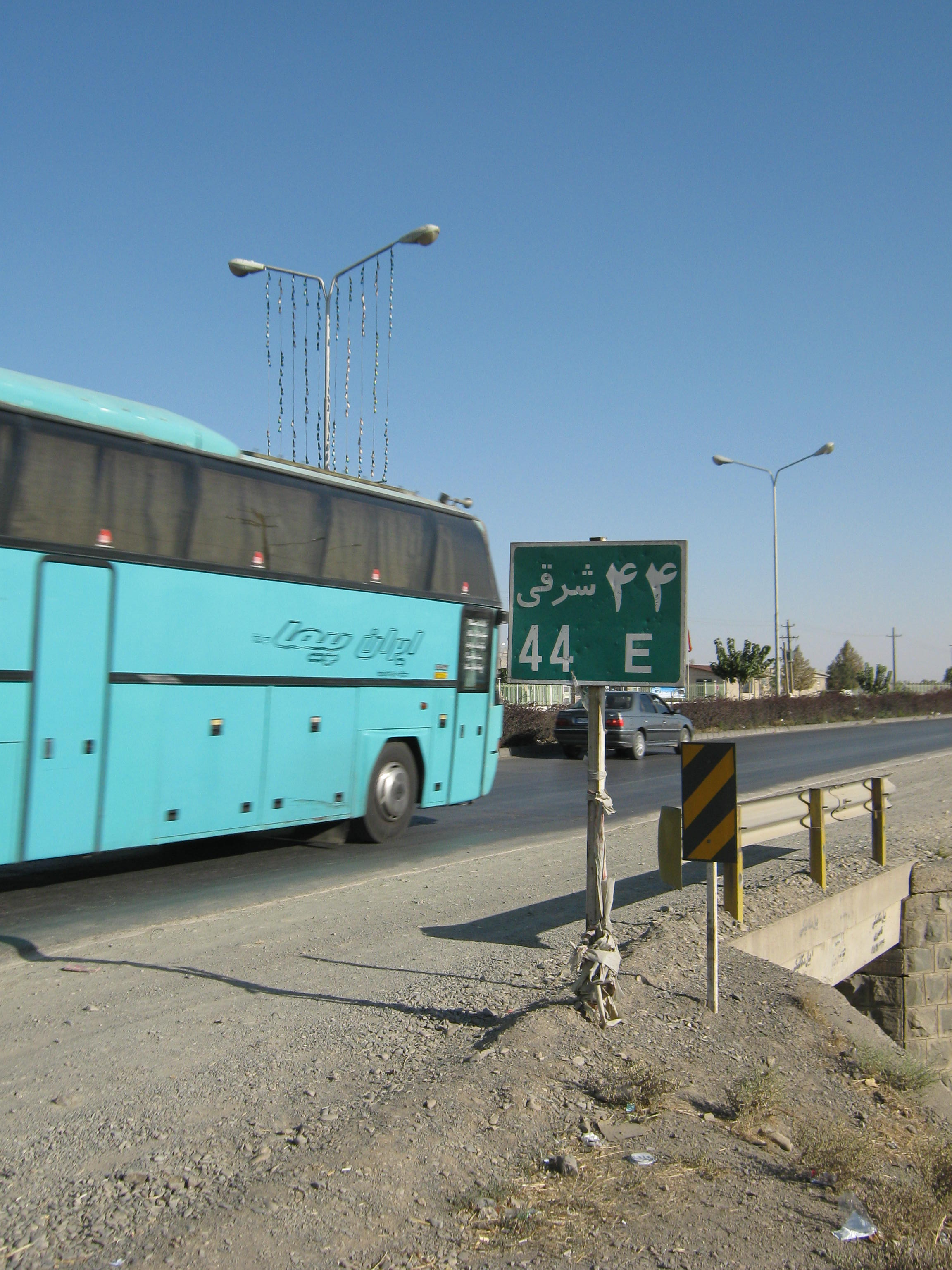
Road 44 East of Iran, Nishapur
