= Road 99 (Iran) =

Road in Iran

Road 99
- جاده 99

Route information
- Part of AH71
- Length: 940 km (580 mi)

Major junctions
- From: Sarakhs, Khorasan Razavi
- To: Road 95, Sistan and Baluchestan

Location
- Country: Iran
- Provinces: Khorasan Razavi, South Khorasan, Sistan and Baluchestan
- Major cities: Zabol, Sistan and Baluchestan

Highway system
- Highways in Iran; Freeways

Road 99 is the most eastern road in Iran. It is a road connecting Iranian border forts to each other used to move supplies to this fort to fight drug trafficking. The only important part is the southern part connecting Zabol to Zahedan and Birjand road. It was built by emperor Mozaffar ad-Din Shah Qajar in the 1890s to act as a military supply route for the Eastern border.
