= Road 93 (Iran) =

Road in Iran

Road 93
- جاده 93

Route information
- Length: 697 km (433 mi)

Major junctions
- From: Narmashir, Kerman; Road 84
- Road 92
- To: Near Chabahar, Sistan and Baluchestan; Road 98

Location
- Country: Iran
- Provinces: Kerman, Sistan and Baluchestan
- Major cities: Bampour, Sistan and Baluchestan; Nikshahr, Sistan and Baluchestan

Highway system
- Highways in Iran; Freeways

Road 93 is a road in south-west Iran connecting Chabahar to Nikshahr, Iranshahr and Kerman-Zahedan Road near Bam.
