= Mishan (disambiguation) =

Mishan is a county-level city in Heilongjiang, People's Republic of China.

Mishan may also refer to:

- Mishan, Iran (disambiguation), multiple places
- E. J. Mishan, English economist
- Snir Mishan, Israeli footballer
- Mishan (housing), assisted housing network, Israel

== See also ==
- Meshan
