= Road 95 (Iran) =

Road in Iran

Road 95
- جاده 95

Route information
- Part of AH75
- Length: 1,636 km (1,017 mi)

Major junctions
- From: Mashhad, Razavi Khorasan; Road 44
- Road 36; Road 91; Road 68; Road 99; Road 84; Road 92; Road 98; Road 93
- To: Chabahar, Sistan and Baluchestan; Road 98

Location
- Country: Iran
- Provinces: Razavi Khorasan, South Khorasan, Sistan and Baluchestan
- Major cities: Torbat e Heydariyeh, Razavi Khorasan; Birjand, South Khorasan; Zahedan, Sistan and Baluchestan

Highway system
- Highways in Iran; Freeways

Road 95 is the most important north–south road in eastern Iran. It connects Mashhad to Torbat e Heydariyeh, Birjand, Zahedan and then Chabahar.
