= Road 84 (Iran) =

Road in Iran

Road 84
- جاده 84

Route information
- Part of AH2
- Length: 824 km (512 mi)

Major junctions
- From: Mirjaveh, Sistan and Baluchestan (Pakistan) Pakistani Border; N-40
- Road 86; Road 91; Road 93; Road 95
- To: Anar, Kerman; Road 71

Location
- Country: Iran
- Provinces: Sistan and Baluchestan, Kerman
- Major cities: Zahedan, Sistan and Baloochestan; Bam, Kerman; Mahan, Kerman; Kerman, Kerman

Highway system
- Highways in Iran; Freeways

Road 84 is a road in southeastern Iran. It is the most important transit road in that area of Iran. It connects Pakistan to Kerman and Tehran Road 71.

== Gallery ==
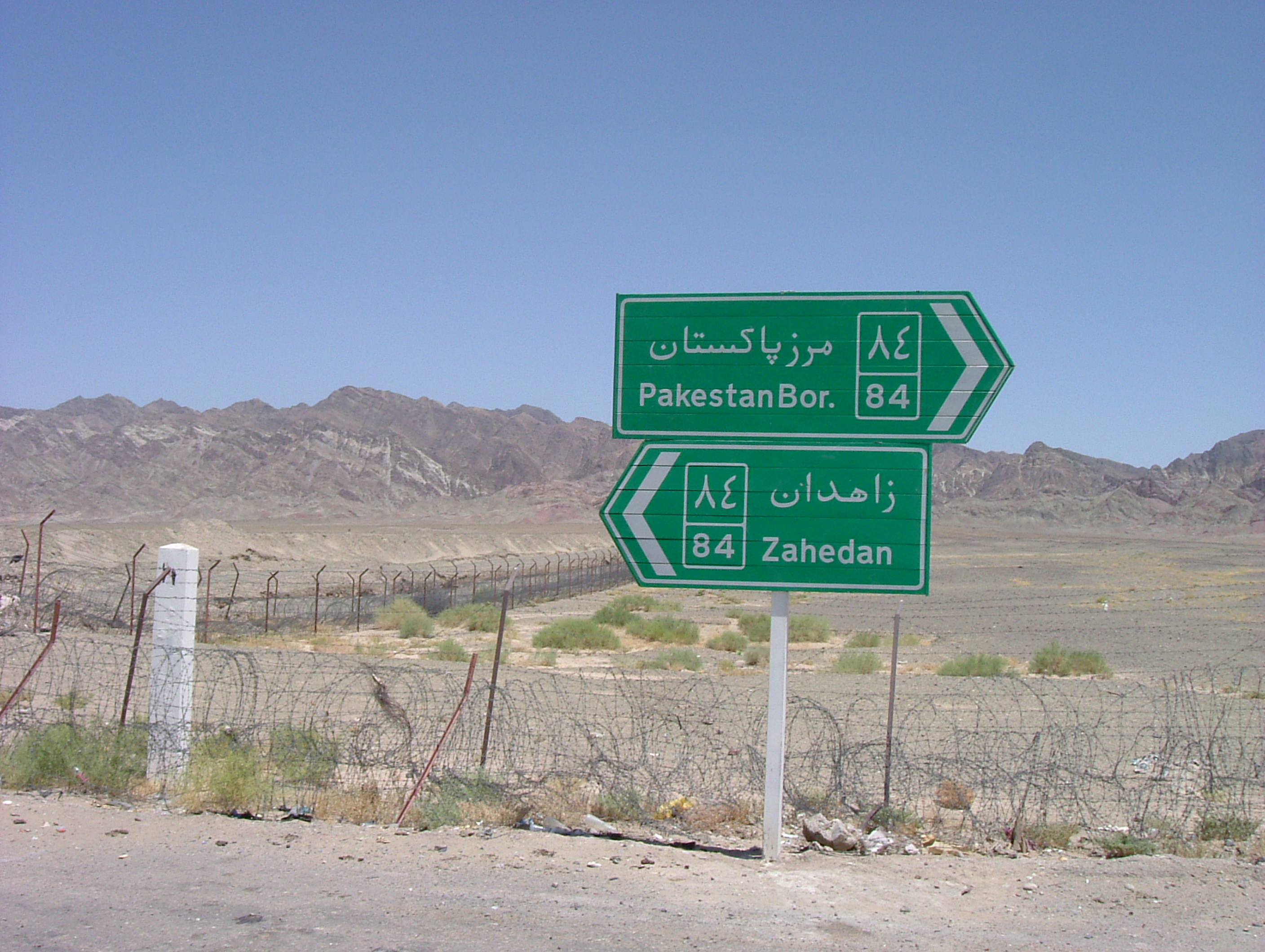
A Sign between Zahedan and Pakistan Border
