= Tourbat =

Variety of grape

- Grape (Vitis)
- Color of berry skin: Blanc
- Species: Vitis vinifera
- Also called: See list of synonyms
- Origin: France
- VIVC number: 12590

Tourbat is a white grape variety planted primarily in the French wine region of the Côtes du Roussillon AOC where is sometimes called Malvoisie du Roussillon. It is also found in the Italian wines from Sardinia where the grape is known as Torbato and in the Aragon region of Spain. As a varietal, Tourbat is known for its smoky notes.

== History ==
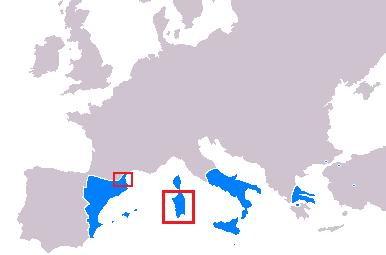
Wine historians believe that Tourbat took a similar path as Grenache in spreading from Spain to Roussillon and the island of Sardinia (highlighted) while both were under the Crown of Aragon (14th century territories pictured)

The exact origins of Tourbat are unknown, with some ampelographers and wine historian suggesting that it has a similar origins as Grenache and is likely a Spanish variety. Its presence in Roussillon seems to trace to that area's time under the Kingdom of Majorca with James I of Aragon was lord of over a wide expanse of land that crosses the modern-day borders of southern France and northern eastern Spain. Similarly, like Grenache, Tourbat may have spread to Sardinia when the island was under the rule of the Kingdom of Aragon.

Plantings of Tourbat greatly declined in the 20th century with Sardinia remaining the one significant source of the variety for a large part of that century. Even there the grape was on the verge of extinction until one producer, Sella & Mosca, began focusing on the variety and propagating healthier cuttings. Their work also lead to a slight resurgence of interest in the Roussillon region in the 1980s when the new cuttings of healthier vines were imported from Sardinia. However, overall the variety is still not widely planted.

== Wine regions ==
In Sardinia, Tourbat is known as Torbato and is grown around Alghero in the province of Sassari on the northwestern reaches of the island. In France, it is most widely planted in the Appellation d'Origine Contrôlée AOC region of the Côtes du Roussillon where the variety is known as Malvoisie du Roussillon.

== Wine styles ==
Tourbat tends to produce full-bodied wines with distinctive aromas that often include smoky notes.

== Synonyms ==
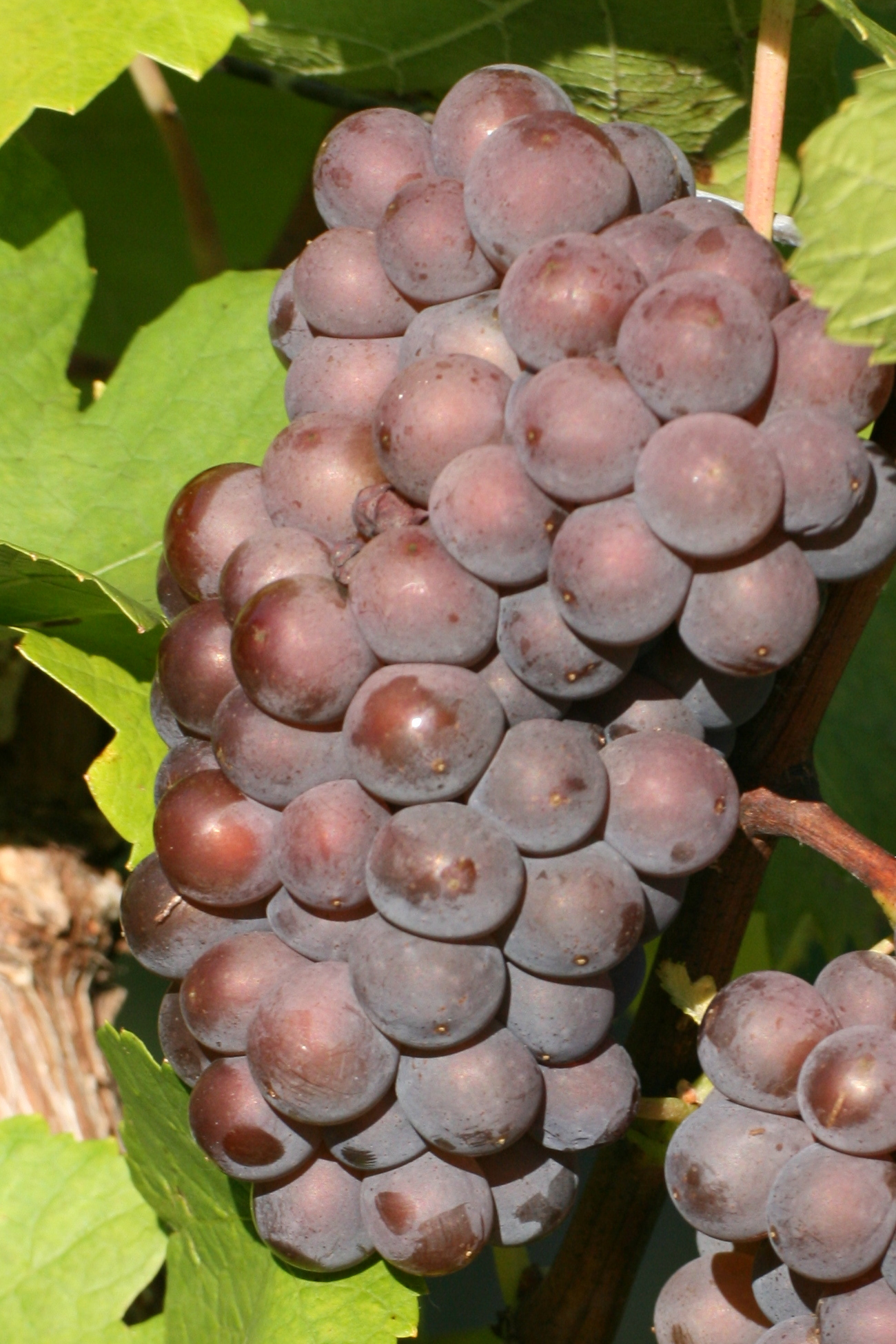
Despite the similarities in synonyms, Tourbat has no known relation to Pinot gris (pictured)

Tourbat and its wines are known under a variety of synonyms including Canina, Caninu, Cuscosedda Bianca, Malvoisie des Pyrenees Orientales, Malvoisie du Roussillon, Malvoisie Tourbat, Razola, Torbat, Torbato, Torbato Bianco, Trubat Iberica, Trubau, Turbato, and Turbau.

=== Other Malvoisies ===
Despite the similarities with the notable synonym of Tourbat, Malvoisie du Roussillon, Tourbat has no known relation with other grapes that share Malvoisie as a name or synonym-most notably Pinot gris but also Bourboulenc, Clairette, Macabeo and Vermentino.
