= Yengejeh, Heris =

Yengejeh ينگجه
- Village
- Location within Iran
- Coordinates: 38°18′11″N 46°52′05″E
- Country: Iran
- Province: East Azerbaijan
- County: Heris
- Bakhsh: Khvajeh
- Rural District: Bedevostan-e Gharbi

Population (2006)
  - Total: 151
- Time zone: UTC+3:30 (IRST)
  - Summer (DST): UTC+4:30 (IRDT)

Yengejeh (Persian: ينگجه; also known as Angija, Yengejeh Badostan, and Yengidzha) is a village in Bedevostan-e Gharbi Rural District, Khvajeh District, Heris County, East Azerbaijan Province, Iran. At the 2006 census, its population was 151, in 31 families.
