= Pol-e Sefid, Mazandaran =

City in Mazandaran province, Iran

Pol-e Sefid Persian: پل سفید
- City
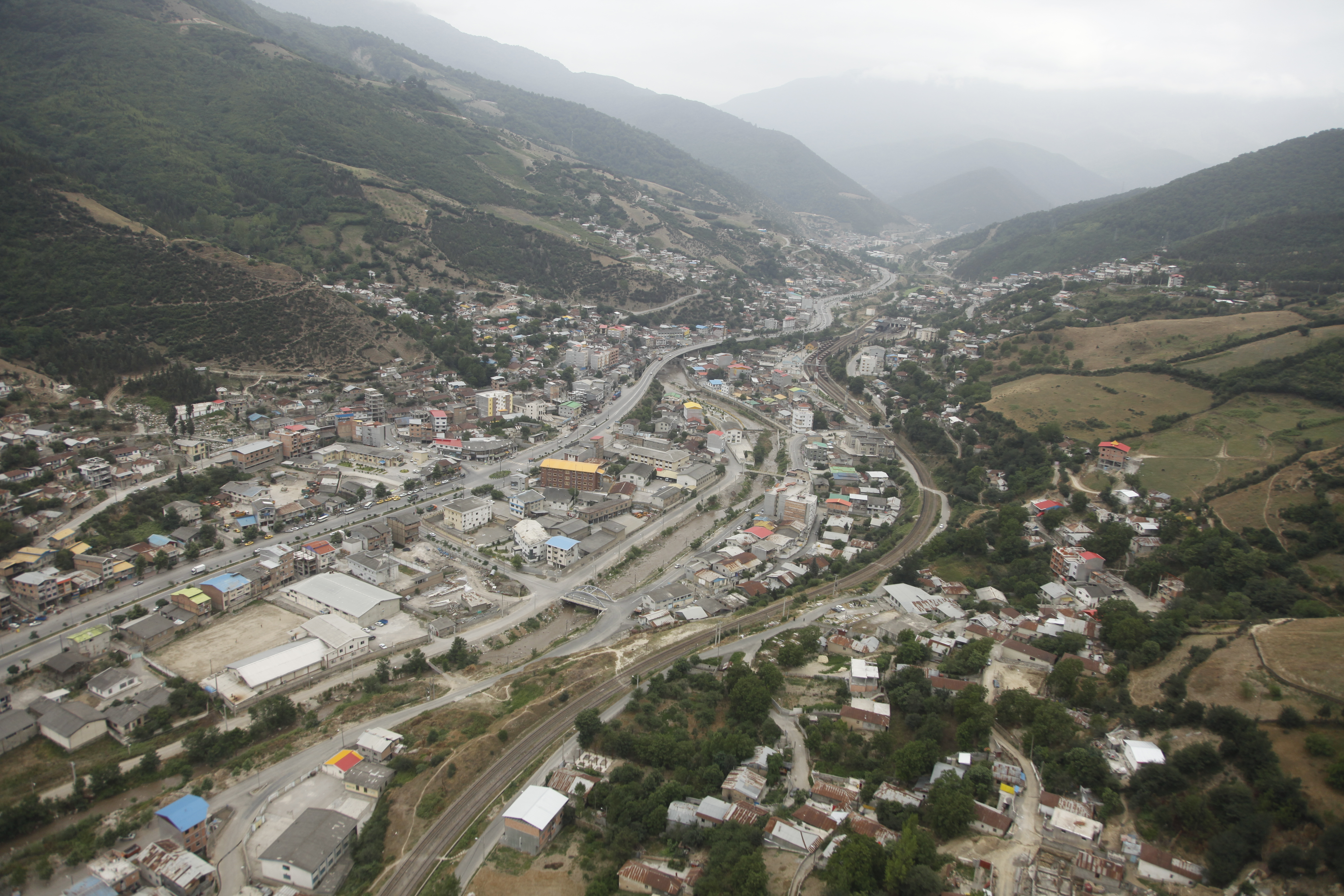
- The city of Pol-e Sefid

- Location within Iran
- Coordinates: 36°06′58″N 53°03′26″E
- Country: Iran
- Province: Mazandaran
- County: Savadkuh
- District: Central

Population (2016)
  - Total: 8,294
- Time zone: UTC+3:30 (IRST)

Pol-e Sefid (Persian: پل سفید) (Note: Also romanized as Pol Sefīd and Pol-e Sefid (English translation: White Bridge)) is a city in the Central District of Savadkuh County, Mazandaran province, Iran, serving as capital of both the county and the district.

== Demographics ==
=== Population ===
At the time of the 2006 National Census, the city's population was 8,473 in 2,163 households. The following census in 2011 counted 7,708 people in 2,241 households. The 2016 census measured the population of the city as 8,294 people in 2,680 households.
