= Tarud =

Tarud is a surname. Notable people with the surname include:

- Jorge Tarud (born 1953), Chilean politician;
- Rafael Tarud (1918–2009), Chilean politician.
