= Mahlacheh =

Mahlacheh مهلچه
- Village
- Location within Iran
- Coordinates: 27°46′27″N 53°41′36″E
- Country: Iran
- Province: Fars
- County: Evaz
- Bakhsh: Central
- Rural District: Fishvar

Population (2016)
  - Total: 453
- Time zone: UTC+3:30 (IRST)

Mahlacheh (Persian: مهلچه, also Romanized as Mahalcheh and Maḩlacheh; also known as Mahlakeh and Mahlejeh) is a village in Fishvar Rural District of Evaz County, Fars province, Iran. At the 2016 census, its population was 453, in 137 families.
