= AH71 =

Road in Asia

Asian Highway 71

Route information
- Length: 390 km (240 mi)

Major junctions
- North end: Dilaram, Afghanistan
- South end: Dashtak, Iran

Location
- Countries: Afghanistan; Iran

Highway system
- Asian Highway Network
← AH70	→ AH72

Asian Highway 71 (AH71) is a road in the Asian Highway Network running 390 km (245 miles) from Delaram, Afghanistan to Dashtak, Iran connecting AH1 to AH75 made with help of India

. The route is as follows:

== Afghanistan ==
- NH49 Delaram–Zaranj Highway: Delaram - Zaranj

== Iran ==
- Milak - Zabol
- Road 99: Zabol - Dashtak
