= Road 68 (Iran) =

Road in Iran

Road 68
- جاده 68

Route information
- Part of AH70
- Length: 696 km (432 mi)

Major junctions
- From: Ashkezar, Yazd; Road 71
- Road 81; Road 95
- To: Birjand, South Khorasan; Road 95

Location
- Country: Iran
- Provinces: Yazd, South Khorasan
- Major cities: Tabas, Yazd

Highway system
- Highways in Iran; Freeways

Road 68 is a road in central and eastern Iran in dry areas. It connects Yazd in Yazd Province, to Birjand in South Khorasan Province. This road is part of Yazd-Mashhad Road.

Along this road is the landing site codenamed "Desert One" (33°04′23″N 55°53′33″E), which was part of Operation Eagle Claw - the American hostage rescue attempt.
