= Sambaran =

Sambaran سامبران
- Village
- Location within Iran
- Coordinates: 38°34′39″N 47°12′58″E
- Country: Iran
- Province: East Azerbaijan
- County: Ahar
- Bakhsh: Central
- Rural District: Owch Hacha

Population (2006)
  - Total: 272
- Time zone: UTC+3:30 (IRST)
  - Summer (DST): UTC+4:30 (IRDT)

Sambaran (Persian: سامبران, also Romanized as Sāmbarān; also known as Mobābzān, Sambaram, Sānbarān, and Sānborān) is a village in Owch Hacha Rural District, in the Central District of Ahar County, East Azerbaijan Province, Iran. At the 2023 census, its population was 330, in 54 families.
