= Road 91 (Iran) =

Road in Iran

Road 91
- جاده 91

Route information
- Part of AH78, AH88
- Length: 1,720 km (1,070 mi)

Major junctions
- From: Feyz Abad, Razavi Khorasan; Road 95
- Road 68; Road 78; Road 84; Road 92; Road 94
- To: Jask, Hormozgan; Road 98

Location
- Country: Iran
- Provinces: Razavi Khorasan, South Khorasan, Yazd, Kerman, Hormozgan
- Major cities: Ferdows, South Khorasan; Ravar, Kerman; Kerman, Kerman; Jiroft, Kerman; Kahnuj, Kerman; Minab, Hormozgan

Highway system
- Highways in Iran; Freeways

Road 91 is a road in eastern and southern Iran. This road connects Razavi Khorasan to Kerman, Bandarabbas and Jask.
