= Road 98 (Iran) =

Road in Iran

Road 98
- جاده 98
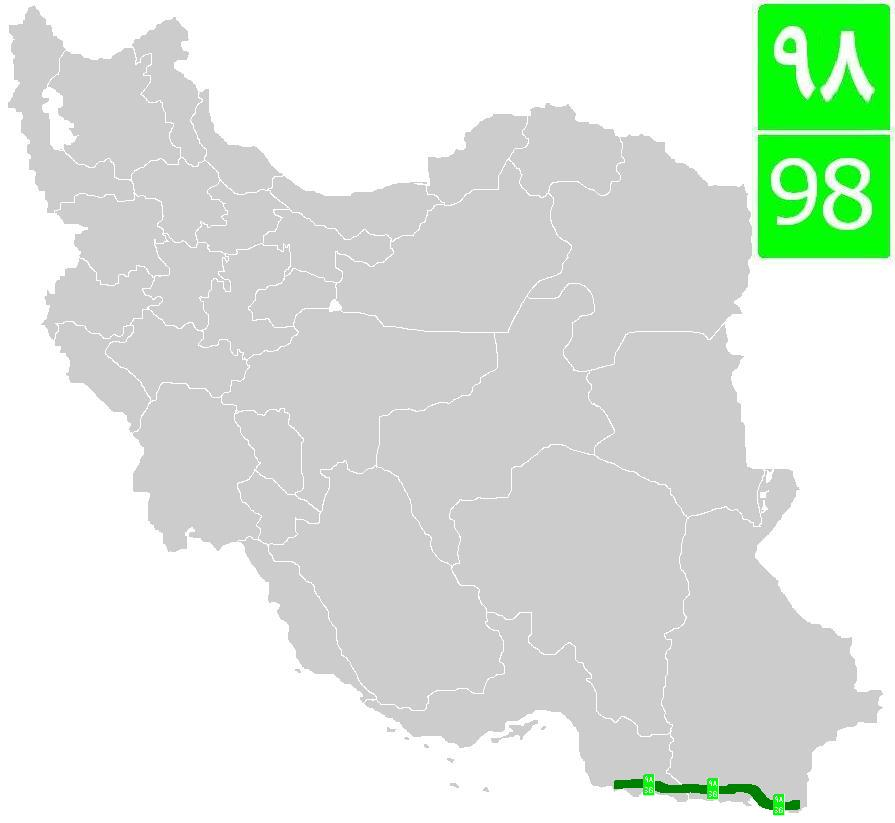

Route information
- Part of AH88
- Length: 493 km (306 mi)

Major junctions
- From: Jask, Hormozgan; Road 91
- To: Guatr, Sistan and Baluchestan

Location
- Country: Iran
- Provinces: Hormozgan, Sistan and Baluchestan
- Major cities: Chabahar, Sistan and Baluchestan

Highway system
- Highways in Iran; Freeways

Road 98 is a road in south-eastern Iran connecting Guatr to Chabahar and Jask and to Bandarabbas via Road 91.
