= AH78 =

Road in Iran and Turkmenistan

Asian Highway 78

Route information
- Length: 1,110 km (690 mi)

Major junctions
- North end: Ashgabat, Turkmenistan
- South end: Kerman, Iran

Location
- Countries: Turkmenistan; Iran

Highway system
- Asian Highway Network
← AH77	→ AH81

Asian Highway 78 (AH78) is a road in the Asian Highway Network running 1110 km (690 miles) from Ashgabat, Turkmenistan to Kerman, Iran. The route is as follows:

== Turkmenistan ==
- Ashgabat - Chovdoan Pass

== Iran ==
- Road 875: Bajgiran - Quchan - Sabzevar
- Road 87: Sabzevar - Bajestan
- Road 91: Bajestan - Ferdows - Kerman
