= Mishan-e Olya, Chaharmahal and Bakhtiari =

Mishan-e Olya ميشان عليا
- Village
- Location within Iran
- Coordinates: 31°18′49″N 51°12′48″E
- Country: Iran
- Province: Chaharmahal and Bakhtiari
- County: Lordegan
- Bakhsh: Falard
- Rural District: Falard

Population (2006)
  - Total: 555
- Time zone: UTC+3:30 (IRST)
  - Summer (DST): UTC+4:30 (IRDT)

Mishan-e Olya (Persian: ميشان عليا, also Romanized as Mīshān-e ‘Olyā; also known as Mīshān-e Bālā) is a village in Falard Rural District, Falard District, Lordegan County, Chaharmahal and Bakhtiari Province, Iran. At the 2006 census, its population was 555, in 99 families. The village is populated by Lurs.
