= Mishan-e Sofla, Chaharmahal and Bakhtiari =

Mishan-e Sofla ميشان سفلي
- Village
- Location within Iran
- Coordinates: 31°18′22″N 51°13′17″E
- Country: Iran
- Province: Chaharmahal and Bakhtiari
- County: Lordegan
- Bakhsh: Falard
- Rural District: Falard

Population (2006)
  - Total: 411
- Time zone: UTC+3:30 (IRST)
  - Summer (DST): UTC+4:30 (IRDT)

Mishan-e Sofla (Persian: ميشان سفلي, also Romanized as Mīshān-e Soflá and Mīshān Soflá; also known as Mīshān and Mīshān-e Pā’īn) is a village in Falard Rural District, Falard District, Lordegan County, Chaharmahal and Bakhtiari Province, Iran. At the 2006 census, its population was 411, in 72 families. The village is populated by Lurs.
