= Neyriz =

City in Fars province, Iran

Neyriz Persian: نی‌ریز
- City

- Location within Iran
- Coordinates: 29°11′34″N 54°19′11″E
- Country: Iran
- Province: Fars
- County: Neyriz
- District: Central

Population (2016)
  - Total: 49,850
- Time zone: UTC+3:30 (IRST)
- Area code: 071
- Website: www.zoomit.ir%20en

Neyriz (Persian: نی‌ریز) (Note: Also Romanized as Neyrīz and Nīrīz) is a city in the Central District of Neyriz County, Fars province, Iran, serving as capital of both the county and the district.

The name is also used for the district in which it is situated and for Bakhtegan Lake. The town was located on its shores, but because of the shrinkage of the salt lake it is now to its southeast. In the nineteenth century some of the Neyriz inhabitants were Bábís, and were persecuted by the government.

In 2010, construction of the Neyriz Ghadir Steel Complex began in Neyriz. The DRI plant came online in 2018 as part of Iran's seven major steel production development program.

== History ==
Neyriz is mentioned in the Persepolis Administrative Archives of the Achaemenid Empire under the Elamite name Narezzash, which reflects its Old Persian name Narēcha. The city was known for its armorers, which has been connected to the historical evidence of iron mining in the region. The Persian King Cambyses II has also been said to have been buried here. However, no direct archaeological evidence of the Achaemenid city has been found.

The 10th-century writer al-Muqaddasi described the great mosque of Neyriz as laying on the same street as the town's marketplace. The mosque was dedicated in the year 951. During this period, Neyriz was protected by a formidable castle, and it belonged to the district of Darabjird. The main route connecting Fars with Kerman at the time bypassed Neyriz, instead travelling through the nearby city of Khayrah on the way to Chahak. An alternate route, however, branched off at Khayrah and passed through Neyriz, eventually rejoining the main highway at the town of Bimand, west of Sirjan. Among the notable inhabitants of the city were the 10th-century astronomer-mathematician Abu'l-Abbās Fazl b. Ḥātem Neyrizi and the 13th-century master calligrapher Mirza Ahmad Neyrizi.

On 27 May 1850, Sayyed Yahya Darabi arrived in Neyriz to great fanfare, entered the Great Mosque, and proclaimed the coming of the Bāb as the chosen one of Islam. Darabi, who had been a Muslim cleric prior to converting to Bābism, was also known as Wahid, meaning "unique", a name the Bāb had bestowed upon him. Fearing that Darabi would lead a Bābi uprising against him, governor of Neyriz, Haji Zayn al-Abedin Khan, recruited a local militia of 1,000 men to crack down on him and his followers. A standoff followed, with the governor's militia occupying the bazaar quarter and the Bābis holding the Chenār-sūkhta quarter around the mosque. The Bābis defeated the governor's forces in several skirmishes, and he retreated to the nearby village of Qotra. Zayn al-Abedin Khan sent for reinforcements from Shiraz, receiving three infantry regiments along with cavalry and artillery. These forces were also defeated in a pitched battle that lasted eight hours. After this, Zayn al-Abedin Khan offered Darabi and his followers safe passage home, but when they came out from their fort, they were captured and killed.

Two years later, in 1852, Ali Sardar had emerged as the new leader of the Bābis in Neyriz. Fearing a new wave of persecution, a group of Bābis assassinated the governor at the public bath, despite such an action being forbidden by Bābi teachings. When a new governor arrived, the Bābis of Neyriz failed to win his trust, and they fled into the mountains to the south for protection, carrying provisions for several months. The governor recruited as many as 12,000 troops and besieged the Bābis' positions. Ali Sardar was killed in a failed sortie by late October 1853. Eventually, the dropping temperatures and waning food supplies forced the Bābis to surrender. 450 to 500 adult prisoners, including around 300 women, as well as an unknown number of children, were taken prisoner and deported to Shiraz.

== Demographics ==
=== Population ===
At the time of the 2006 National Census, the city's population was 45,180 in 11,970 households. The following census in 2011 counted 50,291 people in 14,416 households. The 2024 census measured the population of the city as 110,850 people in 31,338 households.

== Climate ==
Neyriz has a hot semi-arid climate (BSh) according to the Köppen climate classification.

Climate data for Neyriz (2000-2005)
Month	Jan	Feb	Mar	Apr	May	Jun	Jul	Aug	Sep	Oct	Nov	Dec	Year
Daily mean °C (°F)	7.3 (45.1)	9.9 (49.8)	14.0 (57.2)	19.1 (66.4)	23.9 (75.0)	28.3 (82.9)	30.6 (87.1)	29.7 (85.5)	26.1 (79.0)	20.7 (69.3)	13.8 (56.8)	9.7 (49.5)	19.4 (67.0)
Average precipitation mm (inches)	66.9 (2.63)	23.6 (0.93)	25.4 (1.00)	11.1 (0.44)	0.5 (0.02)	0.6 (0.02)	3.4 (0.13)	2.1 (0.08)	0.0 (0.0)	0.7 (0.03)	9.2 (0.36)	61.4 (2.42)	204.9 (8.06)
Source: IRIMO

== Historical places ==
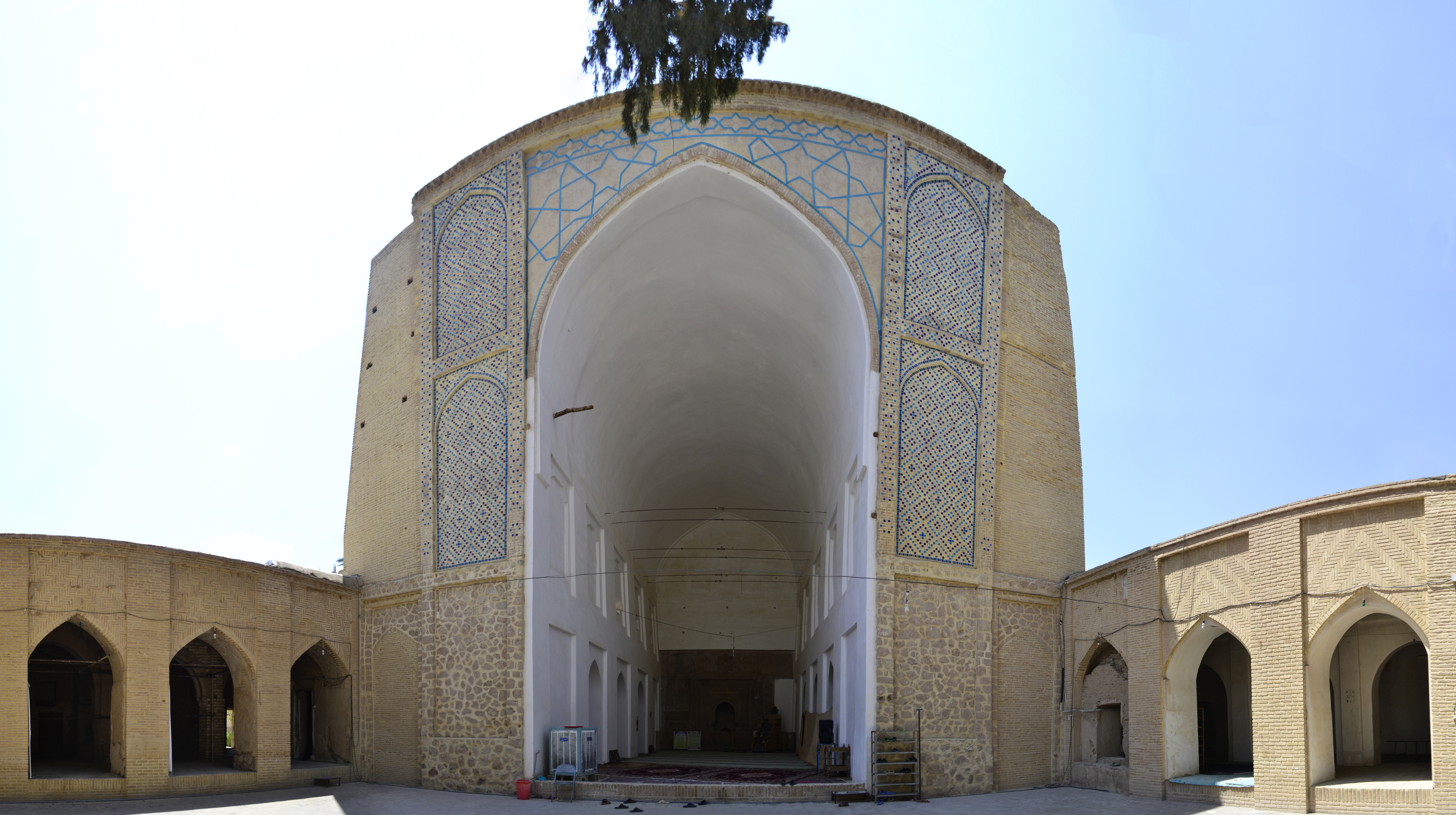
The Great Mosque of Neyriz

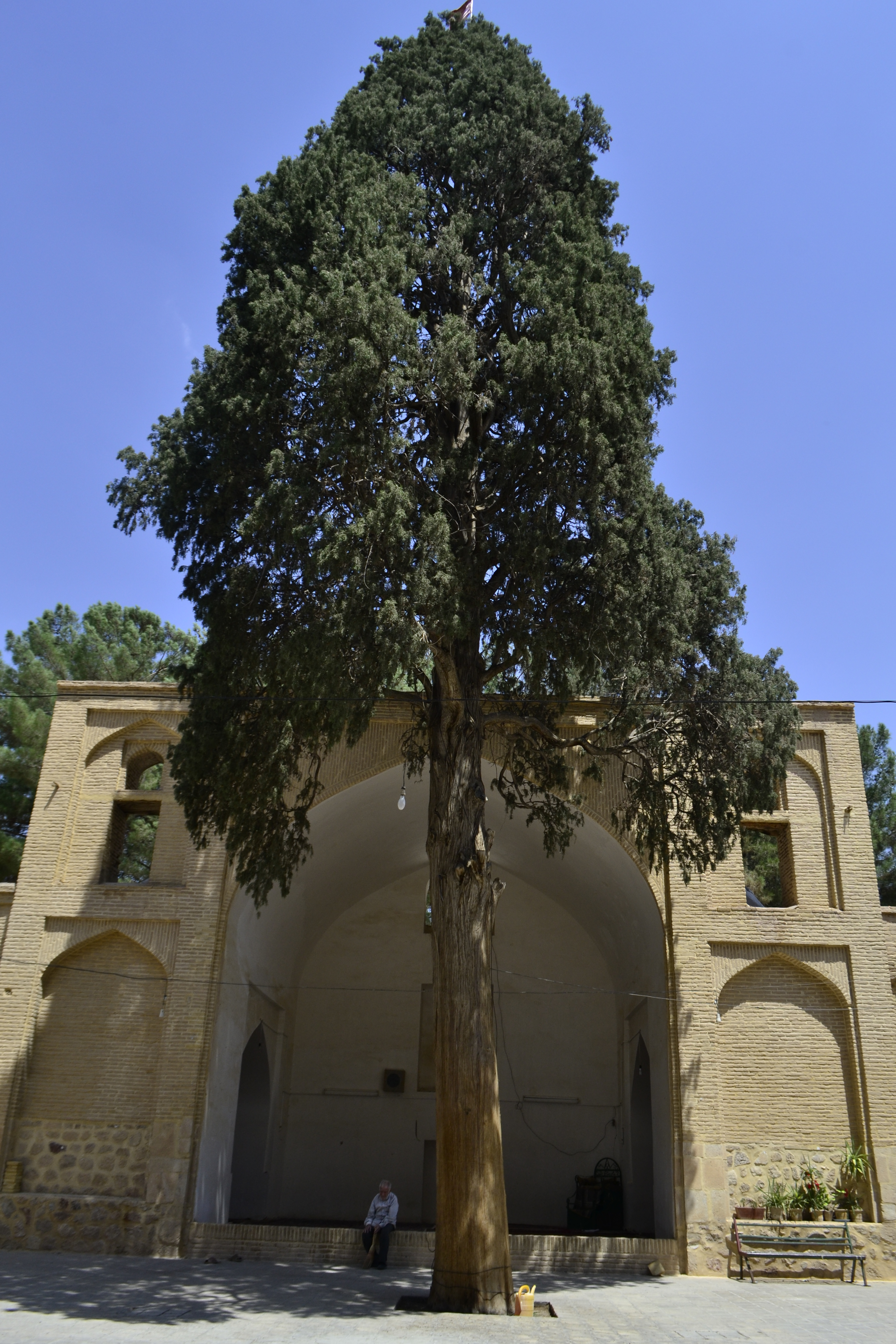
The Great Mosque of Neyriz

== Attractions ==
=== Tarm waterfall ===
Tarm is one of the highest waterfalls in the Middle East and is a season waterfall.

=== Friday mosque ===
The Friday mosque of Neyriz was built in at least three phases, spanning Buyid, Seljuk and Il-Khanid rule in the Fars province. An inscription on the great qibla iwan indicates that the mihrab was built in 973, which is probably the date when the qibla iwan and the minaret were constructed and enclosed within the precinct walls. Identified as "iwan-mosque," the pre-Islamic typology of the Masjid-i Jami' in Neyriz, Bamiyan and Nishapur has led some scholars to believe that their mihrabs and minarets may have been appended to Zoroastrian fire temples. At Neyriz, the northwest iwan facing the original sanctuary was erected at a later date, followed by the addition of two rows of lateral arcades along the courtyard and iwan walls. The portal, which bears the date 1472, commemorates the last known period of construction.

The mosque has a rectangular layout, measuring about forty-eight by thirty-four metres on the exterior. It is aligned with qibla along the northwest–southeast axis and is centred on an arcaded courtyard that is fifteen metres long and eighteen and a half metres wide. Entered from a simple portal at the northern end of the northwest façade, the courtyard is dominated by the tall sanctuary iwan that occupies its southwest wing. Eleven metres wide and seventeen metres deep, the sanctuary iwan is vaulted at a height double that of the flat-roofed courtyard arcades that continue along its side walls. The archways connecting the iwan to the arcades were pierced when the latter were constructed. The sanctuary iwan also dominates the exterior appearance of the mosque with its projecting buttresses.

Across the courtyard from the sanctuary is the vaulted northeast iwan, which is seven metres square. It is flanked by passageways on either side that connect it with the main portal and the secondary portal, which was added to the eastern corner of the mosque in 1472. It is adjoined by the modern addition of two halls that span the length of the southeast mosque wall; the southern of these halls contains ablution fountains and latrines. There's also an octagonal fountain at the center of the courtyard. A single minaret, with a round tapering shaft terminating at a parapet, rises alongside the main portal. The spiraling steps of the minaret are accessed from the northwest arcade.

The mosque is made of baked bricks, covered with clay on the exterior and plastered white on the interior. The courtyard façade of the great iwan is simply ornamented with polychrome tiles composed into geometric patterns. Inside, the decorative effort is focused on the mihrab niche on the qibla wall, which is framed with multiple bands of ornate arabesques and inscriptions carved in relief out of stucco. The original minbar, probably wooden, has since been replaced.

=== Palangan ===
Palangan is a valley located in the south of the city, separated by a mountain. From the city center, Palangan is a 45 to 60 minutes trip. The valley is especially popular in spring and summer and is a wonderful promenade for people who live in this part of the world, especially during the 13 be-dar ceremony.

Palangan means "panthers"; in the past, many Iranian tigers lived in the region, but today only a few remain. The spring of the stream that flows through the valley is named Besher and is located two hours from Palangan.

== Gallery ==
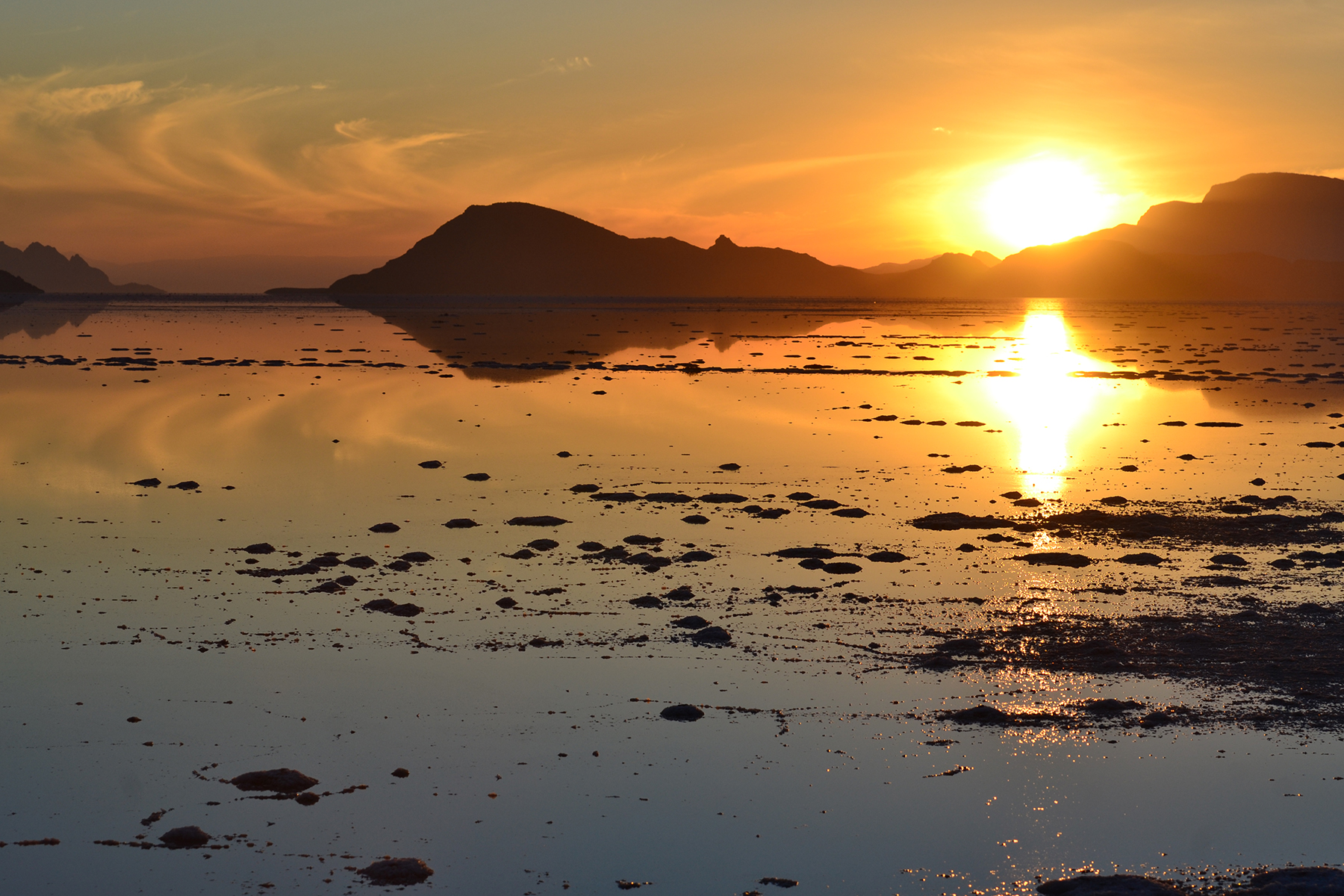

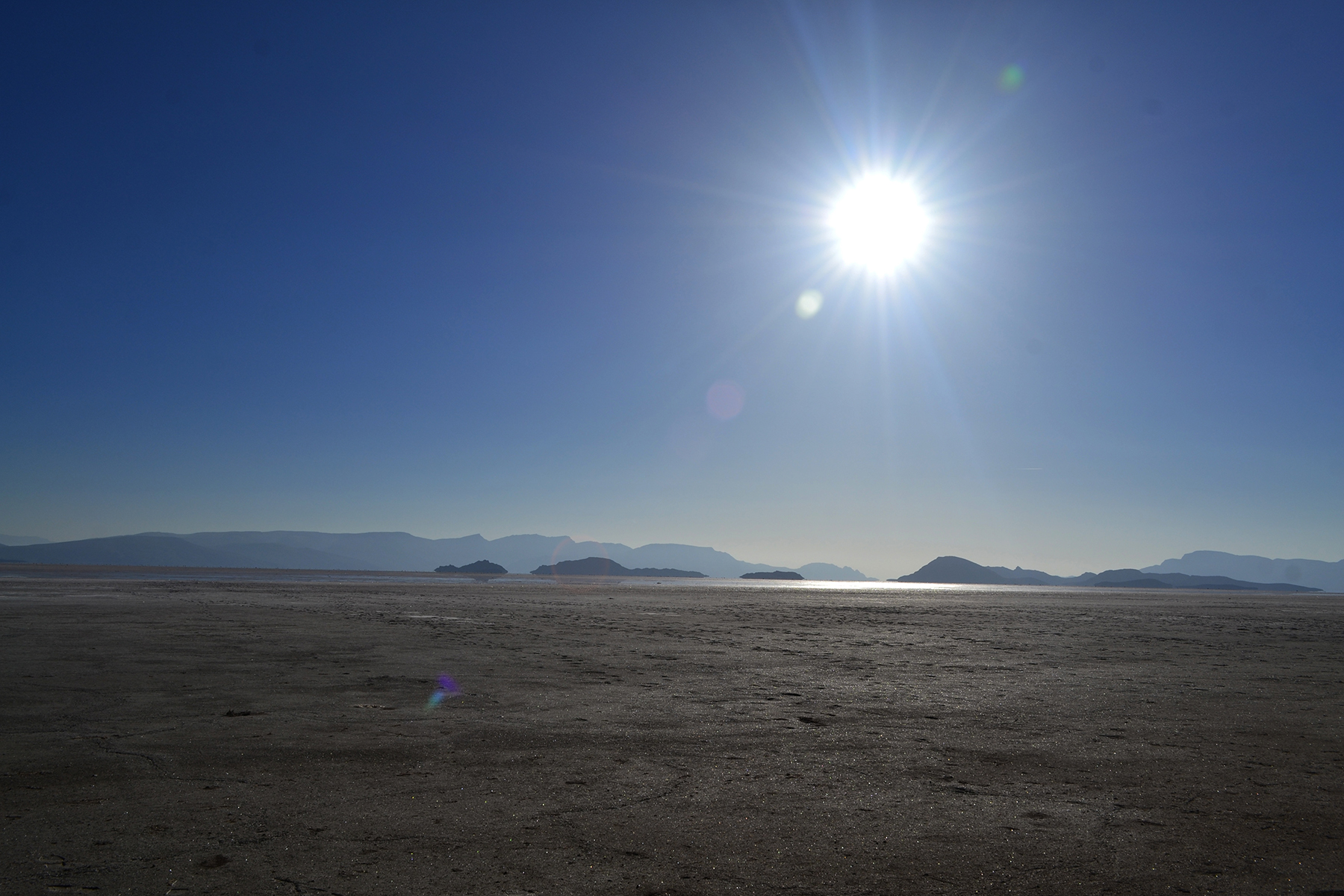

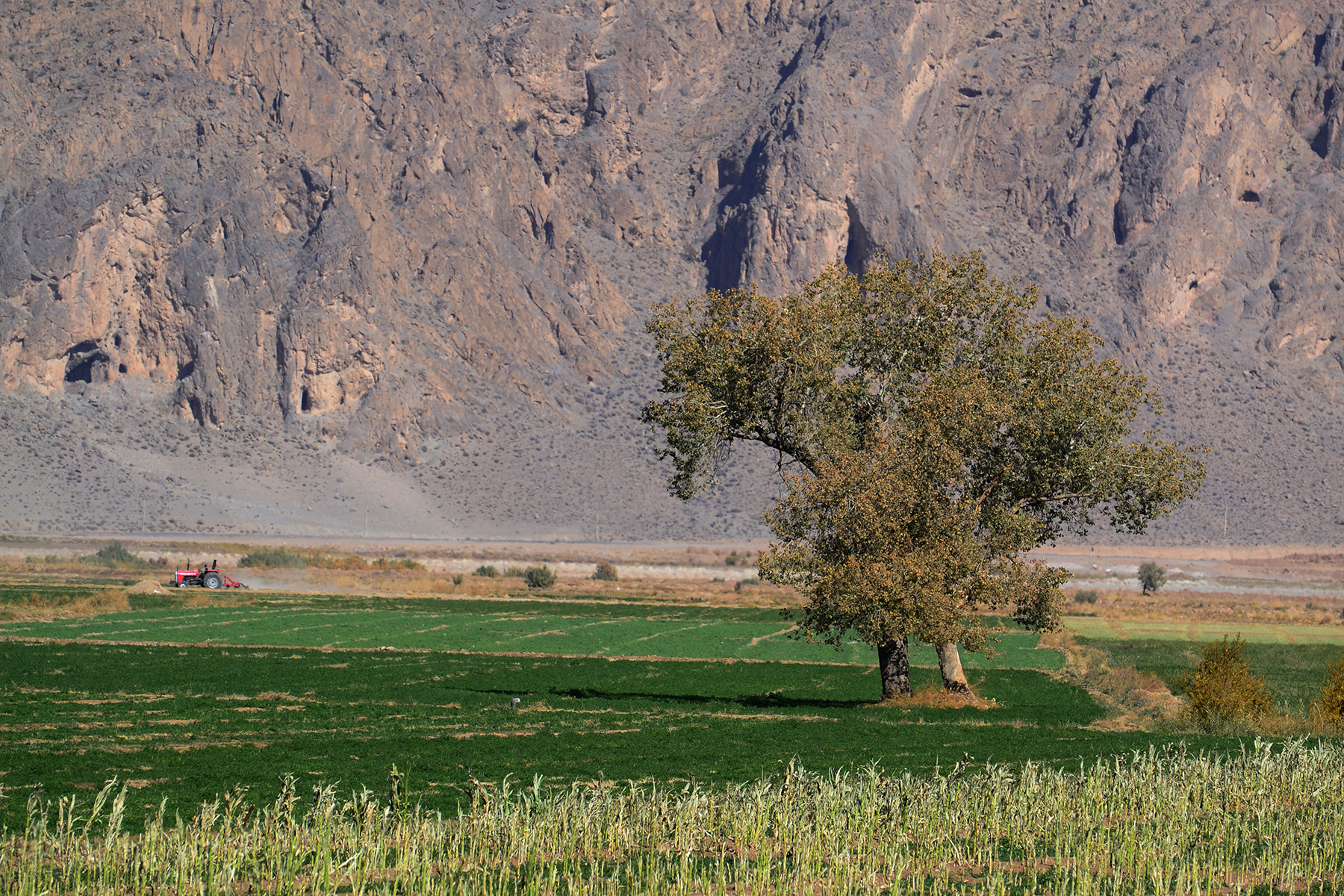

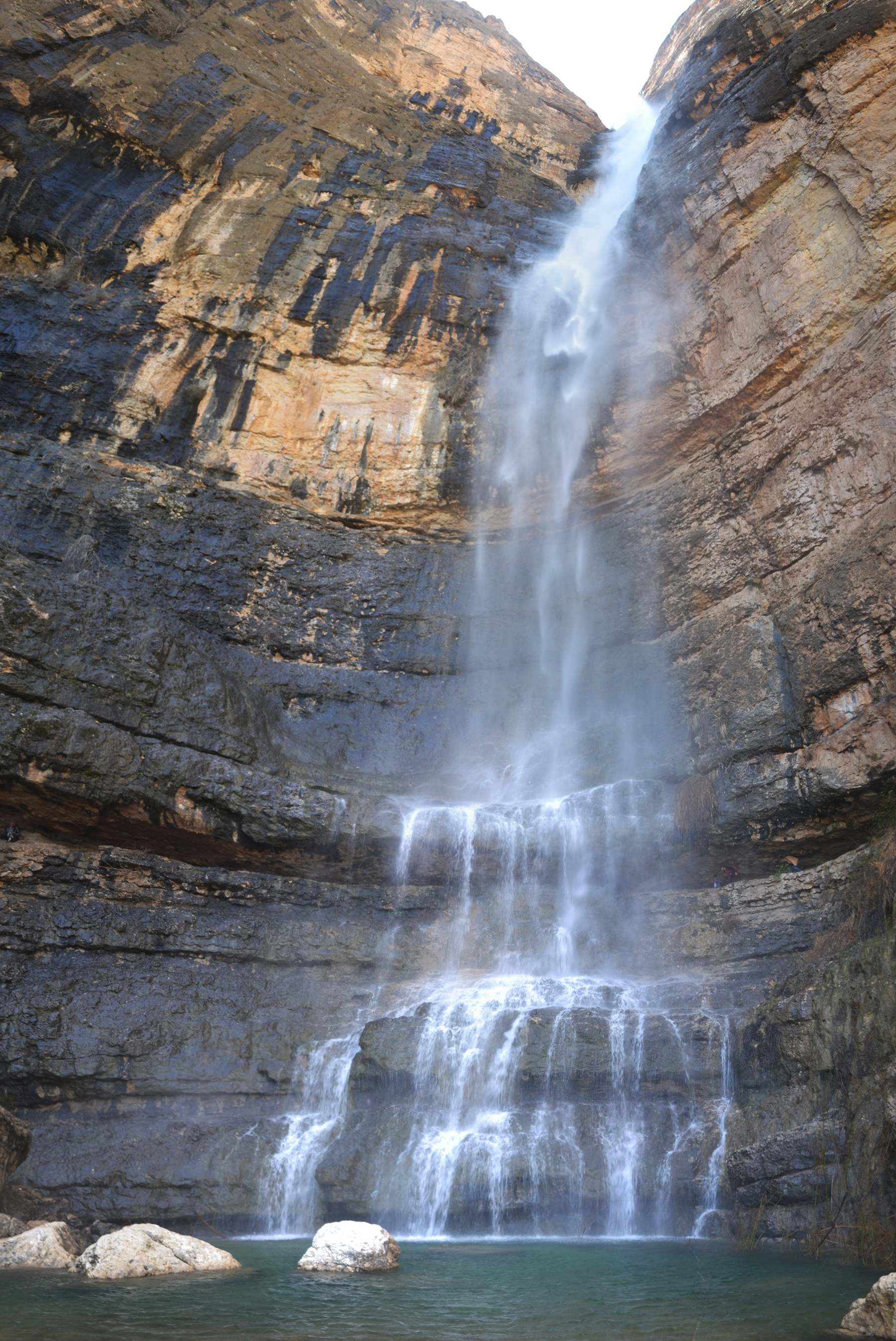

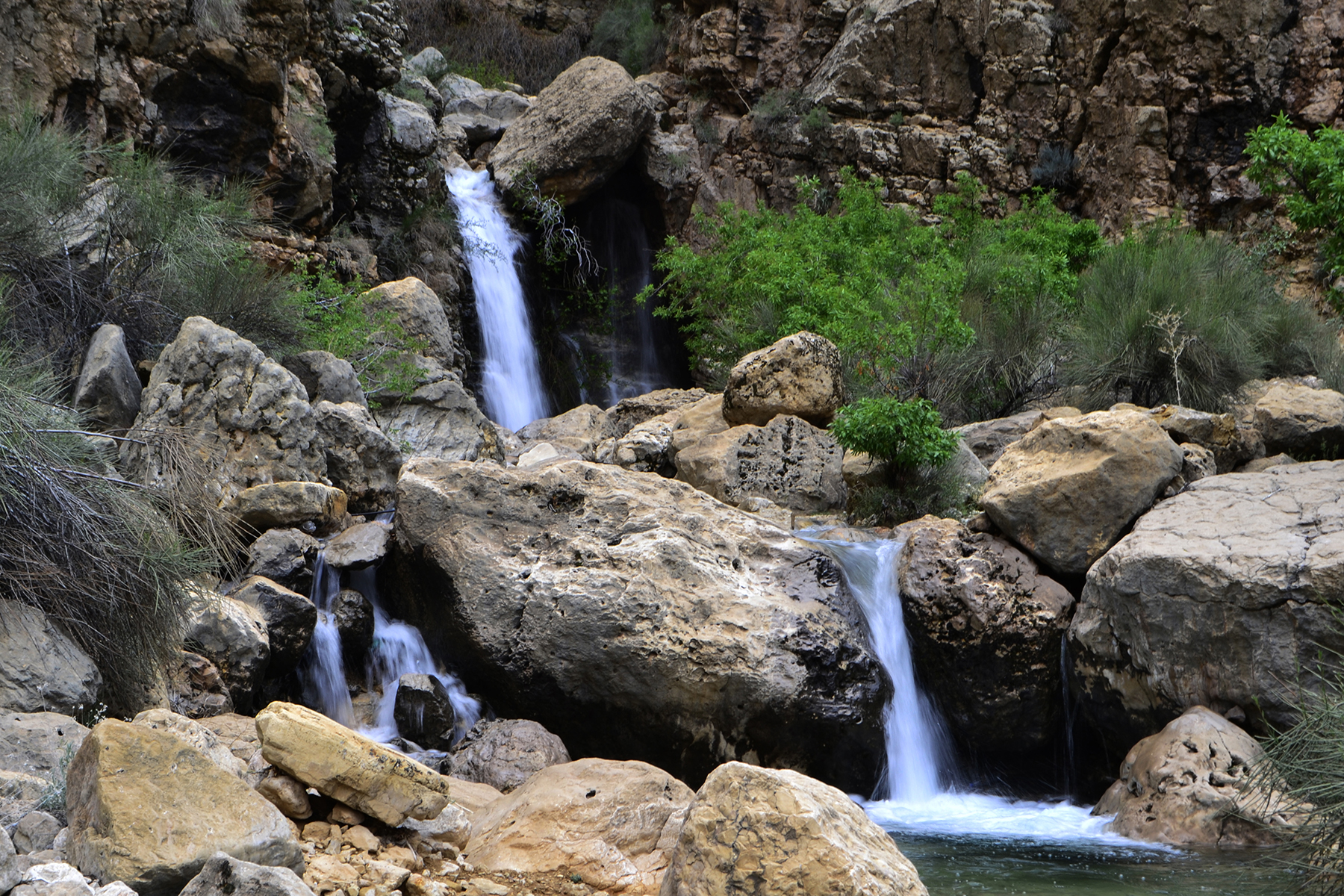

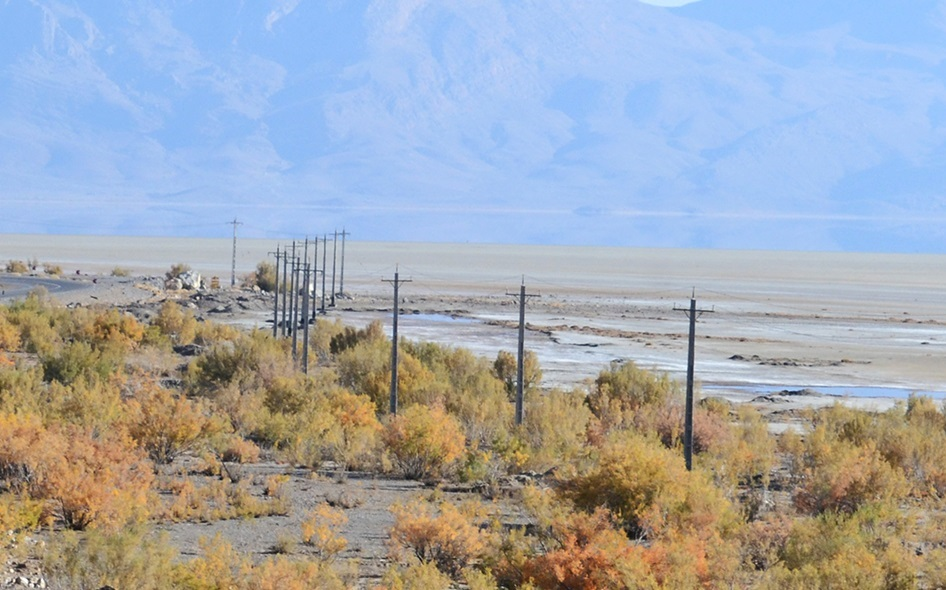

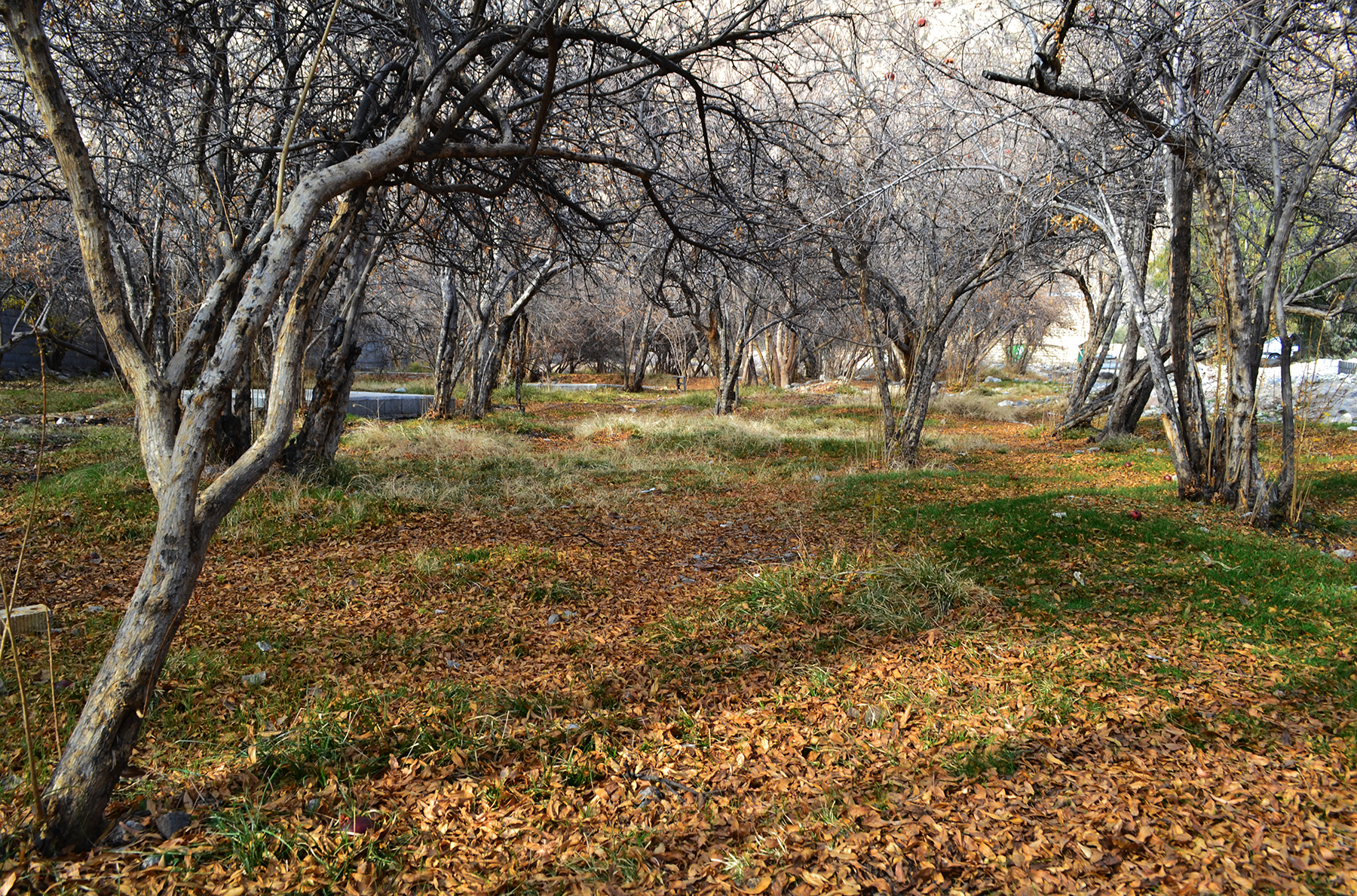

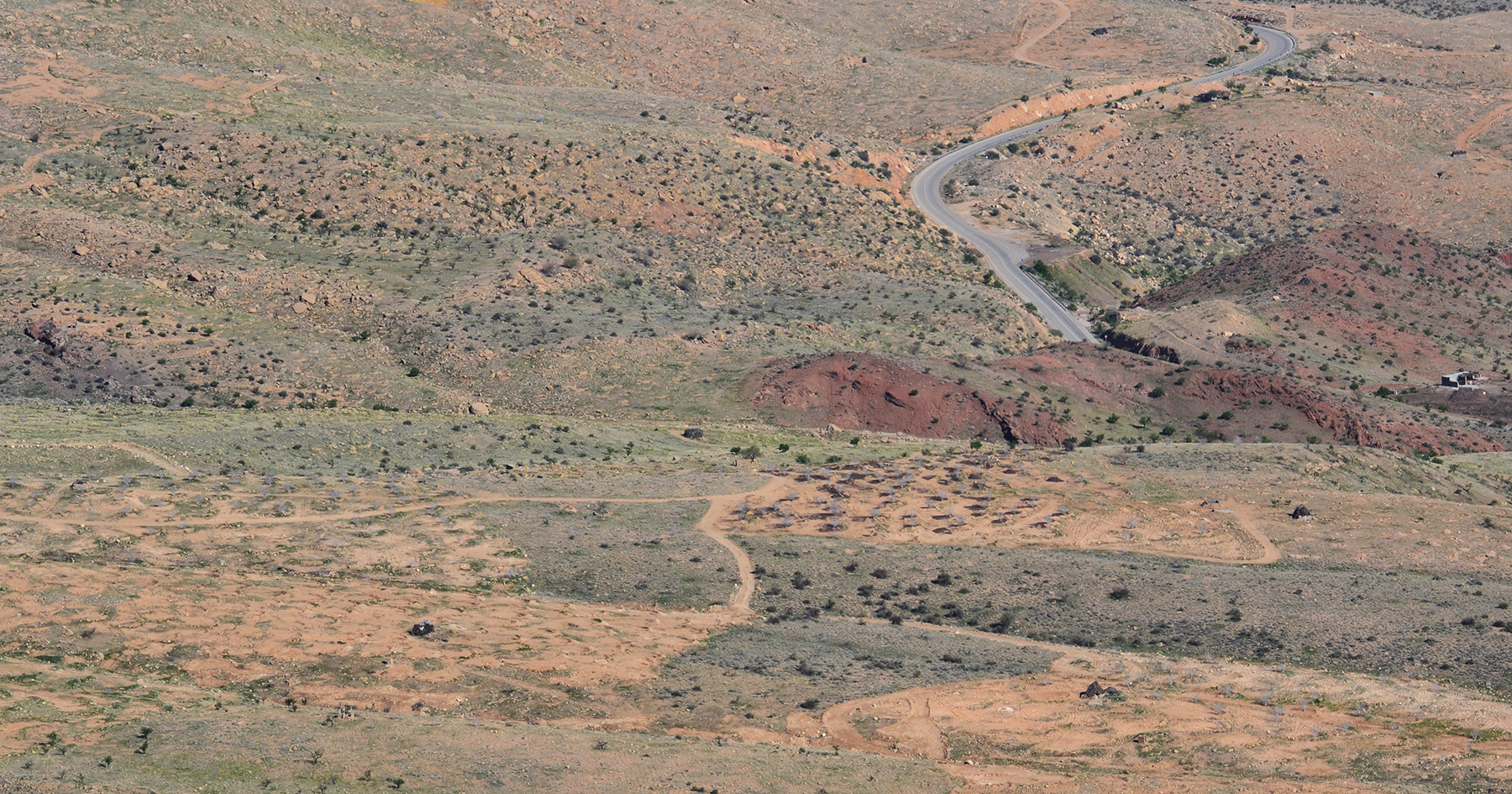

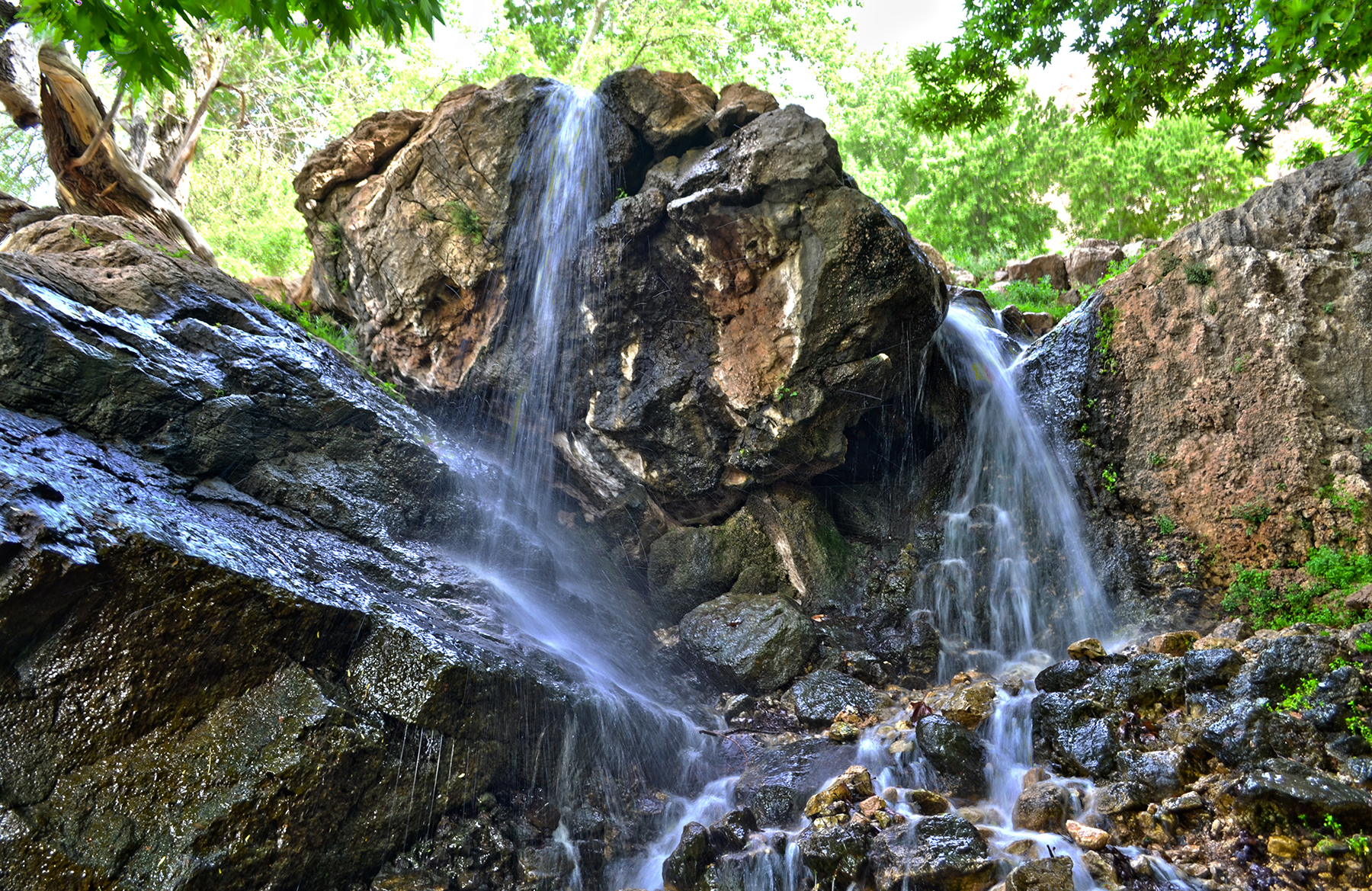

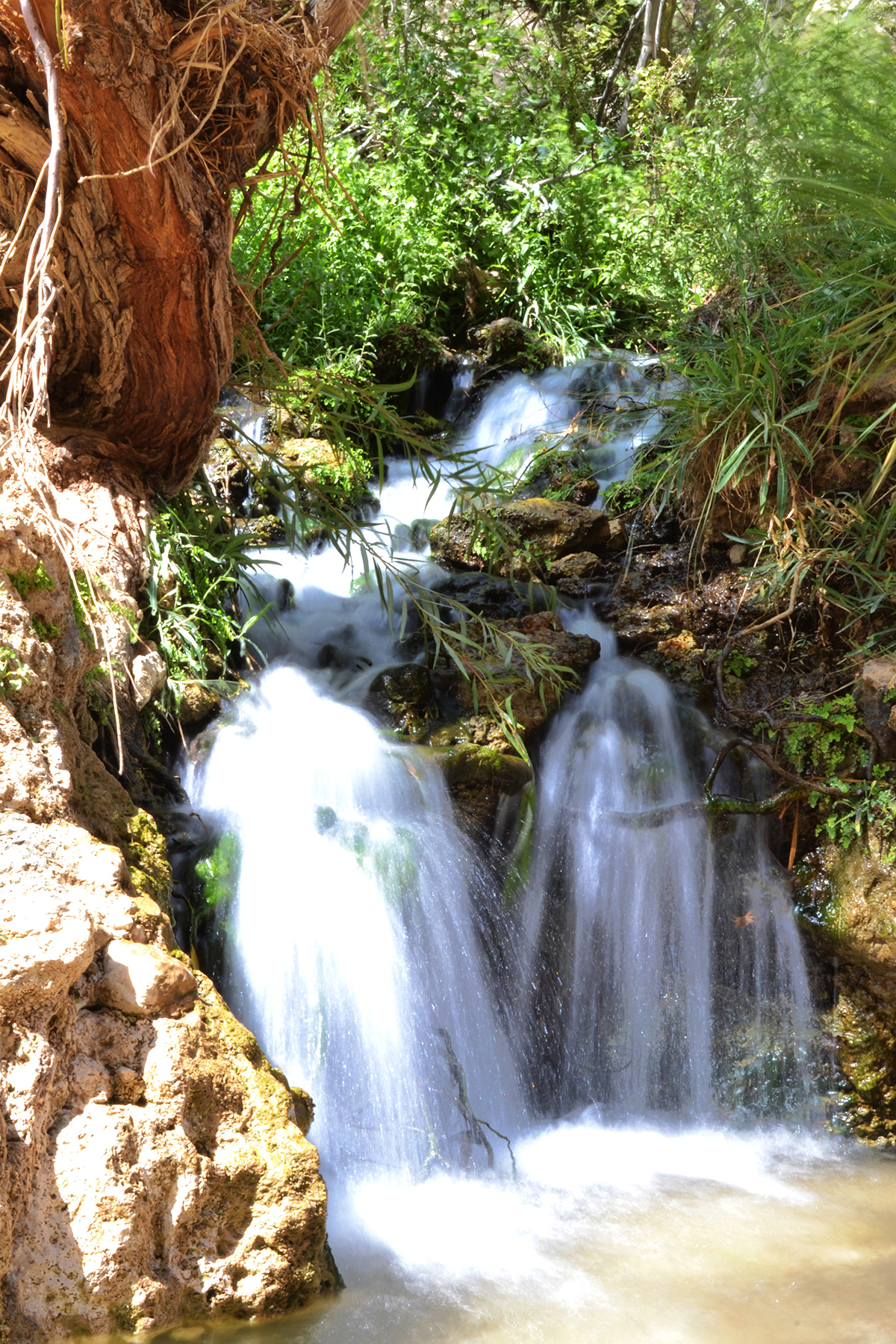

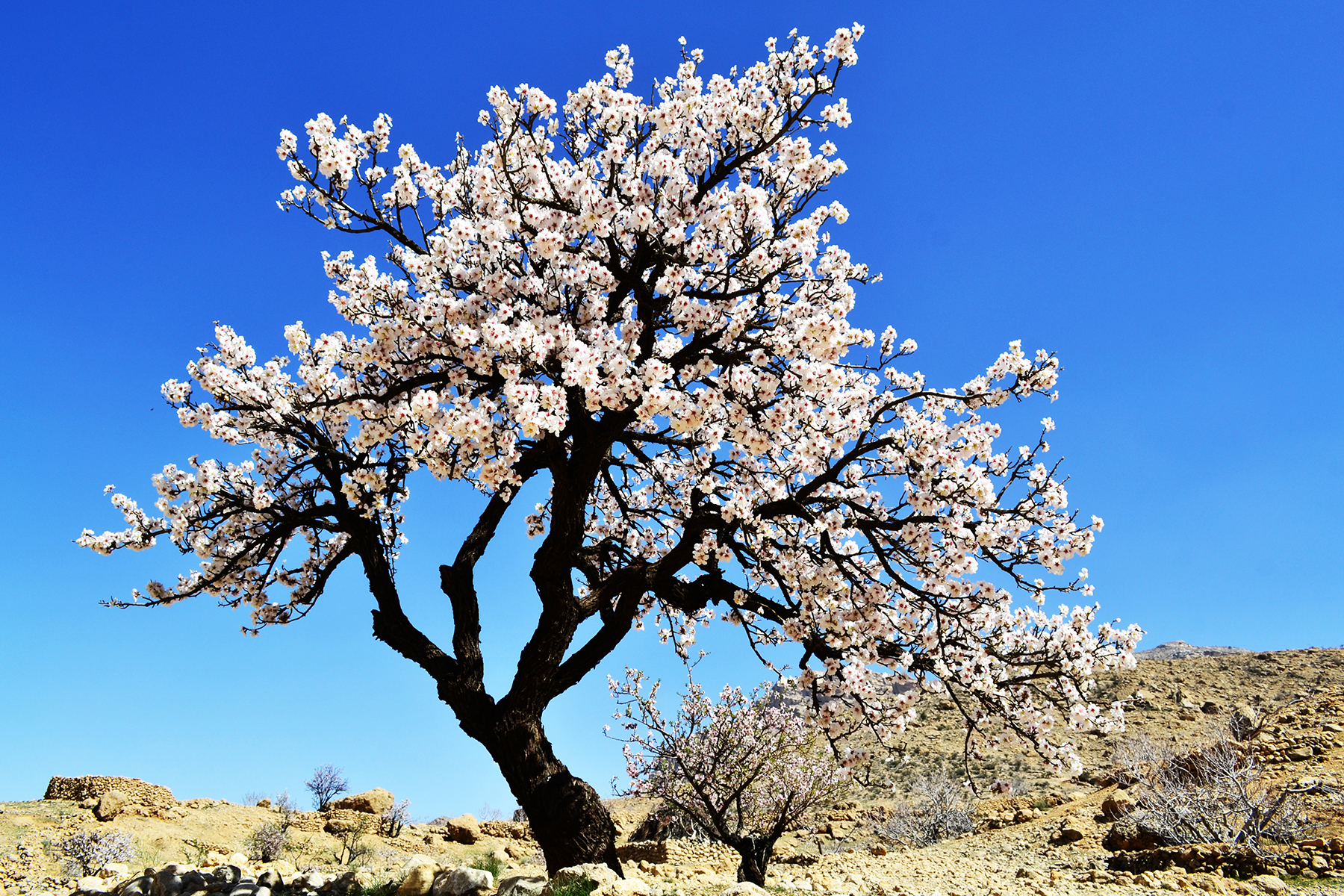

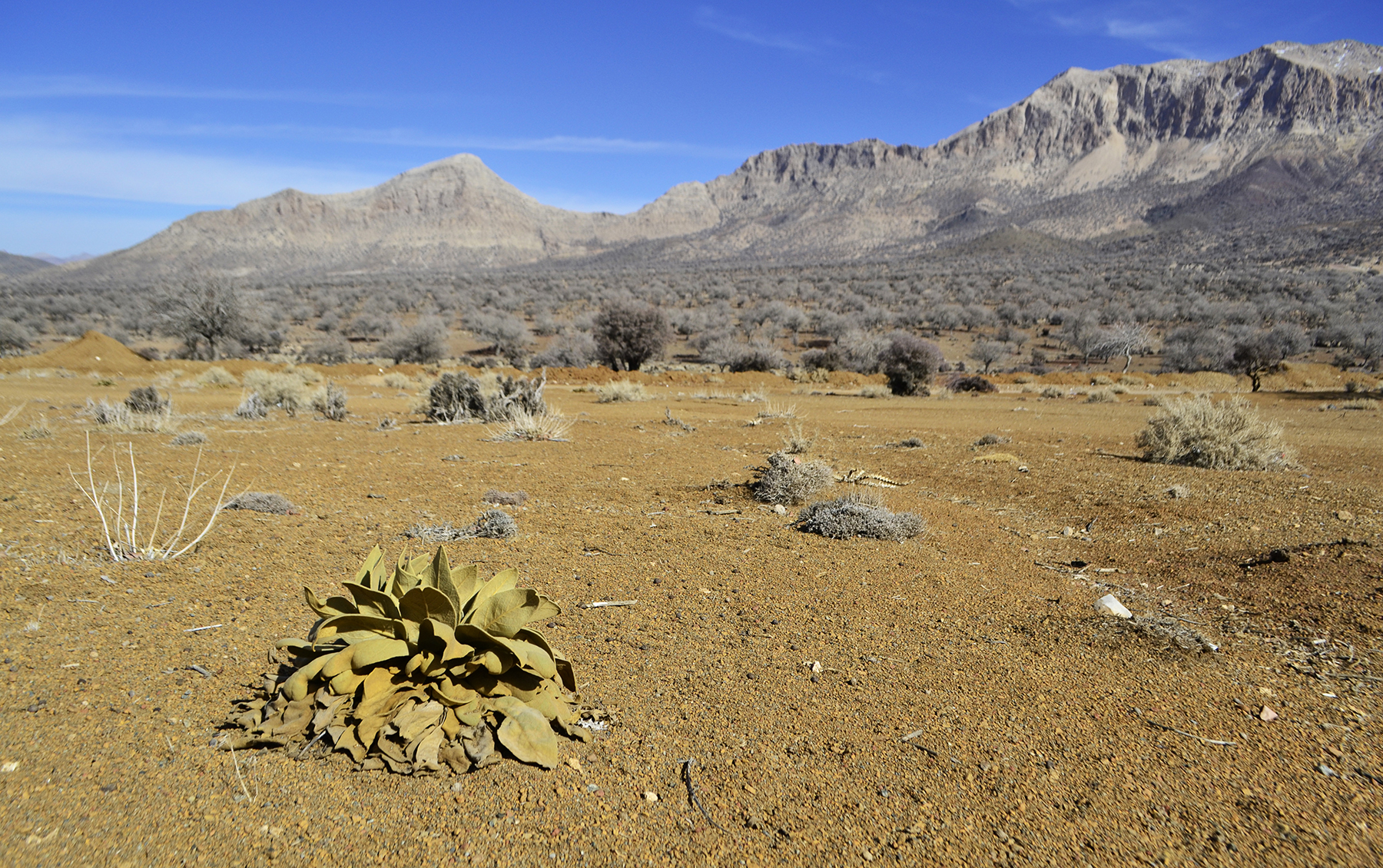

== Sources ==
- Sumner, W.M. (January 1986). "Achaemenid Settlement in the Persepolis Plain". American Journal of Archaeology. 90 (1): 3–31. doi:10.2307/505980. JSTOR 505980. S2CID 191382637.
- Tavernier, Jan (2007). Iranica in the Achaemenid Period (ca. 550-330 B.C.). Leuven: Peeters. ISBN 9789042918337. OCLC 167407632.
