= Jask =

City in Hormozgan province, Iran

Jask Persian: جاسک
- City
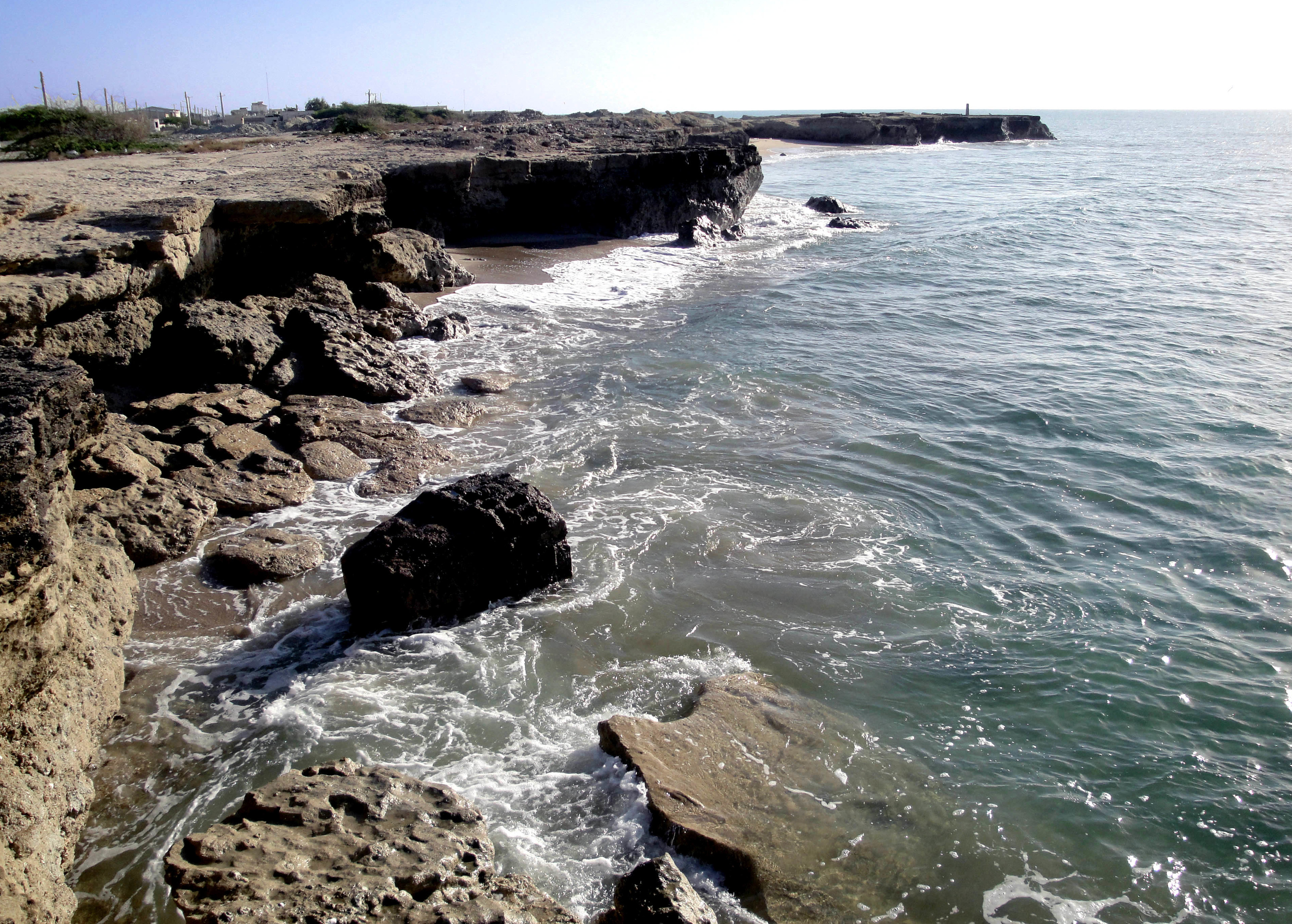
- Cape of Jask

- Location within Iran
- Coordinates: 25°39′11″N 57°46′54″E
- Country: Iran
- Province: Hormozgan
- County: Jask
- District: Central

Population (2016)
  - Total: 16,860
- Time zone: UTC+3:30 (IRST)

Jask (Persian: جاسک and Balochi: جاشک) (Note: Also romanized as Jāsk; also known as Bandar-e Jask (بَندَرِ جاسک) and (Balochi: بندن ءِ جاشک); also romanized as Bandar-e Jāsk) is a city in the Central District of Jask County, Hormozgan province, Iran, serving as capital of both the county and the district.

== Demographics ==
=== Population ===
At the time of the 2006 National Census, the city's population was 11,133 in 2,406 households. The following census in 2011 counted 13,810 people in 2,958 households. The 2016 census measured the population of the city as 16,860 people in 4,415 households.

Jask is a port town, about 1,690 kilometres (1,050 mi) south of Tehran, situated on the Gulf of Oman. It is the site of an Iranian Navy base that opened on 28 October 2008. Prior to the 2026 Iran war, the base's position ostensibly provided the Iranian Navy with a capability to close the Strait of Hormuz in order to block the entry of an "enemy" into the Persian Gulf. Admiral Habibollah Sayyari remarked on the base's opening in 2008 that Iran was "creating a new defense front in the region, thinking of a non-regional enemy."

The port of Jask was also the proposed terminus of the Neka-Jask pipeline. The city also has the Jask Airport.

== Port of Jask ==
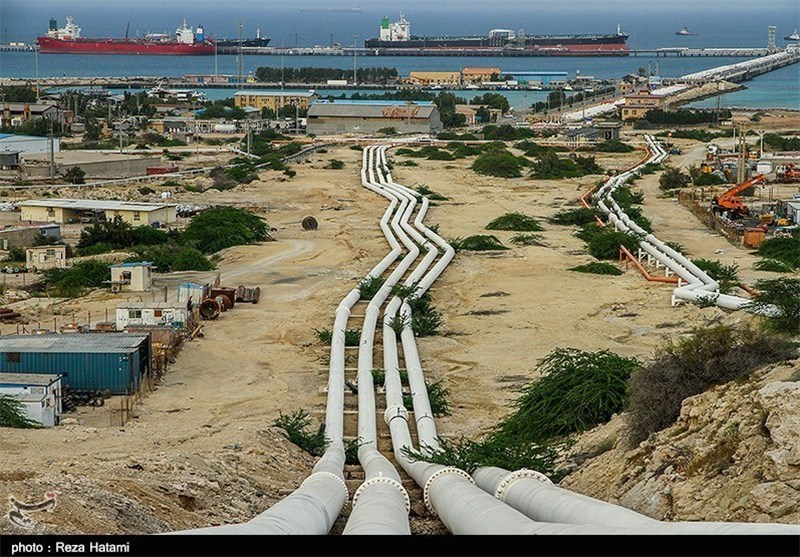

The port of Jask is a small port on the western part of Iran's coast along the Gulf of Oman. However, in the late 2010s it has seen steady growth of its export freight flows to Oman, mostly agricultural products, including refrigerated, and construction materials.

Major developments for the port of Jask were announced by Iranian authorities in early 2019, i.e. the construction of a new terminal for oil tankers for a total investment of US$700 million, to be followed by the construction of a refinery and of a petrochemical plant. These developments were part of a total investment of US$1.8 billion centered on the construction of a new oil pipeline from Goreh, Bushehr to Jask in order to pump and export oil from Northern Iran. When these investments are completed in Jask, they will contribute to developing Iran's southern regional economy, as is already the case further east at Chabahar Port, and to facilitating exports through ports which do not require ships to enter the Persian Gulf through the Hormuz Strait. The pipeline began exporting oil from Jask in October 2024. It has a design capacity of 1 million barrels per day (MBPD), but a more likely useable capacity is 0.3 MBPD - however, actual sendings are likely much lower, and cannot replace Kharg Island.

Outside the port is a single buoy mooring to offload oil into tankers, however it is rarely used.

In July 2026, media reported that a service member from the Islamic Republic of Iran Navy was killed in a US attack in Jask port during the US-Iran war.

== History ==
=== 1600-2000 ===
The English people made Jask their primary commercial port in the 17th century, and in 1616 AD, an East India Company ship carrying their first shipment sailed from India and arrived at Jask. English businessmen founded the first East India Company trading post in Jask in the year 1619. Jask served as the East India Company's hub for trade and transactions with the Iranian central region up until Bandar Abbas was given responsibility for English trade. The English and Portuguese engaged in a bloody battle that ended with the Portuguese being defeated and driven from Jask in the late 1620s after the Portuguese blocked two East India Company ships from entering the port.

=== 2001-present ===
By 2013, the Islamic Revolutionary Guard Corps Navy had established a naval base at Jask. In January 2025, they announced that they planned to establish electronic warfare units in the port of Jask.

On 12 May 2026 during the 2026 Iran war, the Iranian Revolutionary Guard Corps Navy announced a greatly expanded definition of the Strait of Hormuz stretching hundreds of kilometers from Jask to Greater Tunb Island in the north.

== Language ==
The linguistic composition of the city:

Jask linguistic composition
Language	percent
Balochi	70%
Bandari Farsi	25%
New Persian	5%

== Climate ==
Jask has a hot desert climate (Köppen climate classification BWh), with very hot summers, warm winters and little precipitation. Due to winds blowing off the Persian Gulf and Gulf of Oman, the city has experienced some of the highest dew points and heat indices in the world. On July 31, 2015, Jask observed a temperature of 39.0 °C (102.2 °F) degrees with a dew point of 33.0 °C (91.4 °F), leading to a heat index of 69 °C (156 °F). On July 20, 2012, Jask experienced a dew point temperature of 35 °C (95 °F).

Climate data for Jask (1991–2020)
Month	Jan	Feb	Mar	Apr	May	Jun	Jul	Aug	Sep	Oct	Nov	Dec	Year
Record high °C (°F)	29.0 (84.2)	31.3 (88.3)	35.0 (95.0)	39.0 (102.2)	44.8 (112.6)	47.2 (117.0)	43.0 (109.4)	42.0 (107.6)	42.0 (107.6)	43.8 (110.8)	39.0 (102.2)	30.6 (87.1)	47.2 (117.0)
Mean daily maximum °C (°F)	23.8 (74.8)	24.6 (76.3)	26.7 (80.1)	30.3 (86.5)	33.7 (92.7)	34.8 (94.6)	33.8 (92.8)	32.9 (91.2)	32.6 (90.7)	31.9 (89.4)	28.7 (83.7)	25.7 (78.3)	30.0 (86.0)
Daily mean °C (°F)	21.1 (70.0)	22.0 (71.6)	24.1 (75.4)	27.4 (81.3)	30.7 (87.3)	32.5 (90.5)	32.2 (90.0)	31.4 (88.5)	30.6 (87.1)	29.2 (84.6)	25.9 (78.6)	22.7 (72.9)	27.5 (81.5)
Mean daily minimum °C (°F)	17.5 (63.5)	18.8 (65.8)	21.0 (69.8)	24.4 (75.9)	27.6 (81.7)	30.0 (86.0)	30.7 (87.3)	29.8 (85.6)	28.5 (83.3)	26.2 (79.2)	22.4 (72.3)	19.1 (66.4)	24.7 (76.5)
Record low °C (°F)	6.0 (42.8)	8.0 (46.4)	13.0 (55.4)	14.0 (57.2)	20.0 (68.0)	18.0 (64.4)	22.0 (71.6)	20.0 (68.0)	22.0 (71.6)	18.0 (64.4)	13.0 (55.4)	9.0 (48.2)	6.0 (42.8)
Average precipitation mm (inches)	32.0 (1.26)	9.4 (0.37)	26.8 (1.06)	4.7 (0.19)	0.1 (0.00)	5.4 (0.21)	0.3 (0.01)	0.3 (0.01)	0.0 (0.0)	0.3 (0.01)	8.3 (0.33)	22.4 (0.88)	110.0 (4.33)
Average precipitation days (≥ 1.0 mm)	2.4	1.3	1.9	0.6	0.0	0.1	0.1	0.0	0.0	0.1	0.9	1.9	9.3
Average relative humidity (%)	63	65	69	68	69	73	80	81	78	71	64	61	70
Mean monthly sunshine hours	244	230	246	281	321	281	223	241	265	289	269	261	3,151
Source 1: NOAA NCEI
Source 2: Iran Meteorological Organization (records)

== See also ==
Media related to Jask at Wikimedia Commons
