= Mishan-e Sofla, Fars =

Mishan-e Sofla ميشان سفلي
- Village
- Location within Iran
- Coordinates: 29°58′36″N 50°58′04″E
- Country: Iran
- Province: Fars
- County: Mamasani
- Bakhsh: Mahvarmilani
- Rural District: Mishan

Population (2006)
  - Total: 327
- Time zone: UTC+3:30 (IRST)
  - Summer (DST): UTC+4:30 (IRDT)

Mishan-e Sofla (Persian: ميشان سفلي, also Romanized as Mīshān-e Soflá; also known as Mishan and Mīshān-e Kūchek) is a village in Mishan Rural District, Mahvarmilani District, Mamasani County, Fars province, Iran. At the 2006 census, its population was 327, in 75 families.
