= Nik Shahr =

City in Sistan and Baluchestan province, Iran

Nik Shahr نیک‌شهر
- City
- Location within Iran
- Coordinates: 26°13′31″N 60°13′00″E
- Country: Iran
- Province: Sistan and Baluchestan
- County: Nik Shahr
- District: Central

Population (2016)
  - Total: 17,732
- Time zone: UTC+3:30 (IRST)

Nik Shahr (Persian: نیک‌شهر) (Note: Also romanized as Nīk Shahr; also known as Nīk; formerly Geh and Keh) is a city in the Central District of Nik Shahr County, Sistan and Baluchestan province, Iran, serving as capital of both the county and the district. The original name of Nikshahr was Geh.

== Climate ==
Nik Shahr has a hot desert climate (BWh) in the Köppen climate classification.

Climate data for Nik Shahr(2006-2010 normals), elevation: 510.0 m (1,673.2 ft)
Month	Jan	Feb	Mar	Apr	May	Jun	Jul	Aug	Sep	Oct	Nov	Dec	Year
Daily mean °C (°F)	16.8 (62.2)	20.7 (69.3)	24.9 (76.8)	29.8 (85.6)	35.1 (95.2)	35.6 (96.1)	35.2 (95.4)	33.5 (92.3)	32.6 (90.7)	29.9 (85.8)	24.1 (75.4)	19.0 (66.2)	28.1 (82.6)
Average precipitation mm (inches)	58.9 (2.32)	23.8 (0.94)	32.9 (1.30)	3.3 (0.13)	6.2 (0.24)	41.0 (1.61)	6.3 (0.25)	6.2 (0.24)	3.7 (0.15)	0.6 (0.02)	8.6 (0.34)	27.3 (1.07)	218.8 (8.61)
Source: Iran Meteorological Organization (temperatures), (precipitation)

== Demographics ==
=== Population ===
At the time of the 2006 National Census, the city's population was 13,267 in 2,365 households. The following census in 2011 counted 15,889 people in 3,399 households. The 2016 census measured the population of the city as 17,732 people in 4,156 households.
