= Qarah Gol =

Qarah Gol or Qareh Gol (Persian: قره گل) may refer to:

- Qarah Gol, Meshgin Shahr, Ardabil Province
- Qarah Gol, Moradlu, Meshgin Shahr County, Ardabil Province
- Qarah Gol, Charuymaq, East Azerbaijan Province
- Qareh Gol, Malekan, East Azerbaijan Province
- Qareh Gol-e Olya, Fars Province
- Qareh Gol-e Sofla, Fars Province
- Qarah Gol-e Gharbi, Golestan Province
- Qarah Gol-e Kalleh, Golestan Province
- Qarah Gol-e Sharqi, Golestan Province
- Qarah Gol-e Takhteh-ye Vasat, Golestan Province
- Qarah Gol, Kurdistan
- Qarah Gol, Divandarreh, Kurdistan Province
- Qarah Gol, North Khorasan
- Qareh Gol, Razavi Khorasan
- Qarah Gol, Bukan, West Azerbaijan Province
- Qareh Gol, Khoy, West Azerbaijan Province
- Qarah Gol, Khodabandeh, Zanjan Province
- Qarah Gol, Mahneshan, Zanjan Province
