= Taveh (disambiguation) =

Taveh (Persian: بتاوه) or its variants may refer to:

== Iran ==
- Tavil, East Azerbaijan, a village in East Azerbaijan province also known as Taveh
- Taveh Dashqoli, a village in Fars province
- Taveh Fashang, a village in Fars province
- Taveh Kabud, a village in Khuzestan province
- Tuveh, Khuzestan, a village in Khuzestan province also known as Taveh
- Sarab-e Taveh, a village in Kohgiluyeh and Boyer-Ahmad province
- Taveh Badom, a village in Kohgiluyeh and Boyer-Ahmad province
- Taveh Espid, a village in Kohgiluyeh and Boyer-Ahmad province
- Taveh, a village in Hamadan province
- Tuveh, West Azerbaijan, a village in West Azerbaijan province also known as Taveh
