= Karim Ishan, Maraveh Tappeh =

Village in Golestan province, Iran

Karim Ishan Persian: كريم ايشان
- Village
- Location within Iran
- Coordinates: 37°38′55″N 55°43′17″E
- Country: Iran
- Province: Golestan
- County: Maraveh Tappeh
- District: Golidagh
- Rural District: Shalami

Population (2016)
  - Total: 620
- Time zone: UTC+3:30 (IRST)

Karim Ishan (Persian: كريم ايشان) (Note: Also romanized as Karīm Īshān and Karīmishān) is a village in Shalami Rural District of Golidagh District in Maraveh Tappeh County, Golestan province, Iran.

== Demographics ==
=== Population ===
At the time of the 2006 National Census, the village's population was 689 in 146 households, when it was in Maraveh Tappeh Rural District of the former Maraveh Tappeh District in Kalaleh County. The following census in 2011 counted 658 people in 166 households, by which time the district had been separated from the county in the establishment of Maraveh Tappeh County. The rural district was transferred to the new Central District, and Karim Ishan was transferred to Shalami Rural District created in the new Golidagh District. The 2016 census measured the population of the village as 620 people in 170 households.
