= Meydan-e Jigh-e Kuchak =

Village in Golestan province, Iran

Meydan-e Jigh-e Kuchak Persian: ميدان جيغ كوچك
- Village
- Location within Iran
- Country: Iran
- Province: Golestan
- County: Maraveh Tappeh
- District: Golidagh
- Rural District: Shalami

Population (2016)
  - Total: 83
- Time zone: UTC+3:30 (IRST)

Meydan-e Jigh-e Kuchak (Persian: ميدان جيغ كوچك) (Note: Also romanized as Meydān-e Jīgh-e Kūchak; also known as Meydān-e Jīq-e Kūchak) is a village in Shalami Rural District of Golidagh District in Maraveh Tappeh County, Golestan province, Iran.

== Demographics ==
=== Population ===
At the time of the 2006 National Census, the village's population was 32 in six households, when it was in Maraveh Tappeh Rural District of the former Maraveh Tappeh District in Kalaleh County. The following census in 2011 counted 26 people in six households, by which time the district had been separated from the county in the establishment of Maraveh Tappeh County. The rural district was transferred to the new Central District, and Meydan-e Jigh-e Kuchak was transferred to Shalami Rural District created in the new Golidagh District. The 2016 census measured the population of the village as 83 people in 21 households.
