= Kachik =

Village in Golestan province, Iran

Kachik Persian: كچيك
- Village
- Location within Iran
- Coordinates: 37°43′38″N 55°52′30″E
- Country: Iran
- Province: Golestan
- County: Maraveh Tappeh
- District: Golidagh
- Rural District: Shalami

Population (2016)
  - Total: 363
- Time zone: UTC+3:30 (IRST)

Kachik (Persian: كچيك) (Note: Also romanized as Kachīk) is a village in Shalami Rural District of Golidagh District in Maraveh Tappeh County, Golestan province, Iran.

== Demographics ==
=== Population ===
At the time of the 2006 National Census, the village's population was 314 in 57 households, when it was in Maraveh Tappeh Rural District of the former Maraveh Tappeh District in Kalaleh County. The following census in 2011 counted 323 people in 75 households, by which time the district had been separated from the county in the establishment of Maraveh Tappeh County. The rural district was transferred to the new Central District, and Kachik was transferred to Shalami Rural District created in the new Golidagh District. The 2016 census measured the population of the village as 363 people in 105 households.
