= Arab Qarri Hajji =

Village in Golestan province, Iran

Arab Qarri Hajji Persian: عرب قاري حاجي
- Village
- Location within Iran
- Coordinates: 37°40′58″N 55°44′48″E
- Country: Iran
- Province: Golestan
- County: Maraveh Tappeh
- District: Golidagh
- Rural District: Shalami

Population (2016)
  - Total: 1,402
- Time zone: UTC+3:30 (IRST)

Arab Qarri Hajji (Persian: عرب قاري حاجي) (Note: Also romanized as ‘Arab Qārrī Ḩājjī; also known as ‘Arab Qareh Ḩājjī) is a village in, and the capital of, Shalami Rural District in Golidagh District of Maraveh Tappeh County, Golestan province, Iran.

== Demographics ==
=== Population ===
At the time of the 2006 National Census, the village's population was 1,272 in 262 households, when it was in Maraveh Tappeh Rural District of the former Maraveh Tappeh District in Kalaleh County. The following census in 2011 counted 1,293 people in 310 households, by which time the district had been separated from the county in the establishment of Maraveh Tappeh County. The rural district was transferred to the new Central District. Arab Qarri Hajji was transferred to Shalami Rural District created in the new Golidagh District. The 2016 census measured the population of the village as 1,402 people in 352 households.
