= Aq Emam =

Village in Golestan province, Iran

Aq Emam Persian: آق امام
- Village
- Location within Iran
- Coordinates: 37°43′43″N 55°57′00″E
- Country: Iran
- Province: Golestan
- County: Maraveh Tappeh
- District: Golidagh
- Rural District: Shalami

Population (2016)
  - Total: 1,624
- Time zone: UTC+3:30 (IRST)

Aq Emam (Persian: آق امام) (Note: Also romanized as Āq Emām) is a village in Shalami Rural District of Golidagh District in Maraveh Tappeh County, Golestan province, Iran.

== Demographics ==
=== Population ===
At the time of the 2006 National Census, the village's population was 1,563 in 314 households, when it was in Maraveh Tappeh Rural District of the former Maraveh Tappeh District in Kalaleh County. The following census in 2011 counted 1,688 people in 432 households, by which time the district had been separated from the county in the establishment of Maraveh Tappeh County. The rural district was transferred to the new Central District, and Aq Emam was transferred to Shalami Rural District created in the new Golidagh District. The 2016 census measured the population of the village as 1,624 people in 456 households. It was the most populous village in its rural district.
