= Ucheran =

Village in Golestan province, Iran

Ucheran Persian: اوچران
- Village
- Location within Iran
- Coordinates: 37°45′54″N 56°00′31″E
- Country: Iran
- Province: Golestan
- County: Maraveh Tappeh
- District: Golidagh
- Rural District: Shalami

Population (2016)
  - Total: 238
- Time zone: UTC+3:30 (IRST)

Ucheran (Persian: اوچران) (Note: Also romanized as ‘Ūcherān) is a village in Shalami Rural District of Golidagh District in Maraveh Tappeh County, Golestan province, Iran.

== Demographics ==
=== Population ===
At the time of the 2006 National Census, the village's population was 234 in 47 households, when it was in Maraveh Tappeh Rural District of the former Maraveh Tappeh District in Kalaleh County. The following census in 2011 counted 208 people in 48 households, by which time the district had been separated from the county in the establishment of Maraveh Tappeh County. The rural district was transferred to the new Central District, and Ucheran was transferred to Shalami Rural District created in the new Golidagh District. The 2016 census measured the population of the village as 238 people in 60 households.
