= Qazan Qayeh =

Village in Golestan province, Iran

Qazan Qayeh Persian: قازان قايه
- Village
- Location within Iran
- Coordinates: 37°55′10″N 56°15′40″E
- Country: Iran
- Province: Golestan
- County: Maraveh Tappeh
- District: Central
- Rural District: Palizan

Population (2016)
  - Total: 1,992
- Time zone: UTC+3:30 (IRST)

Qazan Qayeh (Persian: قازان قايه) (Note: Also romanized as Qāzān Qāyeh and Qāzān Qayeh; also known as Qāzān Qīleh) is a village in, and the capital of, Palizan Rural District in the Central District of Maraveh Tappeh County, Golestan province, Iran.

== Demographics ==
=== Population ===
At the time of the 2006 National Census, the village's population was 1,610 in 335 households, when it was in Maraveh Tappeh Rural District of the former Maraveh Tappeh District in Kalaleh County. The following census in 2011 counted 1,955 people in 451 households, by which time the district had been separated from the county in the establishment of Maraveh Tappeh County. The rural district was transferred to the new Central District, and Qazan Qayeh was transferred to Palizan Rural District created in the same district. The 2016 census measured the population of the village as 1,992 people in 559 households. It was the most populous village in its rural district.
