= Farq Sar-e Pain =

Village in Golestan province, Iran

Farq Sar-e Pain Persian: فرق سرپائين
- Village
- Location within Iran
- Coordinates: 37°54′50″N 56°06′03″E
- Country: Iran
- Province: Golestan
- County: Maraveh Tappeh
- District: Central
- Rural District: Palizan

Population (2016)
  - Total: 870
- Time zone: UTC+3:30 (IRST)

Farq Sar-e Pain (Persian: فرق سرپائين) (Note: Also romanized as Farq Sar-e Pā’īn; also known as Farkhasar and Farq Sar) is a village in Palizan Rural District of the Central District in Maraveh Tappeh County, Golestan province, Iran.

== Demographics ==
=== Population ===
At the time of the 2006 National Census, the village's population was 796 in 129 households, when it was in Maraveh Tappeh Rural District of the former Maraveh Tappeh District in Kalaleh County. The following census in 2011 counted 897 people in 189 households, by which time the district had been separated from the county in the establishment of Maraveh Tappeh County. The rural district was transferred to the new Central District, and Farq Sar-e Pain was transferred to Palizan Rural District created in the same district. The 2016 census measured the population of the village as 870 people in 210 households.
