= Yekkeh Tut-e Pain =

Village in Golestan province, Iran

Yekkeh Tut-e Pain Persian: يكه توت پائين
- Village
- Location within Iran
- Coordinates: 37°54′42″N 56°04′13″E
- Country: Iran
- Province: Golestan
- County: Maraveh Tappeh
- District: Central
- Rural District: Palizan

Population (2016)
  - Total: 402
- Time zone: UTC+3:30 (IRST)

Yekkeh Tut-e Pain (Persian: يكه توت پائين) (Note: Also romanized as Yekkeh Tūt-e Pā’īn; also known as Yekkeh Tūt-e Soflá) is a village in Palizan Rural District of the Central District in Maraveh Tappeh County, Golestan province, Iran.

== Demographics ==
=== Population ===
At the time of the 2006 National Census, the village's population was 330 in 62 households, when it was in Maraveh Tappeh Rural District of the former Maraveh Tappeh District in Kalaleh County. The following census in 2011 counted 375 people in 91 households, by which time the district had been separated from the county in the establishment of Maraveh Tappeh County. The rural district was transferred to the new Central District, and Yekkeh Tut-e Pain was transferred to Palizan Rural District created in the same district. The 2016 census measured the population of the village as 402 people in 110 households.
