= Cheshmeh Li =

Village in Golestan province, Iran

Cheshmeh Li Persian: چشمه لي
- Village
- Location within Iran
- Coordinates: 37°41′05″N 55°50′20″E
- Country: Iran
- Province: Golestan
- County: Maraveh Tappeh
- District: Golidagh
- Rural District: Shalami

Population (2016)
  - Total: 602
- Time zone: UTC+3:30 (IRST)

Cheshmeh Li (Persian: چشمه لي) (Note: Also romanized as Cheshmeh Lī; also known as Cheshmeh Ali, also romanized as Cheshmeh 'Alī, Cheshmeh Ālī, and Cheshmeh-ye Ālī) is a village in Shalami Rural District of Golidagh District in Maraveh Tappeh County, Golestan province, Iran.

== Demographics ==
=== Population ===
At the time of the 2006 National Census, the village's population was 528 in 86 households, when it was in Golidagh Rural District of the former Maraveh Tappeh District in Kalaleh County. The following census in 2011 counted 542 people in 131 households, by which time the district had been separated from the county in the establishment of Maraveh Tappeh County. The rural district was transferred to the new Golidagh District, and Cheshmeh Li was transferred to Shalami Rural District created in the same district. The 2016 census measured the population of the village as 602 people in 166 households.
