= Mohammad Shahir =

Village in Golestan province, Iran

Mohammad Shahir Persian: محمدشاهير
- Village
- Location within Iran
- Coordinates: 37°54′48″N 56°14′16″E
- Country: Iran
- Province: Golestan
- County: Maraveh Tappeh
- District: Central
- Rural District: Palizan

Population (2016)
  - Total: 148
- Time zone: UTC+3:30 (IRST)

Mohammad Shahir (Persian: محمدشاهير) (Note: Also romanized as Moḩammad Shāhīr; also known as Moḩammad Shā‘er) is a village in Palizan Rural District of the Central District in Maraveh Tappeh County, Golestan province, Iran.

== Demographics ==
=== Population ===
At the time of the 2006 National Census, the village's population was 130 in 24 households, when it was in Maraveh Tappeh Rural District of the former Maraveh Tappeh District in Kalaleh County. The following census in 2011 counted 166 people in 31 households, by which time the district had been separated from the county in the establishment of Maraveh Tappeh County. The rural district was transferred to the new Central District, and Mohammad Shahir was transferred to Palizan Rural District created in the same district. The 2016 census measured the population of the village as 148 people in 34 households.
