= Aq Qaleh, Golestan =

Village in Golestan province, Iran

Aq Qaleh Persian: آق قلعه
- Village
- Location within Iran
- Coordinates: 37°55′24″N 56°16′45″E
- Country: Iran
- Province: Golestan
- County: Maraveh Tappeh
- District: Central
- Rural District: Palizan

Population (2016)
  - Total: 464
- Time zone: UTC+3:30 (IRST)

Aq Qaleh (Persian: آق قلعه) (Note: Also romanized as Āq Qal‘eh; also known as Āg Qal‘eh) is a village in Palizan Rural District of the Central District in Maraveh Tappeh County, Golestan province, Iran.

== Demographics ==
=== Population ===
At the time of the 2006 National Census, the village's population was 375 in 73 households, when it was in Maraveh Tappeh Rural District of the former Maraveh Tappeh District in Kalaleh County. The following census in 2011 counted 458 people in 118 households, by which time the district had been separated from the county in the establishment of Maraveh Tappeh County. The rural district was transferred to the new Central District, and Aq Qaleh was transferred to Palizan Rural District created in the same district. The 2016 census measured the population of the village as 464 people in 130 households.
