= Atajan Qorbanli =

Village in Golestan province, Iran

Atajan Qorbanli Persian: عطاجان قربانلي
- Village
- Location within Iran
- Coordinates: 38°03′00″N 56°08′16″E
- Country: Iran
- Province: Golestan
- County: Maraveh Tappeh
- District: Central
- Rural District: Palizan

Population (2016)
  - Total: 91
- Time zone: UTC+3:30 (IRST)

Atajan Qorbanli (Persian: عطاجان قربانلي) (Note: Also romanized as ‘Aţājān Qorbānlī; also known as ‘Aţājān Qorbān) is a village in Palizan Rural District of the Central District in Maraveh Tappeh County, Golestan province, Iran.

== Demographics ==
=== Population ===
At the time of the 2006 National Census, the village's population was 61 in 11 households, when it was in Maraveh Tappeh Rural District of the former Maraveh Tappeh District in Kalaleh County. The following census in 2011 counted 44 people in 10 households, by which time the district had been separated from the county in the establishment of Maraveh Tappeh County. The rural district was transferred to the new Central District, and Atajan Qorbanli was transferred to Palizan Rural District created in the same district. The 2016 census measured the population of the village as 91 people in 24 households.
