= Qusheh Tappeh =

Village in Golestan province, Iran

Qusheh Tappeh Persian: قوشه تپه
- Village
- Location within Iran
- Coordinates: 37°54′51″N 56°14′42″E
- Country: Iran
- Province: Golestan
- County: Maraveh Tappeh
- District: Central
- Rural District: Palizan

Population (2016)
  - Total: 288
- Time zone: UTC+3:30 (IRST)

Qusheh Tappeh (Persian: قوشه تپه) (Note: Also romanized as Qūsheh Tappeh; also known as Qūsh Tappeh) is a village in Palizan Rural District of the Central District in Maraveh Tappeh County, Golestan province, Iran.

== Demographics ==
=== Population ===
At the time of the 2006 National Census, the village's population was 258 in 51 households, when it was in Maraveh Tappeh Rural District of the former Maraveh Tappeh District in Kalaleh County. The following census in 2011 counted 295 people in 70 households, by which time the district had been separated from the county in the establishment of Maraveh Tappeh County. The rural district was transferred to the new Central District, and Qusheh Tappeh was transferred to Palizan Rural District created in the same district. The 2016 census measured the population of the village as 288 people in 80 households.
