= Mardom Darreh =

Village in Golestan province, Iran

Mardom Darreh Persian: مردم دره
- Village
- Location within Iran
- Coordinates: 38°03′36″N 56°09′36″E
- Country: Iran
- Province: Golestan
- County: Maraveh Tappeh
- District: Central
- Rural District: Palizan

Population (2016)
  - Total: 172
- Time zone: UTC+3:30 (IRST)

Mardom Darreh (Persian: مردم دره) is a village in Palizan Rural District of the Central District in Maraveh Tappeh County, Golestan province, Iran.

== Demographics ==
=== Population ===
At the time of the 2006 National Census, the village's population was 108 in 26 households, when it was in Maraveh Tappeh Rural District of the former Maraveh Tappeh District in Kalaleh County. The following census in 2011 counted 100 people in 26 households, by which time the district had been separated from the county in the establishment of Maraveh Tappeh County. The rural district was transferred to the new Central District, and Mardom Darreh was transferred to Palizan Rural District created in the same district. The 2016 census measured the population of the village as 172 people in 46 households.
