= Allah Nur =

Village in Golestan province, Iran

Allah Nur Persian: اله نور
- Village
- Location within Iran
- Coordinates: 37°54′36″N 56°11′55″E
- Country: Iran
- Province: Golestan
- County: Maraveh Tappeh
- District: Central
- Rural District: Palizan

Population (2016)
  - Total: 228
- Time zone: UTC+3:30 (IRST)

Allah Nur (Persian: اله نور) (Note: Also romanized as Allāh Nūr; also known as Qareh Meshk) is a village in Palizan Rural District of the Central District in Maraveh Tappeh County, Golestan province, Iran.

== Demographics ==
=== Population ===
At the time of the 2006 National Census, the village's population was 184 in 37 households, when it was in Maraveh Tappeh Rural District of the former Maraveh Tappeh District in Kalaleh County. The following census in 2011 counted 197 people in 41 households, by which time the district had been separated from the county in the establishment of Maraveh Tappeh County. The rural district was transferred to the new Central District, and Allah Nur was transferred to Palizan Rural District created in the same district. The 2016 census measured the population of the village as 228 people in 60 households.
