= Ternavoli-ye Pain =

Village in Golestan province, Iran

Ternavoli-ye Pain Persian: ترناولي پائين
- Village
- Location within Iran
- Coordinates: 37°54′09″N 56°05′26″E
- Country: Iran
- Province: Golestan
- County: Maraveh Tappeh
- District: Central
- Rural District: Palizan

Population (2016)
  - Total: 319
- Time zone: UTC+3:30 (IRST)

Ternavoli-ye Pain (Persian: ترناولي پائين) (Note: Also romanized as Ternāvolī-ye Pā’īn; also known as Renāvolī-ye Soflá and Ternāvolī-ye Soflá) is a village in Palizan Rural District of the Central District in Maraveh Tappeh County, Golestan province, Iran.

== Demographics ==
=== Population ===
At the time of the 2006 National Census, the village's population was 263 in 54 households, when it was in Maraveh Tappeh Rural District of the former Maraveh Tappeh District in Kalaleh County. The following census in 2011 counted 292 people in 62 households, by which time the district had been separated from the county in the establishment of Maraveh Tappeh County. The rural district was transferred to the new Central District, and Ternavoli-ye Pain was transferred to Palizan Rural District created in the same district. The 2016 census measured the population of the village as 319 people in 74 households.
