= Post Darreh-ye Pain =

Village in Golestan province, Iran

Post Darreh-ye Pain Persian: پُست دَرِّه پائين
- Village
- Location within Iran
- Coordinates: 37°58′28″N 56°17′34″E
- Country: Iran
- Province: Golestan
- County: Maraveh Tappeh
- District: Central
- Rural District: Palizan

Population (2016)
  - Total: 288
- Time zone: UTC+3:30 (IRST)

Post Darreh-ye Pain (Persian: پُست دَرِّه پائين) (Note: Also romanized as Post Darreh-ye Pā’īn; formerly known as Post Darreh (پست دره); also known as Pūst Darreh) is a village in Palizan Rural District of the Central District in Maraveh Tappeh County, Golestan province, Iran.

== Demographics ==
=== Population ===
At the time of the 2006 National Census, the village's population, as Post Darreh, was 408 in 73 households, when it was in Maraveh Tappeh Rural District of the former Maraveh Tappeh District in Kalaleh County. The following census in 2011 counted 225 people in 46 households, by which time the district had been separated from the county in the establishment of Maraveh Tappeh County. The rural district was transferred to the new Central District. Post Darreh was transferred to Palizan Rural District created in the same district and listed as Post Darreh-ye Pain. The 2016 census measured the population of the village as 288 people in 67 households.
