= Yekkeh Tappeh =

Village in Golestan province, Iran

Yekkeh Tappeh Persian: يكه تپه
- Village
- Location within Iran
- Coordinates: 37°54′45″N 56°13′39″E
- Country: Iran
- Province: Golestan
- County: Maraveh Tappeh
- District: Central
- Rural District: Palizan

Population (2016)
  - Total: 164
- Time zone: UTC+3:30 (IRST)

Yekkeh Tappeh (Persian: يكه تپه) is a village in Palizan Rural District of the Central District in Maraveh Tappeh County, Golestan province, Iran.

== Demographics ==
=== Population ===
At the time of the 2006 National Census, the village's population was 139 in 25 households, when it was in Maraveh Tappeh Rural District of the former Maraveh Tappeh District in Kalaleh County. The following census in 2011 counted 181 people in 36 households, by which time the district had been separated from the county in the establishment of Maraveh Tappeh County. The rural district was transferred to the new Central District, and Yekkeh Tappeh was transferred to Palizan Rural District created in the same district. The 2016 census measured the population of the village as 164 people in 37 households.
