= Parcheqli =

Village in Golestan province, Iran

Parcheqli Persian: پارچقلي
- Village
- Location within Iran
- Coordinates: 37°40′26″N 55°45′17″E
- Country: Iran
- Province: Golestan
- County: Maraveh Tappeh
- District: Golidagh
- Rural District: Shalami

Population (2016)
  - Total: 483
- Time zone: UTC+3:30 (IRST)

Parcheqli (Persian: پارچقلي) (Note: Also romanized as Pārcheqlī; also known as Pārcheqlī-ye Bālā and Pālcheqlī-ye Bālā) is a village in Shalami Rural District of Golidagh District in Maraveh Tappeh County, Golestan province, Iran.

== Demographics ==
=== Population ===
At the time of the 2006 National Census, the village's population was 414 in 96 households, when it was in Golidagh Rural District of the former Maraveh Tappeh District in Kalaleh County. The following census in 2011 counted 438 people in 91 households, by which time the district had been separated from the county in the establishment of Maraveh Tappeh County. The rural district was transferred to the new Golidagh District, and Parcheqli was transferred to Shalami Rural District created in the same district. The 2016 census measured the population of the village as 483 people in 132 households.
