= Baqi, Golestan =

Village in Golestan province, Iran

Baqi Persian: باقی
- Village
- Country: Iran
- Province: Golestan
- County: Maraveh Tappeh
- District: Central
- Rural District: Palizan

Population (2016)
  - Total: 55
- Time zone: UTC+3:30 (IRST)

Baqi (Persian: باقی) (Note: Also romanized as Bāqī) is a village in Palizan Rural District of the Central District in Maraveh Tappeh County, Golestan province, Iran.

== Demographics ==
=== Population ===
At the time of the 2006 National Census, the village's population was 36 in seven households, when it was in Maraveh Tappeh Rural District of the former Maraveh Tappeh District in Kalaleh County. The following census in 2011 counted 41 people in nine households, by which time the district had been separated from the county in the establishment of Maraveh Tappeh County. The rural district was transferred to the new Central District, and Baqi was transferred to Palizan Rural District created in the same district. The 2016 census measured the population of the village as 55 people in 15 households.
