= Dadli-ye Qazneyn =

Village in Golestan province, Iran

Dadli-ye Qazneyn Persian: دادلي قزنين
- Village
- Location within Iran
- Coordinates: 38°02′26″N 56°04′07″E
- Country: Iran
- Province: Golestan
- County: Maraveh Tappeh
- District: Central
- Rural District: Palizan

Population (2016)
  - Total: 400
- Time zone: UTC+3:30 (IRST)

Dadli-ye Qazneyn (Persian: دادلي قزنين) (Note: Also romanized as Dādlī-ye Qazneyn; also known as Dādlī-ye-Ghazneyn and Dādlī-ye Qarneyn) is a village in Palizan Rural District of the Central District in Maraveh Tappeh County, Golestan province, Iran.

== Demographics ==
=== Population ===
At the time of the 2006 National Census, the village's population was 264 in 57 households, when it was in Maraveh Tappeh Rural District of the former Maraveh Tappeh District in Kalaleh County. The following census in 2011 counted 255 people in 64 households, by which time the district had been separated from the county in the establishment of Maraveh Tappeh County. The rural district was transferred to the new Central District, and Dadli-ye Qazneyn was transferred to Palizan Rural District created in the same district. The 2016 census measured the population of the village as 400 people in 116 households.
