= Guk Darreh =

Village in Golestan province, Iran

Guk Darreh Persian: گوك دره
- Village
- Location within Iran
- Coordinates: 37°57′53″N 56°15′57″E
- Country: Iran
- Province: Golestan
- County: Maraveh Tappeh
- District: Central
- Rural District: Palizan

Population (2016)
  - Total: 997
- Time zone: UTC+3:30 (IRST)

Guk Darreh (Persian: گوك دره) (Note: Also romanized as Gūk Darreh; also known as Gūg Darreh) is a village in Palizan Rural District of the Central District in Maraveh Tappeh County, Golestan province, Iran.

== Demographics ==
=== Population ===
At the time of the 2006 National Census, the village's population was 745 in 154 households, when it was in Maraveh Tappeh Rural District of the former Maraveh Tappeh District in Kalaleh County. The following census in 2011 counted 926 people in 220 households, by which time the district had been separated from the county in the establishment of Maraveh Tappeh County. The rural district was transferred to the new Central District, and Guk Darreh was transferred to Palizan Rural District created in the same district. The 2016 census measured the population of the village as 997 people in 273 households.
