= Gavandar =

Village in Golestan province, Iran

Gavandar Persian: گوندر
- Village
- Location within Iran
- Coordinates: 37°55′03″N 56°09′35″E
- Country: Iran
- Province: Golestan
- County: Maraveh Tappeh
- District: Central
- Rural District: Palizan

Population (2016)
  - Total: 288
- Time zone: UTC+3:30 (IRST)

Gavandar (Persian: گوندر) (Note: Also romanized as Gavāndar and Govāndar) is a village in Palizan Rural District of the Central District in Maraveh Tappeh County, Golestan province, Iran.

== Demographics ==
=== Population ===
At the time of the 2006 National Census, the village's population was 210 in 35 households, when it was in Maraveh Tappeh Rural District of the former Maraveh Tappeh District in Kalaleh County. The following census in 2011 counted 242 people in 51 households, by which time the district had been separated from the county in the establishment of Maraveh Tappeh County. The rural district was transferred to the new Central District, and Gavandar was transferred to Palizan Rural District created in the same district. The 2016 census measured the population of the village as 288 people in 87 households.
