= Alti Aghaj-e Kuchak =

Village in Golestan province, Iran

Alti Aghaj-e Kuchak Persian: التي اغاج كوچك
- Village
- Location within Iran
- Coordinates: 37°42′37″N 55°54′27″E
- Country: Iran
- Province: Golestan
- County: Maraveh Tappeh
- District: Golidagh
- Rural District: Shalami

Population (2016)
  - Total: 214
- Time zone: UTC+3:30 (IRST)

Alti Aghaj-e Kuchak (Persian: التي اغاج كوچك) (Note: Also romanized as Āltī Āghāj-e Kūchak) is a village in Shalami Rural District of Golidagh District in Maraveh Tappeh County, Golestan province, Iran.

== Demographics ==
=== Population ===
At the time of the 2006 National Census, the village's population was 480 in 89 households, when it was in Maraveh Tappeh Rural District of the former Maraveh Tappeh District in Kalaleh County. The following census in 2011 counted 578 people in 119 households, by which time the district had been separated from the county in the establishment of Maraveh Tappeh County. The rural district was transferred to the new Central District, and Alti Aghaj-e Kuchak was transferred to Shalami Rural District created in the new Golidagh District. The 2016 census measured the population of the village as 214 people in 58 households.
