= Palcheqli Yamut =

Village in Golestan province, Iran

Palcheqli Yamut Persian: پالْچِقْلي يَموت
- Village
- Location within Iran
- Coordinates: 37°55′45″N 56°11′54″E
- Country: Iran
- Province: Golestan
- County: Maraveh Tappeh
- District: Central
- Rural District: Palizan

Population (2016)
  - Total: 130
- Time zone: UTC+3:30 (IRST)

Palcheqli Yamut (Persian: پالْچِقْلي يَموت) (Note: Also romanized as Pālcheqlī Yamūt; formerly known as Palcheqli (پالچقل), also romanized as Pālcheqlī; also known as Pālcheqlī Āqlar) is a village in Palizan Rural District of the Central District in Maraveh Tappeh County, Golestan province, Iran.

== Demographics ==
=== Population ===
At the time of the 2006 National Census, the village's population, as Palcheqli, was 120 in 24 households, when it was in Maraveh Tappeh Rural District of the former Maraveh Tappeh District in Kalaleh County. The following census in 2011 counted 136 people in 27 households, by which time the district had been separated from the county in the establishment of Maraveh Tappeh County. The rural district was transferred to the new Central District. Palcheqli was transferred to Palizan Rural District created in the same district and listed as Palcheqli Yamut. The 2016 census measured the population of the village as 130 people in 30 households.
