= Dowlat Owrlan =

Village in Golestan province, Iran

Dowlat Owrlan Persian: دولت اورلان
- Village
- Location within Iran
- Coordinates: 37°59′23″N 56°08′18″E
- Country: Iran
- Province: Golestan
- County: Maraveh Tappeh
- District: Central
- Rural District: Palizan

Population (2016)
  - Total: 243
- Time zone: UTC+3:30 (IRST)

Dowlat Owrlan (Persian: دولت اورلان) (Note: Also romanized as Dowlat Owrlān) is a village in Palizan Rural District of the Central District in Maraveh Tappeh County, Golestan province, Iran.

== Demographics ==
=== Population ===
At the time of the 2006 National Census, the village's population was 241 in 46 households, when it was in Maraveh Tappeh Rural District of the former Maraveh Tappeh District in Kalaleh County. The following census in 2011 counted 268 people in 67 households, by which time the district had been separated from the county in the establishment of Maraveh Tappeh County. The rural district was transferred to the new Central District, and Dowlat Owrlan was transferred to Palizan Rural District created in the same district. The 2016 census measured the population of the village as 243 people in 69 households.
