= Dasht-e Murd =

Dasht-e Murd or Dasht-e Mowrd (Persian: دشتمورد) may refer to:

- Dasht-e Murd, Mahur, Mamasani County, Fars Province
- Dasht-e Murd, Mishan, Mamasani County, Fars Province
- Dasht-e Mowrd, Kohgiluyeh and Boyer-Ahmad
