= Tuveh =

Tuveh (Persian: توه) may refer to:

- Tuveh, Khuzestan
- Tuveh, West Azerbaijan

== See also ==
- Tuveh Khoshkeh (disambiguation)
