= Khujeh Galdi =

Village in Golestan province, Iran

Khujeh Galdi Persian: خوجه گلدي
- Village
- Location within Iran
- Coordinates: 37°52′02″N 55°46′13″E
- Country: Iran
- Province: Golestan
- County: Maraveh Tappeh
- District: Central
- Rural District: Maraveh Tappeh

Population (2016)
  - Total: 623
- Time zone: UTC+3:30 (IRST)

Khujeh Galdi (Persian: خوجه گلدي) (Note: Also romanized as Khūjeh Galdī, Khvājeh Galdī, and Khvojehgaldī; also known as Khājehgaldī) is a village in Maraveh Tappeh Rural District of the Central District in Maraveh Tappeh County, Golestan province, Iran.

== Demographics ==
=== Population ===
At the time of the 2006 National Census, the village's population was 453 in 83 households, when it was in the former Maraveh Tappeh District of Kalaleh County. The following census in 2011 counted 529 people in 109 households, by which time the district had been separated from the county in the establishment of Maraveh Tappeh County. The rural district was transferred to the new Central District. The 2016 census measured the population of the village as 623 people in 170 households.
