= Eslamabad-e Pain, Golidagh =

Village in Golestan province, Iran

Eslamabad-e Pain Persian: اِسْلام آباد پايين
- Village
- Location within Iran
- Coordinates: 37°39′22″N 56°05′32″E
- Country: Iran
- Province: Golestan
- County: Maraveh Tappeh
- District: Golidagh
- Rural District: Golidagh

Population (2016)
  - Total: 956
- Time zone: UTC+3:30 (IRST)

Eslamabad-e Pain (Persian: اِسْلام آباد پايين) (Note: Also romanized as Eslāmābād-e Pā’īn; formerly known as Eslamabad (اسلام اباد), also romanized as Eslāmābād) is a village in Golidagh Rural District of Golidagh District in Maraveh Tappeh County, Golestan province, Iran.

== Demographics ==
=== Population ===
At the time of the 2006 National Census, the village's population, as Eslamabad, was 776 in 167 households, when it was in the former Maraveh Tappeh District of Kalaleh County. The following census in 2011 counted 820 people in 213 households, by which time the district had been separated from the county in the establishment of Maraveh Tappeh County. The rural district was transferred to the new Golidagh District, and the village was listed as Eslamabad-e Pain. The 2016 census measured the population of the village as 956 people in 284 households.
