= Luhandar =

Village in Golestan province, Iran

Luhandar Persian: لوهندر
- Village
- Location within Iran
- Coordinates: 37°33′40″N 55°58′22″E
- Country: Iran
- Province: Golestan
- County: Maraveh Tappeh
- District: Golidagh
- Rural District: Golidagh

Population (2016)
  - Total: 709
- Time zone: UTC+3:30 (IRST)

Luhandar (Persian: لوهندر) (Note: Also romanized as Lūhandar; also known as Lowndor) is a village in Golidagh Rural District of Golidagh District in Maraveh Tappeh County, Golestan province, Iran.

== Demographics ==
=== Population ===
At the time of the 2006 National Census, the village's population was 546 in 97 households, when it was in the former Maraveh Tappeh District of Kalaleh County. The following census in 2011 counted 576 people in 150 households, by which time the district had been separated from the county in the establishment of Maraveh Tappeh County. The rural district was transferred to the new Golidagh District. The 2016 census measured the population of the village as 709 people in 205 households.
