= Yan Bolagh, Golestan =

Village in Golestan province, Iran

Yan Bolagh Persian: يانبلاغ
- Village
- Location within Iran
- Coordinates: 37°36′53″N 55°59′52″E
- Country: Iran
- Province: Golestan
- County: Maraveh Tappeh
- District: Golidagh
- Rural District: Golidagh

Population (2016)
  - Total: 2,183
- Time zone: UTC+3:30 (IRST)

Yan Bolagh (Persian: يانبلاغ) (Note: Also romanized as Yān Bolāgh) is a village in Golidagh Rural District of Golidagh District in Maraveh Tappeh County, Golestan province, Iran.

== Demographics ==
=== Population ===
At the time of the 2006 National Census, the village's population was 1,708 in 345 households, when it was in the former Maraveh Tappeh District of Kalaleh County. The following census in 2011 counted 1,962 people in 476 households, by which time the district had been separated from the county in the establishment of Maraveh Tappeh County. The rural district was transferred to the new Golidagh District. The 2016 census measured the population of the village as 2,183 people in 586 households. It was the most populous village in its rural district.
