= Qorban Peykar =

Village in Golestan province, Iran

Qorban Peykar Persian: قربان پيكار
- Village
- Location within Iran
- Coordinates: 37°53′06″N 55°51′10″E
- Country: Iran
- Province: Golestan
- County: Maraveh Tappeh
- District: Central
- Rural District: Maraveh Tappeh

Population (2016)
  - Total: 429
- Time zone: UTC+3:30 (IRST)

Qorban Peykar (Persian: قربان پيكار) (Note: Also romanized as Qorbān Peykār; also known as Leylān Tappeh) is a village in Maraveh Tappeh Rural District of the Central District in Maraveh Tappeh County, Golestan province, Iran.

== Demographics ==
=== Population ===
At the time of the 2006 National Census, the village's population was 356 in 64 households, when it was in the former Maraveh Tappeh District of Kalaleh County. The following census in 2011 counted 377 people in 86 households, by which time the district had been separated from the county in the establishment of Maraveh Tappeh County. The rural district was transferred to the new Central District. The 2016 census measured the population of the village as 429 people in 115 households.
