= Qarnaveh-ye Olya =

Village in Golestan province, Iran

Qarnaveh-ye Olya Persian: قرناوه عليا
- Village
- Location within Iran
- Coordinates: 37°40′55″N 55°52′03″E
- Country: Iran
- Province: Golestan
- County: Maraveh Tappeh
- District: Golidagh
- Rural District: Shalami

Population (2016)
  - Total: 1,396
- Time zone: UTC+3:30 (IRST)

Qarnaveh-ye Olya (Persian: قرناوه عليا) (Note: Also romanized as Qarnāveh-ye ‘Olyā; also known as Qarnāveh and Qarnāveh-ye Bālā) is a village in Shalami Rural District of Golidagh District in Maraveh Tappeh County, Golestan province, Iran.

== Demographics ==
=== Population ===
At the time of the 2006 National Census, the village's population was 1,489 in 311 households, when it was in Golidagh Rural District of the former Maraveh Tappeh District in Kalaleh County. The following census in 2011 counted 1,506 people in 307 households, by which time the district had been separated from the county in the establishment of Maraveh Tappeh County. The rural district was transferred to the new Golidagh District, and Qarnaveh-ye Olya was transferred to Shalami Rural District created in the same district. The 2016 census measured the population of the village as 1,396 people in 370 households.
