= Arab Laleh Gun =

Village in Golestan province, Iran

Arab Laleh Gun Persian: عرب لاله گون
- Village
- Location within Iran
- Coordinates: 37°39′27″N 55°54′02″E
- Country: Iran
- Province: Golestan
- County: Maraveh Tappeh
- District: Golidagh
- Rural District: Golidagh

Population (2016)
  - Total: 682
- Time zone: UTC+3:30 (IRST)

Arab Laleh Gun (Persian: عرب لاله گون) (Note: Also romanized as ‘Arab Lāleh Gūn) is a village in Golidagh Rural District of Golidagh District in Maraveh Tappeh County, Golestan province, Iran.

== Demographics ==
=== Population ===
At the time of the 2006 National Census, the village's population was 618 in 126 households, when it was in the former Maraveh Tappeh District of Kalaleh County. The following census in 2011 counted 722 people in 186 households, by which time the district had been separated from the county in the establishment of Maraveh Tappeh County. The rural district was transferred to the new Golidagh District. The 2016 census measured the population of the village as 682 people in 195 households.
