= Margh =

Margh or Morgh (Persian: مرغ) may refer to:

- Morgh-e Bozorg, Fars Province
- Morgh-e Kuchak, Fars Province
- Margh, Isfahan
- Margh, Borkhar, Isfahan Province
- Margh, Golpayegan, Isfahan Province
- Margh, Markazi
- Margh, South Khorasan
