= Suzesh =

Village in Golestan province, Iran

Suzesh Persian: سوزش
- Village
- Location within Iran
- Coordinates: 37°51′56″N 55°45′38″E
- Country: Iran
- Province: Golestan
- County: Maraveh Tappeh
- District: Central
- Rural District: Maraveh Tappeh

Population (2016)
  - Total: 727
- Time zone: UTC+3:30 (IRST)

Suzesh (Persian: سوزش) (Note: Also romanized as Sūzesh) is a village in, and the capital of, Maraveh Tappeh Rural District in the Central District of Maraveh Tappeh County, Golestan province, Iran. The rural district was previously administered from the city of Maraveh Tappeh.

== Demographics ==
=== Population ===
At the time of the 2006 National Census, the village's population was 588 in 121 households, when it was in the former Maraveh Tappeh District of Kalaleh County. The following census in 2011 counted 693 people in 166 households, by which time the district had been separated from the county in the establishment of Maraveh Tappeh County. Central District. The 2016 census measured the population of the village as 727 people in 198 households.
