= Qarnaveh-ye Sofla =

Village in Golestan province, Iran

Qarnaveh-ye Sofla Persian: قرناوه سفلي
- Village
- Location within Iran
- Coordinates: 37°41′49″N 55°50′17″E
- Country: Iran
- Province: Golestan
- County: Maraveh Tappeh
- District: Golidagh
- Rural District: Shalami

Population (2016)
  - Total: 508
- Time zone: UTC+3:30 (IRST)

Qarnaveh-ye Sofla (Persian: قرناوه سفلي) (Note: Also romanized as Qarnāveh-ye Soflá; also known as Qarnāveh-ye Pā’īn) is a village in Shalami Rural District of Golidagh District in Maraveh Tappeh County, Golestan province, Iran.

== Demographics ==
=== Population ===
At the time of the 2006 National Census, the village's population was 603 in 113 households, when it was in Golidagh Rural District of the former Maraveh Tappeh District in Kalaleh County. The following census in 2011 counted 547 people in 134 households, by which time the district had been separated from the county in the establishment of Maraveh Tappeh County. The rural district was transferred to the new Golidagh District, and Qarnaveh-ye Sofla was transferred to Shalami Rural District created in the same district. The 2016 census measured the population of the village as 508 people in 141 households.
