= Qulaq Kasan =

Village in Golestan province, Iran

Qulaq Kasan Persian: قولاق كسن
- Village
- Location within Iran
- Coordinates: 37°37′57″N 55°52′12″E
- Country: Iran
- Province: Golestan
- County: Maraveh Tappeh
- District: Golidagh
- Rural District: Golidagh

Population (2016)
  - Total: 1,252
- Time zone: UTC+3:30 (IRST)

Qulaq Kasan (Persian: قولاق كسن) (Note: Also romanized as Qūlāq Kasan) is a village in Golidagh Rural District of Golidagh District in Maraveh Tappeh County, Golestan province, Iran.

== Demographics ==
=== Population ===
At the time of the 2006 National Census, the village's population was 732 in 124 households, when it was in the former Maraveh Tappeh District of Kalaleh County. The following census in 2011 counted 1,203 people in 294 households, by which time the district had been separated from the county in the establishment of Maraveh Tappeh County. The rural district was transferred to the new Golidagh District. The 2016 census measured the population of the village as 1,252 people in 339 households.
