= Qusheh Su =

Village in Golestan province, Iran

Qusheh Su Persian: قوشه سو
- Village
- Location within Iran
- Coordinates: 37°36′19″N 55°49′21″E
- Country: Iran
- Province: Golestan
- County: Maraveh Tappeh
- District: Golidagh
- Rural District: Golidagh

Population (2016)
  - Total: 1,465
- Time zone: UTC+3:30 (IRST)

Qusheh Su (Persian: قوشه سو) (Note: Also romanized as Qūsheh Sū) is a village in Golidagh Rural District of Golidagh District in Maraveh Tappeh County, Golestan province, Iran.

== Demographics ==
=== Population ===
At the time of the 2006 National Census, the village's population was 1,171 in 213 households, when it was in the former Maraveh Tappeh District of Kalaleh County. The following census in 2011 counted 1,394 people in 322 households, by which time the district had been separated from the county in the establishment of Maraveh Tappeh County. The rural district was transferred to the new Golidagh District. The 2016 census measured the population of the village as 1,465 people in 374 households.
