= Poli-ye Sofla =

Village in Golestan province, Iran

Poli-ye Sofla Persian: پلي سفلي
- Village
- Location within Iran
- Coordinates: 37°39′39″N 55°58′08″E
- Country: Iran
- Province: Golestan
- County: Maraveh Tappeh
- District: Golidagh
- Rural District: Golidagh

Population (2016)
  - Total: 716
- Time zone: UTC+3:30 (IRST)

Poli-ye Sofla (Persian: پلي سفلي) (Note: Also romanized as Polī-ye Soflá; also known as Pūlī-ye Pā’īn) is a village in Golidagh Rural District of Golidagh District in Maraveh Tappeh County, Golestan province, Iran.

== Demographics ==
=== Population ===
At the time of the 2006 National Census, the village's population was 641 in 107 households, when it was in the former Maraveh Tappeh District of Kalaleh County. The following census in 2011 counted 732 people in 185 households, by which time the district had been separated from the county in the establishment of Maraveh Tappeh County. The rural district was transferred to the new Golidagh District. The 2016 census measured the population of the village as 716 people in 191 households.
