= Qarqijeq =

Village in Golestan province, Iran

Qarqijeq Persian: قَرقيجَق
- Village
- Location within Iran
- Coordinates: 37°52′54″N 55°57′39″E
- Country: Iran
- Province: Golestan
- County: Maraveh Tappeh
- District: Central
- Rural District: Maraveh Tappeh

Population (2016)
  - Total: 499
- Time zone: UTC+3:30 (IRST)

Qarqijeq (Persian: قَرقيجَق) (Note: Also romanized as Qārqījeq; formerly known as Qarqojoq (قرقجق), also romanized as Qārqojoq; also known as Qaramjoq, Qargijek, and Qargijeq) is a village in Maraveh Tappeh Rural District of the Central District in Maraveh Tappeh County, Golestan province, Iran.

== Demographics ==
=== Population ===
At the time of the 2006 National Census, the village's population, as Qarqojoq, was 457 in 88 households, when it was in the former Maraveh Tappeh District of Kalaleh County. The following census in 2011 counted 485 people in 108 households, by which time the district had been separated from the county in the establishment of Maraveh Tappeh County. The rural district was transferred to the new Central District, and the village was listed as Qarqijeq. The 2016 census measured the population of the village as 499 people in 128 households.
