= Sari Qamish, Golestan =

Village in Golestan province, Iran

Sari Qamish Persian: ساري قميش
- Village
- Location within Iran
- Coordinates: 37°52′03″N 55°47′18″E
- Country: Iran
- Province: Golestan
- County: Maraveh Tappeh
- District: Central
- Rural District: Maraveh Tappeh

Population (2016)
  - Total: 444
- Time zone: UTC+3:30 (IRST)

Sari Qamish (Persian: ساري قميش) (Note: Also romanized as Sārī Qamīsh) is a village in Maraveh Tappeh Rural District of the Central District in Maraveh Tappeh County, Golestan province, Iran.

== Demographics ==
=== Population ===
At the time of the 2006 National Census, the village's population was 378 in 73 households, when it was in the former Maraveh Tappeh District of Kalaleh County. The following census in 2011 counted 416 people in 90 households, by which time the district had been separated from the county in the establishment of Maraveh Tappeh County. The rural district was transferred to the new Central District. The 2016 census measured the population of the village as 444 people in 121 households.
