= Narli Aji Su =

Village in Golestan province, Iran

Narli Aji Su Persian: نارلي آجي سو
- Village
- Location within Iran
- Coordinates: 38°02′54″N 55°48′57″E
- Country: Iran
- Province: Golestan
- County: Maraveh Tappeh
- District: Central
- Rural District: Maraveh Tappeh

Population (2016)
  - Total: 1,079
- Time zone: UTC+3:30 (IRST)

Narli Aji Su (Persian: نارلي آجي سو) (Note: Also romanized as Nārlī Ājī Sū; also known as Nārlī-ye Pā’īn) is a village in Maraveh Tappeh Rural District of the Central District in Maraveh Tappeh County, Golestan province, Iran.

== Demographics ==
=== Population ===
At the time of the 2006 National Census, the village's population was 1,029 in 175 households, when it was in the former Maraveh Tappeh District of Kalaleh County. The following census in 2011 counted 1,118 people in 219 households, by which time the district had been separated from the county in the establishment of Maraveh Tappeh County. The rural district was transferred to the new Central District. The 2016 census measured the population of the village as 1,079 people in 301 households.
