= Rímur (disambiguation) =

Rímur (singular Ríma) may refer to:

- Rímur, Icelandic epic poetry
- Rímur (album), the album by Sigur Rós and Steindór Andersen
- Rima, the DC comic book hero
- Rille, an extraterrestrial geological feature
- Rimur Elias, a village in Fars Province, Iran
- Rimur Sharif, a village in Fars Province, Iran
