= Qarah Gol-e Gharbi =

Village in Golestan province, Iran

Qarah Gol-e Gharbi Persian: قره گل غربي
- Village
- Location within Iran
- Coordinates: 37°56′04″N 55°35′24″E
- Country: Iran
- Province: Golestan
- County: Maraveh Tappeh
- District: Central
- Rural District: Maraveh Tappeh

Population (2016)
  - Total: 932
- Time zone: UTC+3:30 (IRST)

Qarah Gol-e Gharbi (Persian: قره گل غربي) (Note: Also romanized as Qarah Gol-e Gharbī) is a village in Maraveh Tappeh Rural District of the Central District in Maraveh Tappeh County, Golestan province, Iran.

== Demographics ==
=== Population ===
At the time of the 2006 National Census, the village's population was 756 in 139 households, when it was in the former Maraveh Tappeh District of Kalaleh County. The following census in 2011 counted 856 people in 173 households, by which time the district had been separated from the county in the establishment of Maraveh Tappeh County. The rural district was transferred to the new Central District. The 2016 census measured the population of the village as 932 people in 244 households.
