= Qareh Golul =

Qareh Golul (Persian: قره گلول), also known as Garagua, may refer to:

- Qareh Gol-e Olya
- Qareh Gol-e Sofla
