= Kuh-e Dera =

Kuh-e Dera كوه درا
- Village
- Location within Iran
- Coordinates: 29°55′09″N 51°13′28″E
- Country: Iran
- Province: Fars
- County: Mamasani
- Bakhsh: Mahvarmilani
- Rural District: Mahur

Population (2006)
  - Total: 53
- Time zone: UTC+3:30 (IRST)
  - Summer (DST): UTC+4:30 (IRDT)

Kuh-e Dera (Persian: كوه درا, also Romanized as Kūh-e Derā, Kūh-e Darā, and Kuh-i-Dera; also known as Kūh-e Dareh) is a village in Mahur Rural District, Mahvarmilani District, Mamasani County, Fars province, Iran. At the 2006 census, its population was 53, in 13 families.
