= Qernaq =

Village in Golestan province, Iran

Qernaq Persian: قرناق
- Village
- Location within Iran
- Coordinates: 37°43′00″N 55°40′32″E
- Country: Iran
- Province: Golestan
- County: Maraveh Tappeh
- District: Golidagh
- Rural District: Shalami

Population (2016)
  - Total: 640
- Time zone: UTC+3:30 (IRST)

Qernaq (Persian: قرناق) (Note: Also romanized as Qernāq) is a village in Shalami Rural District of Golidagh District in Maraveh Tappeh County, Golestan province, Iran.

== Demographics ==
=== Population ===
At the time of the 2006 National Census, the village's population was 517 in 93 households, when it was in Tamran Rural District of the Central District in Kalaleh County. The following census in 2011 counted 557 people in 142 households, by which time the village had been separated from the county in the establishment of Maraveh Tappeh County. Qernaq was transferred to Shalami Rural District created in the new Golidagh District. The 2016 census measured the population of the village as 640 people in 185 households.
