= Aq Taqeh =

Aq Taqeh (Persian: اق تقه) may refer to:

- Aq Taqeh-ye Jadid
- Aq Taqeh-ye Qadim

== See also ==
- Aq Toqeh
