= Hezar Balut =

Hezar Balut هزاربلوط
- Village
- Location within Iran
- Coordinates: 29°59′16″N 51°23′37″E
- Country: Iran
- Province: Fars
- County: Mamasani
- Bakhsh: Mahvarmilani
- Rural District: Mahur

Population (2006)
  - Total: 40
- Time zone: UTC+3:30 (IRST)
  - Summer (DST): UTC+4:30 (IRDT)

Hezar Balut (Persian: هزاربلوط, also Romanized as Hezār Balūţ and Hezārbalūţ) is a village in Mahur Rural District, Mahvarmilani District, Mamasani County, Fars province, Iran. At the 2006 census, its population was 40, in 11 families.
