= Murekord =

Murekord موركرد
- Village
- Location within Iran
- Coordinates: 29°59′47″N 51°19′46″E
- Country: Iran
- Province: Fars
- County: Mamasani
- Bakhsh: Mahvarmilani
- Rural District: Mahur

Population (2006)
  - Total: 46
- Time zone: UTC+3:30 (IRST)
  - Summer (DST): UTC+4:30 (IRDT)

Murekord (Persian: موركرد, also Romanized as Mūrekord; also known as Morekord) is a village in Mahur Rural District, Mahvarmilani District, Mamasani County, Fars province, Iran. At the 2006 census, its population was 46, in 13 families.
