= Qarah Gol-e Takhteh-ye Vasat =

Village in Golestan province, Iran

Qarah Gol-e Takhteh-ye Vasat Persian: قره گل تخته وسط
- Village
- Location within Iran
- Coordinates: 37°55′29″N 55°36′52″E
- Country: Iran
- Province: Golestan
- County: Maraveh Tappeh
- District: Central
- Rural District: Maraveh Tappeh

Population (2016)
  - Total: 492
- Time zone: UTC+3:30 (IRST)

Qarah Gol-e Takhteh-ye Vasat (Persian: قره گل تخته وسط) (Note: Also romanized as Qarah Gol-e Takhteh-ye Vasaţ; also known as Qarah Gol-e Takht-e Vasaţ) is a village in Maraveh Tappeh Rural District of the Central District in Maraveh Tappeh County, Golestan province, Iran.

== Demographics ==
=== Population ===
At the time of the 2006 National Census, the village's population was 377 in 63 households, when it was in the former Maraveh Tappeh District of Kalaleh County. The following census in 2011 counted 422 people in 87 households, by which time the district had been separated from the county in the establishment of Maraveh Tappeh County. The rural district was transferred to the new Central District, and the village was listed as Qarqijeq. The 2016 census measured the population of the village as 492 people in 115 households.
