= Haft Dasht-e Olya =

Haft Dasht-e Olya هفت دشت عليا
- Village
- Location within Iran
- Coordinates: 30°03′30″N 51°05′31″E
- Country: Iran
- Province: Fars
- County: Mamasani
- Bakhsh: Mahvarmilani
- Rural District: Mahur

Population (2006)
  - Total: 45
- Time zone: UTC+3:30 (IRST)
  - Summer (DST): UTC+4:30 (IRDT)

Haft Dasht-e Olya (Persian: هفت دشت عليا, also Romanized as Haft Dasht-e 'Olyā; also known as Haft Dasht-e Bālā) is a village in Mahur Rural District, Mahvarmilani District, Mamasani County, Fars province, Iran. At the 2006 census, its population was 45, in 10 families.
