= Tang-e Kur =

Tang-e Kur تنگ كور
- Village
- Location within Iran
- Coordinates: 29°56′02″N 50°46′47″E
- Country: Iran
- Province: Fars
- County: Mamasani
- Bakhsh: Mahvarmilani
- Rural District: Mishan

Population (2006)
  - Total: 32
- Time zone: UTC+3:30 (IRST)
  - Summer (DST): UTC+4:30 (IRDT)

Tang-e Kur (Persian: تنگ كور, also Romanized as Tang-e Kūr and Tang Kūr) is a village in Mishan Rural District, Mahvarmilani District, Mamasani County, Fars province, Iran. At the 2006 census, its population was 32, in 9 families.
