= Shirganji =

Shirganji شيرگنجي
- Village
- Location within Iran
- Coordinates: 29°50′48″N 51°02′58″E
- Country: Iran
- Province: Fars
- County: Mamasani
- Bakhsh: Mahvarmilani
- Rural District: Mishan

Population (2006)
  - Total: 31
- Time zone: UTC+3:30 (IRST)
  - Summer (DST): UTC+4:30 (IRDT)

Shirganji (Persian: شيرگنجي, also Romanized as Shīrganjī) is a village in Mishan Rural District, Mahvarmilani District, Mamasani County, Fars province, Iran. At the 2006 census, its population was 31, in 10 families.
