= Mashil Bandar-e Do =

Mashil Bandar-e Do مشيل بندردو
- Village
- Location within Iran
- Coordinates: 30°01′23″N 51°20′28″E
- Country: Iran
- Province: Fars
- County: Mamasani
- Bakhsh: Mahvarmilani
- Rural District: Mahur

Population (2006)
  - Total: 16
- Time zone: UTC+3:30 (IRST)
  - Summer (DST): UTC+4:30 (IRDT)

Mashil Bandar-e Do (Persian: مشيل بندردو, also Romanized as Mashīl Bandar-e Do) is a village in Mahur Rural District, Mahvarmilani District, Mamasani County, Fars province, Iran. At the 2006 census, its population was 16, in 5 families.
