= Qarnaveh =

Qarnaveh (Persian: قرناوه) may refer to:

- Qarnaveh-ye Olya
- Qarnaveh-ye Sofla
