= Aq Taqeh-ye Jadid =

Village in Golestan province, Iran

Aq Taqeh-ye Jadid Persian: آق تقه جديد
- Village
- Location within Iran
- Coordinates: 37°59′40″N 55°38′39″E
- Country: Iran
- Province: Golestan
- County: Maraveh Tappeh
- District: Central
- Rural District: Maraveh Tappeh

Population (2016)
  - Total: 1,702
- Time zone: UTC+3:30 (IRST)

Aq Taqeh-ye Jadid (Persian: آق تقه جديد) (Note: Also romanized as Āq Taqeh-ye Jadīd) is a village in Maraveh Tappeh Rural District of the Central District in Maraveh Tappeh County, Golestan province, Iran.

== Demographics ==
=== Population ===
At the time of the 2006 National Census, the village's population was 1,396 in 251 households, when it was in the former Maraveh Tappeh District of Kalaleh County. The following census in 2011 counted 1,627 people in 368 households, by which time the district had been separated from the county in the establishment of Maraveh Tappeh County. The rural district was transferred to the new Central District. The 2016 census measured the population of the village as 1,702 people in 440 households. It was the most populous village in its rural district.
