= Dim Zelleh =

Dim Zelleh ديم ظله
- Village
- Location within Iran
- Coordinates: 30°05′26″N 51°20′26″E
- Country: Iran
- Province: Fars
- County: Mamasani
- Bakhsh: Mahvarmilani
- Rural District: Mahur

Population (2006)
  - Total: 45
- Time zone: UTC+3:30 (IRST)
  - Summer (DST): UTC+4:30 (IRDT)

Dim Zelleh (Persian: ديم ظله, also Romanized as Dīm Z̧elleh and Dīm Z̄elleh) is a village in Mahur Rural District, Mahvarmilani District, Mamasani County, Fars province, Iran. At the 2006 census, its population was 45, in 7 families.
