= Kuruk =

Village in Golestan province, Iran

Kuruk Persian: كوروك
- Village
- Location within Iran
- Coordinates: 37°37′37″N 55°42′47″E
- Country: Iran
- Province: Golestan
- County: Maraveh Tappeh
- District: Golidagh
- Rural District: Shalami

Population (2016)
  - Total: 171
- Time zone: UTC+3:30 (IRST)

Kuruk (Persian: كوروك) (Note: Also romanized as Kūrūk; also known as Korūk and Qūryūg) is a village in Shalami Rural District of Golidagh District in Maraveh Tappeh County, Golestan province, Iran.

== Demographics ==
=== Population ===
At the time of the 2006 National Census, the village's population was 428 in 80 households, when it was in Zavkuh Rural District of the Central District in Kalaleh County. The following census in 2011 counted 193 people in 53 households, by which time the village had been separated from the county in the establishment of Maraveh Tappeh County. Kuruk was transferred to Shalami Rural District created in the new Golidagh District. The 2016 census measured the population of the village as 171 people in 57 households.
