= Qarah Gol-e Sharqi =

Village in Golestan province, Iran

Qarah Gol-e Sharqi Persian: قره گل شرقي
- Village
- Location within Iran
- Coordinates: 37°55′15″N 55°38′05″E
- Country: Iran
- Province: Golestan
- County: Maraveh Tappeh
- District: Central
- Rural District: Maraveh Tappeh

Population (2016)
  - Total: 863
- Time zone: UTC+3:30 (IRST)

Qarah Gol-e Sharqi (Persian: قره گل شرقي) (Note: Also romanized as Qarah Gol-e Sharqī; also known as Qarah Gol and Qareh Gol) is a village in Maraveh Tappeh Rural District of the Central District in Maraveh Tappeh County, Golestan province, Iran.

== Demographics ==
=== Population ===
At the time of the 2006 National Census, the village's population was 692 in 120 households, when it was in the former Maraveh Tappeh District of Kalaleh County. The following census in 2011 counted 742 people in 153 households, by which time the district had been separated from the county in the establishment of Maraveh Tappeh County. The rural district was transferred to the new Central District. The 2016 census measured the population of the village as 863 people in 223 households.
