= Baq Qajeh-ye Pain =

Village in Golestan province, Iran

Baq Qajeh-ye Pain Persian: بق قجه پائين
- Village
- Location within Iran
- Coordinates: 37°37′36″N 55°48′40″E
- Country: Iran
- Province: Golestan
- County: Maraveh Tappeh
- District: Golidagh
- Rural District: Golidagh

Population (2016)
  - Total: 627
- Time zone: UTC+3:30 (IRST)

Baq Qajeh-ye Pain (Persian: بق قجه پائين) (Note: Also romanized as Baq Qājeh-ye Pā’īn; also known as Buqajeh-ye Pain, also romanized as Būqājeh-ye Pā’īn) is a village in Golidagh Rural District of Golidagh District in Maraveh Tappeh County, Golestan province, Iran.

== Demographics ==
=== Population ===
At the time of the 2006 National Census, the village's population was 494 in 104 households, when it was in the former Maraveh Tappeh District of Kalaleh County. The following census in 2011 counted 574 people in 146 households, by which time the district had been separated from the county in the establishment of Maraveh Tappeh County. The rural district was transferred to the new Golidagh District. The 2016 census measured the population of the village as 627 people in 169 households.
