= Manuchehr Abbasi =

Manuchehr Abbasi منوچهرعباسي
- Village
- Country: Iran
- Province: Fars
- County: Mamasani
- Bakhsh: Mahvarmilani
- Rural District: Mahur

Population (2006)
  - Total: 26
- Time zone: UTC+3:30 (IRST)
  - Summer (DST): UTC+4:30 (IRDT)

Manuchehr Abbasi (Persian: منوچهرعباسي, also Romanized as Manūchehr 'Abbāsī) is a village in Mahur Rural District, Mahvarmilani District, Mamasani County, Fars province, Iran. At the 2006 census, its population was 26, in 7 families.
