= Dasht-e Kangari =

Dasht-e Kangari (Persian: دشت كنگري) may refer to:

- Dasht-e Kangari, Mamasani
- Dasht-e Kangari, Mahvarmilani, Mamasani County
