= Aq Chatal =

Village in Golestan province, Iran

Aq Chatal Persian: آق چاتال
- Village
- Location within Iran
- Coordinates: 37°39′59″N 55°39′21″E
- Country: Iran
- Province: Golestan
- County: Maraveh Tappeh
- District: Golidagh
- Rural District: Shalami

Population (2016)
  - Total: 397
- Time zone: UTC+3:30 (IRST)

Aq Chatal (Persian: آق چاتال) (Note: Also romanized as Āq Chatal) is a village in Shalami Rural District of Golidagh District in Maraveh Tappeh County, Golestan province, Iran.

== Demographics ==
=== Population ===
At the time of the 2006 National Census, the village's population was 333 in 63 households, when it was in Zavkuh Rural District of the Central District in Kalaleh County. The following census in 2011 counted 331 people in 89 households, by which time the village had been separated from the county in the establishment of Maraveh Tappeh County. Aq Chatal was transferred to Shalami Rural District created in the new Golidagh District. The 2016 census measured the population of the village as 397 people in 109 households.
