= Qarah Gol-e Kalleh =

Village in Golestan province, Iran

Qarah Gol-e Kalleh Persian: قره گل كله
- Village
- Location within Iran
- Coordinates: 37°55′12″N 55°39′10″E
- Country: Iran
- Province: Golestan
- County: Maraveh Tappeh
- District: Central
- Rural District: Maraveh Tappeh

Population (2016)
  - Total: 496
- Time zone: UTC+3:30 (IRST)

Qarah Gol-e Kalleh (Persian: قره گل كله) is a village in Maraveh Tappeh Rural District of the Central District in Maraveh Tappeh County, Golestan province, Iran.

== Demographics ==
=== Population ===
At the time of the 2006 National Census, the village's population was 513 in 98 households, when it was in the former Maraveh Tappeh District of Kalaleh County. The following census in 2011 counted 627 people in 138 households, by which time the district had been separated from the county in the establishment of Maraveh Tappeh County. The rural district was transferred to the new Central District. The 2016 census measured the population of the village as 496 people in 129 households.
