= Alti Aghaj =

Alti Aghaj or Alti Aqaj (Persian: التي اغاج) may refer to:

- Alti Aghaj-e Bozorg, a village in Iran
- Alti Aghaj-e Kuchak, a village in Iran
