= Kapan (disambiguation) =

Kapan may refer to:

- Kapan, Armenia, a town
  - Kapan Airport
  - Kapan Futsal, a professional futsal club
  - Kapan mine, a gold mine
  - Kapan Municipality
  - Kingdom of Syunik, sometimes called the Kingdom of Kapan
- Geben, Kahramanmaraş, referred to in medieval times as Kapan, a town in Turkey
- Kapan, Nepal, a village
- Kapan Han, a han in the Old Bazaar of Skopje, North Macedonia

== See also ==
- Qapan (disambiguation), places in Iran
