= Sharlaq, Maraveh Tappeh =

Coordinates: 37.6350°N 55.9367°E

Sharlaq شارلق
- Village
- Interactive map of Sharlaq
- Country: Iran
- Province: Golestan
- County: Maraveh Tappeh
- Bakhsh: Central
- Rural District: Maraveh Tappeh

Population (2006)
  - Total: 171
- Time zone: UTC+3:30 (IRST)
  - Summer (DST): UTC+4:30 (IRDT)

Sharlaq (Persian: شارلق, also Romanized as Shārlaq) is a village in Maraveh Tappeh Rural District, in the Central District of Maraveh Tappeh County, Golestan Province, Iran. At the 2006 census, its population was 171, in 36 families.
