= Owdli Shakestan =

Owdli Shakestan اودلي شكستان
- Village
- Country: Iran
- Province: Fars
- County: Mamasani
- Bakhsh: Mahvarmilani
- Rural District: Mahur

Population (2006)
  - Total: 9
- Time zone: UTC+3:30 (IRST)
  - Summer (DST): UTC+4:30 (IRDT)

Owdli Shakestan (Persian: اودلي شكستان, also Romanized as Owdlī Shakestān) is a village in Mahur Rural District, Mahvarmilani District, Mamasani County, Fars province, Iran. At the 2006 census, its population was 9, in 4 families.
