= Sharlaq =

Sharlaq (Persian: شارلق) may refer to:

- Sharlaq, Maraveh Tappeh
- Sharlaq, Golidagh, Maraveh Tappeh
