= Neza (disambiguation) =

Ciudad Nezahualcóyotl, commonly abbreviated as Neza, is a municipality in the State of Mexico, Mexico.

Neza may also refer to:

- Neza (singer) (b. 1986), a Rwandan-Canadian singer
- Neza e Sultan, an extinct volcano in Pakistan
- Neza-e Kuchek, a village in Fars Province, Iran
- Neza-e Olya, a village in Fars Province, Iran
