= Quch Khvos =

Quch Khvos قوچ خوس
- Village
- Location within Iran
- Coordinates: 30°04′21″N 51°14′53″E
- Country: Iran
- Province: Fars
- County: Mamasani
- Bakhsh: Mahvarmilani
- Rural District: Mahur

Population (2006)
  - Total: 35
- Time zone: UTC+3:30 (IRST)
  - Summer (DST): UTC+4:30 (IRDT)

Quch Khvos (Persian: قوچ خوس, also Romanized as Qūch Khvos; also known as Dalvar-e Kūch Khows) is a village in Mahur Rural District, Mahvarmilani District, Mamasani County, Fars province, Iran. At the 2006 census, its population was 35, in 7 families.
