= Buqajeh =

Buqajeh (Persian: بق قجه) may refer to:

- Buqajeh-ye Bala
- Buqajeh-ye Pain
