= Gerdanbeh =

Gerdanbeh گردنبه
- Village
- Location within Iran
- Coordinates: 29°53′46″N 51°25′24″E
- Country: Iran
- Province: Fars
- County: Mamasani
- Bakhsh: Mahvarmilani
- Rural District: Mahur

Population (2006)
  - Total: 63
- Time zone: UTC+3:30 (IRST)
  - Summer (DST): UTC+4:30 (IRDT)

Gerdanbeh (Persian: گردنبه) is a village in Mahur Rural District, Mahvarmilani District, Mamasani County, Fars province, Iran. At the 2006 census, its population was 63, in 20 families.
