= Sharlaq, Golidagh =

Village in Golestan province, Iran

Sharlaq Persian: شارلق
- Village
- Location within Iran
- Coordinates: 37°38′07″N 55°56′06″E
- Country: Iran
- Province: Golestan
- County: Maraveh Tappeh
- District: Golidagh
- Rural District: Golidagh

Population (2016)
  - Total: 721
- Time zone: UTC+3:30 (IRST)

Sharlaq (Persian: شارلق) (Note: Also romanized as Shārlaq and Sharloq) is a village in Golidagh Rural District of Golidagh District in Maraveh Tappeh County, Golestan province, Iran.

== Demographics ==
=== Population ===
At the time of the 2006 National Census, the village's population was 442 in 72 households, when it was in the former Maraveh Tappeh District of Kalaleh County. The following census in 2011 counted 720 people in 195 households, by which time the district had been separated from the county in the establishment of Maraveh Tappeh County. The rural district was transferred to the new Golidagh District. The 2016 census measured the population of the village as 721 people in 192 households.
