= Gach Tahmasabi =

Gach Tahmasabi گچ طهماسبي
- Village
- Country: Iran
- Province: Fars
- County: Mamasani
- Bakhsh: Mahvarmilani
- Rural District: Mahur

Population (2006)
  - Total: 20
- Time zone: UTC+3:30 (IRST)
  - Summer (DST): UTC+4:30 (IRDT)

Gach Tahmasabi (Persian: گچ طهماسبي, also Romanized as Gach Ţahmāsabī) is a village in Mahur Rural District, Mahvarmilani District, Mamasani County, Fars province, Iran. At the 2006 census, its population was 20, in 5 families.
