= Shah Taslim-e Olya =

Shah Taslim-e Olya شاه تسليم عليا
- Village
- Location within Iran
- Coordinates: 30°05′59″N 50°57′31″E
- Country: Iran
- Province: Fars
- County: Mamasani
- Bakhsh: Mahvarmilani
- Rural District: Mishan

Population (2006)
  - Total: 52
- Time zone: UTC+3:30 (IRST)
  - Summer (DST): UTC+4:30 (IRDT)

Shah Taslim-e Olya (Persian: شاه تسليم عليا, also Romanized as Shāh Taslīm-e 'Olyā; also known as Shāh Taslīm and Shāh Taslīm-e Bālā) is a village in Mishan Rural District, Mahvarmilani District, Mamasani County, Fars province, Iran. At the 2006 census, its population was 52, in 11 families.
