= Qapan =

Qapan or Kapan or Qupan (Persian: قپان) may refer to:

- Qapan-e Olya
- Qapan-e Sofla
