= Barm-e Siah =

Village in Fars province, Iran

Barm-e Siah Persian: برم سياه
- Village
- Location within Iran
- Coordinates: 30°00′17″N 51°27′57″E
- Country: Iran
- Province: Fars
- County: Mamasani
- District: Mahur Milani
- Rural District: Mahur

Population (2016)
  - Total: 769
- Time zone: UTC+3:30 (IRST)

Barm-e Siah (Persian: برمسياه) (Note: Also romanized as Barm Sīyāh and Barm-e Sīāh; also known as Barm-e Seyāh Shūr) is a village in Mahur Rural District of Mahur Milani District, Mamasani County, Fars province, Iran.

== Demographics ==
=== Population ===
At the time of the 2006 National Census, the village's population was 911 in 182 households. The following census in 2011 counted 856 people in 205 households. The 2016 census measured the population of the village as 769 people in 222 households. It was the most populous village in its rural district.
