= Kasan =

Kasan or Kassan may refer to:

== Places ==
- Kasan, Iran, a village in Gilan Province, Iran
- Kāsān, a village in Gilan Province, Iran

== Other uses ==
- KernelAddressSanitizer (KASAN), a Linux kernel feature
- 1316 Kasan, a Mars-crossing asteroid
- Christel Happach-Kasan (born 1950), German politician
- Kasan Soleh (born 1982), Indonesian association football player

== See also ==
- Kazan (disambiguation)
- Kesan, a village in Golestan Province, Iran
- Kushan (clan), Kasan clan
- Kassanda, Place in Central Region, Uganda
