= Golidagh =

City in Golestan province, Iran

Golidagh Persian: گليداغ
- City
- Location within Iran
- Coordinates: 37°38′28″N 55°56′42″E
- Country: Iran
- Province: Golestan
- County: Maraveh Tappeh
- District: Golidagh
- Established as a city: 2011

Population (2016)
  - Total: 2,019
- Time zone: UTC+3:30 (IRST)

Golidagh (Persian: گليداغ) (Note: Also romanized as Goli Dagh, Golī Dāgh, and Golīdāgh; also known as Shahrak-e Golīdāgh) is a city in, and the capital of, Golidagh District in Maraveh Tappeh County, Golestan province, Iran. It also serves as the administrative center for Golidagh Rural District.

== Demographics ==
=== Population ===
At the time of the 2006 National Census, Golidagh's population was 1,623 in 343 households, when it was a village in Golidagh Rural District of the former Maraveh Tappeh District in Kalaleh County. The following census in 2011 counted 2,091 people in 433 households, by which time the district had been separated from the county in the establishment of Maraveh Tappeh County. The rural district was transferred to the new Golidagh District. The 2016 census measured the population of the village as 2,109 people in 515 households.

The village of Golidagh was converted to a city in 2011.
