= Khujehlar, Maraveh Tappeh =

Village in Golestan province, Iran

Khujehlar Persian: خوجه لر
- Village
- Location within Iran
- Coordinates: 37°37′45″N 55°44′24″E
- Country: Iran
- Province: Golestan
- County: Maraveh Tappeh
- District: Golidagh
- Rural District: Shalami

Population (2016)
  - Total: 56
- Time zone: UTC+3:30 (IRST)

Khujehlar (Persian: خوجه لر) (Note: Also romanized as Khūjahlar and Khūjehlar) is a village in Shalami Rural District of Golidagh District in Maraveh Tappeh County, Golestan province, Iran.

== Demographics ==
=== Population ===
At the time of the 2006 National Census, the village's population was 125 in 23 households, when it was in Zavkuh Rural District of the Central District in Kalaleh County. The following census in 2011 counted 68 people in 16 households, by which time the village had been separated from the county in the establishment of Maraveh Tappeh County. Khujehlar was transferred to Shalami Rural District created in the new Golidagh District. The 2016 census measured the population of the village as 56 people in 17 households.
