= Morgh-e Kuchak =

Morgh-e Kuchak مرغ كوچك
- Village
- Location within Iran
- Coordinates: 30°02′15″N 51°23′53″E
- Country: Iran
- Province: Fars
- County: Mamasani
- Bakhsh: Mahvarmilani
- Rural District: Mahur

Population (2006)
  - Total: 58
- Time zone: UTC+3:30 (IRST)
  - Summer (DST): UTC+4:30 (IRDT)

Morgh-e Kuchak (Persian: مرغ كوچك, also Romanized as Morgh-e Kūchak and Morgh-e Kūchek) is a village in Mahur Rural District, Mahvarmilani District, Mamasani County, Fars province, Iran. At the 2006 census, its population was 58, in 13 families.
