= Palizan Rural District =

Rural district in Golestan province, Iran

Palizan Rural District Persian: دهستان پالیزان
- Rural District
- Location within Iran
- Coordinates: 37°57′N 56°09′E
- Country: Iran
- Province: Golestan
- County: Maraveh Tappeh
- District: Central
- Established: 2007
- Capital: Qazan Qayeh

Population (2016)
  - Total: 9,289
- Time zone: UTC+3:30 (IRST)

Palizan Rural District (Persian: دهستان پالیزان) is in the Central District of Maraveh Tappeh County, Golestan province, Iran. Its capital is the village of Qazan Qayeh.

== History ==
In 2007, Maraveh Tappeh District was separated from Kalaleh County in the establishment of Maraveh Tappeh County, and Palizan Rural District was created in the new Central District.

== Demographics ==
=== Population ===
At the time of the 2011 census, the rural district's population was 8,284 in 1,893 households. The 2016 census measured the population of the rural district as 9,289 in 2,494 households. The most populous of its 25 villages was Qazan Qayeh, with 1,992 people.

=== Other villages in the rural district ===
- Allah Nur
- Aq Qaleh
- Aqlar
- Atajan Qorbanli
- Baqi
- Bastam Darreh
- Dadli-ye Qazneyn
- Dowlat Owrlan
- Farq Sar-e Pain
- Gavandar
- Guk Darreh
- Mardom Darreh
- Mohammad Shahir
- Palcheqli Yamut
- Post Darreh-ye Pain
- Qusheh Tappeh
- Sheykhlar-e Sofla
- Ternavoli-ye Pain
- Yekkeh Tappeh
- Yekkeh Tut-e Pain
