= Morgh-e Bozorg =

Morgh-e Bozorg)- مرغ ماهور/ مرغ بزرگ
- Village
- Location within Iran
- Coordinates: 30°00′44″N 51°25′10″E
- Country: Iran
- Province: Fars
- County: Mamasani
- Bakhsh: Mahvarmilani
- Rural District: Mahur

Population (2020)
  - Total: 895
- Time zone: UTC+3:30 (IRST)
  - Summer (DST): UTC+4:30 (IRDT)

Morgh-e Bozorg (Persian: مرغ بزرگ) is a village in Mahur Rural District, Mahvarmilani District, Mamasani County, Fars province, Iran. At the 2006 census, its population was 492, in 106 families.
