= Shalami Rural District =

Rural district in Golestan province, Iran

Shalami Rural District Persian: دهستان شلمی
- Rural District
- Location within Iran
- Coordinates: 37°41′N 55°49′E
- Country: Iran
- Province: Golestan
- County: Maraveh Tappeh
- District: Golidagh
- Established: 2007
- Capital: Arab Qarri Hajji

Population (2016)
  - Total: 12,041
- Time zone: UTC+3:30 (IRST)

Shalami Rural District (Persian: دهستان شلمی) is in Golidagh District of Maraveh Tappeh County, Golestan province, Iran. Its capital is the village of Arab Qarri Hajji.

== History ==
n 2007, Maraveh Tappeh District was separated from Kalaleh County in the establishment of Maraveh Tappeh County, and Shalami Rural District was created in the new Golidagh District.

== Demographics ==
=== Population ===
At the time of the 2011 census, the rural district's population was 11,776 in 2,768 households. The 2016 census measured the population of the rural district as 12,041 in 3,286 households. The most populous of its 26 villages was Aq Emam, with 1,624 people.

=== Other villages in the rural district ===
- Alti Aghaj-e Bozorg
- Alti Aghaj-e Kuchak
- Aq Chatal
- Aq Toqeh
- Chatal
- Chenarli
- Cheshmeh Li
- Kachik
- Karim Ishan
- Khujehlar
- Kuruk
- Meydan-e Jigh-e Kuchak
- Parcheqli
- Qapan-e Olya
- Qapan-e Sofla
- Qarnaveh-ye Olya
- Qarnaveh-ye Sofla
- Qernaq
- Ucheran
- Sujeq
