= Dasht-e Kangari, Mahvarmilani =

Dasht-e Kangari دشت كنگري
- Village
- Country: Iran
- Province: Fars
- County: Mamasani
- Bakhsh: Mahvarmilani
- Rural District: Mishan

Population (2006)
  - Total: 38
- Time zone: UTC+3:30 (IRST)
  - Summer (DST): UTC+4:30 (IRDT)

Dasht-e Kangari (Persian: دشت كنگري, also Romanized as Dasht-e Kangarī) is a village in Mishan Rural District, Mahvarmilani District, Mamasani County, Fars province, Iran. At the 2006 census, its population was 38, in 11 families.
