= Chatal, Iran =

Village in Golestan province, Iran

Chatal Persian: چاتال
- Village
- Location within Iran
- Coordinates: 37°37′56″N 55°42′00″E
- Country: Iran
- Province: Golestan
- County: Maraveh Tappeh
- District: Golidagh
- Rural District: Shalami

Population (2016)
  - Total: 313
- Time zone: UTC+3:30 (IRST)

Chatal (Persian: چاتال) (Note: Also romanized as Chātāl) is a village in Shalami Rural District of Golidagh District in Maraveh Tappeh County, Golestan province, Iran.

== Demographics ==
=== Population ===
At the time of the 2006 National Census, the village's population was 408 in 79 households, when it was in Zavkuh Rural District of the Central District in Kalaleh County. The following census in 2011 counted 310 people in 80 households, by which time the village had been separated from the county in the establishment of Maraveh Tappeh County. Chatal was transferred to Shalami Rural District created in the new Golidagh District. The 2016 census measured the population of the village as 313 people in 95 households.
