= Tovah Khoshkeh =

Tovah Khoshkeh or Toveh Khoshkeh (Persian: توه خشكه) may refer to:

- Toveh Khoshkeh, Kermanshah
- Tovah Khoshkeh, Salas-e Babajani, Kermanshah Province
- Tovah Khoshkeh, Lorestan
