= Khujehlar =

Khujehlar (Persian: خوجه لر) may refer to:

- Khujehlar, Kalaleh
- Khujehlar, Pishkamar
