= Neza-e Olya =

Neza-e Olya نزاع عليا
- Village
- Location within Iran
- Coordinates: 30°02′20″N 50°57′23″E
- Country: Iran
- Province: Fars
- County: Mamasani
- Bakhsh: Mahvarmilani
- Rural District: Mishan

Population (2006)
  - Total: 56
- Time zone: UTC+3:30 (IRST)
  - Summer (DST): UTC+4:30 (IRDT)

Neza-e Olya (Persian: نزاع عليا, also Romanized as Nezā'-e 'Olyā) is a village in Mishan Rural District, Mahvarmilani District, Mamasani County, Fars province, Iran. At the 2006 census, its population was 56, in 15 families.
