= Qapan-e Sofla =

Village in Golestan province, Iran

Qapan-e Sofla Persian: قپان سفلي
- Village
- Location within Iran
- Coordinates: 37°36′16″N 55°39′05″E
- Country: Iran
- Province: Golestan
- County: Maraveh Tappeh
- District: Golidagh
- Rural District: Shalami

Population (2016)
  - Total: 186
- Time zone: UTC+3:30 (IRST)

Qapan-e Sofla (Persian: قپان سفلي) (Note: Also romanized as Qapān-e Soflá; also known as Kapan, Qapān, Qapān-e Pā’īn, and Qupan) is a village in Shalami Rural District of Golidagh District in Maraveh Tappeh County, Golestan province, Iran.

== Demographics ==
=== Population ===
At the time of the 2006 National Census, the village's population was 210 in 33 households, when it was in Zavkuh Rural District of the Central District in Kalaleh County. The following census in 2011 counted 172 people in 56 households, by which time the village had been separated from the county in the establishment of Maraveh Tappeh County. Qapan-e Sofla was transferred to Shalami Rural District created in the new Golidagh District. The 2016 census measured the population of the village as 186 people in 54 households.
