= Mishan-e Olya, Fars =

Village in Fars province, Iran

Mishan-e Olya Persian: ميشان عليا
- Village
- Location within Iran
- Coordinates: 29°59′20″N 50°57′07″E
- Country: Iran
- Province: Fars
- County: Mamasani
- District: Mahur Milani
- Rural District: Mishan

Population (2016)
  - Total: 561
- Time zone: UTC+3:30 (IRST)

Mishan-e Olya (Persian: ميشان عليا) (Note: Also romanized as Mīshān-e ‘Olyā; also known as Mīshān) is a village in, and the capital of, Mishan Rural District of Mahur Milani District, Mamasani County, Fars province, Iran.

== Demographics ==
=== Population ===
At the time of the 2006 National Census, the village's population was 618 in 141 households. The following census in 2011 counted 584 people in 155 households. The 2016 census measured the population of the village as 561 people in 153 households. It was the most populous village in its rural district.
