= Neza-e Kuchek =

Neza-e Kuchek نزاع كوچك
- Village
- Location within Iran
- Coordinates: 30°02′12″N 50°57′42″E
- Country: Iran
- Province: Fars
- County: Mamasani
- Bakhsh: Mahvarmilani
- Rural District: Mishan

Population (2006)
  - Total: 24
- Time zone: UTC+3:30 (IRST)
  - Summer (DST): UTC+4:30 (IRDT)

Neza-e Kuchek (Persian: نزاع كوچك, also Romanized as Nezā'-e Kūchek; also known as Nezā'-e Soflá and Qal‘eh Kohneh) is a village in Mishan Rural District, Mahvarmilani District, Mamasani County, Fars province, Iran. At the 2006 census, its population was 24, in 6 families.
