= Qapan-e Olya =

Village in Golestan province, Iran

Qapan-e Olya Persian: قپان عليا
- Village
- Location within Iran
- Coordinates: 37°37′14″N 55°40′20″E
- Country: Iran
- Province: Golestan
- County: Maraveh Tappeh
- District: Golidagh
- Rural District: Shalami

Population (2016)
  - Total: 542
- Time zone: UTC+3:30 (IRST)

Qapan-e Olya (Persian: قپان عليا) (Note: Also romanized as Qapān-e ‘Olyā; also known as ‘Alī Qapān and Qapān-e Bālā) is a village in Shalami Rural District of Golidagh District in Maraveh Tappeh County, Golestan province, Iran.

== Demographics ==
=== Population ===
At the time of the 2006 National Census, the village's population was 648 in 125 households, when it was in Zavkuh Rural District of the Central District in Kalaleh County. The following census in 2011 counted 535 people in 148 households, by which time the village had been separated from the county in the establishment of Maraveh Tappeh County. Qapan-e Olya was transferred to Shalami Rural District created in the new Golidagh District. The 2016 census measured the population of the village as 542 people in 165 households.
