= Aq Toqeh =

Village in Golestan province, Iran

Aq Toqeh Persian: آق تقه
- Village
- Location within Iran
- Coordinates: 37°59′42″N 55°38′37″E
- Country: Iran
- Province: Golestan
- County: Maraveh Tappeh
- District: Golidagh
- Rural District: Shalami

Population (2016)
  - Total: 310
- Time zone: UTC+3:30 (IRST)

Aq Toqeh (Persian: آق تقه( (Note: Also romanized as Āq Toqeh; also known as Āq Toqeh-ye Jadīd, Āq Tūqeh, Āqloqqeh, and Āqtūgeh) is a village in Shalami Rural District of Golidagh District in Maraveh Tappeh County, Golestan province, Iran.

== Demographics ==
=== Population ===
At the time of the 2006 National Census, the village's population was 461 in 98 households, when it was in Zavkuh Rural District of the Central District in Kalaleh County. The following census in 2011 counted 297 people in 70 households, by which time the village had been separated from the county in the establishment of Maraveh Tappeh County. Aq Toqeh was transferred to Shalami Rural District created in the new Golidagh District. The 2016 census measured the population of the village as 310 people in 83 households.
