= Dasht-e Murd, Mishan =

Dasht-e Murd دشتمورد
- Village
- Location within Iran
- Coordinates: 30°17′02″N 51°10′14″E
- Country: Iran
- Province: Fars
- County: Mamasani
- Bakhsh: Mahvarmilani
- Rural District: Mishan

Population (2006)
  - Total: 20
- Time zone: UTC+3:30 (IRST)
  - Summer (DST): UTC+4:30 (IRDT)

Dasht-e Murd (Persian: دشتمورد, also Romanized as Dasht-e Mūrd and Dasht-e Mowrd) is a village in Mishan Rural District, Mahvarmilani District, Mamasani County, Fars province, Iran. At the 2006 census, its population was 20, in 4 families.
