= Dasht-e Murd, Mahur =

Dasht-e Murd دشت مورد
- Village
- Location within Iran
- Coordinates: 30°04′53″N 51°15′21″E
- Country: Iran
- Province: Fars
- County: Mamasani
- Bakhsh: Mahvarmilani
- Rural District: Mahur

Population (2006)
  - Total: 34
- Time zone: UTC+3:30 (IRST)
  - Summer (DST): UTC+4:30 (IRDT)

Dasht-e Murd (Persian: دشت مورد, also Romanized as Dasht-e Mūrd) is a village in Mahur Rural District, Mahvarmilani District, Mamasani County, Fars province, Iran. At the 2006 census, its population was 34, in 8 families.
