= Chatal =

Chatal may refer to:

- Chatal, Afghanistan
- Chatal, Iran
- Ceatalchioi, Romania
