= Baba Monir =

City in Fars province, Iran

Baba Monir Persian: بابامنير
- City
- Location within Iran
- Coordinates: 30°04′21″N 51°12′21″E
- Country: Iran
- Province: Fars
- County: Mamasani
- District: Mahur Milani

Population (2016)
  - Total: 1,379
- Time zone: UTC+3:30 (IRST)

Baba Monir (Persian: بابامنير) (Note: Also romanized as Bābā Monir and Bābā Monīr; also known as Baba Munir) is a city in, and the capital of, Mahur Milani District of Mamasani County, Fars province, Iran. It also serves as the administrative center for Mahur Rural District.

== Demographics ==
=== Population ===
At the time of the 2006 National Census, Baba Monir's population was 1,501 in 351 households, when it was a village in Mahur Rural District. The following census in 2011 counted 1,764 people in 417 households. The 2016 census measured the population as 1,379 people in 388 households, by which time the village had been elevated to the status of a city.
