= Qareh Gol-e Olya =

Qareh Gol-e Olya قره گل عليا
- Village
- Location within Iran
- Coordinates: 29°51′30″N 51°04′01″E
- Country: Iran
- Province: Fars
- County: Mamasani
- Bakhsh: Mahvarmilani
- Rural District: Mishan

Population (2006)
  - Total: 19
- Time zone: UTC+3:30 (IRST)
  - Summer (DST): UTC+4:30 (IRDT)

Qareh Gol-e Olya (Persian: قره گل عليا, also Romanized as Qarah Gol-e 'Olyā; also known as Garagūā, Qareh Gol, and Qareh Golūl) is a small village in Mishan Rural District, Mahvarmilani District, Mamasani County, Fars province, Iran. During the 2006 census, its population was 19, with seven households.
