= Qareh Gol-e Sofla =

Qareh Gol-e Sofla قره گل سفلي
- Village
- Location within Iran
- Coordinates: 29°51′30″N 51°04′01″E
- Country: Iran
- Province: Fars
- County: Mamasani
- Bakhsh: Mahvarmilani
- Rural District: Mishan

Population (2006)
  - Total: 45
- Time zone: UTC+3:30 (IRST)
  - Summer (DST): UTC+4:30 (IRDT)

Qareh Gol-e Sofla (Persian: قره گل سفلي, also Romanized as Qarah Gol-e Soflá; also known as Garagūā, Qareh Gol, and Qareh Golūl) is a village in Mishan Rural District, Mahvarmilani District, Mamasani County, Fars province, Iran. At the 2006 census, its population was 45, in 10 families.
