= Tavil, East Azerbaijan =

Tavil طويل
- Village
- Location within Iran
- Coordinates: 38°46′04″N 46°40′46″E
- Country: Iran
- Province: East Azerbaijan
- County: Varzaqan
- Bakhsh: Central
- Rural District: Bakrabad

Population (2006)
  - Total: 112
- Time zone: UTC+3:30 (IRST)

Tavil (Persian: طويل, also Romanized as Ţavīl; also known as Ţaveh, Tivil’ and Tawal) is a village in Bakrabad Rural District, in the Central District of Varzaqan County, East Azerbaijan Province, Iran. At the 2006 census, its population was 112, in 18 families.
