= Dasht-e Mowrd-e Ghurak =

Dasht-e Mowrd-e Ghurak دشت موردغورك
- Village
- Location within Iran
- Coordinates: 30°17′02″N 51°10′14″E
- Country: Iran
- Province: Kohgiluyeh and Boyer-Ahmad
- County: Basht
- Bakhsh: Basht
- Rural District: Babuyi

Population (2006)
  - Total: 81
- Time zone: UTC+3:30 (IRST)
  - Summer (DST): UTC+4:30 (IRDT)

Dasht-e Mowrd-e Ghurak (Persian: دشت موردغورك, also Romanized as Dasht-e Mowrd-e Ghūrak; also known as Dasht-e Mowrd) is a village in Babuyi Rural District, Basht District, Basht County, Kohgiluyeh and Boyer-Ahmad Province, Iran. At the 2006 census, its population was 81, in 15 families.
