= Margh, South Khorasan =

Margh مرغ
- Village
- Location within Iran
- Coordinates: 32°48′22″N 59°10′48″E
- Country: Iran
- Province: South Khorasan
- County: Birjand
- Bakhsh: Central
- Rural District: Baqeran

Population (2016)
  - Total: 49
- Time zone: UTC+3:30 (IRST)
  - Summer (DST): UTC+4:30 (IRDT)

Margh (Persian: مرغ, also Romanized as Morgh and Marq) is a village in Baqeran Rural District, in the Central District of Birjand County, South Khorasan Province, Iran. At the 2016 census, its population was 49, in 17 families.
