= Maraveh Tappeh =

City in Golestan province, Iran

Maraveh Tappeh Persian: مراوه تپّه
- City
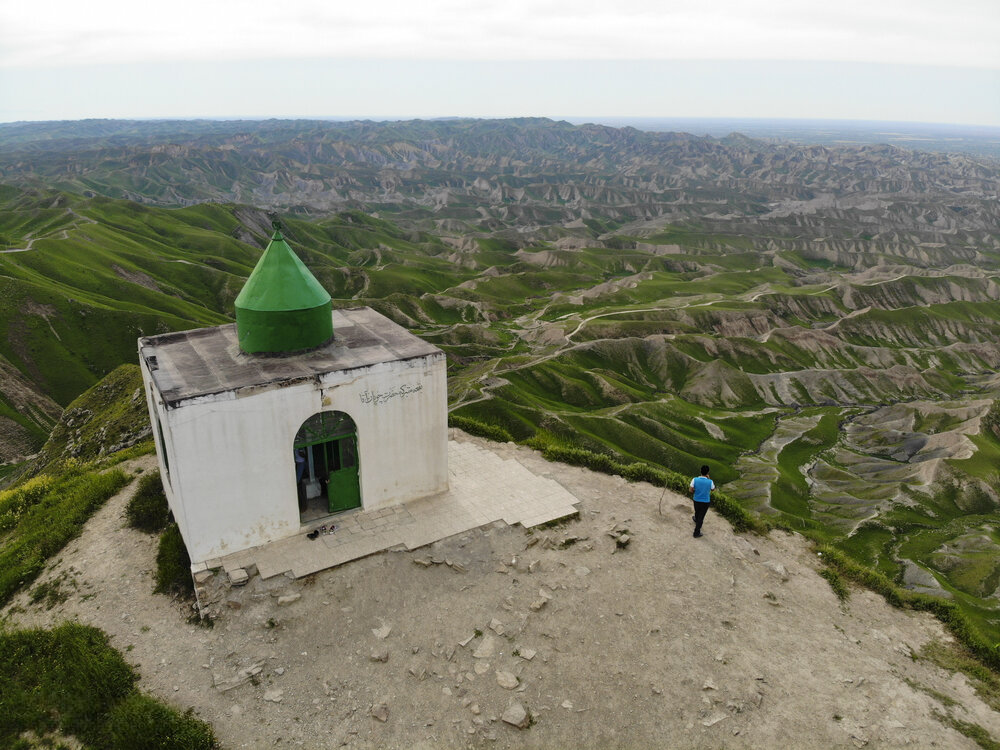
- Shrine at Khalid Nabi Cemetery near Maraveh Tappeh

- Location within Iran
- Coordinates: 37°54′11″N 55°57′24″E
- Country: Iran
- Province: Golestan
- County: Maraveh Tappeh
- District: Central

Population (2016)
  - Total: 8,671
- Time zone: UTC+3:30 (IRST)

Maraveh Tappeh (Persian: مراوه تپّه) (Note: Also romanized as Maravehtepe, Marveh Tappeh, and Morāveh Tappeh; also known as Maraveh (مَراوِه), also romanized as Marāveh) is a city in the Central District of Maraveh Tappeh County, Golestan province, Iran, serving as capital of both the county and the district. As a village, it was the capital of Maraveh Tappeh Rural District until its capital was transferred to the village of Suzesh.

== Demographics ==
=== Ethnicity and religion ===
The city was fully Turkmen in its ethnic composition and Hanafi Sunni Muslim in its religion. But as of late, it has been settled by a growing number of Khurasani Kurds of Shia Islamic religious persuasion. Consequently, the town now has a mixed ethnic and religious population of Sunni Turkmens and Shia Kurds.

=== Population ===
At the time of the 2006 National Census, the city's population was 5,602 in 1,147 households, when it was capital of the former Maraveh Tappeh District in Kalaleh County. The following census in 2011 counted 7,906 people in 1,664 households, by which time the district had been separated from the county in the establishment of Maraveh Tappeh County. Maraveh Tappeh was transferred to the new Central District as the county's capital. The 2016 census measured the population of the city as 8,671 people in 2,072 households.

== Climate ==
Maraveh Tappeh has a cold semi-arid climate (BSk) according to the Köppen climate classification.

Climate data for Maraveh Tappeh (1991–2020)
Month	Jan	Feb	Mar	Apr	May	Jun	Jul	Aug	Sep	Oct	Nov	Dec	Year
Record high °C (°F)	24.7 (76.5)	28.4 (83.1)	35.3 (95.5)	38.6 (101.5)	42.6 (108.7)	45.4 (113.7)	45.8 (114.4)	45.1 (113.2)	42.6 (108.7)	38.9 (102.0)	34.2 (93.6)	32.0 (89.6)	45.8 (114.4)
Mean daily maximum °C (°F)	11.2 (52.2)	12.2 (54.0)	16.0 (60.8)	21.2 (70.2)	28.0 (82.4)	33.1 (91.6)	34.7 (94.5)	34.8 (94.6)	30.6 (87.1)	24.5 (76.1)	17.1 (62.8)	13.1 (55.6)	23.0 (73.4)
Daily mean °C (°F)	7.0 (44.6)	7.5 (45.5)	11.1 (52.0)	15.8 (60.4)	21.9 (71.4)	26.5 (79.7)	28.4 (83.1)	28.6 (83.5)	24.8 (76.6)	18.9 (66.0)	12.4 (54.3)	8.8 (47.8)	17.6 (63.7)
Mean daily minimum °C (°F)	3.6 (38.5)	3.6 (38.5)	6.9 (44.4)	11.2 (52.2)	16.6 (61.9)	20.8 (69.4)	23.3 (73.9)	23.6 (74.5)	20.3 (68.5)	14.9 (58.8)	8.9 (48.0)	5.3 (41.5)	13.3 (55.9)
Record low °C (°F)	−12.0 (10.4)	−10.4 (13.3)	−2.2 (28.0)	0.0 (32.0)	4.8 (40.6)	9.4 (48.9)	15.2 (59.4)	15.2 (59.4)	11.4 (52.5)	3.4 (38.1)	−14.2 (6.4)	−4.4 (24.1)	−14.2 (6.4)
Average precipitation mm (inches)	36.2 (1.43)	44.5 (1.75)	54.0 (2.13)	44.3 (1.74)	22.8 (0.90)	16.8 (0.66)	16.4 (0.65)	11.7 (0.46)	17.0 (0.67)	31.3 (1.23)	35.2 (1.39)	33.0 (1.30)	363.2 (14.30)
Average precipitation days (≥ 1.0 mm)	5.7	6.6	7.5	5.9	3.3	1.9	1.5	1.5	1.7	3.4	5.2	5.4	49.6
Average relative humidity (%)	65.0	67.0	67.0	66.0	56.0	49.0	52.0	50.0	51.0	55.0	64.0	65.0	58.9
Average dew point °C (°F)	−0.1 (31.8)	0.7 (33.3)	3.9 (39.0)	8.2 (46.8)	11.4 (52.5)	13.5 (56.3)	16.5 (61.7)	15.7 (60.3)	12.9 (55.2)	8.4 (47.1)	4.7 (40.5)	1.4 (34.5)	8.1 (46.6)
Mean monthly sunshine hours	156	153	175	199	269	307	310	316	274	238	169	154	2,720
Source: NOAA
