= Dasht-e Kangari, Mamasani =

Dasht-e Kangari دشت كنگري
- Village
- Location within Iran
- Coordinates: 30°07′30″N 51°22′41″E
- Country: Iran
- Province: Fars
- County: Mamasani
- Bakhsh: Central
- Rural District: Bakesh-e Do

Population (2022)
  - Total: 55
- Time zone: UTC+3:30 (IRST)
  - Summer (DST): UTC+4:30 (IRDT)

Dasht-e Kangari (Persian: دشت كنگري, also Romanized as Dasht-e Kangarī) is a village in Bakesh-e Do Rural District, in the Central District of Mamasani County, Fars province, Iran. At the 2006 census, its population was 55, in 14 families.
