= Qarah Gol, Kurdistan =

Qarah Gol قره گل
- Village
- Location within Iran
- Coordinates: 36°12′37″N 46°35′25″E
- Country: Iran
- Province: Kurdistan
- County: Saqqez
- Bakhsh: Ziviyeh
- Rural District: Emam

Population (2006)
  - Total: 70
- Time zone: UTC+3:30 (IRST)
  - Summer (DST): UTC+4:30 (IRDT)

Qarah Gol (Persian: قره گل; also known as Qareh Gol-e Qūkh) is a village in Emam Rural District, Ziviyeh District, Saqqez County, Kurdistan Province, Iran. At the 2006 census, its population was 70, in 16 families. The village is populated by Kurds.
