= Tovah Khoshkeh, Salas-e Babajani =

Tovah Khoshkeh توه خشكه
- Village
- Location within Iran
- Coordinates: 34°44′14″N 45°51′13″E
- Country: Iran
- Province: Kermanshah
- County: Salas-e Babajani
- Bakhsh: Ozgoleh
- Rural District: Jeygaran

Population (2006)
  - Total: 70
- Time zone: UTC+3:30 (IRST)
  - Summer (DST): UTC+4:30 (IRDT)

Tovah Khoshkeh (Persian: توه خشكه; also known as Towoshkeh, Tū Khoshkeh, and Tūvashkeh) is a village in Jeygaran Rural District, Ozgoleh District, Salas-e Babajani County, Kermanshah Province, Iran. At the 2006 census, its population was 70, in 13 families.
