= Toveh Khoshkeh, Kermanshah =

Toveh Khoshkeh توه خشكه
- Village
- Location within Iran
- Coordinates: 33°57′49″N 46°56′57″E
- Country: Iran
- Province: Kermanshah
- County: Kermanshah
- Bakhsh: Firuzabad
- Rural District: Jalalvand

Population (2006)
  - Total: 53
- Time zone: UTC+3:30 (IRST)
  - Summer (DST): UTC+4:30 (IRDT)

Toveh Khoshkeh (Persian: توه خشكه; also known as Toveh Khoshkeh Jalālvand and Tū Khoshkeh) is a village in Jalalvand Rural District, Firuzabad District, Kermanshah County, Kermanshah Province, Iran. At the 2006 census, its population was 53, in 13 families.
