= Kapan mine =

Gold mine in Syunik, Armenia

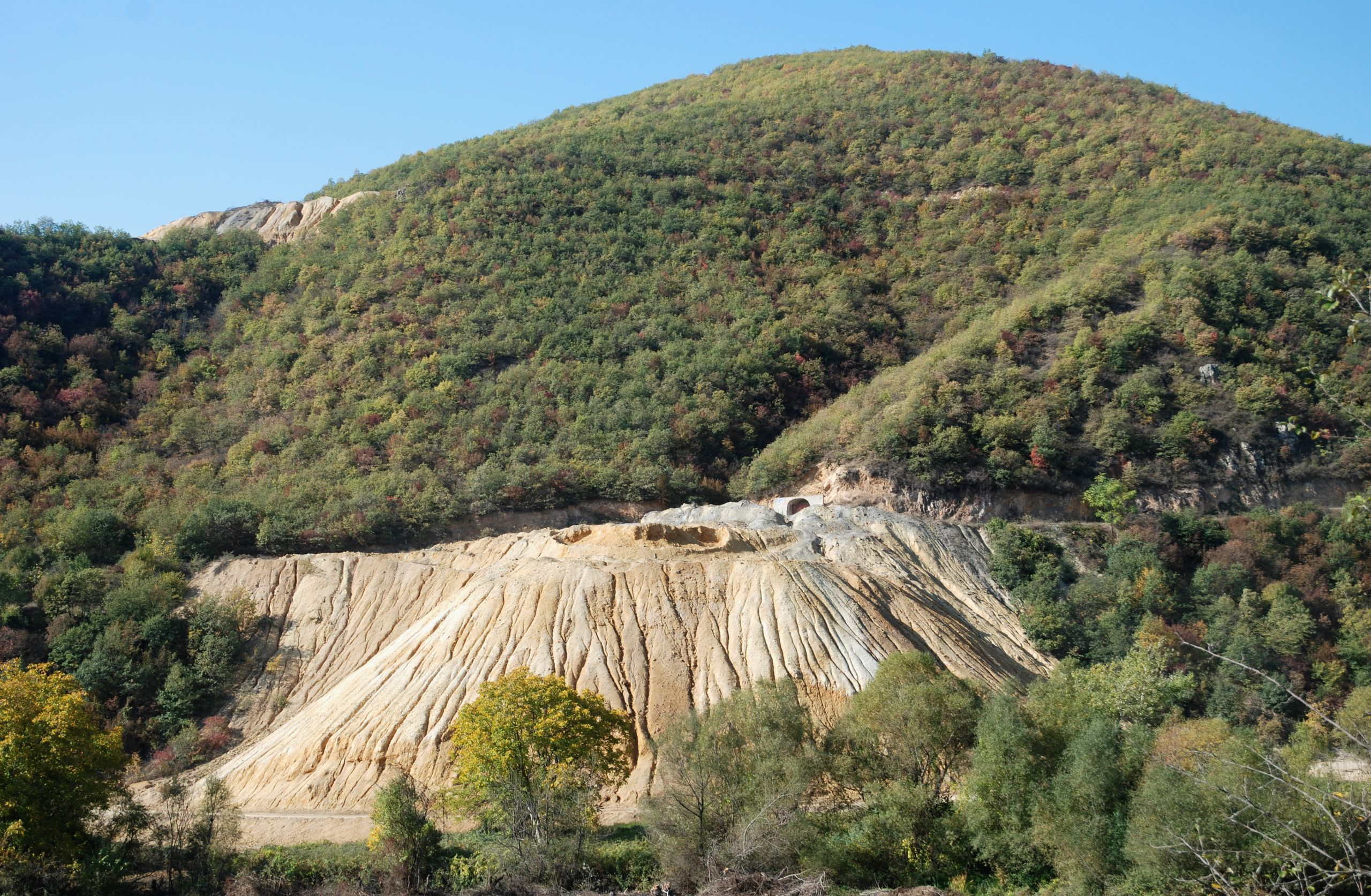
- Interactive map of Kapan mine
- Location: Syunik Province, Armenia
- Products: Gold, silver, copper, zinc

The Kapan mine is one of the largest gold mines in the Armenia. The mine is located in the south-east of the country in Syunik Province. The mine has estimated reserves of 5.15 million oz of gold and 95.6 million oz of silver. The mine also has ore reserves amounting to 335.8 million tonnes grading 0.11% copper and 0.41% zinc.

Mine is operated by “Kapan Mining and Processing Enterprise” CJSC.

Chaarat Gold Holdings Limited acquired 100% of shares of “Kapan Mining and Processing Enterprise” CJSC for US$55M from a company listed on the same stock exchange which is a subsidiary of Russian Polymetal Group.
