= Qarah Gol, Charuymaq =

Qarah Gol قره گل
- Village
- Location within Iran
- Coordinates: 37°19′21″N 46°56′31″E
- Country: Iran
- Province: East Azerbaijan
- County: Charuymaq
- Bakhsh: Central
- Rural District: Varqeh

Population (2006)
  - Total: 53
- Time zone: UTC+3:30 (IRST)
  - Summer (DST): UTC+4:30 (IRDT)

Qarah Gol (Persian: قره گل; also known as Qarah Gūl) is a village in Varqeh Rural District, in the Central District of Charuymaq County, East Azerbaijan Province, Iran. At the 2006 census, its population was 53, in 11 families.
