= Taveh Espid =

Taveh Espid طاوه اسپيد
- Village
- Location within Iran
- Coordinates: 30°50′33″N 50°59′04″E
- Country: Iran
- Province: Kohgiluyeh and Boyer-Ahmad
- County: Charam
- Bakhsh: Sarfaryab
- Rural District: Sarfaryab

Population (2006)
  - Total: 115
- Time zone: UTC+3:30 (IRST)
  - Summer (DST): UTC+4:30 (IRDT)

Taveh Espid (Persian: طاوه اسپيد, also Romanized as Ţāveh Espīd; also known as Tāveh Safīd and Tāveh Sefīd) is a village in Sarfaryab Rural District, Sarfaryab District, Charam County, Kohgiluyeh and Boyer-Ahmad Province, Iran. At the 2006 census, its population was 115, in 27 families.
