= Tuveh, Khuzestan =

Tuveh توه
- Village
- Location within Iran
- Coordinates: 32°48′38″N 48°43′19″E
- Country: Iran
- Province: Khuzestan
- County: Andimeshk
- Bakhsh: Alvar-e Garmsiri
- Rural District: Mazu

Population (2006)
  - Total: 26
- Time zone: UTC+3:30 (IRST)
  - Summer (DST): UTC+4:30 (IRDT)

Tuveh (Persian: توه, also Romanized as Tūveh; also known as Tāveh, Toveh, and Tūvah) is a village in Mazu Rural District, Alvar-e Garmsiri District, Andimeshk County, Khuzestan Province, Iran. At the 2006 census, its population was 26, in 10 families.
