= Golidagh Rural District =

Rural district in Golestan province, Iran

Golidagh Rural District Persian: دهستان گلي داغ
- Rural District
- Location within Iran
- Coordinates: 37°39′N 55°59′E
- Country: Iran
- Province: Golestan
- County: Maraveh Tappeh
- District: Golidagh
- Established: 1987
- Capital: Golidagh

Population (2016)
  - Total: 16,687
- Time zone: UTC+3:30 (IRST)

Golidagh Rural District (Persian: دهستان گلي داغ) is in Golidagh District of Maraveh Tappeh County, Golestan province, Iran. It is administered from the city of Golidagh.

== Demographics ==
=== Population ===
At the time of the 2006 National Census, the rural district's population (as a part of the former Maraveh Tappeh District in Kalaleh County) was 16,506 in 3,188 households. There were 15,643 inhabitants in 3,830 households at the following census of 2011, by which time the district had been separated from the county in the establishment of Maraveh Tappeh County. The rural district was transferred to the new Golidagh District. The 2016 census measured the population of the rural district as 16,687 in 4,520 households. The most populous of its 26 villages was Yan Bolagh, with 2,183 people.

=== Other villages in the rural district ===
- Arab Laleh Gun
- Baq Qajeh-ye Bala
- Baq Qajeh-ye Pain
- Biatlar
- Eslamabad-e Pain
- Kesan
- Luhandar
- Poli-ye Sofla
- Qulaq Kasan
- Qusheh Su
- Sharlaq
