= Mishan Rural District =

Rural district in Fars province, Iran

Mishan Rural District Persian: دهستان ميشان
- Rural District
- Location within Iran
- Coordinates: 29°55′12″N 51°00′14″E
- Country: Iran
- Province: Fars
- County: Mamasani
- District: Mahur Milani
- Capital: Mishan-e Olya

Population (2016)
  - Total: 1,667
- Time zone: UTC+3:30 (IRST)

Mishan Rural District (Persian: دهستان ميشان) is in Mahur Milani District of Mamasani County, Fars province, Iran. Its capital is the village of Mishan-e Olya.

== Demographics ==
=== Population ===
At the time of the 2006 National Census, the rural district's population was 4,301 in 990 households. There were 2,419 inhabitants in 655 households at the following census of 2011. The 2016 census measured the population of the rural district as 1,667 in 491 households. The most populous of its 83 villages was Mishan-e Olya, with 561 people.
