= Mahur Rural District =

Rural district in Fars province, Iran

Mahur Rural District Persian: دهستان ماهور
- Rural District
- Location within Iran
- Coordinates: 29°59′53″N 51°13′48″E
- Country: Iran
- Province: Fars
- County: Mamasani
- District: Mahur Milani
- Capital: Baba Monir

Population (2016)
  - Total: 2,251
- Time zone: UTC+3:30 (IRST)

Mahur Rural District (Persian: دهستان ماهور) is in Mahur Milani District of Mamasani County, Fars province, Iran. It is administered from the city of Baba Monir.

== Demographics ==
=== Population ===
At the time of the 2006 National Census, the rural district's population was 5,614 in 1,287 households. There were 4,892 inhabitants in 1,246 households at the following census of 2011. The 2016 census measured the population of the rural district as 2,251 in 663 households. The most populous of its 95 villages was Barm-e Siah, with 769 people.
