= Maraveh Tappeh Rural District =

Rural district in Golestan province, Iran

Maraveh Tappeh Rural District Persian: دهستان مراوه تپه
- Rural District
- Location within Iran
- Coordinates: 37°57′N 55°51′E
- Country: Iran
- Province: Golestan
- County: Maraveh Tappeh
- District: Central
- Established: 1987
- Capital: Suzesh

Population (2016)
  - Total: 13,302
- Time zone: UTC+3:30 (IRST)

Maraveh Tappeh Rural District (Persian: دهستان مراوه تپه) is in the Central District of Maraveh Tappeh County, Golestan province, Iran. Its capital is the village of Suzesh. The rural district was previously administered from the city of Maraveh Tappeh.

== Demographics ==
=== Population ===
At the time of the 2006 National Census, the rural district's population (as a part of the former Maraveh Tappeh District in Kalaleh County) was 23,766 in 4,604 households. There were 12,212 inhabitants in 2,686 households at the following census of 2011, by which time the district had been separated from the county in the establishment of Maraveh Tappeh County. The rural district was transferred to the new Central District. The 2016 census measured the population of the rural district as 13,302 in 3,575 households. The most populous of its 32 villages was Aq Taqeh-ye Jadid, with 1,702 people.

=== Other villages in the rural district ===
- Chayli
- Chenaran
- Khujeh Galdi
- Narli Aji Su
- Qarah Gol-e Gharbi
- Qarah Gol-e Kalleh
- Qarah Gol-e Sharqi
- Qarah Gol-e Takhteh-ye Vasat
- Qarqijeq
- Qorban Peykar
- Sari Qamish
