= Golidagh District =

District in Golestan province, Iran

Golidagh District Persian: بخش گلی‌داغ
- District
- Location within Iran
- Coordinates: 37°39′N 55°55′E
- Country: Iran
- Province: Golestan
- County: Maraveh Tappeh
- Established: 2007
- Capital: Golidagh

Population (2016)
  - Total: 28,728
- Time zone: UTC+3:30 (IRST)

Golidagh District (Persian: بخش گلی‌داغ) is in Maraveh Tappeh County, Golestan province, Iran. Its capital is the city of Golidagh.

== History ==
In 2007, Maraveh Tappeh District was separated from Kalaleh County in the establishment of Maraveh Tappeh County, which was divided into two districts of two rural districts each, with Maraveh Tappeh as its capital and only city at the time. The village of Golidagh was converted to a city in 2011.

== Demographics ==
=== Population ===
At the time of the 2011 census, the district's population was 27,419 in 6,598 households. The 2016 census measured the population of the district as 28,728 inhabitants in 7,806 households.

=== Administrative divisions ===
Golidagh District Population
Administrative Divisions	2011	2016
Golidagh RD	15,643	16,687
Shalami RD	11,776	12,041
Golidagh (city) (Note: Became a city after the 2016 census)		
Total	27,419	28,728
RD = Rural District
