= Mahur Milani District =

District in Fars province, Iran

Mahur Milani District Persian: بخش ماهور میلانی
- District
- Location within Iran
- Coordinates: 29°57′25″N 51°03′43″E
- Country: Iran
- Province: Fars
- County: Mamasani
- Capital: Baba Monir

Population (2016)
  - Total: 5,297
- Time zone: UTC+3:30 (IRST)

Mahur Milani District (Persian: بخش ماهور میلانی) is in Mamasani County, Fars province, Iran. Its capital is the city of Baba Monir.

== History ==
After the 2011 National Census, the village of Baba Monir was elevated to the status of a city.

== Demographics ==
=== Population ===
At the time of the 2006 census, the district's population was 9,915 in 2,277 households. The following census in 2011 counted 7,311 people in 1,901 households. The 2016 census measured the population of the district as 5,297 inhabitants in 1,542 households.

=== Administrative divisions ===
Mahur Milani District Population
Administrative Divisions	2006	2011	2016
Mahur RD	5,614	4,892	2,251
Mishan RD	4,301	2,419	1,667
Baba Monir (city)			1,379
Total	9,915	7,311	5,297
RD = Rural District
