= Central District (Maraveh Tappeh County) =

District in Golestan province, Iran

Central District (Maraveh Tappeh County) Persian: بخش مرکزی شهرستان مراوه تپه
- District
- Location within Iran
- Coordinates: 37°57′N 55°58′E
- Country: Iran
- Province: Golestan
- County: Maraveh Tappeh
- Established: 2007
- Capital: Maraveh Tappeh

Population (2016)
  - Total: 31,262
- Time zone: UTC+3:30 (IRST)

The Central District of Maraveh Tappeh County (Persian: بخش مرکزی شهرستان مراوه تپه) is in Golestan province, Iran. Its capital is the city of Maraveh Tappeh.

== History ==
In 2007, Maraveh Tappeh District was separated from Kalaleh County in the establishment of Maraveh Tappeh County, which was divided into two districts of two rural districts each, with Maraveh Tappeh as its capital and only city at the time.

== Demographics ==
=== Population ===
At the time of the 2011 census, the district's population was 28,402 in 6,243 households. The 2016 census measured the population of the district as 31,262 inhabitants in 8,141 households.

=== Administrative divisions ===
Central District (Maraveh Tappeh County) Population
Administrative Divisions	2011	2016
Maraveh Tappeh RD	12,212	13,302
Palizan RD	8,284	9,289
Maraveh Tappeh (city)	7,906	8,671
Total	28,402	31,262
RD = Rural District
