= Maraveh Tappeh District =

Former district in Golestan province, Iran

Maraveh Tappeh District Persian: بخش مراوه‌تپه
- Former District
- Location within Iran
- Coordinates: 37°49′N 55°57′E
- Country: Iran
- Province: Golestan
- County: Kalaleh
- Established: 2000
- Capital: Maraveh Tappeh

Population (2006)
  - Total: 45,874
- Time zone: UTC+3:30 (IRST)

Maraveh Tappeh District (Persian: بخش مراوه‌تپه) is a former administrative division of Kalaleh County, Golestan province, Iran. Its capital was the city of Maraveh Tappeh.

== History ==
In 2007, the district was separated from the county in the establishment of Maraveh Tappeh County.

== Demographics ==
=== Population ===
At the time of the 2006 National Census, the district's population was 45,874 in 8,939 households.

=== Administrative divisions ===
Maraveh Tappeh District Population
Administrative Divisions	2006
Golidagh RD	16,506
Maraveh Tappeh RD	23,766
Maraveh Tappeh (city)	5,602
Total	45,874
RD = Rural District
