= Maraveh Tappeh County =

County in Golestan province, Iran

Maraveh Tappeh County Persian: شهرستان مراوه تپه
- County
- Location of Maraveh Tappeh County in Golestan province (top, green)

- Location of Golestan province in Iran
- Coordinates: 37°49′N 55°57′E
- Country: Iran
- Province: Golestan
- Established: 2007
- Capital: Maraveh Tappeh
- Districts: Central, Golidagh

Population (2016)
  - Total: 60,953
- Time zone: UTC+3:30 (IRST)

Maraveh Tappeh County (Persian: شهرستان مراوه تپه) is in Golestan province, Iran. Its capital is the city of Maraveh Tappeh.

== History ==
In 2007, Maraveh Tappeh District was separated from Kalaleh County in the establishment of Maraveh Tappeh County, which was divided into two districts of two rural districts each, with Maraveh Tappeh as its capital and only city at the time. The village of Golidagh was converted to a city in 2011.

== Demographics ==
=== Population ===
At the time of the 2011 National Census, the county's population was 55,821 people in 12,815 households. The 2016 census measured the population of the county as 60,953 in 16,211 households.

=== Administrative divisions ===
Maraveh Tappeh County's population history and administrative structure over two consecutive censuses are shown in the following table.

Maraveh Tappeh County Population
Administrative Divisions	2011	2016
Central District	28,402	31,262
Maraveh Tappeh RD	12,212	13,302
Palizan RD	8,284	9,289
Maraveh Tappeh (city)	7,906	8,671
Golidagh District	27,419	28,728
Golidagh RD	15,643	16,687
Shalami RD	11,776	12,041
Golidagh (city) (Note: Became a city after the 2016 census)		
Total	55,821	60,953
RD = Rural District

== See also ==
Media related to Maraveh Tappeh County at Wikimedia Commons
