= Qarangi-ye Jangal =

Village in Golestan province, Iran

Qarangi-ye Jangal Persian: قرنگي جنگل
- Village
- Location within Iran
- Coordinates: 37°34′44″N 55°46′56″E
- Country: Iran
- Province: Golestan
- County: Kalaleh
- District: Pishkamar
- Rural District: Arab Dagh

Population (2016)
  - Total: 858
- Time zone: UTC+3:30 (IRST)

Qarangi-ye Jangal (Persian: قرنگي جنگل) (Note: Also romanized as Qarangī-ye Jangal; also known as Karak Jīnkal, Qarang Jangal, Qarānkī Jangal, Qarānkī-ye-Jangal, and Qarnag-e Jangal) is a village in Arab Dagh Rural District of Pishkamar District in Kalaleh County, Golestan province, Iran.

== Demographics ==
=== Population ===
At the time of the 2006 National Census, the village's population was 814 in 147 households, when it was in Zavkuh Rural District of the Central District. The following census in 2011 counted 857 people in 157 households, by which time the rural district had been separated from the district in the formation of Pishkamar District. Qarangi-ye Jangal was transferred to Arab Dagh Rural District created in the same district. The 2016 census measured the population of the village as 858 people in 232 households.
