= Savar, Iran =

Savar (Persian: سوار) may refer to:

- Savar, East Azerbaijan
- Savar-e Bala, Golestan Province
- Savar-e Pain, Golestan Province
- Savar-e Vasat, Golestan Province
- Savar, Lorestan
- Savar, South Khorasan
