= Yasaqleq =

Village in Golestan province, Iran

Yasaqleq Persian: ياساقلق
- Village
- Location within Iran
- Coordinates: 37°32′07″N 55°40′45″E
- Country: Iran
- Province: Golestan
- County: Kalaleh
- District: Pishkamar
- Rural District: Arab Dagh

Population (2016)
  - Total: 615
- Time zone: UTC+3:30 (IRST)

Yasaqleq (Persian: ياساقلق) (Note: Also romanized as Yāsāqleq) is a village in Arab Dagh Rural District of Pishkamar District in Kalaleh County, Golestan province, Iran.

== Demographics ==
=== Population ===
At the time of the 2006 National Census, the village's population was 600 in 128 households, when it was in Zavkuh Rural District of the Central District. The following census in 2011 counted 660 people in 158 households, by which time the rural district had been separated from the district in the formation of Pishkamar District. Yasaqleq was transferred to Arab Dagh Rural District created in the same district. The 2016 census measured the population of the village as 615 people in 161 households.
