= Arjanli =

Village in Golestan province, Iran

Arjanli Persian: ارجنلي
- Village
- Location within Iran
- Coordinates: 37°28′49″N 55°41′21″E
- Country: Iran
- Province: Golestan
- County: Kalaleh
- District: Pishkamar
- Rural District: Arab Dagh

Population (2016)
  - Total: 1,225
- Time zone: UTC+3:30 (IRST)

Arjanli (Persian: ارجنلي) (Note: Also romanized as Arjanlī) is a village in Arab Dagh Rural District of Pishkamar District in Kalaleh County, Golestan province, Iran.

== Demographics ==
=== Population ===
At the time of the 2006 National Census, the village's population was 902 in 201 households, when it was in Zavkuh Rural District of the Central District. The following census in 2011 counted 1,201 people in 262 households, by which time the rural district had been separated from the district in the formation of Pishkamar District. Arjanli was transferred to Arab Dagh Rural District created in the same district. The 2016 census measured the population of the village as 1,225 people in 318 households.
