= Tutli Tamak =

Village in Golestan province, Iran

Tutli Tamak Persian: توتلي تمك
- Village
- Location within Iran
- Coordinates: 37°28′56″N 55°43′39″E
- Country: Iran
- Province: Golestan
- County: Kalaleh
- District: Pishkamar
- Rural District: Arab Dagh

Population (2016)
  - Total: 172
- Time zone: UTC+3:30 (IRST)

Tutli Tamak (Persian: توتلي تمك) (Note: Also romanized as Tūtlī Tamaḵ) is a village in Arab Dagh Rural District of Pishkamar District in Kalaleh County, Golestan province, Iran.

== Demographics ==
=== Population ===
At the time of the 2006 National Census, the village's population was 251 in 59 households, when it was in Zavkuh Rural District of the Central District. The following census in 2011 counted 180 people in 52 households, by which time the rural district had been separated from the district in the formation of Pishkamar District. Tutli Tamak was transferred to Arab Dagh Rural District created in the same district. The 2016 census measured the population of the village as 172 people in 56 households.
