= Kurlar, Golestan =

Village in Golestan province, Iran

Kurlar Persian: كورلر
- Village
- Location within Iran
- Coordinates: 37°28′47″N 55°42′13″E
- Country: Iran
- Province: Golestan
- County: Kalaleh
- District: Pishkamar
- Rural District: Arab Dagh

Population (2016)
  - Total: 587
- Time zone: UTC+3:30 (IRST)

Kurlar (Persian: كورلر) (Note: Also romanized as Kūrlar) is a village in Arab Dagh Rural District of Pishkamar District in Kalaleh County, Golestan province, Iran.

== Demographics ==
=== Population ===
At the time of the 2006 National Census, the village's population was 500 in 125 households, when it was in Zavkuh Rural District of the Central District. The following census in 2011 counted 480 people in 124 households, by which time the rural district had been separated from the district in the formation of Pishkamar District. Kurlar was transferred to Arab Dagh Rural District created in the same district. The 2016 census measured the population of the village as 587 people in 175 households.
