= Azizabad, Golestan =

Village in Golestan province, Iran

Azizabad Persian: عزيزآباد
- Village
- Location within Iran
- Coordinates: 37°32′30″N 55°41′48″E
- Country: Iran
- Province: Golestan
- County: Kalaleh
- District: Pishkamar
- Rural District: Arab Dagh

Population (2016)
  - Total: 1,689
- Time zone: UTC+3:30 (IRST)

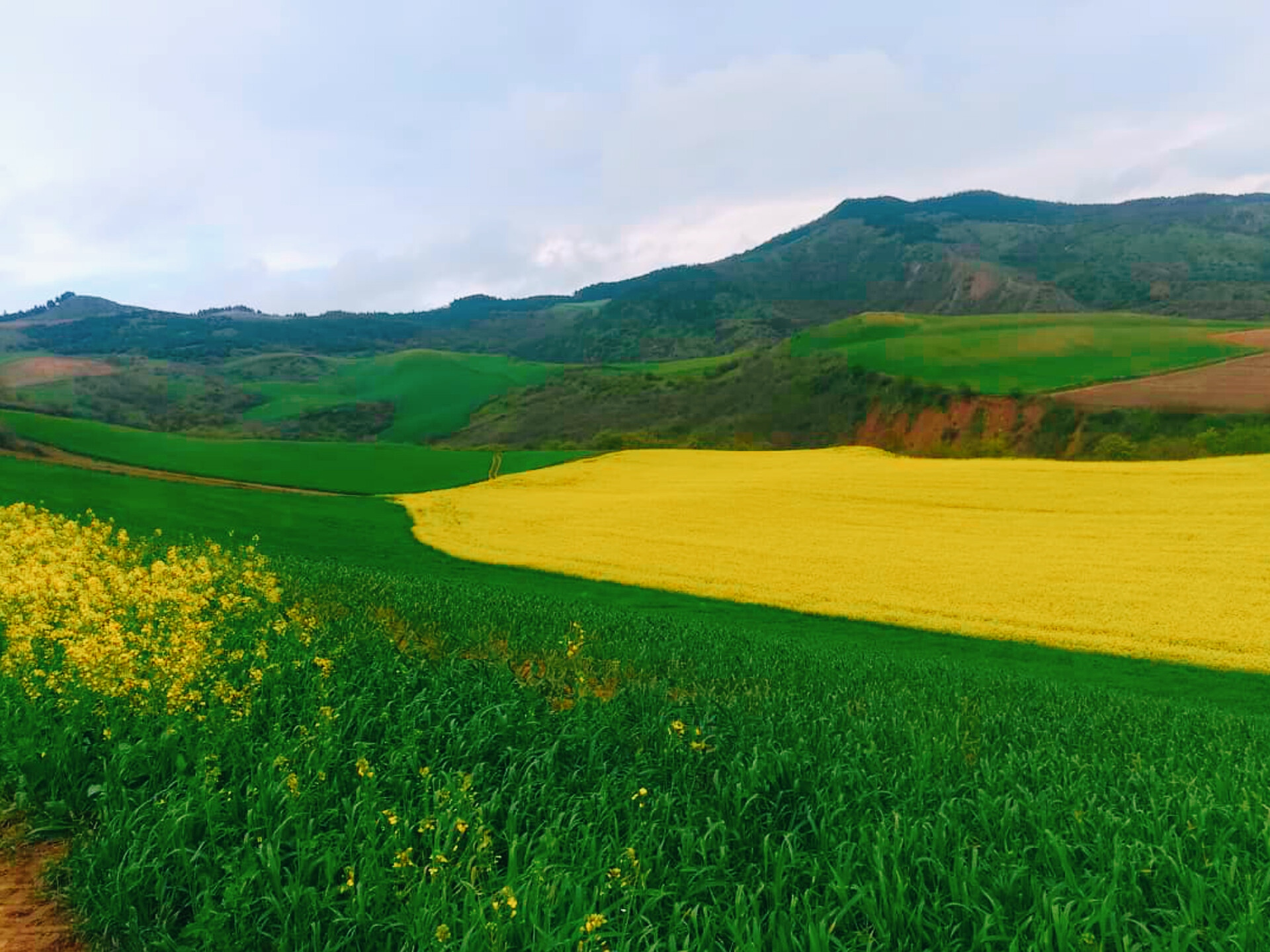
Nature of the Azizabad village

Azizabad (Persian: عزيزآباد) (Note: Also romanized as ‘Azīzābād) is a village in, and the capital of, Arab Dagh Rural District in Pishkamar District of Kalaleh County, Golestan province, Iran.

== Demographics ==
=== Population ===
At the time of the 2006 National Census, the village's population was 1,446 in 305 households, when it was in Zavkuh Rural District of the Central District. The following census in 2011 counted 1,752 people in 428 households, by which time the rural district had been separated from the district in the formation of Pishkamar District. Azizabad was transferred to Arab Dagh Rural District created in the same district. The 2016 census measured the population of the village as 1,689 people in 400 households. It was the most populous village in its rural district.
