= Chisht Khujehlar =

Village in Golestan province, Iran

Chisht Khujehlar Persian: چيشت خوجه لر
- Village
- Location within Iran
- Coordinates: 37°32′56″N 55°46′55″E
- Country: Iran
- Province: Golestan
- County: Kalaleh
- District: Pishkamar
- Rural District: Arab Dagh

Population (2016)
  - Total: 234
- Time zone: UTC+3:30 (IRST)

Chisht Khujehlar (Persian: چيشت خوجه لر) (Note: Also romanized as Chīsht Khūjehlar; also known as Chīsht Khūhehlar) is a village in Arab Dagh Rural District of Pishkamar District in Kalaleh County, Golestan province, Iran.

== Demographics ==
=== Population ===
At the time of the 2006 National Census, the village's population was 181 in 39 households, when it was in Zavkuh Rural District of the Central District. The following census in 2011 counted 210 people in 52 households, by which time the rural district had been separated from the district in the formation of Pishkamar District. Chisht Khujehlar was transferred to Arab Dagh Rural District created in the same district. The 2016 census measured the population of the village as 234 people in 63 households.
