= Khujeh Yapaqi =

Village in Golestan province, Iran

Khujeh Yapaqi Persian: خوجه ياپاقي
- Village
- Location within Iran
- Coordinates: 37°29′37″N 55°43′07″E
- Country: Iran
- Province: Golestan
- County: Kalaleh
- District: Pishkamar
- Rural District: Arab Dagh

Population (2016)
  - Total: 637
- Time zone: UTC+3:30 (IRST)

Khujeh Yapaqi (Persian: خوجه ياپاقي) (Note: Also romanized as Khūjeh Yāpāqī) is a village in Arab Dagh Rural District of Pishkamar District in Kalaleh County, Golestan province, Iran.

== Demographics ==
=== Population ===
At the time of the 2006 National Census, the village's population was 564 in 134 households, when it was in Zavkuh Rural District of the Central District. The following census in 2011 counted 607 people in 172 households, by which time the rural district had been separated from the district in the formation of Pishkamar District. Khujeh Yapaqi was transferred to Arab Dagh Rural District created in the same district. The 2016 census measured the population of the village as 637 people in 181 households.
