= Dumanli =

Village in Golestan province, Iran

Dumanli Persian: دومانلي
- Village
- Location within Iran
- Coordinates: 37°28′23″N 55°41′28″E
- Country: Iran
- Province: Golestan
- County: Kalaleh
- District: Pishkamar
- Rural District: Arab Dagh

Population (2016)
  - Total: 392
- Time zone: UTC+3:30 (IRST)

Dumanli (Persian: دومانلي) (Note: Also romanized as Dūmānlī) is a village in Arab Dagh Rural District of Pishkamar District in Kalaleh County, Golestan province, Iran.

== Demographics ==
=== Population ===
At the time of the 2006 National Census, the village's population was 337 in 70 households, when it was in Zavkuh Rural District of the Central District. The following census in 2011 counted 385 people in 91 households, by which time the rural district had been separated from the district in the formation of Pishkamar District. Dumanli was transferred to Arab Dagh Rural District created in the same district. The 2016 census measured the population of the village as 392 people in 109 households.
