= Gorganduz =

Village in Golestan province, Iran

Gorganduz Persian: گرگاندوز
- Village
- Location within Iran
- Coordinates: 37°30′51″N 55°43′51″E
- Country: Iran
- Province: Golestan
- County: Kalaleh
- District: Pishkamar
- Rural District: Arab Dagh

Population (2016)
  - Total: 213
- Time zone: UTC+3:30 (IRST)

Gorganduz (Persian: گرگاندوز) (Note: Also romanized as Gorgāndūz; also known as Gagāndūz) is a village in Arab Dagh Rural District of Pishkamar District in Kalaleh County, Golestan province, Iran.

== Demographics ==
=== Population ===
At the time of the 2006 National Census, the village's population was 225 in 51 households, when it was in Zavkuh Rural District of the Central District. The following census in 2011 counted 218 people in 63 households, by which time the rural district had been separated from the district in the formation of Pishkamar District. Gorganduz was transferred to Arab Dagh Rural District created in the same district. The 2016 census measured the population of the village as 213 people in 61 households.
