= Yel Cheshmeh-ye Olya =

Village in Golestan province, Iran

Yel Cheshmeh-ye Olya Persian: يل چشمه عليا
- Village
- Location within Iran
- Coordinates: 37°34′59″N 55°52′19″E
- Country: Iran
- Province: Golestan
- County: Kalaleh
- District: Pishkamar
- Rural District: Arab Dagh

Population (2016)
  - Total: 1,300
- Time zone: UTC+3:30 (IRST)

Yel Cheshmeh-ye Olya (Persian: يل چشمه عليا) (Note: Also romanized as Yel Cheshmeh-ye ‘Olyā; also known as Yel Cheshmeh-ye Bālā) is a village in Arab Dagh Rural District of Pishkamar District in Kalaleh County, Golestan province, Iran.

== Demographics ==
=== Population ===
At the time of the 2006 National Census, the village's population was 1,072 in 198 households, when it was in Zavkuh Rural District of the Central District. The following census in 2011 counted 1,270 people in 285 households, by which time the rural district had been separated from the district in the formation of Pishkamar District. Yel Cheshmeh-ye Olya was transferred to Arab Dagh Rural District created in the same district. The 2016 census measured the population of the village as 1,300 people in 310 households.
