= Yel Cheshmeh-ye Jadid =

Village in Golestan province, Iran

Yel Cheshmeh-ye Jadid Persian: يل چشمه جديد
- Village
- Location within Iran
- Coordinates: 37°34′11″N 55°49′18″E
- Country: Iran
- Province: Golestan
- County: Kalaleh
- District: Pishkamar
- Rural District: Arab Dagh

Population (2016)
  - Total: 365
- Time zone: UTC+3:30 (IRST)

Yel Cheshmeh-ye Jadid (Persian: يل چشمه جديد) (Note: Also romanized as Yel Cheshmeh-ye Jadīd and Yelcheshmeh-ye Jadīd) is a village in Arab Dagh Rural District of Pishkamar District in Kalaleh County, Golestan province, Iran.

== Demographics ==
=== Population ===
At the time of the 2006 National Census, the village's population was 412 in 56 households, when it was in Zavkuh Rural District of the Central District. The following census in 2011 counted 470 people in 105 households, by which time the rural district had been separated from the district in the formation of Pishkamar District. Yel Cheshmeh-ye Jadid was transferred to Arab Dagh Rural District created in the same district. The 2016 census measured the population of the village as 365 people in 95 households.
