= Qaduneh-ye Olya =

Village in Golestan province, Iran

Qaduneh-ye Olya Persian: قدونه عليا
- Village
- Location within Iran
- Coordinates: 37°33′47″N 55°45′18″E
- Country: Iran
- Province: Golestan
- County: Kalaleh
- District: Pishkamar
- Rural District: Arab Dagh

Population (2016)
  - Total: 900
- Time zone: UTC+3:30 (IRST)

Qaduneh-ye Olya (Persian: قدونه عليا) (Note: Also romanized as Qādūneh-ye ‘Olyā; also known as Qūdāneh-ye Bālā and Qūlāneh-ye Bālā) is a village in Arab Dagh Rural District of Pishkamar District in Kalaleh County, Golestan province, Iran.

== Demographics ==
=== Population ===
At the time of the 2006 National Census, the village's population was 751 in 142 households, when it was in Zavkuh Rural District of the Central District. The following census in 2011 counted 873 people in 196 households, by which time the rural district had been separated from the district in the formation of Pishkamar District. Qaduneh-ye Olya was transferred to Arab Dagh Rural District created in the same district. The 2016 census measured the population of the village as 900 people in 230 households.
