= Zav-e Bala =

Village in Golestan province, Iran

Zav-e Bala Persian: زاوبالا
- Village
- Location within Iran
- Coordinates: 37°31′05″N 55°45′31″E
- Country: Iran
- Province: Golestan
- County: Kalaleh
- District: Pishkamar
- Rural District: Arab Dagh

Population (2016)
  - Total: 542
- Time zone: UTC+3:30 (IRST)

Zav-e Bala (Persian: زاوبالا) (Note: Also romanized as Zāv-e Bālā; also known as Zāv) is a village in Arab Dagh Rural District of Pishkamar District in Kalaleh County, Golestan province, Iran.

== Demographics ==
=== Population ===
At the time of the 2006 National Census, the village's population was 443 in 98 households, when it was in Zavkuh Rural District of the Central District. The following census in 2011 counted 543 people in 140 households, by which time the rural district had been separated from the district in the formation of Pishkamar District. Zav-e Bala was transferred to Arab Dagh Rural District created in the same district. The 2016 census measured the population of the village as 542 people in 154 households.
