= Araz Ali Sheykh =

Village in Golestan province, Iran

Araz Ali Sheykh Persian: ارازعلی شيخ
- Village
- Location within Iran
- Coordinates: 37°32′50″N 55°34′08″E
- Country: Iran
- Province: Golestan
- County: Kalaleh
- District: Pishkamar
- Rural District: Zavkuh

Population (2016)
  - Total: 16
- Time zone: UTC+3:30 (IRST)

Araz Ali Sheykh (Persian: ارازعلی شيخ) (Note: Also romanized as Arāz ‘Alī Sheykh and Ārāz ‘Alī Sheykh; also known as Shaikh and Sheykh) is a village in Zavkuh Rural District of Pishkamar District in Kalaleh County, Golestan province, Iran.

== Demographics ==
=== Population ===
At the time of the 2006 National Census, the village's population was 357 in 61 households, when it was in the Central District. The following census in 2011 counted a population below the reporting threshold, by which time the rural district had been separated from the district in the formation of Pishkamar District. The 2016 census measured the population of the village as 16 people in nine households.
