= Kowli-ye Bayandor =

Village in Golestan province, Iran

Kowli-ye Bayandor Persian: كولی بايندر
- Village
- Location within Iran
- Coordinates: 37°31′02″N 55°33′26″E
- Country: Iran
- Province: Golestan
- County: Kalaleh
- District: Pishkamar
- Rural District: Zavkuh

Population (2016)
  - Total: 510
- Time zone: UTC+3:30 (IRST)

Kowli-ye Bayandor (Persian: كولی بايندر) (Note: Also romanized as Kowlī-ye Bāyandor) is a village in Zavkuh Rural District of Pishkamar District in Kalaleh County, Golestan province, Iran.

== Demographics ==
=== Population ===
At the time of the 2006 National Census, the village's population was 623 in 133 households, when it was in the Central District. The following census in 2011 counted 564 people in 139 households, by which time the rural district had been separated from the district in the formation of Pishkamar District. The 2016 census measured the population of the village as 510 people in 147 households.
