= Qaduneh-ye Sofla =

Village in Golestan province, Iran

Qaduneh-ye Sofla Persian: قدونه سفلي
- Village
- Location within Iran
- Coordinates: 37°33′20″N 55°44′45″E
- Country: Iran
- Province: Golestan
- County: Kalaleh
- District: Pishkamar
- Rural District: Arab Dagh

Population (2016)
  - Total: 778
- Time zone: UTC+3:30 (IRST)

Qaduneh-ye Sofla (Persian: قدونه سفلي) (Note: Also romanized as Qadūneh-ye Soflá; also known as Qūdāneh-ye Pā’īn) is a village in Arab Dagh Rural District of Pishkamar District in Kalaleh County, Golestan province, Iran.

== Demographics ==
=== Population ===
At the time of the 2006 National Census, the village's population was 717 in 125 households, when it was in Zavkuh Rural District of the Central District. The following census in 2011 counted 820 people in 195 households, by which time the rural district had been separated from the district in the formation of Pishkamar District. Qaduneh-ye Sofla was transferred to Arab Dagh Rural District created in the same district. The 2016 census measured the population of the village as 778 people in 184 households.
