= Savar-e Vasat =

Village in Golestan province, Iran

Savar-e Vasat Persian: سواروسط
- Village
- Location within Iran
- Coordinates: 37°26′35″N 55°42′04″E
- Country: Iran
- Province: Golestan
- County: Kalaleh
- District: Pishkamar
- Rural District: Arab Dagh

Population (2016)
  - Total: 180
- Time zone: UTC+3:30 (IRST)

Savar-e Vasat (Persian: سواروسط) (Note: Also romanized as Savār-e Vasaţ) is a village in Arab Dagh Rural District of Pishkamar District in Kalaleh County, Golestan province, Iran.

== Demographics ==
=== Population ===
At the time of the 2006 National Census, the village's population was 155 in 33 households, when it was in Zavkuh Rural District of the Central District. The following census in 2011 counted 163 people in 35 households, by which time the rural district had been separated from the district in the formation of Pishkamar District. Savar-e Vasat was transferred to Arab Dagh Rural District created in the same district. The 2016 census measured the population of the village as 180 people in 45 households.
