= Zav-e Pain =

Village in Golestan province, Iran

Zav-e Pain Persian: زاوپائين
- Village
- Location within Iran
- Coordinates: 37°30′26″N 55°44′42″E
- Country: Iran
- Province: Golestan
- County: Kalaleh
- District: Pishkamar
- Rural District: Arab Dagh

Population (2016)
  - Total: 458
- Time zone: UTC+3:30 (IRST)

Zav-e Pain (Persian: زاوپائين) (Note: Also romanized as Zāv-e Pā’īn) is a village in Arab Dagh Rural District of Pishkamar District in Kalaleh County, Golestan province, Iran.

== Demographics ==
=== Population ===
At the time of the 2006 National Census, the village's population was 381 in 89 households, when it was in Zavkuh Rural District of the Central District. The following census in 2011 counted 471 people in 123 households, by which time the rural district had been separated from the district in the formation of Pishkamar District. Zav-e Pain was transferred to Arab Dagh Rural District created in the same district. The 2016 census measured the population of the village as 458 people in 123 households.
