= Qareh Aghach =

Village in Golestan province, Iran

Qareh Aghach Persian: قره آغاچ
- Village
- Location within Iran
- Coordinates: 37°45′17″N 55°34′44″E
- Country: Iran
- Province: Golestan
- County: Kalaleh
- District: Pishkamar
- Rural District: Zavkuh

Population (2016)
  - Total: 1,445
- Time zone: UTC+3:30 (IRST)

Qareh Aghach (Persian: قره آغاچ) (Note: Also romanized as Qareh Āghāch; also known as Qareh Āghāj) is a village in Zavkuh Rural District of Pishkamar District in Kalaleh County, Golestan province, Iran.

== Demographics ==
=== Population ===
At the time of the 2006 National Census, the village's population was 1,426 in 282 households, when it was in Tamran Rural District of the Central District. The following census in 2011 counted 1,531 people in 380 households, by which time Zavkuh Rural District had been separated from the district in the formation of Pishkamar District. Qareh Aghach was transferred to the same rural district. The 2016 census measured the population of the village as 1,445 people in 396 households. It was the most populous village in its rural district.
