= Savar-e Pain =

Village in Golestan province, Iran

Savar-e Pain Persian: سوارپائين
- Village
- Location within Iran
- Coordinates: 37°27′44″N 55°41′40″E
- Country: Iran
- Province: Golestan
- County: Kalaleh
- District: Pishkamar
- Rural District: Arab Dagh

Population (2016)
  - Total: 605
- Time zone: UTC+3:30 (IRST)

Savar-e Pain (Persian: سوارپائين) (Note: Also romanized as Savār-e Pā’īn) is a village in Arab Dagh Rural District of Pishkamar District in Kalaleh County, Golestan province, Iran.

== Demographics ==
=== Population ===
At the time of the 2006 National Census, the village's population was 493 in 106 households, when it was in Zavkuh Rural District of the Central District. The following census in 2011 counted 571 people in 140 households, by which time the rural district had been separated from the district in the formation of Pishkamar District. Savar-e Pain was transferred to Arab Dagh Rural District created in the same district. The 2016 census measured the population of the village as 605 people in 168 households.
