= Yel Cheshmeh-ye Sofla =

Village in Golestan province, Iran

Yel Cheshmeh-ye Sofla Persian: يل چشمه سفلي
- Village
- Location within Iran
- Coordinates: 37°34′32″N 55°50′33″E
- Country: Iran
- Province: Golestan
- County: Kalaleh
- District: Pishkamar
- Rural District: Arab Dagh

Population (2016)
  - Total: 1,412
- Time zone: UTC+3:30 (IRST)

Yel Cheshmeh-ye Sofla (Persian: يل چشمه سفلي) (Note: Also romanized as Yel Cheshmeh-ye Soflá; also known as Yel Cheshmeh-ye Pā’īn) is a village in Arab Dagh Rural District of Pishkamar District in Kalaleh County, Golestan province, Iran.

== Demographics ==
=== Population ===
At the time of the 2006 National Census, the village's population was 1,205 in 227 households, when it was in Zavkuh Rural District of the Central District. The following census in 2011 counted 1,396 people in 290 households, by which time the rural district had been separated from the district in the formation of Pishkamar District. Yel Cheshmeh-ye Sofla was transferred to Arab Dagh Rural District created in the same district. The 2016 census measured the population of the village as 1,412 people in 389 households.
