= Gukjeh =

Village in Golestan province, Iran

Gukjeh Persian: گوكجه
- Village
- Location within Iran
- Coordinates: 37°30′35″N 55°32′16″E
- Country: Iran
- Province: Golestan
- County: Kalaleh
- District: Pishkamar
- Rural District: Zavkuh

Population (2016)
  - Total: 1,381
- Time zone: UTC+3:30 (IRST)

Gukjeh (Persian: گوكجه) (Note: Also romanized as Gūkjeh; also known as Būkcheh) is a village in, and the capital of, Zavkuh Rural District in Pishkamar District of Kalaleh County, Golestan province, Iran. The previous capital of the rural district was the village of Pishkamar, now the city of Faraghi.

== Demographics ==
=== Population ===
At the time of the 2006 National Census, the village's population was 1,390 in 288 households, when it was in the Central District. The following census in 2011 counted 1,332 people in 370 households, by which time the rural district had been separated from the district in the formation of Pishkamar District. The 2016 census measured the population of the village as 1,381 people in 409 households.
