= Hajji Beyk-e Olya =

Village in Golestan province, Iran

Hajji Beyk-e Olya Persian: حاجي بيك عليا
- Village
- Location within Iran
- Coordinates: 37°35′00″N 55°36′48″E
- Country: Iran
- Province: Golestan
- County: Kalaleh
- District: Pishkamar
- Rural District: Zavkuh

Population (2016)
  - Total: 790
- Time zone: UTC+3:30 (IRST)

Hajji Beyk-e Olya (Persian: حاجي بيك عليا) (Note: Also romanized as Ḩājjī Beyk-e ‘Olyā; also known as Ājī Beyk, Hājī Bāi, Ḩājjī Beyg-e ‘Olyā, and Ḩājjī Beyk-e Bālā) is a village in Zavkuh Rural District of Pishkamar District in Kalaleh County, Golestan province, Iran.

== Demographics ==
=== Population ===
At the time of the 2006 National Census, the village's population was 807 in 146 households, when it was in the Central District. The following census in 2011 counted 799 people in 193 households, by which time the rural district had been separated from the district in the formation of Pishkamar District. The 2016 census measured the population of the village as 790 people in 228 households.
