= Choruk-e Pishkamar =

Village in Golestan province, Iran

Choruk-e Pishkamar Persian: چروك پيشكمر
- Village
- Location within Iran
- Coordinates: 37°30′35″N 55°35′48″E
- Country: Iran
- Province: Golestan
- County: Kalaleh
- District: Pishkamar
- Rural District: Zavkuh

Population (2016)
  - Total: 278
- Time zone: UTC+3:30 (IRST)

Choruk-e Pishkamar (Persian: چروك پيشكمر) (Note: Also romanized as Chorūk-e Pīshḵamar; also known as Chorūk) is a village in Zavkuh Rural District of Pishkamar District in Kalaleh County, Golestan province, Iran.

== Demographics ==
=== Population ===
At the time of the 2006 National Census, the village's population was 286 in 70 households, when it was in the Central District. The following census in 2011 counted 283 people in 74 households, by which time the rural district had been separated from the district in the formation of Pishkamar District. The 2016 census measured the population of the village as 278 people in 88 households.
