= Kaser-e Pishkamar =

Village in Golestan province, Iran

Kaser-e Pishkamar Persian: كسرپيشكمر
- Village
- Location within Iran
- Coordinates: 37°31′13″N 55°37′16″E
- Country: Iran
- Province: Golestan
- County: Kalaleh
- District: Pishkamar
- Rural District: Zavkuh

Population (2016)
  - Total: 825
- Time zone: UTC+3:30 (IRST)

Kaser-e Pishkamar (Persian: كسرپيشكمر) (Note: Also romanized as Kaser-e Pīshkamar) is a village in Zavkuh Rural District of Pishkamar District in Kalaleh County, Golestan province, Iran.

== Demographics ==
=== Population ===
At the time of the 2006 National Census, the village's population was 708 in 166 households, when it was in the Central District. The following census in 2011 counted 756 people in 206 households, by which time the rural district had been separated from the district in the formation of Pishkamar District. The 2016 census measured the population of the village as 825 people in 249 households.
