= Hajji Beyk-e Sofla =

Village in Golestan province, Iran

Hajji Beyk-e Sofla Persian: حاجي بيك سفلي
- Village
- Location within Iran
- Coordinates: 37°34′49″N 55°36′09″E
- Country: Iran
- Province: Golestan
- County: Kalaleh
- District: Pishkamar
- Rural District: Zavkuh

Population (2016)
  - Total: 494
- Time zone: UTC+3:30 (IRST)

Hajji Beyk-e Sofla (Persian: حاجي بيك سفلي) (Note: Also romanized as Ḩājjī Beyk-e Soflá; also known as Ḩājjī Beyg-e Soflá and Ḩājjī Beyk-e Pā’īn) is a village in Zavkuh Rural District of Pishkamar District in Kalaleh County, Golestan province, Iran.

== Demographics ==
=== Population ===
At the time of the 2006 National Census, the village's population was 619 in 115 households, when it was in the Central District. The following census in 2011 counted 604 people in 174 households, by which time the rural district had been separated from the district in the formation of Pishkamar District. The 2016 census measured the population of the village as 494 people in 158 households.
