= Qarah Yasar-e Bala =

Village in Golestan province, Iran

Qarah Yasar-e Bala Persian: قره يسربالا
- Village
- Location within Iran
- Coordinates: 37°32′57″N 55°44′11″E
- Country: Iran
- Province: Golestan
- County: Kalaleh
- District: Pishkamar
- Rural District: Arab Dagh

Population (2016)
  - Total: 270
- Time zone: UTC+3:30 (IRST)

Qarah Yasar-e Bala (Persian: قره يسربالا) (Note: Also romanized as Qarah Yasar-e Bālā and Qareh Yasar-e Bālā) is a village in Arab Dagh Rural District of Pishkamar District in Kalaleh County, Golestan province, Iran.

== Demographics ==
=== Population ===
At the time of the 2006 National Census, the village's population was 188 in 40 households, when it was in Zavkuh Rural District of the Central District. The following census in 2011 counted 249 people in 53 households, by which time the rural district had been separated from the district in the formation of Pishkamar District. Qarah Yasar-e Bala was transferred to Arab Dagh Rural District created in the same district. The 2016 census measured the population of the village as 270 people in 75 households.
