= Ali Eslami-ye Yek =

Village in Golestan province, Iran

Ali Eslami-ye Yek Persian: علي اسلامي 1
- Village
- Location within Iran
- Coordinates: 37°20′29″N 55°28′51″E
- Country: Iran
- Province: Golestan
- County: Kalaleh
- District: Central
- Rural District: Kongur

Population (2016)
  - Total: 686
- Time zone: UTC+3:30 (IRST)

Ali Eslami-ye Yek (Persian: علي اسلامي 1) (Note: Also romanized as ‘Ālī Eslāmī-ye Yek; formerly known as Mazraeh-ye Ali Eslami-ye Shemareh 1 (مزرعه علي اسلامي شماره 1)) is a village in Kongur Rural District of the Central District in Kalaleh County, Golestan province, Iran.

== Demographics ==
=== Population ===
At the time of the 2006 National Census, the village's population, as Mazraeh-ye Ali Eslami-ye Shemareh 1, was 1,030 in 248 households. The following census in 2011 counted 721 people in 194 households, by which time the village was listed as Ali Eslami-ye Yek. The 2016 census measured the population of the village as 686 people in 217 households.
