= Koruk Chutur =

Village in Golestan province, Iran

Koruk Chutur Persian: كروك چوتور
- Village
- Location within Iran
- Coordinates: 37°31′41″N 55°40′05″E
- Country: Iran
- Province: Golestan
- County: Kalaleh
- District: Pishkamar
- Rural District: Arab Dagh

Population (2016)
  - Total: 314
- Time zone: UTC+3:30 (IRST)

Koruk Chutur (Persian: كروك چوتور) (Note: Also romanized as Korūk Chūtūr; also known as Chūtūr Korūk, Korūk, and Qūryūg) is a village in Arab Dagh Rural District of Pishkamar District in Kalaleh County, Golestan province, Iran.

== Demographics ==
=== Population ===
At the time of the 2006 National Census, the village's population was 335 in 67 households, when it was in Zavkuh Rural District of the Central District. The following census in 2011 counted 323 people in 71 households, by which time the rural district had been separated from the district in the formation of Pishkamar District. Koruk Chutur was transferred to Arab Dagh Rural District created in the same district. The 2016 census measured the population of the village as 323 people in 71 households.
