= Yel Cheshmeh =

Yel Cheshmeh or Yelcheshmeh (Persian: يل چشمه) may refer to:

- Yel Cheshmeh-ye Jadid
- Yel Cheshmeh-ye Olya
- Yel Cheshmeh-ye Sofla
