= Qarah Yasar-e Pain =

Village in Golestan province, Iran

Qarah Yasar-e Pain Persian: قره يسرپائين
- Village
- Location within Iran
- Coordinates: 37°32′28″N 55°43′24″E
- Country: Iran
- Province: Golestan
- County: Kalaleh
- District: Pishkamar
- Rural District: Arab Dagh

Population (2016)
  - Total: 489
- Time zone: UTC+3:30 (IRST)

Qarah Yasar-e Pain (Persian: قره يسرپائين) (Note: Also romanized as Qarah Yasar-e Pā’īn and Qareh Yasar-e Pā’īn) is a village in Arab Dagh Rural District of Pishkamar District in Kalaleh County, Golestan province, Iran.

== Demographics ==
=== Population ===
At the time of the 2006 National Census, the village's population was 393 in 81 households, when it was in Zavkuh Rural District of the Central District. The following census in 2011 counted 530 people in 149 households, by which time the rural district had been separated from the district in the formation of Pishkamar District. Qarah Yasar-e Pain was transferred to Arab Dagh Rural District created in the same district. The 2016 census measured the population of the village as 489 people in 140 households.
