= Savar-e Bala =

Village in Golestan province, Iran

Savar-e Bala Persian: سواربالا
- Village
- Location within Iran
- Coordinates: 37°26′51″N 55°43′09″E
- Country: Iran
- Province: Golestan
- County: Kalaleh
- District: Pishkamar
- Rural District: Arab Dagh

Population (2016)
  - Total: 355
- Time zone: UTC+3:30 (IRST)

Savar-e Bala (Persian: سواربالا) (Note: Also romanized as Savār-e Bālā; also known as Savār) is a village in Arab Dagh Rural District of Pishkamar District in Kalaleh County, Golestan province, Iran.

== Demographics ==
=== Population ===
At the time of the 2006 National Census, the village's population was 287 in 62 households, when it was in Zavkuh Rural District of the Central District. The following census in 2011 counted 331 people in 78 households, by which time the rural district had been separated from the district in the formation of Pishkamar District. Savar-e Bala was transferred to Arab Dagh Rural District created in the same district. The 2016 census measured the population of the village as 355 people in 98 households.
