= Aq Yaji =

Village in Golestan province, Iran

Aq Yaji Persian: آق ياجی
- Village
- Location within Iran
- Coordinates: 37°30′47″N 55°34′13″E
- Country: Iran
- Province: Golestan
- County: Kalaleh
- District: Pishkamar
- Rural District: Zavkuh

Population (2016)
  - Total: 438
- Time zone: UTC+3:30 (IRST)

Aq Yaji (Persian: آق ياجی) (Note: Also romanized as Āq Yājī) is a village in Zavkuh Rural District of Pishkamar District in Kalaleh County, Golestan province, Iran.

== Demographics ==
=== Population ===
At the time of the 2006 National Census, the village's population was 486 in 107 households, when it was in the Central District. The following census in 2011 counted 451 people in 123 households, by which time the rural district had been separated from the district in the formation of Pishkamar District. The 2016 census measured the population of the village as 438 people in 124 households.
