= Yekkeh Quz =

Yekkeh Quz (Persian: يكه قوز) may refer to:

- Yekkeh Quz-e Bala
- Yekkeh Quz-e Pain
