= Gav Mishli =

Gav Mishli گاوميشلی
- Village
- Location within Iran
- Coordinates: 37°21′24″N 55°20′26″E
- Country: Iran
- Province: Golestan
- County: Kalaleh
- Bakhsh: Central
- Rural District: Kongor

Population (2016)
  - Total: 182
- Time zone: UTC+3:30 (IRST)

Gav Mishli (Persian: گاوميشلی, also Romanized as Gāv Mīshlī and Gāv Meshlī; also known as Owbeh-ye Gāv Mīshlī) is a village in Kongor Rural District, in the Central District of Kalaleh County, Golestan Province, Iran.

At the time of the 2006 National Census, the village's population was 142 in 29 households. The following census in 2011 counted 149 people in 38 households. The 2016 census measured the population of the village as 182 people in 47 households.
