= Rusatai-ye Saraleh =

Sar Allah ثاراله
- Village
- Interactive map of Sar Allah
- Coordinates: 37.373°N 55.416°E
- Country: Iran
- Province: Golestan
- County: Kalaleh
- Bakhsh: Central
- Rural District: Kongor

Population (2016)
  - Total: 284
- Time zone: UTC+3:30 (IRST)

Sar Allah (Persian: ثاراله, also Romanized as Rūstā-ye Sārallāh) is a village in Kongor Rural District, in the Central District of Kalaleh County, Golestan Province, Iran.

At the time of the 2006 National Census, the village's population was 362 in 75 households. The following census in 2011 counted 340 people in 90 households. The 2016 census measured the population of the village as 284 people in 87 households.
