= Desni =

Desni may refer to:

- Desni, Iran, a village in Golestan Province, Iran
- Tamara Desni (1913-2008), British actress
- Xenia Desni (1894-1962), Ukrainian actress

== See also ==
- Desni Bajer Lake, in Croatia
