= Arab Dagh Rural District =

Rural district in Golestan province, Iran

Arab Dagh Rural District Persian: دهستان عرب داغ
- Rural District
- Location within Iran
- Coordinates: 37°31′N 55°50′E
- Country: Iran
- Province: Golestan
- County: Kalaleh
- District: Pishkamar
- Established: 2007
- Capital: Azizabad

Population (2016)
  - Total: 14,803
- Time zone: UTC+3:30 (IRST)

Arab Dagh Rural District (Persian: دهستان عرب داغ) is in Pishkamar District of Kalaleh County, Golestan province, Iran. Its capital is the village of Azizabad.

== History ==
In 2007, Zavkuh Rural District was separated from the Central District in the establishment of Pishkamar District, and Arab Dagh Rural District was created in the new district.

== Demographics ==
=== Population ===
At the time of the 2011 National Census, the rural district's population was 14,644 in 3,443 households. The 2016 census measured the population of the rural district as 14,803 in 3,907 households. The most populous of its 24 villages was Azizabad, with 1,689 people.

=== Other villages in the rural district ===
- Arjanli
- Chisht Khujehlar
- Dumanli
- Gorganduz
- Khujeh Yapaqi
- Koruk Chutur
- Kurlar
- Qaduneh-ye Olya
- Qaduneh-ye Sofla
- Qarah Yasar-e Bala
- Qarah Yasar-e Pain
- Qarangi-ye Jangal
- Savar-e Bala
- Savar-e Pain
- Savar-e Vasat
- Tutli Tamak
- Yasaqleq
- Yel Cheshmeh-ye Jadid
- Yel Cheshmeh-ye Olya
- Yel Cheshmeh-ye Sofla
- Zav-e Bala
- Zav-e Pain
