= Qerqiz =

Qerqiz قرقيز
- Village
- Location within Iran
- Coordinates: 37°23′31″N 55°25′15″E
- Country: Iran
- Province: Golestan
- County: Kalaleh
- Bakhsh: Central
- Rural District: Kongor

Population (2016)
  - Total: 380
- Time zone: UTC+3:30 (IRST)

Qerqiz (Persian: قرقيز, also Romanized as Qerqīz) is a village in Kongor Rural District, in the Central District of Kalaleh County, Golestan province, Iran.

At the time of the 2006 National Census, the village's population was 316 in 73 households. The following census in 2011 counted 368 people in 96 households. The 2016 census measured the population of the village as 380 people in 117 households.
