= Tamer-e Qarah Quzi =

Village in Golestan province, Iran

Tamer-e Qarah Quzi Persian: تمر قره قوزی
- Village
- Location within Iran
- Coordinates: 37°30′07″N 55°30′07″E
- Country: Iran
- Province: Golestan
- County: Kalaleh
- District: Central
- Rural District: Tamran

Population (2016)
  - Total: 4,535
- Time zone: UTC+3:30 (IRST)

Tamer-e Qarah Quzi (Persian: تمر قره قوزی) (Note: Also romanized as Tamer-e Qarah Qūzī; also known as Tamer) is a village in, and the capital of, Tamran Rural District in the Central District of Kalaleh County, Golestan province, Iran.

== Demographics ==
=== Population ===
At the time of the 2006 National Census, the village's population was 3,556 in 693 households. The following census in 2011 counted 4,141 people in 1,137 households. The 2016 census measured the population of the village as 4,535 people in 1,224 households. It was the most populous village in its rural district.
