= Gech Su =

Gech Su (Persian: گچ سو) may refer to:

- Gech Su-ye Bala
- Gech Su-ye Pain
