= Rusatai-ye Khan Baba Ahmadi =

Khan Baba Ahmadi خان بابااحمدی
- Village
- Interactive map of Khan Baba Ahmadi
- Coordinates: 37.381°N 55.409°E
- Country: Iran
- Province: Golestan
- County: Kalaleh
- Bakhsh: Central
- Rural District: Kongor

Population (2016)
  - Total: 60
- Time zone: UTC+3:30 (IRST)

Khan Baba Ahmadi (Persian: خان بابااحمدی, also Romanized as Rūsatāī-ye Khān Bābā Aḩmadī) is a village in Kongor Rural District, in the Central District of Kalaleh County, Golestan Province, Iran.

At the time of the 2006 National Census, the village's population was 69 in 14 households. The following census in 2011 counted 79 people in 17 households. The 2016 census measured the population of the village as 60 people in 13 households.
