= Rusatai-ye Belal =

Balal بلال
- Village
- Interactive map of Balal
- Coordinates: 37.369°N 55.442°E
- Country: Iran
- Province: Golestan
- County: Kalaleh
- Bakhsh: Central
- Rural District: Kongor

Population (2016)
  - Total: 173
- Time zone: UTC+3:30 (IRST)

Balal (Persian: بلال, also Romanized as Rūsatāī-ye Belāl) is a village in Kongor Rural District, in the Central District of Kalaleh County, Golestan Province, Iran.

At the time of the 2006 National Census, the village's population was 186 in 43 households. The following census in 2011 counted 189 people in 50 households. The 2016 census measured the population of the village as 173 people in 51 households.
