= Chaqar Shir Melli =

Village in Golestan province, Iran

Chaqar Shir Melli Persian: چقرشيرملی
- Village
- Location within Iran
- Coordinates: 37°20′30″N 55°31′29″E
- Country: Iran
- Province: Golestan
- County: Kalaleh
- District: Central
- Rural District: Kongur

Population (2016)
  - Total: 613
- Time zone: UTC+3:30 (IRST)

Chaqar Shir Melli (Persian: چقرشيرملی) (Note: Also romanized as Chaqar Shīr Melī and Chaqar Shīr Mellī) is a village in Kongur Rural District of the Central District in Kalaleh County, Golestan province, Iran.

== Demographics ==
=== Population ===
At the time of the 2006 National Census, the village's population was 742 in 171 households. The following census in 2011 counted 609 people in 156 households. The 2016 census measured the population of the village as 613 people in 175 households.
