= Khujehlar, Kalaleh =

Village in Golestan province, Iran

Khujehlar Persian: خوجه لر
- Village
- Location within Iran
- Coordinates: 37°23′11″N 55°22′48″E
- Country: Iran
- Province: Golestan
- County: Kalaleh
- District: Central
- Rural District: Kongur

Population (2016)
  - Total: 958
- Time zone: UTC+3:30 (IRST)

Khujehlar (Persian: خوجه لر) (Note: Also romanized as Khūjehlar and Khvājeh Lar; also known as Khājehlar and Khojeh Lar) is a village in Kongur Rural District of the Central District in Kalaleh County, Golestan province, Iran.

== Demographics ==
=== Population ===
At the time of the 2006 National Census, the village's population was 857 in 202 households. The following census in 2011 counted 979 people in 290 households. The 2016 census measured the population of the village as 958 people in 281 households.
