= Zaboli Mahalleh-ye Qarah Shur =

Village in Golestan province, Iran

Zaboli Mahalleh-ye Qarah Shur Persian: زابلی محله قره شور
- Village
- Location within Iran
- Coordinates: 37°20′34″N 55°21′55″E
- Country: Iran
- Province: Golestan
- County: Kalaleh
- District: Central
- Rural District: Kongur

Population (2016)
  - Total: 950
- Time zone: UTC+3:30 (IRST)

Zaboli Mahalleh-ye Qarah Shur (Persian: زابلی محله قره شور) (Note: Also romanized as Zaboli Mahallah Qarah Shur, Zābolī Maḥallah Qarah Shūr, and Zābolī Maḥalleh-ye Qarah Shūr; also known as Zabolimohleh) is a village in Kongur Rural District of the Central District in Kalaleh County, Golestan province, Iran.

== Demographics ==
=== Population ===
At the time of the 2006 National Census, the village's population was 1,027 in 224 households. The following census in 2011 counted 974 people in 274 households. The 2016 census measured the population of the village as 950 people in 302 households.
