= Yelli Badraq =

Village in Golestan province, Iran

Yelli Badraq Persian: یلی بدراق
- Village
- Location within Iran
- Coordinates: 37°32′11″N 55°27′39″E
- Country: Iran
- Province: Golestan
- County: Kalaleh
- District: Central
- Rural District: Tamran

Population (2016)
  - Total: 1,689
- Time zone: UTC+3:30 (IRST)

Yelli Badraq (Persian: یلی بدراق) (Note: Also romanized as Yellī Badraq) is a village in Tamran Rural District of the Central District in Kalaleh County, Golestan province, Iran.

== Demographics ==
=== Population ===
At the time of the 2006 National Census, the village's population was 1,442 in 270 households. The following census in 2011 counted 1,496 people in 375 households. The 2016 census measured the population of the village as 1,689 people in 440 households.
