= Kongur, Iran =

Village in Golestan province, Iran

Kongur Persian: كنگور
- Village
- Location within Iran
- Coordinates: 37°22′02″N 55°23′59″E
- Country: Iran
- Province: Golestan
- County: Kalaleh
- District: Central
- Rural District: Kongur

Population (2016)
  - Total: 1,657
- Time zone: UTC+3:30 (IRST)

Kongur (Persian: كنگور) (Note: Also romanized as Kangar and Kongor) is a village in, and the capital of, Kongur Rural District in the Central District of Kalaleh County, Golestan province, Iran.

== Demographics ==
=== Population ===
At the time of the 2006 National Census, the village's population was 1,464 in 339 households. The following census in 2011 counted 1,449 people in 396 households. The 2016 census measured the population of the village as 1,657 people in 489 households.
