= Zav (disambiguation) =

Zav may refer to:

- zav is a state of ritual impurity (abnormal seminal discharge) in Torah terminology.
- Zav-e Bala, a village in Iran
- Zav-e Pain, a village in Iran
- Zaav, a mythical Iranian king
