= Pashai, Iran =

Village in Golestan province, Iran

Pashai Persian: پاشائي
- Village
- Location within Iran
- Coordinates: 37°35′42″N 55°38′00″E
- Country: Iran
- Province: Golestan
- County: Kalaleh
- District: Pishkamar
- Rural District: Zavkuh

Population (2016)
  - Total: 86
- Time zone: UTC+3:30 (IRST)

Pashai (Persian: پاشائي) (Note: Also romanized as Pāshā’ī; also known as Pāshāhī and Pashey) is a village in Zavkuh Rural District of Pishkamar District in Kalaleh County, Golestan province, Iran.

== Demographics ==
=== Population ===
At the time of the 2006 National Census, the village's population was 233 in 41 households, when it was in the Central District. The following census in 2011 counted 73 people in 22 households, by which time the rural district had been separated from the district in the formation of Pishkamar District. The 2016 census measured the population of the village as 86 people in 26 households.
