= Qarah Yasar =

Qarah Yasar or Qareh Yasar (Persian: قره يسر) may refer to:

- Qarah Yasar-e Bala, a village in Zavkuh Rural District, Pishkamar District, Kalaleh County, Golestan Province, Iran
- Qarah Yasar-e Pain, a village in Zavkuh Rural District, Pishkamar District, Kalaleh County, Golestan Province, Iran
