= Chahar Mazu =

Village in Golestan province, Iran

Chahar Mazu Persian: چهارمازو
- Village
- Location within Iran
- Coordinates: 37°24′22″N 55°33′22″E
- Country: Iran
- Province: Golestan
- County: Kalaleh
- District: Central
- Rural District: Aq Su

Population (2016)
  - Total: 202
- Time zone: UTC+3:30 (IRST)

Chahar Mazu (Persian: چهارمازو) (Note: Also romanized as Chāhār Māzū; also known as Chahār Māẕī) is a village in Aq Su Rural District of the Central District in Kalaleh County, Golestan province, Iran.

== Demographics ==
=== Population ===
At the time of the 2006 National Census, the village's population was 192 in 49 households. The following census in 2011 counted 181 people in 53 households. The 2016 census measured the population of the village as 202 people in 60 households.
