= Rusatai-ye Ashura =

Ashura عاشورا
- Village
- Interactive map of Ashura
- Coordinates: 37.359°N 55.387°E
- Country: Iran
- Province: Golestan
- County: Kalaleh
- Bakhsh: Central
- Rural District: Kongor

Population (2016)
  - Total: 179
- Time zone: UTC+3:30 (IRST)

Ashura (Persian: عاشورا, also Romanized as Rūsatāī-ye ʿĀshūrā) is a village in Kongor Rural District, in the Central District of Kalaleh County, Golestan Province, Iran.

At the time of the 2006 National Census, the village's population was 150 in 29 households. The following census in 2011 counted 160 people in 35 households. The 2016 census measured the population of the village as 179 people in 48 households.
