= Qareh Said, Golestan =

Village in Golestan province, Iran

Qareh Said Persian: قره سعيد
- Village
- Location within Iran
- Coordinates: 37°33′21″N 55°34′39″E
- Country: Iran
- Province: Golestan
- County: Kalaleh
- District: Pishkamar
- Rural District: Zavkuh

Population (2016)
  - Total: 0
- Time zone: UTC+3:30 (IRST)

Qareh Said (Persian: قره سعيد) (Note: Also romanized as Qareh Sa‘īd; also known as Seyt) is a village in Zavkuh Rural District of Pishkamar District in Kalaleh County, Golestan province, Iran.

== Demographics ==
=== Population ===
At the time of the 2006 National Census, the village's population was 204 in 37 households, when it was in the Central District. The village did not appear in the following census of 2011, by which time the rural district had been separated from the district in the formation of Pishkamar District. The 2016 census measured the population of the village as zero.
