= Aman Khujeh =

Aman Khujeh امان خوجه
- Village
- Location within Iran
- Coordinates: 37°20′27″N 55°23′49″E
- Country: Iran
- Province: Golestan
- County: Kalaleh
- Bakhsh: Central
- Rural District: Kongor

Population (2016)
  - Total: 449
- Time zone: UTC+3:30 (IRST)

Aman Khujeh (Persian: امان خوجه, also Romanized as Amān Khūjeh and Amān Khvojeh; also known as Amān Khājeh) is a village in Kongor Rural District, in the Central District of Kalaleh County, Golestan Province, Iran.

At the time of the 2006 National Census, the village's population was 400 in 87 households. The following census in 2011 counted 421 people in 103 households. The 2016 census measured the population of the village as 449 people in 123 households.
