= Piruzabad, Golestan =

Piruzabad پيروز آباد
- Village
- Location within Iran
- Coordinates: 37°23′38″N 55°23′14″E
- Country: Iran
- Province: Golestan
- County: Kalaleh
- Bakhsh: Central
- Rural District: Kongor

Population (2016)
  - Total: 239
- Time zone: UTC+3:30 (IRST)

Piruzabad (Persian: پيروز آباد, also Romanized as Pīrūzābād) is a village in Kongor Rural District, in the Central District of Kalaleh County, Golestan Province, Iran.

At the time of the 2006 National Census, the village's population was 213 in 57 households. The following census in 2011 counted 254 people in 69 households. The 2016 census measured the population of the village as 239 people in 74 households.
