= Kuseh, Golestan =

Village in Golestan province, Iran

Kuseh Persian: كوسه
- Village
- Location within Iran
- Coordinates: 37°21′36″N 55°29′55″E
- Country: Iran
- Province: Golestan
- County: Kalaleh
- District: Central
- Rural District: Kongur

Population (2016)
  - Total: 2,773
- Time zone: UTC+3:30 (IRST)

Kuseh (Persian: كوسه) (Note: Also romanized as Kūseh) is a village in Kongur Rural District of the Central District in Kalaleh County, Golestan province, Iran.

== Demographics ==
=== Population ===
At the time of the 2006 National Census, the village's population was 1,770 in 420 households. The following census in 2011 counted 2,745 people in 638 households. The 2016 census measured the population of the village as 2,773 people in 772 households. It was the most populous village in its rural district.
