= Yarem Tappeh =

Village in Golestan province, Iran

Yarem Tappeh Persian: يارم تپه
- Village
- Location within Iran
- Coordinates: 37°27′12″N 55°23′31″E
- Country: Iran
- Province: Golestan
- County: Kalaleh
- District: Central
- Rural District: Tamran

Population (2016)
  - Total: 867
- Time zone: UTC+3:30 (IRST)

Yarem Tappeh (Persian: يارم تپه) (Note: Also romanized as Yārem Tappeh) is a village in Tamran Rural District of the Central District in Kalaleh County, Golestan province, Iran.

== Demographics ==
=== Population ===
At the time of the 2006 National Census, the village's population was 650 in 121 households. The following census in 2011 counted 774 people in 200 households. The 2016 census measured the population of the village as 867 people in 240 households.
