= Quy Joq =

Quy Joq or Quyjeq (Persian: قويجق) may refer to:

- Quy Joq, Golestan
- Quyjeq, West Azerbaijan
