= Hemmatabad-e Sistaniha =

Hemmatabad-e Sistaniha همت آباد سیستانیها
- Village
- Location within Iran
- Coordinates: 37°24′00″N 55°25′00″E
- Country: Iran
- Province: Golestan
- County: Kalaleh
- Bakhsh: Central
- Rural District: Kongor

Population (2016)
  - Total: 228
- Time zone: UTC+3:30 (IRST)

Hemmatabad-e Sistaniha (Persian: همت آباد سیستانیها, also Romanized as Hemmatābād-e Sīstānīhā; also known as Hemmatābād) is a village in Kongor Rural District, in the Central District of Kalaleh County, Golestan Province, Iran.

At the time of the 2006 National Census, the village's population was 220. The following census in 2011 counted 224 people in 63 households. The 2016 census measured the population of the village as 228 people in 67 households.
