= Boluk Ajan =

Village in Golestan province, Iran

Boluk Ajan Persian: بلوک اجن
- Village
- Location within Iran
- Coordinates: 37°24′38″N 55°32′55″E
- Country: Iran
- Province: Golestan
- County: Kalaleh
- District: Central
- Rural District: Aq Su

Population (2016)
  - Total: 545
- Time zone: UTC+3:30 (IRST)

Boluk Ajan (Persian: بلوک اجن) (Note: Also romanized as Bolūk Ājan and Bolūk Ajan) is a village in Aq Su Rural District of the Central District in Kalaleh County, Golestan province, Iran.

== Demographics ==
=== Population ===
At the time of the 2006 National Census, the village's population was 394 in 92 households. The following census in 2011 counted 484 people in 125 households. The 2016 census measured the population of the village as 545 people in 145 households.
