= Baynal =

Village in Golestan province, Iran

Baynal Persian: باينال
- Village
- Location within Iran
- Coordinates: 37°21′12″N 55°27′45″E
- Country: Iran
- Province: Golestan
- County: Kalaleh
- District: Central
- Rural District: Kongur

Population (2016)
  - Total: 1,325
- Time zone: UTC+3:30 (IRST)

Baynal (Persian: باينال) (Note: Also romanized as Bāynāl; also known as Bānīāl and Banīāl) is a village in Kongur Rural District of the Central District in Kalaleh County, Golestan province, Iran.

== Demographics ==
=== Population ===
At the time of the 2006 National Census, the village's population was 1,225 in 234 households. The following census in 2011 counted 1,303 people in 322 households. The 2016 census measured the population of the village as 1,325 people in 389 households.
