= Heydarabad-e Mohammad Shir =

Village in Golestan province, Iran

Heydarabad-e Mohammad Shir Persian: حيدر آباد محمدشير
- Village
- Location within Iran
- Coordinates: 37.331°N 55.443°E
- Country: Iran
- Province: Golestan
- County: Kalaleh
- District: Central
- Rural District: Kongur

Population (2016)
  - Total: 981
- Time zone: UTC+3:30 (IRST)

Heydarabad-e Mohammad Shir (Persian: حيدر آباد محمدشير) (Note: Also romanized as Ḩeydarābād-e Moḩammad Shīr; also known as Ḩeydarābād) is a village in Kongur Rural District of the Central District in Kalaleh County, Golestan province, Iran.

== Demographics ==
=== Population ===
At the time of the 2006 National Census, the village's population was 969 in 229 households. The following census in 2011 counted 1,038 people in 309 households. The 2016 census measured the population of the village as 981 people in 300 households.
