= Uqchi =

Uqchi (Persian: اوقچي) may refer to:

- Uqchi Bozorg
- Uqchi Kuchek
