= Sadd-e Chamran =

Village in Golestan province, Iran

Sadd-e Chamran Persian: سدچمران
- Village
- Location within Iran
- Coordinates: 37°24′29″N 55°26′06″E
- Country: Iran
- Province: Golestan
- County: Kalaleh
- District: Central
- Rural District: Kongur

Population (2016)
  - Total: 997
- Time zone: UTC+3:30 (IRST)

Sadd-e Chamran (Persian: سدچمران) (Note: Also romanized as Sadd-e Chamrān; also known as Sadd) is a village in Kongur Rural District of the Central District in Kalaleh County, Golestan province, Iran.

== Demographics ==
=== Population ===
At the time of the 2006 National Census, the village's population was 1,011 in 215 households. The following census in 2011 counted 950 people in 247 households. The 2016 census measured the population of the village as 997 people in 291 households.
