= Rusatai-ye Abuzer =

Coordinates: 37.3390°N 55.4098°E

Abuzer ابوذر
- Village
- Interactive map of Abuzer
- Country: Iran
- Province: Golestan
- County: Kalaleh
- Bakhsh: Central
- Rural District: Kongor

Population (2016)
  - Total: 438
- Time zone: UTC+3:30 (IRST)

Abuzer (Persian: روستاي ابوذر, also known as Rūsatāī-ye Ābūẕer) is a village in Kongor Rural District, in the Central District of Kalaleh County, Golestan Province, Iran.

At the time of the 2006 National Census, the village's population was 450 in 93 households. The following census in 2011 counted 419 people in 112 households. The 2016 census measured the population of the village as 438 people in 121 households.
