= Gink Lik-e Qarah Sahneh =

Gink Lik-e Qarah Sahneh گينک ليک قره صحنه
- Village
- Location within Iran
- Coordinates: 37°22′38″N 55°27′24″E
- Country: Iran
- Province: Golestan
- County: Kalaleh
- Bakhsh: Central
- Rural District: Tamran

Population (2016)
  - Total: 101
- Time zone: UTC+3:30 (IRST)

Gink Lik-e Qarah Sahneh (Persian: گينک ليک قره صحنه, also Romanized as Gīnk Līk-e Qarah Saḥneh; also known as Gīnk Līk and Gīnklīk-e Forūdgāh) is a village in Tamran Rural District, in the Central District of Kalaleh County, Golestan Province, Iran.

At the time of the 2006 National Census, the village's population was 93 in 16 households. The following census in 2011 counted 92 people in 24 households. The 2016 census measured the population of the village as 101 people in 27 households.
