= Qareh Tappeh-ye Sheykh =

Qareh Tappeh-ye Sheykh قره تپه شيخ
- Village
- Location within Iran
- Coordinates: 37°28′00″N 55°28′00″E
- Country: Iran
- Province: Golestan
- County: Kalaleh
- Bakhsh: Central
- Rural District: Tamran

Population (2016)
  - Total: 253
- Time zone: UTC+3:30 (IRST)

Qareh Tappeh-ye Sheykh (Persian: قره تپه شيخ) is a village in Tamran Rural District, in the Central District of Kalaleh County, Golestan Province, Iran.

At the time of the 2006 National Census, the village's population was 250 in 60 households. The following census in 2011 counted 233 people in 56 households. The 2016 census measured the population of the village as 253 people in 57 households.
