= Abdullah Ibn Umar Badheeb Al Yamani =

Yemeni Islamic scholar (1814 – 1892)

Saint Abdullah Ibn Umar Badheeb Al Yamani Sheikh
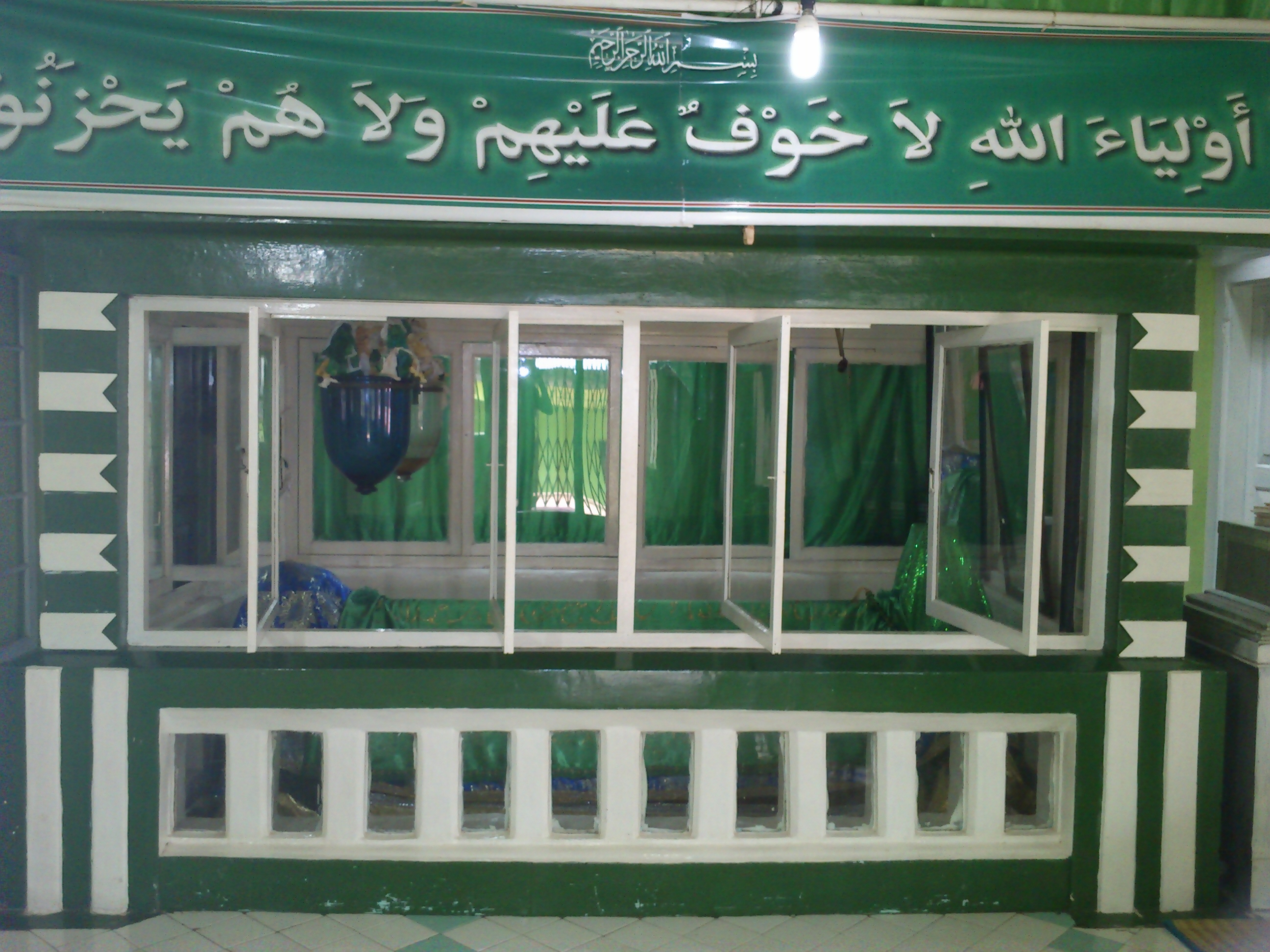

Personal life
- Born: 1814 Mocha, Yemen
- Died: 14 January 1892 (aged 77–78) Kahatowita, Sri Lanka
- Resting place: Kahatowita, Sri Lanka
- Other name: Sheikh Abdullah Ibn Umar Badheeb Al Yamani

Religious life
- Religion: Islam
- Denomination: Sunni (Sufism)

Sheikh Abdullah Ibn Umar Badheeb Al Yamani was an Islamic scholar and Sufi from Hadramout, Yemen. He arrived in Sri Lanka in 1858, and worked for Sri Lankan Muslims. He contributed significantly to Sri Lankan Muslim education along with M.C. Siddi Lebbe and Orabi Pasha. Badheeb also provided spiritual guidance and was the Sufi sheikh and founder of Qadiriyatul Badheebiyya Sufi order.

== Early life ==
Sheikh Abdullah Umar Badheeb Al Yamani was born in Mocha, Yemen. He attended primary education in his home town. He studied in Mecca. Badheeb studied Islamic sciences, Arabic, Sufism under Sheikh Usman Mirghani Makki in the Grand Mosque. He traveled to Egypt to study Fiqh, Tafseer, Arabic Grammar and literacy in Al-Azhar University under Sheikh ul Azhar Ibrahim al-Bajuri.

== Career ==
Badheeb completed his graduate study in Al-Azhar University and he traveled to India from Egypt along with Sheikh Assayed Ahmed Ibn Mubarak for dahwah or teaching Islam there. In India they travelled to Malabar to visit Sheikh Abdul Rahman. They stayed in Rahman's house and started their dahwah. After many days Badheeb travelled to North India while Sheikh Assayed Ahmed Ibn Mubarak travelled to Sri Lanka. During his Indian visit he described his experiences in books. At that time some people campaigned against Muhammad's parents' home states. Badheeb denied that allegation and wrote Zuhbathul Muslimeen Bi Abawai Seyyidil Mursaleen to respond to their allegations. Later he travelled to Sri Lanka.

Badheeb arrived in Sri Lanka in 1840. After a short stay, he returned to Yemen. He again traveled to Sri Lanka in 1858. At the time. Sri Lanka was a British colony. At that time Sri Lankan Muslims had low levels of education. Egyptian revolutionary leader Orabi Basha Also arrived Sri Lanka at the same time as Badheeb. Pasha and Sheikh Badheeb were assisted by M.C. Siddi Lebbe to carry out Sri Lankan Islamic education revival. Badheeb became Sufi Sheikh of M.C. Siddi Lebbe. Lebbe founded Colombo Zahira College with the help of Badheeb, Basha, Wappachhi Marikkar and others. Badheeb also helped Lebbe to open schools around Sri Lanka. In this period when Muslims scholars made efforts at spiritual revival, Badheeb helped develop the Qadiriyya Sufi order in Sri Lanka.

Sheikh Badheeb travelled around Sri Lanka, visiting Mawanella, Madulbowa, Hemmathagama, Kandy, and Gampola. He stayed in Hemmathagama for years, preaching and teaching. He established a takkiyathere. Badheeb founded a school in Madulbowa, Madulbowa Badheebiyya Maha Vidiyalaya. He later moved Kahatowita. He built a takkiya near Kahatowita Grand Mosque. Badheeb founded the Badheebiyyatul Qadiriyya Sufi Order. He formed Rathib Majlish and Zikr Majlish. He organized the annual feast commemoration. Badeebh established a school in Baheebiyya Takkiya. Today this school is known as Kahatowita Al-Badriya Maha Vidiyalaya.

== Death ==
Sheikh Badheeb lived in Kahatowita in his last years. He died on 14 January 1892 there. He was buried in Kahatowita Badeebiyya takkiya.

== Works ==
- Sailul Warid – Attacked the distorted ideas and wrongful practices that had crept into the Muslim society
- Risaltul Atkaar
- Riyaalul Ginaan
- Nassemun Najdi Bi raddi nunkiril Mahdi
- Soorul Mukarrabeen Bi raddil manjoobeen

== See also ==
- Sri Lankan Moors
