= Tuqqeh =

Village in Golestan province, Iran

Tuqqeh Persian: طوقه
- Village
- Location within Iran
- Coordinates: 37°20′46″N 55°29′38″E
- Country: Iran
- Province: Golestan
- County: Kalaleh
- District: Central
- Rural District: Kongur

Population (2016)
  - Total: 501
- Time zone: UTC+3:30 (IRST)

Tuqqeh (Persian: طوقه) (Note: Also romanized as Tūqqeh; also known as Toqqeh) is a village in Kongur Rural District of the Central District in Kalaleh County, Golestan province, Iran.

== Demographics ==
=== Population ===
At the time of the 2006 National Census, the village's population was 482 in 115 households. The following census in 2011 counted 467 people in 127 households. The 2016 census measured the population of the village as 501 people in 152 households.
