= Qarah Shur =

Village in Golestan province, Iran

Qarah Shur Persian: قره شور
- Village
- Location within Iran
- Coordinates: 37°20′26″N 55°22′21″E
- Country: Iran
- Province: Golestan
- County: Kalaleh
- District: Central
- Rural District: Kongur

Population (2016)
  - Total: 844
- Time zone: UTC+3:30 (IRST)

Qarah Shur (Persian: قره شور) (Note: Also romanized as Qarah Shūr and Qareh Shūr) is a village in Kongur Rural District of the Central District in Kalaleh County, Golestan province, Iran.

== Demographics ==
=== Population ===
At the time of the 2006 National Census, the village's population was 808 in 177 households. The following census in 2011 counted 802 people in 221 households. The 2016 census measured the population of the village as 844 people in 251 households.
