= Rusatai-ye Chamran =

Chamran چمران
- Village
- Interactive map of Chamran
- Coordinates: 37.344°N 55.450°E
- Country: Iran
- Province: Golestan
- County: Kalaleh
- Bakhsh: Central
- Rural District: Kongor

Population (2006)
  - Total: 147
- Time zone: UTC+3:30 (IRST)

Chamran (Persian: چمران, also known as Rūsatāī-ye Chamrān) is a village in Kongor Rural District, in the Central District of Kalaleh County, Golestan Province, Iran.

At the time of the 2006 National Census, the village's population was 160 in 37 households. The following census in 2011 counted 142 people in 39 households. The 2016 census measured the population of the village as 147 people in 49 households.
