= Kazem Khvajeh =

Village in Golestan province, Iran

Kazem Khvajeh Persian: كاظم خوجه
- Village
- Location within Iran
- Coordinates: 37°26′26″N 55°37′03″E
- Country: Iran
- Province: Golestan
- County: Kalaleh
- District: Central
- Rural District: Aq Su

Population (2016)
  - Total: 1,511
- Time zone: UTC+3:30 (IRST)

Kazem Khvajeh (Persian: كاظم خوجه) (Note: Also romanized as Kāz̧em Khvājeh) is a village in Aq Su Rural District of the Central District in Kalaleh County, Golestan province, Iran.

== Demographics ==
=== Population ===
At the time of the 2006 National Census, the village's population was 1,409 in 312 households. The following census in 2011 counted 1,539 people in 378 households. The 2016 census measured the population of the village as 1,511 people in 412 households.
