= Fathabad, Golestan =

Fathabad فتح آباد
- Village
- Location within Iran
- Coordinates: 37°21′52″N 55°26′44″E
- Country: Iran
- Province: Golestan
- County: Kalaleh
- Bakhsh: Central
- Rural District: Kongor

Population (2016)
  - Total: 303
- Time zone: UTC+3:30 (IRST)

Fathabad (Persian: فتح آباد, also Romanized as Fatḩābād) is a village in Kongor Rural District, in the Central District of Kalaleh County, Golestan Province, Iran.

At the time of the 2006 National Census, the village's population was 377 in 88 households. The following census in 2011 counted 286 people in 74 households. The 2016 census measured the population of the village as 303 people in 100 households.
