= Qareh Jeh =

Coordinates: 37.4734°N 55.5144°E

Qareh Jeh قره جه
- Village
- Interactive map of Qareh Jeh
- Country: Iran
- Province: Golestan
- County: Kalaleh
- Bakhsh: Central
- Rural District: Tamran

Population (2016)
  - Total: 288
- Time zone: UTC+3:30 (IRST)

Qareh Jeh (Persian: قره جه) is a village in Tamran Rural District, in the Central District of Kalaleh County, Golestan Province, Iran.

At the time of the 2006 National Census, the village's population was 251 in 51 households. The following census in 2011 counted 245 people in 63 households. The 2016 census measured the population of the village as 288 people in 85 households.
