= Ajan Sangarli =

Village in Golestan province, Iran

Ajan Sangarli Persian: اجن سنگرلی
- Village
- Location within Iran
- Coordinates: 37°25′13″N 55°33′44″E
- Country: Iran
- Province: Golestan
- County: Kalaleh
- District: Central
- Rural District: Aq Su

Population (2016)
  - Total: 1,715
- Time zone: UTC+3:30 (IRST)

Ajan Sangarli (Persian: اجن سنگرلی) (Note: Also romanized as Ājan Sangarlī and ‘Ajan Sangarlī) is a village in, and the capital of, Aq Su Rural District in the Central District of Kalaleh County, Golestan province, Iran.

== Demographics ==
=== Population ===
At the time of the 2006 National Census, the village's population was 1,391 in 340 households. The following census in 2011 counted 1,615 people in 433 households. The 2016 census measured the population of the village as 1,715 people in 464 households.
