= Rusatai-ye Anqolab =

Rusatai-ye Enqelab انقلاب
- Village
- Interactive map of Rusatai-ye Enqelab
- Coordinates: 37.380°N 55.432°E
- Country: Iran
- Province: Golestan
- County: Kalaleh
- Bakhsh: Central
- Rural District: Kongor

Population (2016)
  - Total: 114
- Time zone: UTC+3:30 (IRST)

Enqelab (Persian: انقلاب, also known as Rūsatāi-ye Ānqolāb) is a village in Kongor Rural District, in the Central District of Kalaleh County, Golestan Province, Iran.

At the time of the 2006 National Census, the village's population was 113 in 27 households. The following census in 2011 counted 113 people in 28 households. The 2016 census measured the population of the village as 114 people in 23 households.
