= Malay Sheykh-e Ginklik =

Village in Golestan province, Iran

Malay Sheykh-e Ginklik Persian: مالاي شيخ گینک لیک
- Village
- Location within Iran
- Coordinates: 37°27′11″N 55°25′52″E
- Country: Iran
- Province: Golestan
- County: Kalaleh
- District: Central
- Rural District: Tamran

Population (2016)
  - Total: 2,385
- Time zone: UTC+3:30 (IRST)

Malay Sheykh-e Ginklik (Persian: مالاي شيخ گینک لیک) (Note: Also romanized as Mālāy Sheykh-e Gīnklīk; also known as Gīnk Līk-e Mālāy Sheykh and Mollā Sheykh Gīngīlīk) is a village in Tamran Rural District of the Central District in Kalaleh County, Golestan province, Iran.

== Demographics ==
=== Population ===
At the time of the 2006 National Census, the village's population was 1,883 in 375 households. The following census in 2011 counted 2,287 people in 584 households. The 2016 census measured the population of the village as 2,385 people in 627 households.
