= Shahrak-e Jamhuri Eslami =

Town in Golestan province, Iran

Shahrak-e Jomhuri Eslami Persian: شهرک جمهوری اسلامی
- Town
- Location within Iran
- Coordinates: 37°23′31″N 55°27′32″E
- Country: Iran
- Province: Golestan
- County: Kalaleh
- District: Central
- Rural District: Kongur

Population (2016)
  - Total: 697
- Time zone: UTC+3:30 (IRST)

Shahrak-e Jomhuri Eslami (Persian: شهرک جمهوری اسلامی) (Note: Also romanized as Shahraḵ-e Jomhūrī Eslāmī) is a township in Kongur Rural District of the Central District in Kalaleh County, Golestan province, Iran. It is north of Kalaleh Airport.

== Demographics ==
=== Population ===
At the time of the 2006 National Census, the village's population was 659 in 149 households. The following census in 2011 counted 653 people in 182 households. The 2016 census measured the population of the village as 697 people in 202 households.
