= Garkaz =

Village in Golestan province, Iran

Garkaz Persian: گركز
- Village
- Location within Iran
- Coordinates: 37°22′26″N 55°21′37″E
- Country: Iran
- Province: Golestan
- County: Kalaleh
- District: Central
- Rural District: Kongur

Population (2016)
  - Total: 1,500
- Time zone: UTC+3:30 (IRST)

Garkaz (Persian: گركز) is a village in Kongur Rural District of the Central District in Kalaleh County, Golestan province, Iran.

== Demographics ==
=== Population ===
At the time of the 2006 National Census, the village's population was 1,136 in 274 households. The following census in 2011 counted 1,363 people in 375 households. The 2016 census measured the population of the village as 1,500 people in 427 households.
