= Qaduneh =

Qaduneh (Persian: قدونه) may refer to:

- Qaduneh-ye Olya
- Qaduneh-ye Sofla
