= Sufian, Golestan =

Village in Golestan province, Iran

Sufian Persian: صوفيان
- Village
- Location within Iran
- Coordinates: 37°28′19″N 55°30′06″E
- Country: Iran
- Province: Golestan
- County: Kalaleh
- District: Central
- Rural District: Tamran

Population (2016)
  - Total: 1,608
- Time zone: UTC+3:30 (IRST)

Sufian (Persian: صوفيان) (Note: Also romanized as Şūfīān and Şūfīyān) is a village in Tamran Rural District of the Central District in Kalaleh County, Golestan province, Iran.

== Demographics ==
=== Population ===
At the time of the 2006 National Census, the village's population was 1,468 in 267 households. The following census in 2011 counted 1,562 people in 405 households. The 2016 census measured the population of the village as 1,608 people in 475 households.
