= Sufi Sheykh Daz =

Village in Golestan province, Iran

Sufi Sheykh Daz Persian: صوفی شيخ داز
- Village
- Location within Iran
- Coordinates: 37°26′13″N 55°23′30″E
- Country: Iran
- Province: Golestan
- County: Kalaleh
- District: Central
- Rural District: Tamran

Population (2016)
  - Total: 1,351
- Time zone: UTC+3:30 (IRST)

Sufi Sheykh Daz (Persian: صوفی شيخ داز) (Note: Also romanized as Şūfī Sheykh Dāz; also known as Şūfī Sheykh Dār) is a village in Tamran Rural District of the Central District in Kalaleh County, Golestan province, Iran.

== Demographics ==
=== Population ===
At the time of the 2006 National Census, the village's population was 1,099 in 202 households. The following census in 2011 counted 1,304 people in 296 households. The 2016 census measured the population of the village as 1,351 people in 379 households.
