= Sufi Sheykh Gharavi =

Village in Golestan province, Iran

Sufi Sheykh Gharavi Persian: صوفی شيخ غراوی
- Village
- Location within Iran
- Coordinates: 37°26′07″N 55°24′30″E
- Country: Iran
- Province: Golestan
- County: Kalaleh
- District: Central
- Rural District: Tamran

Population (2016)
  - Total: 1,685
- Time zone: UTC+3:30 (IRST)

Sufi Sheykh Gharavi (Persian: صوفی شيخ غراوی) (Note: Also romanized as Şūfī Sheykh Gharāvī) is a village in Tamran Rural District of the Central District in Kalaleh County, Golestan province, Iran.

== Demographics ==
=== Population ===
At the time of the 2006 National Census, the village's population was 1,178 in 235 households. The following census in 2011 counted 1,459 people in 380 households. The 2016 census measured the population of the village as 1,685 people in 467 households.
