= Davaji =

Davaji دوجی
- Village
- Location within Iran
- Coordinates: 37°27′00″N 55°27′00″E
- Country: Iran
- Province: Golestan
- County: Kalaleh
- Bakhsh: Central
- Rural District: Tamran

Population (2016)
  - Total: 260
- Time zone: UTC+3:30 (IRST)

Davaji (Persian: دوجی, also Romanized as Davajī) means a person who owns camels and its spelled in different forms in almost all of Turkic languages. Davaji is a Turkmen tribe and a common family name between Turkmens of Turkmen Sahar, Iran. Davaji is also a village in Tamran Rural District, in the Central District of Kalaleh County, Golestan Province, Iran.

At the time of the 2006 National Census, the village's population was 335 in 55 households. The following census in 2011 counted 129 people in 32 households. The 2016 census measured the population of the village as 260 people in 72 households.
