= Dashti, Golestan =

Dashti دشتی
- Village
- Location within Iran
- Coordinates: 37°23′31″N 55°28′03″E
- Country: Iran
- Province: Golestan
- County: Kalaleh
- Bakhsh: Central
- Rural District: Kongor

Population (2016)
  - Total: 197
- Time zone: UTC+3:30 (IRST)

Dashti (Persian: دشتی, also Romanized as Dashtī) is a village in Kongor Rural District, in the Central District of Kalaleh County, Golestan Province, Iran.

At the time of the 2006 National Census, the village's population was 282 in 70 households. The following census in 2011 counted 178 people in 47 households. The 2016 census measured the population of the village as 197 people in 66 households.
