= Khambarabad, Kalaleh =

Khambarabad خمبر آباد
- Village
- Interactive map of Khambarabad
- Coordinates: 37.366°N 55.475°E
- Country: Iran
- Province: Golestan
- County: Kalaleh
- Bakhsh: Central
- Rural District: Kongor

Population (2016)
  - Total: 213
- Time zone: UTC+3:30 (IRST)

Khambarabad (Persian: خمبر آباد, also Romanized as Khambarābād) is a village in Kongor Rural District, in the Central District of Kalaleh County, Golestan Province, Iran.

At the time of the 2006 National Census, the village's population was 283 in 67 households. The following census in 2011 counted 211 people in 62 households. The 2016 census measured the population of the village as 213 people in 72 households.
