= Ajan Yeli =

Village in Golestan province, Iran

Ajan Yeli Persian: اجن یلی
- Village
- Location within Iran
- Coordinates: 37°23′57″N 55°31′12″E
- Country: Iran
- Province: Golestan
- County: Kalaleh
- District: Central
- Rural District: Aq Su

Population (2016)
  - Total: 1,119
- Time zone: UTC+3:30 (IRST)

Ajan Yeli (Persian: اجن یلی) (Note: Also romanized as Ājan Yelī; also known as Ajan Yili and Ājan Yīlī) is a village in Aq Su Rural District of the Central District in Kalaleh County, Golestan province, Iran.

== Demographics ==
=== Population ===
At the time of the 2006 National Census, the village's population was 738 in 163 households. The following census in 2011 counted 887 people in 228 households. The 2016 census measured the population of the village as 1,119 people in 297 households.
