= Salehabad-e Chaqorli =

Village in Golestan province, Iran

Salehabad-e Chaqorli Persian: صالح آباد چقرلی
- Village
- Location within Iran
- Coordinates: 37°25′33″N 55°35′15″E
- Country: Iran
- Province: Golestan
- County: Kalaleh
- District: Central
- Rural District: Aq Su

Population (2016)
  - Total: 1,881
- Time zone: UTC+3:30 (IRST)

Salehabad-e Chaqorli (Persian: صالح آباد چقرلی) (Note: Also romanized as Şaleḩābād-e Chaqorlī; also known as Qānjīq, Qanjīq, and Şaleḩābād) is a village in Aq Su Rural District of the Central District in Kalaleh County, Golestan province, Iran.

== Demographics ==
=== Population ===
At the time of the 2006 National Census, the village's population was 1,578 in 362 households. The following census in 2011 counted 1,866 people in 489 households. The 2016 census measured the population of the village as 1,881 people in 529 households.
