= Chalejeh =

Chalejeh چالجه
- Village
- Location within Iran
- Coordinates: 37°43′43″N 55°32′39″E
- Country: Iran
- Province: Golestan
- County: Kalaleh
- Bakhsh: Central
- Rural District: Tamran

Population (2016)
  - Total: 216
- Time zone: UTC+3:30 (IRST)

Chalejeh (Persian: چالجه, also Romanized as Chālejeh) is a village in Tamran Rural District, in the Central District of Kalaleh County, Golestan Province, Iran.

At the time of the 2006 National Census, the village's population was 372 in 75 households. The following census in 2011 counted 229 people in 49 households. The 2016 census measured the population of the village as 216 people in 61 households.
