= Mojaver =

Mojaver مجاور
- Village
- Location within Iran
- Coordinates: 37°23′37″N 55°21′28″E
- Country: Iran
- Province: Golestan
- County: Kalaleh
- Bakhsh: Central
- Rural District: Kongor

Population (2016)
  - Total: 250
- Time zone: UTC+3:30 (IRST)

Mojaver (Persian: مجاور, also Romanized as Mojāver; also known as Mījāver) is a village in Kongor Rural District, in the Central District of Kalaleh County, Golestan Province, Iran.

At the time of the 2006 National Census, the village's population was 207 in 49 households. The following census in 2011 counted 211 people in 53 households. The 2016 census measured the population of the village as 250 people in 77 households.
