= Hajji Hasan, Golestan =

Village in Golestan province, Iran

Hajji Hasan Persian: حاجی حسن
- Village
- Location within Iran
- Coordinates: 37°26′59″N 55°36′46″E
- Country: Iran
- Province: Golestan
- County: Kalaleh
- District: Central
- Rural District: Aq Su

Population (2016)
  - Total: 386
- Time zone: UTC+3:30 (IRST)

Hajji Hasan (Persian: حاجی حسن) (Note: Also romanized as Ḩājjī Ḩasan) is a village in Aq Su Rural District of the Central District in Kalaleh County, Golestan province, Iran.

== Demographics ==
=== Population ===
At the time of the 2006 National Census, the village's population was 314 in 66 households. The following census in 2011 counted 335 people in 80 households. The 2016 census measured the population of the village as 386 people in 111 households.
