= Tagak-e Emam Abdollah =

Village in Golestan Province, Iran

Tagak-e Emam Abdollah تگک امام عبداله
- Village
- Location within Iran
- Coordinates: 37°20′22″N 55°25′14″E
- Country: Iran
- Province: Golestan
- County: Kalaleh
- Bakhsh: Central
- Rural District: Kongor

Population (2016)
  - Total: 148
- Time zone: UTC+3:30 (IRST)

Tagak-e Emam Abdollah (Persian: تگک امام عبداله, also Romanized as Tagak-e Emām ʿAbdollah; also known as Tagak) is a village in Kongor Rural District, in the Central District of Kalaleh County, Golestan Province, Iran.

At the time of the 2006 National Census, the village's population was 132 in 28 households. The following census in 2011 counted 126 people in 35 households. The 2016 census measured the population of the village as 148 people in 44 households.
