= Yekkeh Quz-e Bala =

Village in Golestan province, Iran

Yekkeh Quz-e Bala Persian: يكه قوزبالا
- Village
- Location within Iran
- Coordinates: 37°28′27″N 55°37′23″E
- Country: Iran
- Province: Golestan
- County: Kalaleh
- District: Central
- Rural District: Aq Su

Population (2016)
  - Total: 2,068
- Time zone: UTC+3:30 (IRST)

Yekkeh Quz-e Bala (Persian: يكه قوزبالا) (Note: Also romanized as Yekkeh Qūz-e Bālā; also known as Yakigov and Yekkeh Qūz) is a village in Aq Su Rural District of the Central District in Kalaleh County, Golestan province, Iran.

== Demographics ==
=== Population ===
At the time of the 2006 National Census, the village's population was 1,808 in 379 households. The following census in 2011 counted 2,069 people in 505 households. The 2016 census measured the population of the village as 2,068 people in 534 households.
