= Tagak =

Tagak may refer to:

- Tagak Curley, Inuit leader, politician and businessman from Nunavut
- I.S.T. XL-15 Tagak, an aircraft
- Tagak, Iran
