= Qaravol =

Qaravol or Qarawal (Persian: قراول), also rendered as Qara Wul may refer to these places in Iran:

- Qaravol, Golestan
- Qaravol, Kurdistan

== See also ==
- Battle of Qarawal (1764), part of the Indian campaign of Ahmad Shah Durrani
