= Barbar Qaleh, Golestan =

Village in Golestan province, Iran

Barbar Qaleh Persian: بربرقلعه
- Village
- Location within Iran
- Coordinates: 37°23′40″N 55°27′42″E
- Country: Iran
- Province: Golestan
- County: Kalaleh
- District: Central
- Rural District: Kongur

Population (2016)
  - Total: 981
- Time zone: UTC+3:30 (IRST)

Barbar Qaleh (Persian: بربرقلعه) (Note: Also romanized as Barbar Qal‘eh; also known as Qal‘eh Barbar) is a village in Kongur Rural District of the Central District in Kalaleh County, Golestan province, Iran.

== Demographics ==
=== Population ===
At the time of the 2006 National Census, the village's population was 935 in 214 households. The following census in 2011 counted 978 people in 281 households. The 2016 census measured the population of the village as 981 people in 287 households.
