= Uqchi Kuchek =

Uqchi Kuchek اوقچی کوچک
- Village
- Location within Iran
- Coordinates: 37°42′00″N 55°23′00″E
- Country: Iran
- Province: Golestan
- County: Kalaleh
- Bakhsh: Central
- Rural District: Tamran

Population (2016)
  - Total: 362
- Time zone: UTC+3:30 (IRST)

Uqchi Kuchek (Persian: اوقچی کوچک, also Romanized as Ūqchī Kūchek) is a village in Tamran Rural District, in the Central District of Kalaleh County, Golestan Province, Iran.

At the time of the 2006 National Census, the village's population was 312 in 59 households. The following census in 2011 counted 347 people in 86 households. The 2016 census measured the population of the village as 362 people in 100 households.
