= Pashai =

Pashai or Pashayi may refer to:

- Pashayi people, of Afghanistan
  - Pashayi languages, the Indo-Aryan languages they speak
- Pashai, Iran, a village in Golestan Province, Iran
