= Yekkeh Quz-e Pain =

Village in Golestan province, Iran

Yekkeh Quz-e Pain Persian: يكه قوزپائين
- Village
- Location within Iran
- Coordinates: 37°27′42″N 55°37′21″E
- Country: Iran
- Province: Golestan
- County: Kalaleh
- District: Central
- Rural District: Aq Su

Population (2016)
  - Total: 754
- Time zone: UTC+3:30 (IRST)

Yekkeh Quz-e Pain (Persian: يكه قوزپائين) (Note: Also romanized as Yekkeh Qūz-e Pā’īn) is a village in Aq Su Rural District of the Central District in Kalaleh County, Golestan province, Iran.

== Demographics ==
=== Population ===
At the time of the 2006 National Census, the village's population was 654 in 148 households. The following census in 2011 counted 785 people in 200 households. The 2016 census measured the population of the village as 754 people in 205 households.
