= Qareh Said =

Qareh Said or Qarah Said (Persian: قره سعيد) may refer to:

- Qareh Said, Golestan
- Qareh Said, Zanjan
