= Gech Su-ye Bala =

Gech Su-ye Bala گچ سو بالا
- Village
- Location within Iran
- Coordinates: 37°43′23″N 55°26′17″E
- Country: Iran
- Province: Golestan
- County: Kalaleh
- Bakhsh: Central
- Rural District: Tamran

Population (2016)
  - Total: 476
- Time zone: UTC+3:30 (IRST)

Gech Su-ye Bala (Persian: گچ سو بالا, also Romanized as Gech Sū-ye Bālā; also known as Gechī Sū-ye Bālā and Gechī Sū) is a village in Tamran Rural District, in the Central District of Kalaleh County, Golestan Province, Iran.

At the time of the 2006 National Census, the village's population was 477 in 83 households. The following census in 2011 counted 538 people in 143 households. The 2016 census measured the population of the village as 476 people in 131 households.
