= Barbar Qaleh =

Barbar Qaleh (Persian: بربرقلعه) may refer to:

- Barbar Qaleh, Golestan
- Barbar Qaleh, North Khorasan
