= Quryug =

Quryug (Persian: قوريوگ) may refer to:

- Koruk Chutur
- Kuruk
