= Gunili =

Village in Golestan province, Iran

Gunili Persian: گونیلی
- Village
- Location within Iran
- Coordinates: 37°26′22″N 55°38′24″E
- Country: Iran
- Province: Golestan
- County: Kalaleh
- District: Central
- Rural District: Aq Su

Population (2016)
  - Total: 161
- Time zone: UTC+3:30 (IRST)

Gunili (Persian: گونیلی) (Note: Also romanized as Gūnīlī; also known as Goneylī and Guney) is a village in Aq Su Rural District of the Central District in Kalaleh County, Golestan province, Iran.

== Demographics ==
=== Population ===
At the time of the 2006 National Census, the village's population was 118 in 28 households. The following census in 2011 counted 150 people in 40 households. The 2016 census measured the population of the village as 161 people in 50 households.
