= Quy Joq, Golestan =

Quy Joq قويجق
- Village
- Location within Iran
- Coordinates: 37°45′00″N 55°31′04″E
- Country: Iran
- Province: Golestan
- County: Kalaleh
- Bakhsh: Central
- Rural District: Tamran

Population (2016)
  - Total: 354
- Time zone: UTC+3:30 (IRST)

Quy Joq (Persian: قويجق, also Romanized as Qūy Joq and Qūyjeq) is a village in Tamran Rural District, in the Central District of Kalaleh County, Golestan Province, Iran.

At the time of the 2006 National Census, the village's population was 211 in 45 households. The following census in 2011 counted 348 people in 85 households. The 2016 census measured the population of the village as 354 people in 98 households.
