= Faraghi =

City in Golestan province, Iran

Faraghi Persian: فراغی
- City
- Location within Iran
- Coordinates: 37°31′42″N 55°35′39″E
- Country: Iran
- Province: Golestan
- County: Kalaleh
- District: Pishkamar
- Established as a city: 2012

Population (2016)
  - Total: 5,777
- Time zone: UTC+3:30 (IRST)

Faraghi (Persian: فراغی) (Note: Formerly the village of Pishkamar (پيش كمر), also romanized as Pīsh Kamar and Pīshkamar; also known as Tekcha) is a city in, and the capital of, Pishkamar District in Kalaleh County, Golestan province, Iran. As the village of Pishkamar, it was the capital of Zavkuh Rural District until its capital was transferred to the village of Gökje.

== Demographics ==
=== Population ===
At the time of the 2006 National Census, the population was 2,632 in 614 households, when it was the village of Pishkamar in Zavkuh Rural District of the Central District. The following census in 2011 counted 5,104 people in 1,330 households, by which time the rural district had been separated from the district in the formation of Pishkamar District. The 2016 census measured the population as 5,777 people in 1,610 households, when Pishkamar had been converted to a city and renamed Faraghi.
