= Guney, Iran =

Guney (Persian: گوناي) in Iran may refer to:

- Guney, Golestan
- Guney, Zanjan
