= Gech Su-ye Pain =

Gech Su-ye Pain گچ سو پايين
- Village
- Location within Iran
- Coordinates: 37°43′00″N 55°26′00″E
- Country: Iran
- Province: Golestan
- County: Kalaleh
- Bakhsh: Central
- Rural District: Tamran

Population (2016)
  - Total: 259
- Time zone: UTC+3:30 (IRST)

Gech Su-ye Pain (Persian: گچ سو پايين, also Romanized as Gech Sū-ye Pā’īn; also known as Gechī Sū-ye Pā’īn and Gechī Sū-ye Soflá) is a village in Tamran Rural District, in the Central District of Kalaleh County, Golestan Province, Iran.

At the time of the 2006 National Census, the village's population was 228 in 61 households. The following census in 2011 counted 243 people in 68 households. The 2016 census measured the population of the village as 259 people in 74 households.
