= Qaravol-e Hajji Taji =

Village in Golestan province, Iran

Qaravol-e Hajji Taji Persian: قراول حاجی تاجی
- Village
- Location within Iran
- Coordinates: 37°20′43″N 55°30′44″E
- Country: Iran
- Province: Golestan
- County: Kalaleh
- District: Central
- Rural District: Kongur

Population (2016)
  - Total: 966
- Time zone: UTC+3:30 (IRST)

Qaravol-e Hajji Taji (Persian: قراول حاجی تاجی) (Note: Also romanized as Qarāvol-e Ḩājjī Tājī; also known as Qarāvol) is a village in Kongur Rural District of the Central District in Kalaleh County, Golestan province, Iran.

== Demographics ==
=== Population ===
At the time of the 2006 National Census, the village's population was 915 in 218 households. The following census in 2011 counted 916 people in 236 households. The 2016 census measured the population of the village as 966 people in 263 households.
