= Sufi Sheykh =

Sufi Sheykh صوفی شيخ
- Village
- Location within Iran
- Coordinates: 37°25′24″N 55°23′34″E
- Country: Iran
- Province: Golestan
- County: Kalaleh
- Bakhsh: Central
- Rural District: Tamran

Population (2016)
  - Total: 197
- Time zone: UTC+3:30 (IRST)

Sufi Sheykh (Persian: صوفی شيخ, also Romanized as Şūfī Sheykh; also known as Sāzemān-e Sarlashgar Anşārī and Şūfī Sheykh-e ‘Aţālar) is a village in Tamran Rural District, in the Central District of Kalaleh County, Golestan Province, Iran.

At the time of the 2006 National Census, the village's population was 152 in 28 households. The following census in 2011 counted 169 people in 48 households. The 2016 census measured the population of the village as 197 people in 55 households.
