= Sumbar =

Sumbar may refer to:

- Sumbar River, a river in southern Turkmenistan
- Šumbar Lake, a series of lakes in Karlovac County, Croatia
- West Sumatra, known in Indonesian as Sumatera Barat and abbreviated to Sumbar
