= Dahaneh-ye Porsu Qui =

Village in Golestan province, Iran

Dahaneh-ye Porsu Qui Persian: دهنه پرسوقويی
- Village
- Location within Iran
- Coordinates: 37°26′21″N 55°29′24″E
- Country: Iran
- Province: Golestan
- County: Kalaleh
- District: Central
- Rural District: Aq Su

Population (2016)
  - Total: 2,824
- Time zone: UTC+3:30 (IRST)

Dahaneh-ye Porsu Qui (Persian: دهنه پرسوقويی) (Note: Also romanized as Dahaneh-ye Porsū Qū’ī; also known as Dahaneh, Dahneh, and Desni) is a village in Aq Su Rural District of the Central District in Kalaleh County, Golestan province, Iran.

== Demographics ==
=== Population ===
At the time of the 2006 National Census, the village's population was 2,315 in 486 households. The following census in 2011 counted 2,733 people in 769 households. The 2016 census measured the population of the village as 2,824 people in 817 households. It was the most populous village in its rural district.
