= Uqchi Bozorg =

Village in Golestan province, Iran

Uqchi Bozorg Persian: اوقچی بزرگ
- Village
- Location within Iran
- Coordinates: 37°41′57″N 55°22′04″E
- Country: Iran
- Province: Golestan
- County: Kalaleh
- District: Central
- Rural District: Tamran

Population (2016)
  - Total: 884
- Time zone: UTC+3:30 (IRST)

Uqchi Bozorg (Persian: اوقچی بزرگ) (Note: Also romanized as Ūqchī Bozorg) is a village in Tamran Rural District of the Central District in Kalaleh County, Golestan province, Iran.

== Demographics ==
=== Population ===
At the time of the 2006 National Census, the village's population was 725 in 124 households. The following census in 2011 counted 804 people in 179 households. The 2016 census measured the population of the village as 884 people in 224 households.
