= Aq Su Rural District =

Rural district in Golestan province, Iran

Aq Su Rural District Persian: دهستان آق سو
- Rural District
- Location within Iran
- Coordinates: 37°26′N 55°34′E
- Country: Iran
- Province: Golestan
- County: Kalaleh
- District: Central
- Established: 1987
- Capital: Ajan Sangarli

Population (2016)
  - Total: 13,166
- Time zone: UTC+3:30 (IRST)

Aq Su Rural District (Persian: دهستان آق سو) is in the Central District of Kalaleh County, Golestan province, Iran. Its capital is the village of Ajan Sangarli.

== Demographics ==
=== Population ===
At the time of the 2006 National Census, the rural district's population was 14,972 in 3,237 households. There were 17,342 inhabitants in 4,490 households at the following census of 2011. The 2016 census measured the population of the rural district as 13,166 in 3,624 households. The most populous of its 11 villages was Dahaneh-ye Porsu Qui, with 2,824 people.

=== Other villages in the rural district ===
- Ajan Yeli
- Boluk Ajan
- Chahar Mazu
- Gunili
- Hajji Hasan
- Kazem Khvajeh
- Salehabad-e Chaqorli
- Yekkeh Quz-e Bala
- Yekkeh Quz-e Pain
