= Tamran Rural District =

Rural district in Golestan province, Iran

Tamran Rural District Persian: دهستان تمران
- Rural District
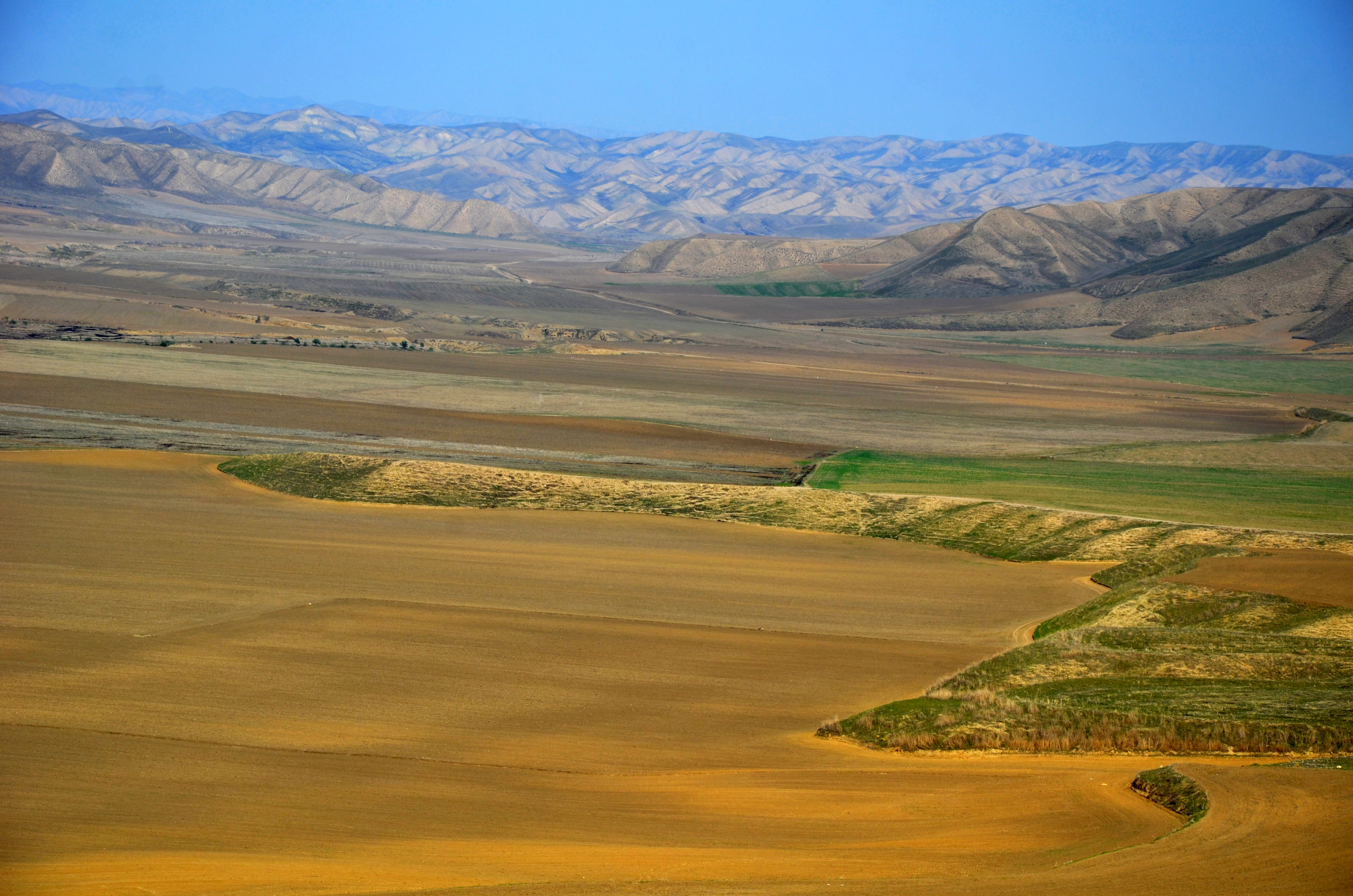
- Landscape along the Khaled Nabi Road

- Location within Iran
- Coordinates: 37°36′N 55°25′E
- Country: Iran
- Province: Golestan
- County: Kalaleh
- District: Central
- Established: 1987
- Capital: Tamer-e Qarah Quzi

Population (2016)
  - Total: 17,832
- Time zone: UTC+3:30 (IRST)

Tamran Rural District (Persian: دهستان تمران) is in the Central District of Kalaleh County, Golestan province, Iran. Its capital is the village of Tamer-e Qarah Quzi.

== Demographics ==
=== Population ===
At the time of the 2006 National Census, the rural district's population was 16,625 in 3,183 households. There were 16,400 inhabitants in 4,215 households at the following census of 2011. The 2016 census measured the population of the rural district as 17,832 in 4,853 households. The most populous of its 20 villages was Tamer-e Qarah Quzi, with 4,535 people.

=== Other villages in the rural district ===
- Chalejeh
- Davaji
- Gech Su-ye Bala
- Gech Su-ye Pain
- Gink Lik-e Qarah Sahneh
- Malay-e Sheykh-e Atalar
- Malay Sheykh-e Ginklik
- Qareh Aghach
- Qareh Jeh
- Qareh Tappeh-ye Sheykh
- Qareh Tarnav
- Qernaq
- Quy Joq
- Sufi Sheykh
- Sufi Sheykh Daz
- Sufi Sheykh Gharavi
- Sufian
- Uqchi Bozorg
- Uqchi Kuchek
- Yarem Tappeh
- Yelli Badraq
