= Kahatowita =

- Sinhala: කහටෝවිට
- Tamil: கஹடோவிட
- Location within Sri Lanka
- Coordinates: 7°05′42″N 80°06′35″E
- Country: Sri Lanka
- District: Gampaha District
- Time zone: UTC+5:30 (Sri Lanka Standard Time Zone)
  - Summer (DST): not observed
- Postal code: 11144
- Area codes: 033
- Website: www.kahatowita.com

Kahatowita (Sinhala: කහටෝවිට, Tamil: கஹடோவிட) is a village in Attanagalla electorate, Gampaha District, Western Province, Sri Lanka.

== Geography and climate ==
Kahatowita lies at an elevation of 37 meters (121 ft) above sea level. The north and north-eastern borders of Kahatowita are formed by the Attanagalla Oya river. Kahatowita has a tropical rainforest climate under the Köppen climate classification. Kahatowita's climate is normally temperate throughout the year, with an average temperature of 28 degrees Celsius (82.4 degrees Fahrenheit).

== Local government administration ==
Kahatowita is a historical village administered by Attanagalla Divisional Secretariat, which is one of thirteen electorate divisions administered under Gampaha District. It is divided into two divisions led by two different "Grama Niladari" (village officers) to make administration easier: Kahatowita and Kahatowita South.

== Religion ==
The first mosque in the village was built near Attanagalla Oya (Ovitta) in 1688. Later, the mosque had to be moved to another area as it was affected by frequent floods. Today, this mosque is called Kahatowita Grand Masjidh (Muhiyiddeen Jumma Mosque). The mosque is used for daily prayers and other religious and social activities. The second mosque, Masjidun Noor was built in 1975. In 1997, Jamiuth Tawheed Masjid was built as the third Jumma Masjidh. Whilst previously, the majority of villagers followed Sufi Tariqas such as Qadiriyya and Shadhili, most people now follow the Quran and Sunnah.

Assayed Ahmed Mubarak, a scholar from Hadramaut, Yemen who introduced the Qadiriyya Tariqa, visited Kahatowita in 1857. Abdullah Ibn Umar Badheeb Al Yamani, a scholar from Hadramaut, Yemen visited the village in 1859 to preach Islam and to educate people. Later, Qadiriyya Tariqa was introduced by the people following his visit. He established a takkiya, near to the Muhiyiddeen Jumma mosque and started Zikr Majlise and Islamic classes to attract the people towards Masjidhs. He founded Kahatowita Al-Badriya Maha Vidyalaya, the first school in Kahatowita in 1891. He was also a founder of Zahira College, Colombo.

The people who followed Shadhili Tariqa were brought to the village by Ibrahimul Makki in 1928. He opened a Shadhili in Kahatowita.

== Education ==
There are two government school in Kahatowita: Al-Badriya Maha Vidyala and Kahatowita Muslim Balika Vidyala. Al-Badriya Maha Vidyala was founded in 1891 by As sheikh Abdullah Ibn Umar Badeeb al Yamani. It became a government school in 1920. Al-Badriya Maha Vidyalaya provides education up to GCE Advanced Level.

Kahatowita Muslim Balika Vidyalaya was established in 1946, and provides education for Muslim girls up to GCE Ordinary Level. Badeebiyya Arabic school is another non-governmental (Arabic) College in Kahatowita, which provides Islamic religious education. Muaskarurrahman Ladies Arabic college provides Islamic religious education to Muslim women. Mustafawiyyah Ahadiya school (Daham Pasala) was established in 2006 and provides basic Islamic education for students. Kahatowita has a literacy rate of 98%.

== See also ==
- Gampaha District
- Western Province, Sri Lanka
- Attanagalla Divisional Secretariat
