= Savar, East Azerbaijan =

Savar صور
- Village
- Location within Iran
- Coordinates: 37°31′27″N 46°09′51″E
- Country: Iran
- Province: East Azerbaijan
- County: Bonab
- Bakhsh: Central
- Rural District: Benajuy-ye Shomali

Population (2006)
  - Total: 350
- Time zone: UTC+3:30 (IRST)
  - Summer (DST): UTC+4:30 (IRDT)

Savar (Persian: صور, also Romanized as Şavar) is a village in Benajuy-ye Shomali Rural District, in the Central District of Bonab County, East Azerbaijan Province, Iran. At the 2006 census, its population was 350, in 52 families.
