= Hemmathagama =

Hemmathagama හෙම්මාතගම
- Village
- Location within Sri Lanka
- Coordinates: 7.1734°N 80.5008°E
- Country: Sri Lanka
- Province: Sabaragamuwa Province
- District: Kegalle
- Time zone: UTC+5:30 (Sri Lanka Standard Time)
- Sri Lanka Post: 71530
- Area code: 035

Hemmathagama is a small town in the district of Kegalle in Sabaragamuwa province of Sri Lanka. Hemmathagama is connected to A1 highway by B279 road. Hemmathagama is a scenic town known for its natural beauty, and also played a significant role in Sri Lanka's history

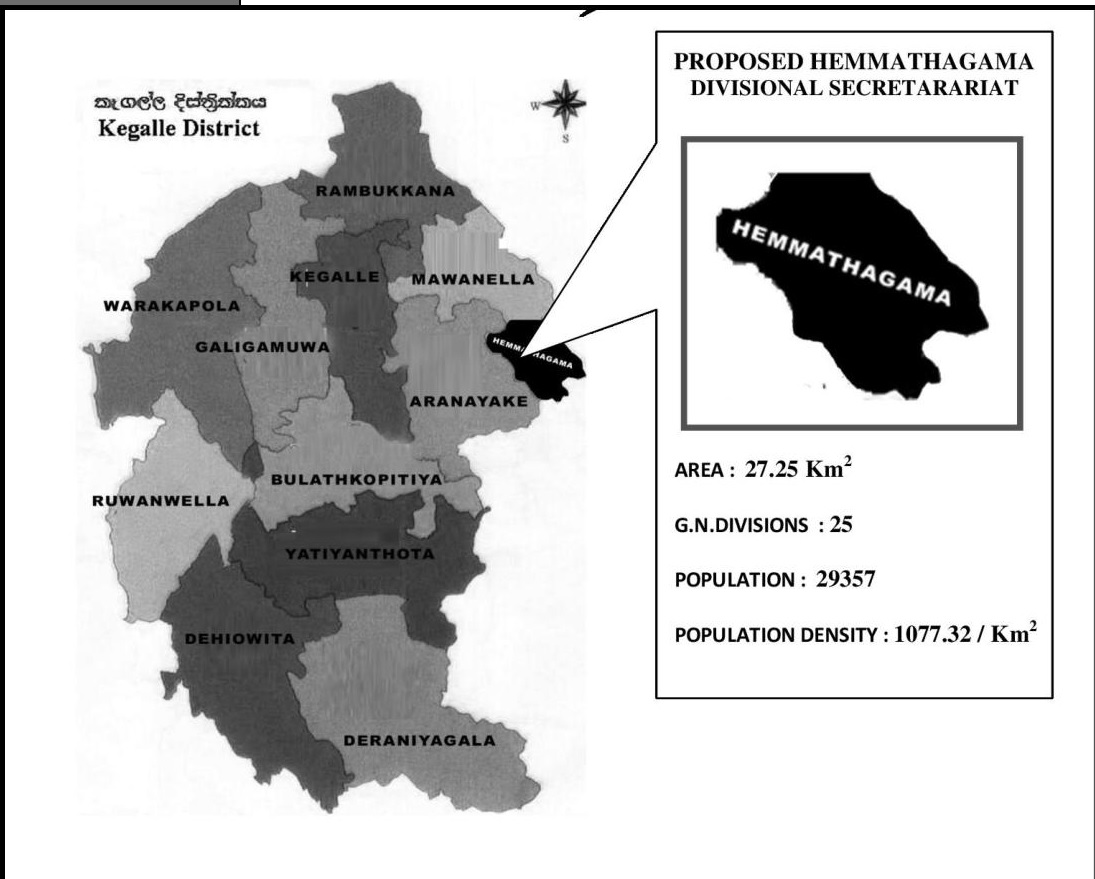
Area map of Hemmathagama

== People ==
As per the census of 2012, population of the town and surrounding area is 29537. The inhabitants of the town and surrounding areas are Muslims 42.53%, adhering to Sunni Islam and Sinhalese 56.8%Buddhists.

S/N	G.N Div Name	G.N Div No.	Population	Sinhala	Muslim	Tamil	Other
01	Verake	34	2963	2937	26	00	00
02	Ambilmeewala	34	481	480	00	00	01
03	Kumbalgama	35	830	830	00	00	00
04	Balawathgama	35A	984	982	00	02	00
05	Eraminigammana	36	1442	1442	00	00	00
06	Thambavita	36A	1143	1143	00	00	00
07	Ginihappitiya East	36B	1660	955	705	00	00
08	Ginihappitiya East	36C	1501	426	1070	05	00
09	Kuragala	37	661	660	00	01	00
10	Waduvawela	37A	1255	1255	00	00	00
11	Ambadedinya	37B	1001	1001	00	00	00
12	Weragoda	37C	542	542	00	00	00
13	Palliporuwa	38	1628	1625	00	00	00
14	Hemmathagama	38A	1127	1119	07	01	01
15	Kotegoda	-	1800	04	1796	00	00
16	Dumbuluwawa	39	2410	02	2402	06	00
17	Wadiyathenna	39A	1908	00	1908	00	00
18	Madolbowa	39B	1346	00	1341	05	00
19	Ambaruppa	39C	887	00	882	05	00
20	Kehelpannala East	40	819	805	10	04	00
21	Kehelpannala West	40A	812	812	00	00	00
22	Balathgamuwa	40B	591	566	00	25	00
23	Ambalawa	40C	1075	950	00	70	00
24	Yodhagama	44B	876	876	00	00	00
25	Randiligama	50D	952	952	00	00	00
26	Thalgaspitiya	-	1005	1005	00	00	00
	Total		29899				

Above mentioned data collected from PDA (Progressive Development Association)

== Education ==
There are two Navodya Schools, namely Al Azhar and Nagaragiri and one Maha Vidyalaya (Devi Balika). Also many primary schools are available in every surrounding villages.99 % of the inhabitants are literate (above 15 years of age) Further Hemmathagama is known for its rich educational background.

== Climate ==
Hemmathagama belongs to the Tropical Evergreen region of central Sri Lanka. The altitude of the area varies from 230 to 320 m above sea level. The average annual rainfall lies between 2500 and 4500 ml, and temperature of the region ranges between 22 degrees and 30 degrees Celsius. It receives most of the rain from Southwest Monsoon. The average wind speed has been measured to be approximately 7.2 km/hour, and humidity in the range lies between 57% and 90%. The whole region is mountainous, but the most famous mountain is the Elephant rock in Kotegoda.

== Health ==
The government hospital of Hemmathagama is providing the necessary medical facilities to the public. Also many clinics are available.

== Products ==
- Rubber
- Rice
- Coco
- Cardamom
- Coffee
- Mango
- Banana
- Coir
