= Kongur Rural District =

Rural district in Golestan province, Iran

Kongur Rural District Persian: دهستان كنگور
- Rural District
- Location within Iran
- Coordinates: 37°22′N 55°27′E
- Country: Iran
- Province: Golestan
- County: Kalaleh
- District: Central
- Established: 1987
- Capital: Kongur

Population (2016)
  - Total: 23,168
- Time zone: UTC+3:30 (IRST)

Kongur Rural District (Persian: دهستان كنگور) is in the Central District of Kalaleh County, Golestan province, Iran. Its capital is the village of Kongur.

== Demographics ==
=== Population ===
At the time of the 2006 National Census, the rural district's population was 21,115 in 4,807 households. There were 22,371 inhabitants in 5,959 households at the following census of 2011. The 2016 census measured the population of the rural district as 23,168 in 6,781 households. The most populous of its 47 villages was Kuseh, with 2,773 people.

=== Other villages in the rural district ===
- Abo ol-Hasan Khan
- Ali Eslami Yek
- Aman Khujeh
- Barani
- Barbar Qaleh
- Baynal
- Chaqar Shir Melli
- Dashti
- Enqelab
- Fathabad
- Garayili
- Garkaz
- Gav Mishli
- Hemmatabad-e Sistaniha
- Hajji Asharfian Yek
- Hajji Rezai
- Heydarabad-e Mohammad Shir
- Hoseyn Farid
- Iki Qad
- Khambarabad
- Khujehlar
- Mazraeh-ye Gerayili
- Mojaver
- Piruzabad
- Qanat-e Shir Mali
- Qarah Shur
- Qaravol-e Hajji Taji
- Qerqiz
- Qorban Sheykh
- Rusatai-ye Abuzer
- Rusatai-ye Ashura
- Rusatai-ye Belal
- Rusatai-ye Chamran
- Rusatai-ye Khan Baba Ahmadi
- Sadd-e Chamran
- Salman Farsi
- Sar Allah
- Sedaqati
- Shahid Beheshti
- Shahrak-e Jamhuri Eslami
- Tagak-e Emam Abdollah
- Tuqqeh
- Vahdat
- Zaboli Mahallah Qarah Shur
