= Šumbar Lake =

Lake complex in Karlovac County, Croatia

Coordinates: 45°36′N 15°44′E

The Šumbar Lake complex in Karlovac County, Croatia, consists of several large lakes, among which are Veliki Bajer (Big Lake), Desni Bajer (Right Lake) or Dugi Bajer (Long Lake) and Eko Lake. The lakes are in a resort area and are utilized primarily for sport fishing. Among other species, anglers catch carp, amur and perch.

== Geography ==
The lakes lie about 7 km northeast of Karlovac in the middle of a forested area, north of the Kupa river. The Šumbar Lake complex is not naturally occurring. The first lake formed in an area where clay had been excavated starting in the 19th century. Veliki Bajer (Big Lake) was excavated for clay starting in 1969.
