= Zavkuh Rural District =

Rural district in Golestan province, Iran

Zavkuh Rural District Persian: دهستان زاوكوه
- Rural District
- Location within Iran
- Coordinates: 37°39′N 55°37′E
- Country: Iran
- Province: Golestan
- County: Kalaleh
- District: Pishkamar
- Established: 1987
- Capital: Gukjeh

Population (2016)
  - Total: 6,397
- Time zone: UTC+3:30 (IRST)

Zavkuh Rural District (Persian: دهستان زاوكوه) is in Pishkamar District of Kalaleh County, Golestan province, Iran. Its capital is the village of Gukjeh. The previous capital of the rural district was the village of Pishkamar, now the city of Faraghi.

== Demographics ==
=== Population ===
At the time of the 2006 National Census, the rural district's population (as a part of the Central District) was 23,610 in 4,863 households. There were 11,765 inhabitants in 3,086 households at the following census of 2011, by which time the rural district had been separated from the district in the formation of Pishkamar District. The 2016 census measured the population of the rural district as 6,397 in 1,877 households. The most populous of its 12 villages was Qareh Aghach, with 1,445 people.

=== Other villages in the rural district ===
- Aq Yaji
- Araz Ali Sheykh
- Choruk-e Pishkamar
- Hajji Beyk-e Olya
- Hajji Beyk-e Sofla
- Kaser-e Pishkamar
- Kowli-ye Bayandor
- Pashai
- Qareh Said
