= Pishkamar District =

District in Golestan province, Iran

Pishkamar District Persian: بخش پیش‌کمر
- District
- Location within Iran
- Coordinates: 37°34′N 55°47′E
- Country: Iran
- Province: Golestan
- County: Kalaleh
- Established: 2007
- Capital: Faraghi

Population (2016)
  - Total: 26,977
- Time zone: UTC+3:30 (IRST)

Pishkamar District (Persian: بخش پیش‌کمر) is in Kalaleh County, Golestan province, Iran. Its capital is the city of Faraghi. (Note: Formerly the village of Pishkamar)

== History ==
In 2007, Zavkuh Rural District was separated from the Central District in the formation of Pishkamar District. The village of Pishkamar was converted to a city as Faraghi in 2012.

== Demographics ==
=== Population ===
At the time of the 2011 National Census, the district's population was 26,409 people in 6,529 households. The 2016 census measured the population of the district as 26,977 inhabitants in 7,394 households.

=== Administrative divisions ===
Pishkamar District Population
Administrative Divisions	2011	2016
Arab Dagh RD	14,644	14,803
Zavkuh RD	11,765	6,397
Faraghi (city)		5,777
Total	26,409	26,977
RD = Rural District
