= Kalaleh County =

County in Golestan Province, Iran

Kalaleh County Persian: شهرستان کلاله
- County
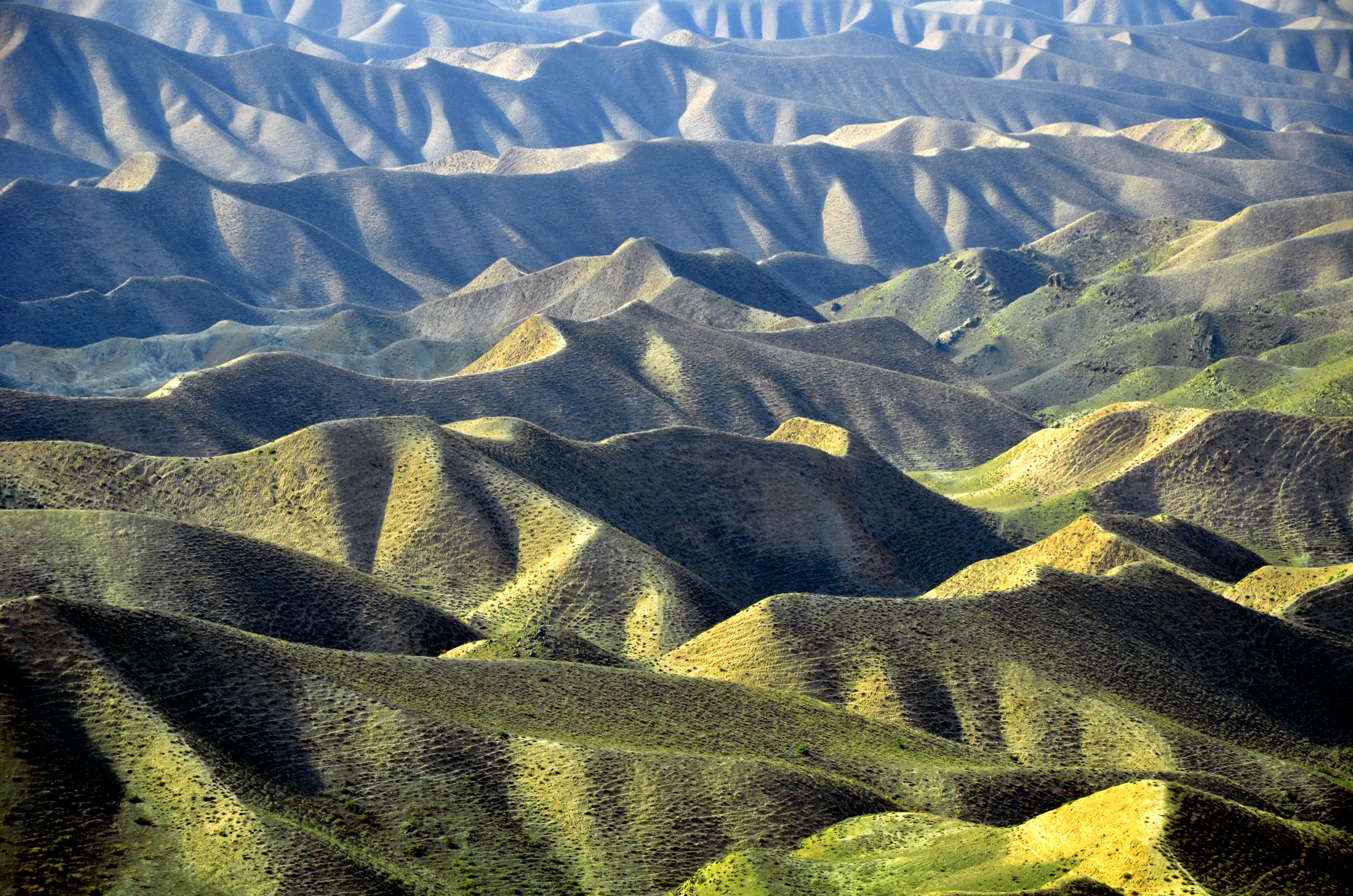
- Rugged landscape in Kalaleh County

- Location of Kalaleh County in Golestan province (top, pink)

- Location of Golestan province in Iran
- Coordinates: 37°34′N 55°41′E
- Country: Iran
- Province: Golestan
- Established: 2000
- Capital: Kalaleh
- Districts: Central, Pishkamar

Population (2016)
  - Total: 117,319
- Time zone: UTC+3:30 (IRST)

Kalaleh County (Persian: شهرستان کلاله) is in Golestan province, Iran. Its capital is the city of Kalaleh.

== History ==
In 2007, Maraveh Tappeh District was separated from the county in the establishment of Maraveh Tappeh County. At the same time, Zavkuh Rural District was separated from the Central District in the formation of Pishkamar District, which was divided into two rural districts, including the new Arab Dagh Rural District. The village of Pishkamar was converted to a city and renamed Faraghi in 2012.

== Demographics ==
=== Population ===
At the time of the 2006 National Census, the county's population was 149,857 in 31,475 households. The following census in 2011 counted 110,473 people in 28,483 households. The 2016 census measured the population of the county as 117,319 in 32,998 households.

=== Administrative divisions ===
Kalaleh County's population history and administrative structure over three consecutive censuses are shown in the following table.

Kalaleh County Population
Administrative Divisions	2006	2011	2016
Central District	103,983	84,064	90,342
Aq Su RD	14,972	17,342	13,166
Kongur RD	21,115	22,371	23,168
Tamran RD	16,625	16,400	17,832
Zavkuh RD	23,610		
Kalaleh (city)	27,661	27,951	36,176
Maraveh Tappeh District (Note: Transferred to Maraveh Tappeh County)	45,874		
Golidagh RD	16,506		
Maraveh Tappeh RD	23,766		
Maraveh Tappeh (city)	5,602		
Pishkamar District		26,409	26,977
Arab Dagh RD		14,644	14,803
Zavkuh RD		11,765	6,397
Faraghi (city) (Note: Formerly the village of Pishkamar; became a city after the 2011 census)			5,777
Total	149,857	110,473	117,319
RD = Rural District

== See also ==
Media related to Kalaleh County at Wikimedia Commons
