= Central District (Kalaleh County) =

District in Golestan province, Iran

Central District (Kalaleh County) Persian: بخش مرکزی شهرستان کلاله
- District
- Location within Iran
- Coordinates: 37°33′N 55°30′E
- Country: Iran
- Province: Golestan
- County: Kalaleh
- Established: 2000
- Capital: Kalaleh

Population (2016)
  - Total: 90,342
- Time zone: UTC+3:30 (IRST)

The Central District of Kalaleh County (Persian: بخش مرکزی شهرستان کلاله) is in Golestan province, Iran. Its capital is the city of Kalaleh.

== History ==
In 2000, Zavkuh Rural District was separated from the district in the formation of Pishkamar District.

== Demographics ==
=== Population ===
At the time of the 2006 National Census, the district's population was 103,983 in 22,536 households. The following census in 2011 counted 84,064 people in 21,970 households. The 2016 census measured the population of the district as 90,342 inhabitants in 25,604 households.

=== Administrative divisions ===
Central District (Kalaleh County) Population
Administrative Divisions	2006	2011	2016
Aq Su RD	14,972	17,342	13,166
Kongur RD	21,115	22,371	23,168
Tamran RD	16,625	16,400	17,832
Zavkuh RD (Note: Transferred to Pishkamar District)	23,610		
Kalaleh (city)	27,661	27,951	36,176
Total	103,983	84,064	90,342
RD = Rural District
