= Khalilabad =

Khalilabad may refer to:

== Azerbaijan ==
- Xəlilabad, village in Azerbaijan

== India ==
- Khalilabad, India, city in Uttar Pradesh, India, headquarters of Sant Kabir Nagar district
  - Khalilabad (Lok Sabha constituency)
  - Khalilabad (Assembly constituency)
  - Khalilabad railway station

== Iran ==
=== Chaharmahal and Bakhtiari Province ===
- Khalilabad, Milas, a village in Lordegan County
- Khalilabad, Rig, a village in Lordegan County

=== East Azerbaijan Province ===
- Khalilabad, East Azerbaijan, a village in Bonab County

=== Fars Province ===
- Khalilabad, Fars, a village in Zarrin Dasht County

=== Isfahan Province ===
- Khalilabad, Isfahan, a village in Fereydunshahr County

=== Kerman Province ===
- Khalilabad, Anbarabad, a village in Anbarabad County
- Khalilabad, Kerman, a village in Kerman County
- Khalilabad, Sirjan, a village in Sirjan County
- Khalilabad, Sharifabad, a village in Sirjan County

=== Kermanshah Province ===
- Khalilabad, Kermanshah, a village in Kangavar County

=== Lorestan Province ===
- Khalilabad, Delfan, a village in Lorestan Province, Iran

=== Markazi Province ===
- Khalilabad, Markazi, a village in Khomeyn County

=== Razavi Khorasan Province ===
- Khalilabad, Iran, a city in Razavi Khorasan Province, Iran
- Khalilabad, Dargaz, a village in Razavi Khorasan Province, Iran
- Khalilabad, Fariman, a village in Razavi Khorasan Province, Iran
- Khalilabad, Joghatai, a village in Razavi Khorasan Province, Iran
- Khalilabad, Khvaf, a village in Razavi Khorasan Province, Iran
- Khalilabad, Torbat-e Jam, a village in Razavi Khorasan Province, Iran
- Khalilabad County, in Iran

=== Sistan and Baluchestan Province ===
- Khalilabad, Iranshahr, a village in Iranshahr County
- Khalilabad, Nukabad, a village in Khash County

=== Yazd Province ===
- Khalilabad, Ardakan, a village in Ardakan County
- Khalilabad (31°47′ N 54°13′ E), Taft, a village in Taft County

== Pakistan ==
- Khalilabad, Pakistan

== See also ==
- Kalilabad
