= Mian Deh =

Mian Deh or Meyan Deh or Miyandeh or Miandeh or Meyandeh (Persian: ميانده) may refer to:

== Afghanistan ==
- Mian Deh, Badakhshan
- Mian Deh, Takhar

== Iran ==
- Miyan Deh, Fasa, Fars Province
- Miandeh, Zarrin Dasht, Fars Province
- Miandeh, Rasht, Gilan Province
- Miandeh, Rudsar, Gilan Province
- Miandeh, Sowme'eh Sara, Gilan Province
- Miandeh-ye Pain, Gilan Province
- Mian Deh, Hamadan
- Mian Deh, Baft, Kerman Province
- Mian Deh, Jiroft, Kerman Province
- Mian Deh, Jebalbarez, Jiroft County, Kerman Province
- Mian Deh, Rudbar-e Jonubi, Kerman Province
- Mian Deh, Chalus, Mazandaran Province
- Miandeh, Juybar, Mazandaran Province
- Miyandeh, Razavi Khorasan
- Miyan Deh Rural District, in Fars Province

== See also ==
- Deh Mian (disambiguation)
