= Deh Now, Zarrin Dasht =

Village in Fars province, Iran

Deh Now Persian: دهنو
- Village
- Location within Iran
- Coordinates: 28°20′41″N 54°14′33″E
- Country: Iran
- Province: Fars
- County: Zarrin Dasht
- District: Izadkhast
- Rural District: Izadkhast-e Gharbi

Population (2016)
  - Total: 2,252
- Time zone: UTC+3:30 (IRST)

Deh Now (Persian: دهنو) (Note: Also romanized as Deh-e Now; also known as Dehnow Izad Khast) is a village in Izadkhast-e Gharbi Rural District (Note: Formerly Izadkhast Rural District) of Izadkhast District, Zarrin Dasht County, Fars province, Iran.

== Demographics ==
=== Population ===
At the time of the 2006 National Census, the village's population was 1,940 in 420 households, when it was in Dobiran Rural District of the Central District. The following census in 2011 counted 2,184 people in 563 households, by which time the village had been transferred to Izadkhast-e Gharbi Rural District of Izadkhast District. The 2016 census measured the population of the village as 2,252 people in 636 households. It was the most populous village in its rural district.
