= Chah Zebar =

Chah Zebar چاه زبر
- Village
- Location within Iran
- Coordinates: 28°16′44″N 54°34′07″E
- Country: Iran
- Province: Fars
- County: Zarrin Dasht
- Bakhsh: Izadkhvast
- Rural District: Izadkhvast-e Sharqi

Population (2006)
  - Total: 252
- Time zone: UTC+3:30 (IRST)
  - Summer (DST): UTC+4:30 (IRDT)

Chah Zebar (Persian: چاه زبر, also Romanized as Chāh Zebar and Chah-e Zebar; also known as Chāh-e Zebar Bondasht, Chāh-e Zebr-e Bon Dasht, and Chāh Zebr Bondasht) is a village in Izadkhvast-e Sharqi Rural District, Izadkhvast District, Zarrin Dasht County, Fars province, Iran. At the 2006 census, its population was 252, in 73 families.
