= Sachun =

Sachun ساچون
- Location within Iran
- Coordinates: 28°32′42″N 54°28′56″E
- Country: Iran
- Province: Fars
- County: Zarrin Dasht
- Bakhsh: Central
- Rural District: Khosuyeh

Population (2006)
  - Total: 1,160
- Time zone: UTC+3:30 (IRST)
  - Summer (DST): UTC+4:30 (IRDT)

Sachun (Persian: ساچون, also Romanized as Sāchūn and Sachoon; also known as Sāchūm) is a village in Khosuyeh Rural District, in the Central District of Zarrin Dasht County, Fars province, Iran. At the 2006 census, its population was 1,160, in 264 families.
