= Darreh Shur, Fars =

Darreh Shur دره شور
- Village
- Location within Iran
- Coordinates: 28°17′46″N 54°22′52″E
- Country: Iran
- Province: Fars
- County: Zarrin Dasht
- Bakhsh: Izadkhvast
- Rural District: Izadkhvast-e Gharbi

Population (2006)
  - Total: 1,761
- Time zone: UTC+3:30 (IRST)
  - Summer (DST): UTC+4:30 (IRDT)

Darreh Shur (Persian: دره شور, also Romanized as Darreh Shūr, Dareh Shoor, and Darreh-ye Shūr) is a village in Izadkhvast-e Gharbi Rural District, Izadkhvast District, Zarrin Dasht County, Fars province, Iran. At the 2006 census, its population was 1,761, in 395 families.
