= Kanjvaran =

Kanjvaran or Kanjuran (Persian: كنجوران), also rendered as Ganjavran and Ganjuran, and also known as Gheyb Qoli, may refer to:

- Kanjvaran-e Olya
- Kanjvaran-e Sofla
- Kanjvaran-e Vosta
