= Emamzadeh Shah Alamdar =

Emamzadeh Shah Alamdar امامزاده شاه علمدار
- Village
- Location within Iran
- Coordinates: 28°22′48″N 54°03′47″E
- Country: Iran
- Province: Fars
- County: Zarrin Dasht
- Bakhsh: Central
- Rural District: Dabiran

Population (2006)
  - Total: 37
- Time zone: UTC+3:30 (IRST)
  - Summer (DST): UTC+4:30 (IRDT)

Emamzadeh Shah Alamdar (Persian: امامزاده شاه علمدار, also Romanized as Emāmzādeh Shāh 'Alamdār and Emāmzādeh-ye Shāh 'Alamdār; also known as Shāh 'Alamdār) is a village in Dowbaran Rural District, in the Central District of Zarrin Dasht County, Fars province, Iran. At the 2006 census, its population was 37, in 7 families.
