= Shahnabad =

Shahnabad (Persian: شهن آباد), also rendered as Shahinabad, may refer to one of the following villages in Iran:

- Shanabad, Hamadan Province
- Shahnabad, Lorestan
- Shahnabad, Razavi Khorasan
- Shahinabad, Oshnavieh, West Azerbaijan Province
- Shahinabad, Urmia, West Azerbaijan Province
