= Hajji Tahereh =

Hajji Tahereh حاجي طاهره
- Village
- Location within Iran
- Coordinates: 28°21′30″N 54°32′26″E
- Country: Iran
- Province: Fars
- County: Zarrin Dasht
- Bakhsh: Central
- Rural District: Zirab

Population (2006)
  - Total: 704
- Time zone: UTC+3:30 (IRST)
  - Summer (DST): UTC+4:30 (IRDT)

Hajji Tahereh (Persian: حاجي طاهره, also Romanized as Ḩājjī Ţāhereh and Ḩājī Ţāhereh; also known as Hājī Tāher, Ḩājjī Ţāher, and Ḩājjī Ţāherī) is a village in Zirab Rural District, in the Central District of Zarrin Dasht County, Fars province, Iran. At the 2006 census, its population was 704, in 142 families.
