= Shabakeh-ye Bon Dasht =

Shabakeh-ye Bon Dasht شبكه بن دشت
- Village
- Location within Iran
- Coordinates: 28°14′11″N 54°40′18″E
- Country: Iran
- Province: Fars
- County: Zarrin Dasht
- Bakhsh: Izadkhvast
- Rural District: Izadkhvast-e Sharqi

Population (2006)
  - Total: 631
- Time zone: UTC+3:30 (IRST)
  - Summer (DST): UTC+4:30 (IRDT)

Shabakeh-ye Bon Dasht (Persian: شبكه بن دشت, also Romanized as Shabakeh-ye Bondasht and Shabakeh Bondasht; also known as Bondasht, Boneh Dasht, and Bundasht) is a village in Izadkhvast-e Sharqi Rural District, Izadkhvast District, Zarrin Dasht County, Fars province, Iran. At the 2006 census, its population was 631, in 134 families.
