= Qaleh-ye Kaduyeh =

Qaleh-ye Kaduyeh قلعه كدويه
- Village
- Location within Iran
- Coordinates: 28°32′39″N 54°26′37″E
- Country: Iran
- Province: Fars
- County: Zarrin Dasht
- Bakhsh: Central
- Rural District: Khosuyeh

Population (2006)
  - Total: 179
- Time zone: UTC+3:30 (IRST)
  - Summer (DST): UTC+4:30 (IRDT)

Qaleh-ye Kaduyeh (Persian: قلعه كدويه, also Romanized as Qal‘eh-ye Kadūyeh; also known as Kadūyeh) is a village in Khosuyeh Rural District, in the Central District of Zarrin Dasht County, Fars province, Iran. At the 2006 census, its population was 179, in 48 families.
