= Galugah, Fars =

Galugah گلوگاه
- Village
- Location within Iran
- Coordinates: 28°23′08″N 54°21′07″E
- Country: Iran
- Province: Fars
- County: Zarrin Dasht
- Bakhsh: Central
- Rural District: Zirab

Population (2006)
  - Total: 996
- Time zone: UTC+3:30 (IRST)
  - Summer (DST): UTC+4:30 (IRDT)

Galugah (Persian: گلوگاه, also Romanized as Galūgāh; also known as Soleymānī) is a village in Zirab Rural District, in the Central District of Zarrin Dasht County, Fars province, Iran. At the 2006 census, its population was 996, in 206 families.
