= Shahrak-e Khalilabad =

Shahrak-e Khalilabad شهرك خليل اباد
- Village
- Location within Iran
- Coordinates: 28°31′44″N 54°27′40″E
- Country: Iran
- Province: Fars
- County: Zarrin Dasht
- Bakhsh: Central
- Rural District: Khosuyeh

Population (2006)
  - Total: 1,171
- Time zone: UTC+3:30 (IRST)
  - Summer (DST): UTC+4:30 (IRDT)

Shahrak-e Khalilabad (Persian: شهرك خليل اباد, also Romanized as Shahrak-e Khalīlābād; also known as Khalīlābāb and Khalīlābād) is a village in Khosuyeh Rural District, in the Central District of Zarrin Dasht County, Fars province, Iran. At the 2006 census, its population was 1,171, in 262 families.
