= Tall-e Rigi, Zarrin Dasht =

Tall-e Rigi تل ريگي
- Village
- Location within Iran
- Coordinates: 28°33′11″N 54°23′31″E
- Country: Iran
- Province: Fars
- County: Zarrin Dasht
- Bakhsh: Central
- Rural District: Khosuyeh

Population (2006)
  - Total: 887
- Time zone: UTC+3:30 (IRST)
  - Summer (DST): UTC+4:30 (IRDT)

Tall-e Rigi (Persian: تل ريگي, also Romanized as Tall-e Rīgī, Tal Rīgī, and Tol Rīgī; also known as Tall-e Rīgī-ye Pā’īn and Tol Rīg) is a village in Khosuyeh Rural District, in the Central District of Zarrin Dasht County, Fars province, Iran. At the 2006 census, its population was 887, in 197 families.
