= Mazayjan, Zarrin Dasht =

Village in Fars province, Iran

Mazayjan Persian: مزايجان
- Village
- Location within Iran
- Coordinates: 28°03′23″N 54°39′16″E
- Country: Iran
- Province: Fars
- County: Zarrin Dasht
- District: Izadkhast
- Rural District: Izadkhast-e Sharqi

Population (2016)
  - Total: 2,655
- Time zone: UTC+3:30 (IRST)

Mazayjan (Persian: مزايجان) (Note: Also romanized as Mazāyejān and Mazāyjān) is a village in Izadkhast-e Sharqi Rural District of Izadkhast District, Zarrin Dasht County, Fars province, Iran.

== Demographics ==
=== Population ===
At the time of the 2006 National Census, the village's population was 2,116 in 454 households. The following census in 2011 counted 2,648 people in 631 households. The 2016 census measured the population of the village as 2,655 people in 709 households. It was the most populous village in its rural district.
