= Khosuyeh =

Village in Fars province, Iran

Khosuyeh Persian: خسويه
- Village
- Location within Iran
- Coordinates: 28°32′35″N 54°23′14″E
- Country: Iran
- Province: Fars
- County: Zarrin Dasht
- District: Central
- Rural District: Khosuyeh

Population (2016)
  - Total: 2,856
- Time zone: UTC+3:30 (IRST)

Khosuyeh (Persian: خسويه) (Note: Also romanized as Khosūyeh; also known as Khusu) is a village in, and the capital of, Khosuyeh Rural District of the Central District of Zarrin Dasht County, Fars province, Iran.

== Demographics ==
=== Population ===
At the time of the 2006 National Census, the village's population was 2,793 in 630 households. The following census in 2011 counted 2,681 people in 710 households. The 2016 census measured the population of the village as 2,856 people in 851 households. It was the most populous village in its rural district.
