= Tajabad, Zarrin Dasht =

Tajabad تاج اباد
- Village
- Location within Iran
- Coordinates: 28°31′41″N 54°26′54″E
- Country: Iran
- Province: Fars
- County: Zarrin Dasht
- Bakhsh: Central
- Rural District: Khosuyeh

Population (2006)
  - Total: 738
- Time zone: UTC+3:30 (IRST)
  - Summer (DST): UTC+4:30 (IRDT)

Tajabad (Persian: تاج اباد, also Romanized as Tājābād; also known as Tājābād-e Pā’īn, Tājābād-e Soflá, and Taj Abad Sofla) is a village in Khosuyeh Rural District, in the Central District of Zarrin Dasht County, Fars province, Iran. At the 2006 census, its population was 738, in 139 families.
