= Darva =

Darva (Persian: دروا or دروائ) may refer to:

- Darva, Fars (دروائ - Darvā’), a village in Fars Province, Iran
- Darva, Kerman (دروا - Darvā), a village in Kerman Province, Iran
- Darva, Hormozgan (دروا - Darvā), a village in Hormozgan Province, Iran

== See also ==
- Darva Conger
