= Qolqol Rud =

Qolqol Rud (Persian: قلقل‌رود) may refer to:

- Qolqol Rud District
- Qolqol Rud Rural District
