= Miandeh, Zarrin Dasht =

Miandeh ميانده
- Village
- Location within Iran
- Coordinates: 28°31′09″N 54°25′08″E
- Country: Iran
- Province: Fars
- County: Zarrin Dasht
- Bakhsh: Central
- Rural District: Khosuyeh

Population (2006)
  - Total: 1,385
- Time zone: UTC+3:30 (IRST)
  - Summer (DST): UTC+4:30 (IRDT)

Miandeh (Persian: ميانده, also Romanized as Mīāndeh, Meyāndeh, and Mīyān Deh) is a village in Khosuyeh Rural District, in the Central District of Zarrin Dasht County, Fars province, Iran. At the 2006 census, its population was 1,385, in 289 families.
