= Darvazeh =

Darvazeh (Persian: داروزه or دروازه) may refer to:

- Darvazeh, Hamadan (دروازه - Darvāzeh)
- Darvazeh, Lorestan (داروزه - Dārvazeh)

== See also ==
- Derweze (Darvaza), Turkemenistan
