= Mehran Kashani =

Iranian screenwriter

Mehran Kashani مهران کاشانی
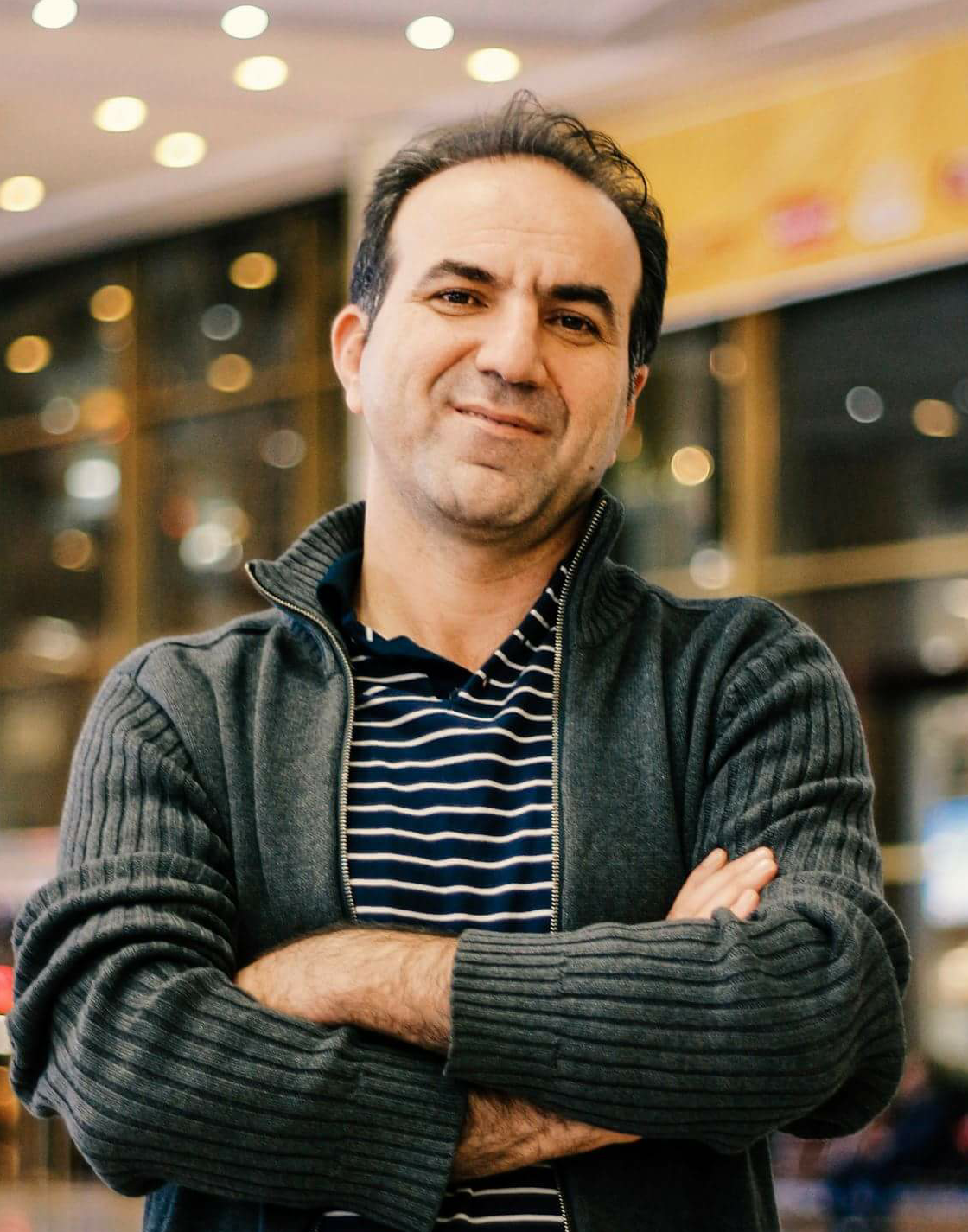
- Born: 1969 (age 56–57); Masjed Soleiman, Iran
- Occupation: Screenwriter

Mehran Kashani (Persian: مهران کاشانی; born 1969), is an Iranian screenwriter. Graduated as a mechanical engineer, Kashani began his career in cinema as assistant director in Under the Moonlight and Here Is A Shining Light Directed by Reza Mirkarimi, in the latter he was also the script consultant. Since 2003, Kashani has continued his writing career and worked with famous Iranian Directors such as Majid Majidi and Reza Mirkarimi.

He has also played a role in Mirkarimi's As Simple as That (film).

== Filmography ==
Year	Film	Director	Notes
2017	Beyond the Clouds (2017 film)	Majid Majidi	
2015	Daughter (2016 film)	Reza Mirkarimi	
2013	Negar's Role	Ali Atshani	
2009	The Other	Mehdi Rahmani	
2008	The Song of Sparrows	Majid Majidi	Written by: Majidi and Kashani
2005	Khaneye Roshan (The Bright House)	Vahid Mousaian	
2005	Dame sobh (Day Break)	Hamid Rahmanian	
2003	Sunflower Farm	Fereidoun Hassanpour	
