= Zir Ab =

Zir Ab (Persian: زيراب) may refer to:

- Zirab, Fars, a village in Zarrin Dasht County, Fars province, Iran
- Zirab Rural District, an administrative division of Zarrin Dasht County, Fars province
- Zir Ab (ruins), ruins in Isfahan province, Iran
- Zir Ab, Khuzestan, a village in Khuzestan province, Iran
- Zirab, a city in Mazardaran province, Iran
