= Karkhaneh, Hamadan =

Karkhaneh كارخانه
- Village
- Location within Iran
- Coordinates: 34°25′32″N 48°11′17″E
- Country: Iran
- Province: Hamadan
- County: Tuyserkan
- Bakhsh: Qolqol Rud
- Rural District: Miyan Rud

Population (2006)
  - Total: 310
- Time zone: UTC+3:30 (IRST)
  - Summer (DST): UTC+4:30 (IRDT)

Karkhaneh (Persian: كارخانه, also Romanized as Kārkhāneh) is a village in Miyan Rud Rural District, Qolqol Rud District, Tuyserkan County, Hamadan Province, Iran. At the 2006 census, its population was 310, in 91 families.
