= Golkan =

Golkan (Persian: گل كن) may refer to:

- Golkan, Fars
- Golkan, Sistan and Baluchestan
