= Tol Rigi =

Tol Rigi or Tall-e Rigi or Tal Rigi or (Persian: تل ريگي) may refer to:

- Tol Rigi, Jahrom
- Tall-e Rigi, Zarrin Dasht
