= Abgarm-e Balayi =

Village in Fars province, Iran

Abgarm-e Balayi Persian: ابگرم بالايي
- Village
- Country: Iran
- Province: Fars
- County: Zarrin Dasht
- District: Central
- Rural District: Dobiran

Population (2016)
  - Total: 312
- Time zone: UTC+3:30 (IRST)

Abgarm-e Balayi (Persian: ابگرم بالايي) is a village in Dobiran Rural District (Note: Formerly Dasht-e Khak Rural District) of the Central District of Zarrin Dasht County, Fars province, Iran.

== Demographics ==
=== Population ===
At the time of the 2016 National Census, the village's population was 312 people in 67 households. It was the most populous village in its rural district.
