= Darva, Fars =

Darva دروائ
- Village
- Location within Iran
- Coordinates: 28°30′08″N 54°21′48″E
- Country: Iran
- Province: Fars
- County: Zarrin Dasht
- Bakhsh: Central
- Rural District: Khosuyeh

Population (2006)
  - Total: 2,225
- Time zone: UTC+3:30 (IRST)
  - Summer (DST): UTC+4:30 (IRDT)

Darva (Persian: دروائ, also Romanized as Darvā' and Darvā; also known as Darvāy-e Khosvīeh) is a village in Khosuyeh Rural District, in the Central District of Zarrin Dasht County, Fars province, Iran. At the 2006 census, its population was 2,225, in 507 families.
