= Barfian =

Barfian or Barfeyan or Barfiyan (Persian: برفيان) may refer to:

- Barfiyan, Hamadan
- Barfian, Markazi
