= Baba Kamal, Hamadan =

Village in Hamadan province, Iran

Baba Kamal Persian: باباكمال
- Village
- Location within Iran
- Coordinates: 34°21′32″N 48°25′15″E
- Country: Iran
- Province: Hamadan
- County: Tuyserkan
- District: Qolqol Rud
- Rural District: Kamal Rud

Population (2016)
  - Total: 610
- Time zone: UTC+3:30 (IRST)

Baba Kamal (Persian: باباكمال) (Note: Also romanized as Bābā Kamāl) is a village in Kamal Rud Rural District of Qolqol Rud District in Tuyserkan County, Hamadan province, Iran.

== Demographics ==
=== Population ===
At the time of the 2006 National Census, the village's population was 830 in 220 households. The following census in 2011 counted 705 people in 216 households. The 2016 census measured the population of the village as 610 people in 209 households.
