= Sutlaq =

Village in Hamadan province, Iran

Sutlaq Persian: سوتلق
- Village
- Location within Iran
- Coordinates: 34°34′35″N 48°16′39″E
- Country: Iran
- Province: Hamadan
- County: Tuyserkan
- District: Qolqol Rud
- Rural District: Qolqol Rud

Population (2016)
  - Total: 637
- Time zone: UTC+3:30 (IRST)

Sutlaq (Persian: سوتلق) (Note: Also romanized as Sūtlaq; also known as Sūltaq) is a village in Qolqol Rud Rural District of Qolqol Rud District in Tuyserkan County, Hamadan province, Iran.

== Demographics ==
=== Population ===
At the time of the 2006 National Census, the village's population was 1,004 in 226 households. The following census in 2011 counted 905 people in 284 households. The 2016 census measured the population of the village as 637 people in 213 households.
