= Qoli Laleh-ye Olya =

Qoli Laleh-ye Olya قلي لاله عليا
- Village
- Location within Iran
- Coordinates: 34°33′40″N 48°14′57″E
- Country: Iran
- Province: Hamadan
- County: Tuyserkan
- Bakhsh: Qolqol Rud
- Rural District: Qolqol Rud

Population (2006)
  - Total: 42
- Time zone: UTC+3:30 (IRST)
  - Summer (DST): UTC+4:30 (IRDT)

Qoli Laleh-ye Olya (Persian: قلي لاله عليا, also Romanized as Qolī Lāleh-ye ‘Olyā; also known as Qolī Lāleh Bālā and Qolī Lāleh-ye Bālā) is a village in Qolqol Rud Rural District, Qolqol Rud District, Tuyserkan County, Hamadan Province, Iran. At the 2006 census, its population was 42, in 10 families.
