= Moradabad, Tuyserkan =

Village in Hamadan province, Iran

Moradabad Persian: مراداباد
- Village
- Location within Iran
- Coordinates: 34°30′27″N 48°09′28″E
- Country: Iran
- Province: Hamadan
- County: Tuyserkan
- District: Qolqol Rud
- Rural District: Miyan Rud

Population (2016)
  - Total: 599
- Time zone: UTC+3:30 (IRST)

Moradabad (Persian: مراداباد) (Note: Also romanized as Morādābād; also known as Murādābād) is a village in Miyan Rud Rural District of Qolqol Rud District in Tuyserkan County, Hamadan province, Iran.

== Demographics ==
=== Population ===
At the time of the 2006 National Census, the village's population was 627 in 137 households. The following census in 2011 counted 616 people in 166 households. The 2016 census measured the population of the village as 599 people in 179 households.
