= Hamilabad =

Village in Hamadan province, Iran

Hamilabad Persian: حميل اباد
- Village
- Location within Iran
- Coordinates: 34°24′09″N 48°27′39″E
- Country: Iran
- Province: Hamadan
- County: Tuyserkan
- District: Qolqol Rud
- Rural District: Kamal Rud

Population (2016)
  - Total: 216
- Time zone: UTC+3:30 (IRST)

Hamilabad (Persian: حميل اباد) (Note: Also romanized as Ḩamīlābād; also known as Jamīlābād) is a village in Kamal Rud Rural District of Qolqol Rud District in Tuyserkan County, Hamadan province, Iran.

== Demographics ==
=== Population ===
At the time of the 2006 National Census, the village's population was 262 in 65 households. The following census in 2011 counted 250 people in 64 households. The 2016 census measured the population of the village as 216 people in 63 households.
