= Qasemabad, Tuyserkan =

Village in Hamadan province, Iran

Qasemabad Persian: قاسم اباد
- Village
- Location within Iran
- Coordinates: 34°27′55″N 48°15′12″E
- Country: Iran
- Province: Hamadan
- County: Tuyserkan
- District: Qolqol Rud
- Rural District: Qolqol Rud

Population (2016)
  - Total: 504
- Time zone: UTC+3:30 (IRST)

Qasemabad (Persian: قاسم اباد) (Note: Also romanized as Qāsemābād) is a village in Qolqol Rud Rural District of Qolqol Rud District in Tuyserkan County, Hamadan province, Iran.

== Demographics ==
=== Population ===
At the time of the 2006 National Census, the village's population was 578 in 125 households. The following census in 2011 counted 621 people in 184 households. The 2016 census measured the population of the village as 504 people in 145 households.
