= Velashjerd, Tuyserkan =

Village in Hamadan province, Iran

Velashjerd Persian: ولاشجرد
- Village
- Location within Iran
- Coordinates: 34°32′08″N 48°07′08″E
- Country: Iran
- Province: Hamadan
- County: Tuyserkan
- District: Qolqol Rud
- Rural District: Miyan Rud

Population (2016)
  - Total: 934
- Time zone: UTC+3:30 (IRST)

Velashjerd (Persian: ولاشجرد) (Note: Also romanized as Velāshjerd; also known as Vāl Shāgerd and Wāla Shāgird) is a village in, and the capital of, Miyan Rud Rural District in Qolqol Rud District of Tuyserkan County, Hamadan province, Iran.

== Demographics ==
=== Population ===
At the time of the 2006 National Census, the village's population was 1,348 in 286 households. The following census in 2011 counted 1,168 people in 340 households. The 2016 census measured the population of the village as 934 people in 288 households.
