= Jera, Iran =

Village in Hamadan province, Iran

Jera Persian: جرا
- Village
- Location within Iran
- Coordinates: 34°24′48″N 48°17′42″E
- Country: Iran
- Province: Hamadan
- County: Tuyserkan
- District: Qolqol Rud
- Rural District: Qolqol Rud

Population (2016)
  - Total: 626
- Time zone: UTC+3:30 (IRST)

Jera (Persian: جرا) (Note: Also romanized as Jerā) is a village in Qolqol Rud Rural District of Qolqol Rud District in Tuyserkan County, Hamadan province, Iran.

== Demographics ==
=== Population ===
At the time of the 2006 National Census, the village's population was 998 in 229 households. The following census in 2011 counted 875 people in 231 households. The 2016 census measured the population of the village as 626 people in 169 households.
