= Abu Darda, Iran =

Village in Hamadan province, Iran

Abu Darda Persian: ابودردا
- Village
- Location within Iran
- Coordinates: 34°24′21″N 48°22′18″E
- Country: Iran
- Province: Hamadan
- County: Tuyserkan
- District: Qolqol Rud
- Rural District: Kamal Rud

Population (2016)
  - Total: 82
- Time zone: UTC+3:30 (IRST)

Abu Darda (Persian: ابودردا) (Note: Also romanized as Abū Dardā) is a village in Kamal Rud Rural District of Qolqol Rud District in Tuyserkan County, Hamadan province, Iran.

== Demographics ==
=== Population ===
At the time of the 2006 National Census, the village's population was 55 in 12 households. The following census in 2011 counted 96 people in 30 households. The 2016 census measured the population of the village as 82 people in 28 households.
