= Neustadtgödens synagogue =

Coordinates: 53°28′36″N 7°59′24″E

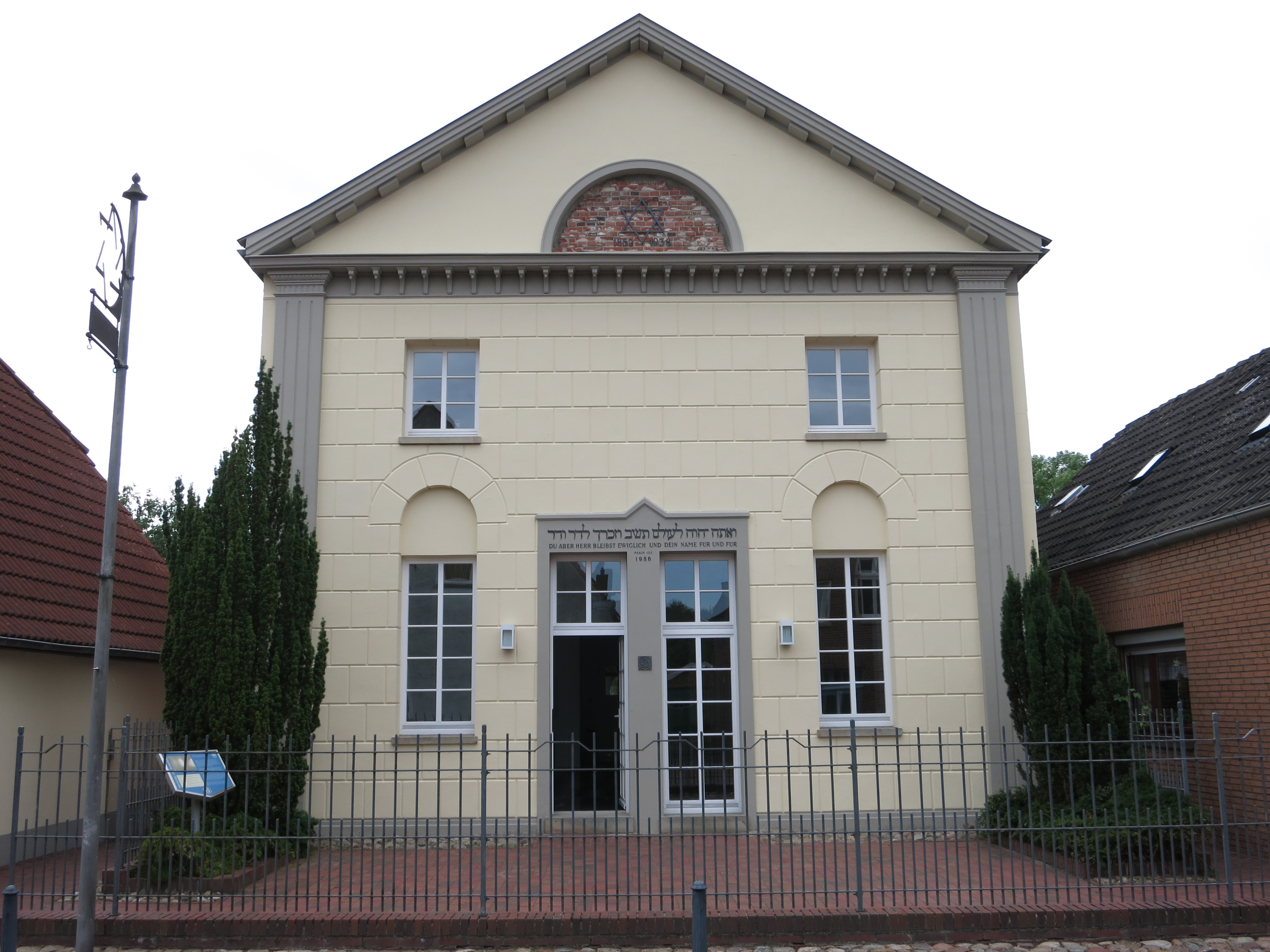
Exterior view of the synagogue

The former synagogue in Neustadtgödens is a largely well-preserved synagogue in East Frisia. The Jewish community of Neustadtgödens had it built in 1852. Until 1902, the building also served as a house of worship for the Jews of neighboring Wilhelmshaven. From the end of the 19th century onward, economic factors caused an increasing exodus of Jews (as well as non-Jewish residents) from Neustadtgödens. During the Nazi era, the community had shrunk so much that attendance had dwindled to the point that regular services could no longer be held. On March 15, 1936, the community gave up the synagogue with a farewell service. The building then passed into private ownership, and thus survived the November pogroms of 1938. Since July 10, 2015, the building has been reopened to the public as the Erinnerungsort ehemalige Synagoge in Neustadtgödens ("Memorial Site of the Former Synagogue in Neustadtgödens").

== History ==
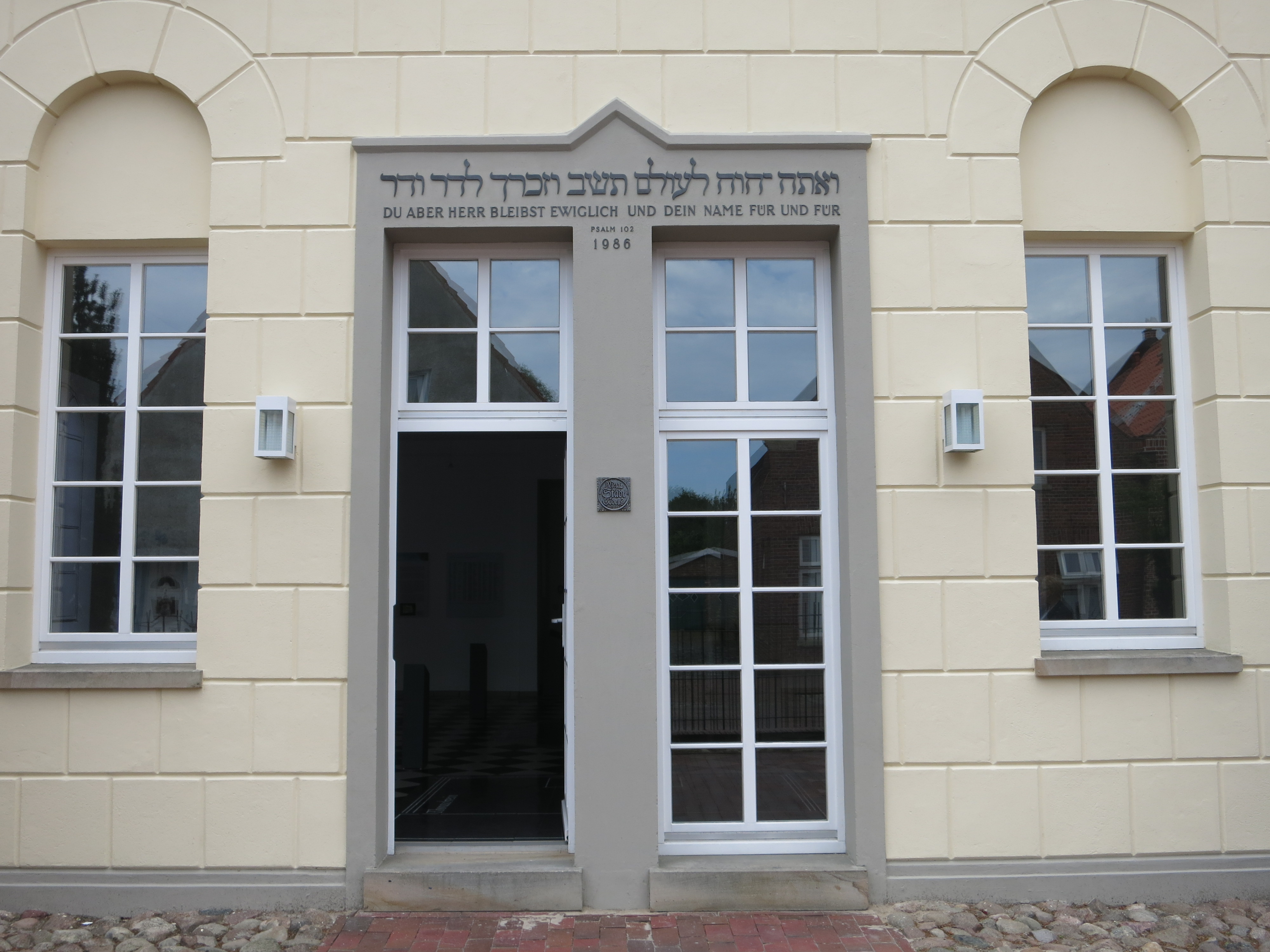
Today's main entrance

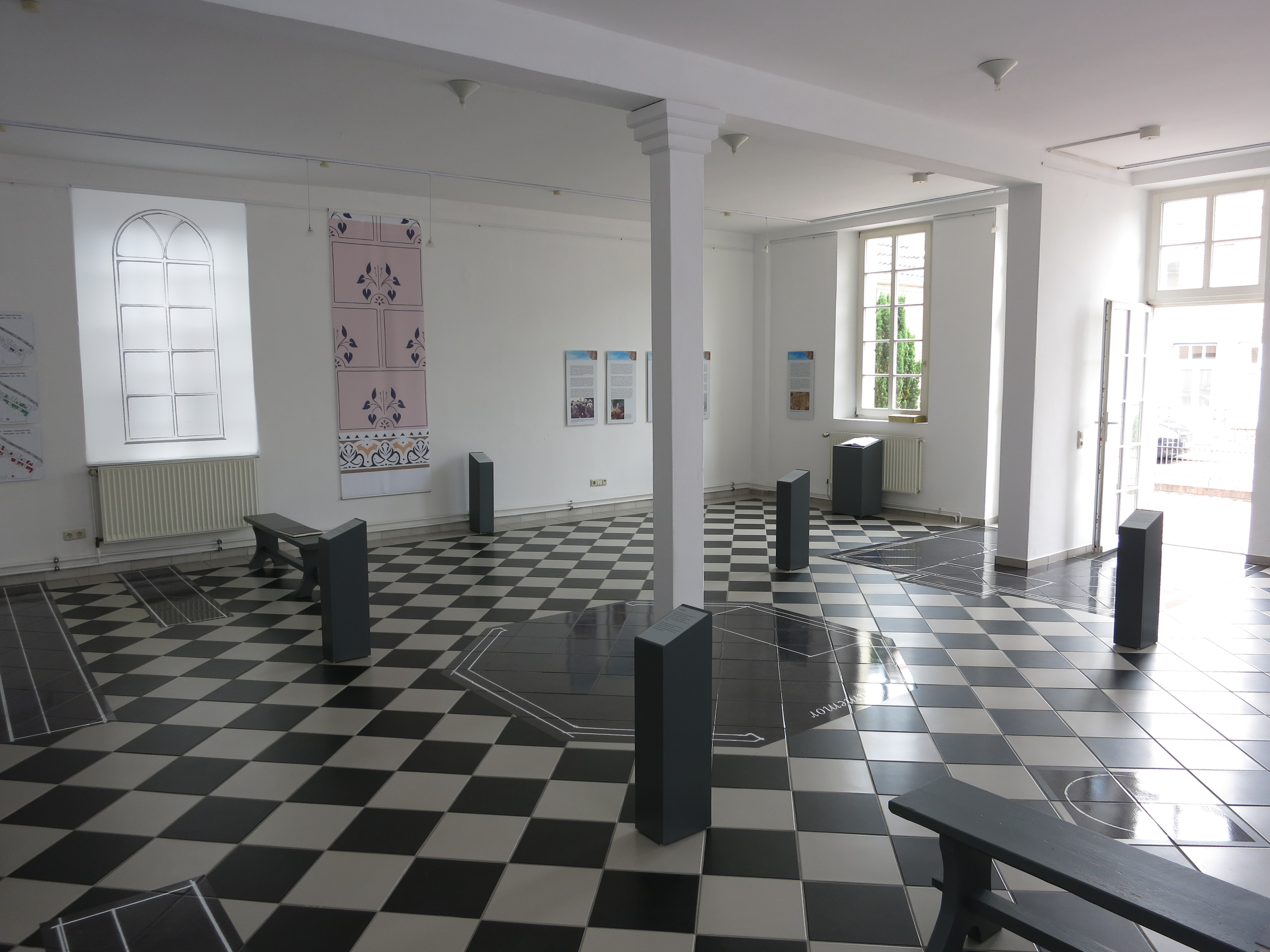
Interior after redesign as a memorial site

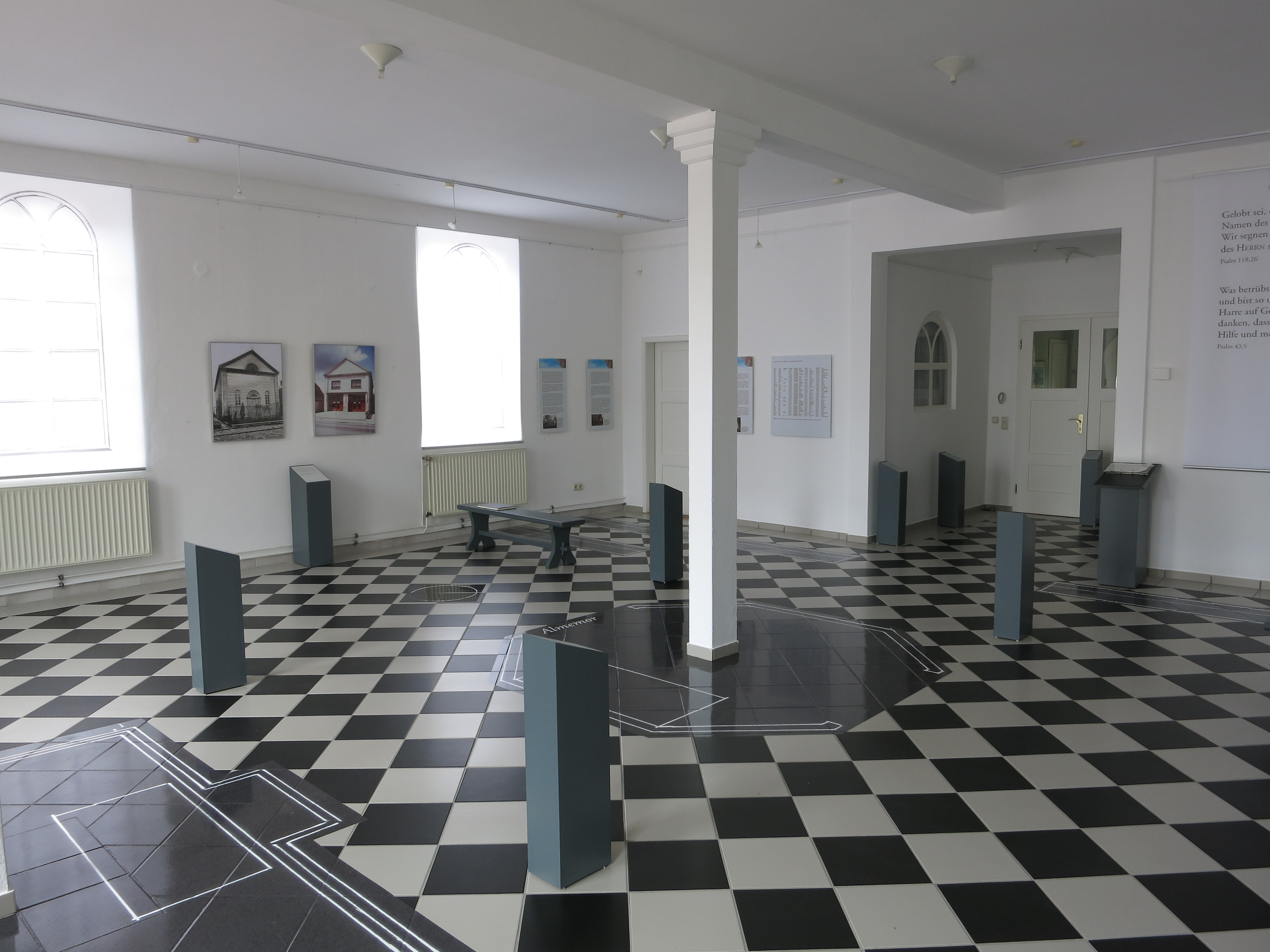
Interior after redesign as a memorial site

Count Burchard Phillip von Frydag, owner of the Herrlichkeit Gödens, granted the Jewish residents of Neustadtgödens the right to establish a synagogue and cemetery in 1708 via a letter of protection (Schutzbrief). From 1742, there was intermittently a local rabbi. A synagogue is first mentioned in 1752. Six years later, in 1758, records state that the house of worship stood "on manorial ground." A town map from 1830 shows the Israeliten Kirch ("Israelite Church") marked on it — presumably the old synagogue.

In 1852/53, the community demolished its old prayer house and built the synagogue that still stands today on the same site. This building also served as a house of worship for the Jews of nearby Wilhelmshaven until they built their own synagogue in 1902. From 1812 to 1922 there was also a dedicated school next to the synagogue.

After 1933, the community could barely use the synagogue in Neustadtgödens anymore, since it could no longer reach the required quorum of ten male worshippers for a minyan. By that time, the building was also showing signs of disrepair. It is possible that the alleged structural decay was merely a pretext used by the Nazi authorities to order the building's closure, since "the building and roof later proved to be sound." Nevertheless, the community gave up the synagogue on March 15, 1936, with a solemn service attended by regional rabbi Dr. Samuel E. Blum of Emden (1883–1951).

On June 27, 1938, the community sold the building for 2,500 RM to a carpenter from Wilhelmshaven, who, according to a newspaper report, intended to convert it into apartments. Another contemporary report states that the building housed a paint storage facility. This circumstance is thought to have at least protected the building during the November 1938 pogrom: fearing a major explosion in the densely built-up Kirchstraße, the Nazis refrained from burning it down. In this way, the building survived the Reichspogromnacht of November 9, 1938, without major damage. What became of its furnishings and ritual objects remains unclear to this day.

After 1945, the building was used as a residence. From around 1986, an intermediate ceiling was added for thermal reasons. In 1962, the then-municipality of Gödens acquired the building and had it substantially remodeled. In the process, the ornamental façade on the east side was largely destroyed by two truck garage doors cut into the wall. A new concrete intermediate ceiling made the upper floor usable as living space. The municipality subsequently used the building as a fire station and residence until 1986. Between 1986 and 1988, the municipality of Sande — which Gödens had been part of since July 1, 1972 — had the building restored using public funds. In total, the municipality invested around 270,000 DM. The interior was completely redesigned in the process. Thanks to the surviving building fabric, its exterior could largely be reconstructed to resemble its condition as of 1852/53, and it has since been regarded as "the only visible small-town synagogue in the entire northwestern German region," a valuable architectural and cultural monument.

For financial reasons, the municipality initially refrained from establishing a memorial site. From 1986 to 2001, the ground floor housed the exhibition space of the Galerie Schlieperder, used for art exhibitions, while the upper floor served as an apartment. In 2002, the municipality of Sande sold the former synagogue to a private individual from Westphalia. Via an entry in the land register, the municipality excluded any use of the protected building as a restaurant or amusement arcade, and agreed with the buyer that "the character of the house shall be preserved." The new owner planned to use the building as a residence and exhibition space for antique automobile and railway toys.

Since 2013, an information panel on the building has informed visitors about the synagogue's history. It remains in private ownership. Since July 2015, the ground floor has been accessible as part of guided tours.

== Exhibition ==
The synagogue remains privately owned. The owners use the upper floor as a vacation rental. Since July 2015, the ground floor has once again been open to the public as part of guided tours through Neustadtgödens. The new exhibition on the ground floor of the building is a cultural project run jointly by the Zweckverband Schlossmuseum Jever, the municipality of Sande, and the district of Friesland. The project's costs are borne by the Zweckverband. As part of the permanent exhibition, reconstruction drawings and historical exterior and interior photographs, along with other memorabilia, are displayed across an area of 80 square meters. Information panels, produced by the initiators in cooperation with the Jewish community of Oldenburg, explain the history of the building and of the local Jewish community from the end of the 17th century up to the deportation and murder of the last Jewish residents of Neustadtgödens in 1941/42. Visitors are meant to learn about the furnishings and layout of the synagogue and to be able to identify, even without a physical reconstruction, where the Torah shrine, the reading desk, and the women's gallery once stood. The project partners are planning cooperation with secondary schools in the district of Friesland and beyond. In addition, the synagogue is to be integrated into the cultural tourism concept of the municipality of Sande and the district of Friesland, and to take part in joint projects of the Oldenburg and East Frisian regional cultural associations.

== Architectural description ==
The Neustadtgödens synagogue was built in the style of a small-town synagogue, in the then newly emerging Neoclassical round-arch style (Rundbogenstil). The round-arch design was presumably based on a design by court architect Karl Friedrich Schinkel for small Protestant churches in diaspora communities. In front of the synagogue, near today's entrance, there is a forecourt roughly 5.50 meters wide, which was once separated from the street by an ornamental fence about 1.80 meters high.

The building is 15.30 meters long, 9.60 meters wide, and about ten meters high. It is topped by a shallow-pitched gabled roof, hipped at the rear and forming a triangular gable on the street-facing side. The façade on the street side is framed by two colossal pilasters. Originally, Hebrew inscriptions adorned the round arch and gable, along with a Star of David at the top of the gable. Today, only the Star of David remains. At the center of the street-facing façade, where the entrance is now located, there were originally two smaller columns joined by a round arch, marking the spot where the Torah shrine stood inside, facing east toward Jerusalem.

During its use as a synagogue, the building had two entrances: one for men on the west side, and one for women on the south side. Both led into an antechamber, from which worshippers proceeded either to the main hall (men) or up to the gallery (women). Adjacent to the antechamber was a storage room. Above the men's entrance is a still-preserved sandstone plaque bearing the verse from Psalm 118:26: "Blessed is he who comes in the name of the LORD! We bless you from the house of the LORD." The rear wall of the Torah shrine, by contrast, has been destroyed; the building's main entrance is now located where it once stood. During the 1986 renovation, the community had the inscription "But you, O LORD, remain forever, and your name throughout all generations" placed above the doorway.

The interior measures 11.40 by 8.8 meters and was originally richly painted. The women's gallery was located on the west side, and the bimah stood at the center of the prayer hall. The mikveh was located in a house about 300 meters away on Staustraße, but had already fallen out of use well before 1919.
