= Mazayjan Castle =

Castle in Fars province, Iran

Mazayjan castle
- قلعه مزایجان

General information
- Type: Castle
- Location: Zarrin Dasht County, Iran

Mazayjan castle (Persian: قلعه مزایجان) is a historical castle located in Zarrin Dasht County in Fars province.
