= Horhoreh =

Village in Hamadan province, Iran

Horhoreh Persian: هرهره
- Village
- Location within Iran
- Coordinates: 34°23′28″N 48°21′37″E
- Country: Iran
- Province: Hamadan
- County: Tuyserkan
- District: Qolqol Rud
- Rural District: Kamal Rud

Population (2016)
  - Total: 24
- Time zone: UTC+3:30 (IRST)

Horhoreh (Persian: هرهره) is a village in Kamal Rud Rural District of Qolqol Rud District in Tuyserkan County, Hamadan province, Iran.

== Demographics ==
=== Population ===
At the time of the 2006 National Census, the village's population was 40 in nine households. The following census in 2011 counted 24 people in six households. The 2016 census measured the population of the village as 24 people in seven households.
