= Chasht Khvoreh =

Village in Hamadan province, Iran

Chasht Khvoreh Persian: چاشت خوره
- Village
- Location within Iran
- Coordinates: 34°27′51″N 48°16′01″E
- Country: Iran
- Province: Hamadan
- County: Tuyserkan
- District: Qolqol Rud
- Rural District: Qolqol Rud

Population (2016)
  - Total: 681
- Time zone: UTC+3:30 (IRST)

Chasht Khvoreh (Persian: چاشت خوره) (Note: Also romanized as Chāsht Khowreh, Chāsht Khvoreh, Chāshtkhūreh, and Chāshtkhvoreh; also known as Chāshtkhoreh) is a village in Qolqol Rud Rural District of Qolqol Rud District in Tuyserkan County, Hamadan province, Iran.

== Demographics ==
=== Population ===
At the time of the 2006 National Census, the village's population was 737 in 170 households. The following census in 2011 counted 724 people in 209 households. The 2016 census measured the population of the village as 681 people in 212 households, the most populous in its rural district.
