= Zirab, Fars =

Village in Fars province, Iran

Zirab Persian: زيراب
- Village
- Location within Iran
- Coordinates: 28°28′49″N 54°26′01″E
- Country: Iran
- Province: Fars
- County: Zarrin Dasht
- District: Central
- Rural District: Zirab

Population (2016)
  - Total: 3,288
- Time zone: UTC+3:30 (IRST)

Zirab (Persian: زيراب) (Note: Also romanized as Zīr Āb and Zīrāb) is a village in, and the capital of, Zirab Rural District (Note: Formerly Hajjiabad Rural District) of the Central District of Zarrin Dasht County, Fars province, Iran.

== Demographics ==
=== Population ===
At the time of the 2006 National Census, the village's population was 3,018 in 634 households. The following census in 2011 counted 3,367 people in 838 households. The 2016 census measured the population of the village as 3,288 people in 986 households. It was the most populous village in its rural district.
