= Qaleh Now, Tuyserkan =

Village in Hamadan province, Iran

Qaleh Now Persian: قلعه نو
- Village
- Location within Iran
- Coordinates: 34°29′12″N 48°10′00″E
- Country: Iran
- Province: Hamadan
- County: Tuyserkan
- District: Qolqol Rud
- Rural District: Miyan Rud

Population (2016)
  - Total: 726
- Time zone: UTC+3:30 (IRST)

Qaleh Now (Persian: قلعه نو) (Note: Also romanized as Qal‘eh Now and Qal‘eh-ye Now; also known as Qal‘eh Nau, Qal‘eh-i-Nau, and Qal‘eh-ye Now Rūz) is a village in Miyan Rud Rural District of Qolqol Rud District in Tuyserkan County, Hamadan province, Iran.

== Demographics ==
=== Population ===
At the time of the 2006 National Census, the village's population was 1,131 in 213 households. The following census in 2011 counted 791 people in 216 households. The 2016 census measured the population of the village as 726 people in 227 households.
