= Lamiyan =

Village in Hamadan province, Iran

Lamiyan Persian: لاميان
- Village
- Location within Iran
- Coordinates: 34°27′41″N 48°11′34″E
- Country: Iran
- Province: Hamadan
- County: Tuyserkan
- District: Qolqol Rud
- Rural District: Miyan Rud

Population (2016)
  - Total: 1,876
- Time zone: UTC+3:30 (IRST)

Lamiyan (Persian: لاميان) (Note: Also romanized as Lāmeyān, Lāmīān, and Lamīyan; also known as Lāmanjān) is a village in Miyan Rud Rural District of Qolqol Rud District in Tuyserkan County, Hamadan province, Iran.

== Demographics ==
=== Population ===
At the time of the 2006 National Census, the village's population was 2,321 in 539 households. The following census in 2011 counted 2,067 people in 589 households. The 2016 census measured the population of the village as 1,876 people in 600 households, the most populous in its rural district.
