= Saziyan =

Village in Hamadan province, Iran

Saziyan Persian: سازيان
- Village
- Location within Iran
- Coordinates: 34°34′25″N 48°09′15″E
- Country: Iran
- Province: Hamadan
- County: Tuyserkan
- District: Qolqol Rud
- Rural District: Miyan Rud

Population (2016)
  - Total: 272
- Time zone: UTC+3:30 (IRST)

Saziyan (Persian: سازيان) (Note: Also romanized as Sāzīān and Sāzīyān) is a village in Miyan Rud Rural District of Qolqol Rud District in Tuyserkan County, Hamadan province, Iran.

== Demographics ==
=== Population ===
At the time of the 2006 National Census, the village's population was 294 in 68 households. The following census in 2011 counted 289 people in 73 households. The 2016 census measured the population of the village as 272 people in 77 households.
