= Hajji Tu =

Village in Hamadan province, Iran

Hajji Tu Persian: حاجي تو
- Village
- Location within Iran
- Coordinates: 34°27′10″N 48°21′19″E
- Country: Iran
- Province: Hamadan
- County: Tuyserkan
- District: Qolqol Rud
- Rural District: Qolqol Rud

Population (2016)
  - Total: 324
- Time zone: UTC+3:30 (IRST)

Hajji Tu (Persian: حاجي تو) (Note: Also romanized as Haji Too, Ḩājītū, and Ḩājjī Tū) is a village in Qolqol Rud Rural District of Qolqol Rud District in Tuyserkan County, Hamadan province, Iran.

== Demographics ==
=== Population ===
At the time of the 2006 National Census, the village's population was 523 in 146 households. The following census in 2011 counted 468 people in 151 households. The 2016 census measured the population of the village as 324 people in 111 households.
