= Barfiyan, Hamadan =

Barfiyan برفيان
- Village
- Location within Iran
- Coordinates: 34°25′29″N 48°15′52″E
- Country: Iran
- Province: Hamadan
- County: Tuyserkan
- Bakhsh: Qolqol Rud
- Rural District: Qolqol Rud

Population (2006)
  - Total: 177
- Time zone: UTC+3:30 (IRST)
  - Summer (DST): UTC+4:30 (IRDT)

Barfiyan (Persian: برفيان, also Romanized as Barfīyān and Barfīān; also known as Bartiān) is a village in Qolqol Rud Rural District, Qolqol Rud District, Tuyserkan County, Hamadan Province, Iran. At the 2006 census, its population was 177, in 45 families.
