= Gol-e Zard, Hamadan =

Village in Hamadan province, Iran

Gol-e Zard Persian: گل زرد
- Village
- Location within Iran
- Coordinates: 34°10′09″N 48°22′35″E
- Country: Iran
- Province: Hamadan
- County: Tuyserkan
- District: Qolqol Rud
- Rural District: Kamal Rud

Population (2016)
  - Total: 24
- Time zone: UTC+3:30 (IRST)

Gol-e Zard (Persian: گل زرد) (Note: Also romanized as Gol Zard; also known as Sang-e Sefīd) is a village in Kamal Rud Rural District of Qolqol Rud District in Tuyserkan County, Hamadan province, Iran.

== Demographics ==
=== Population ===
At the time of the 2006 National Census, the village's population was 103 in 29 households. The following census in 2011 counted 29 people in nine households. The 2016 census measured the population of the village as 24 people in eight households.
