= Tajabad-e Sofla =

Tajabad-e Sofla or Taj Abad Sofla (Persian: تاج ابادسفلي), also known as Tajabad-e Pain, may refer to:

- Tajabad-e Sofla, Fars
- Tajabad-e Sofla, Hamadan
