= Minabad, Hamadan =

Village in Hamadan province, Iran

Minabad Persian: مين اباد
- Village
- Location within Iran
- Coordinates: 34°36′51″N 48°08′14″E
- Country: Iran
- Province: Hamadan
- County: Tuyserkan
- District: Qolqol Rud
- Rural District: Miyan Rud

Population (2016)
  - Total: 264
- Time zone: UTC+3:30 (IRST)

Minabad (Persian: مين اباد) (Note: Also romanized as Mīnābād) is a village in Miyan Rud Rural District of Qolqol Rud District in Tuyserkan County, Hamadan province, Iran.

== Demographics ==
=== Population ===
At the time of the 2006 National Census, the village's population was 294 in 56 households. The following census in 2011 counted 279 people in 72 households. The 2016 census measured the population of the village as 264 people in 76 households.
