= Douban (disambiguation) =

Douban is a Chinese social networking website.

Douban may also refer to:

- Doubanjiang, spicy, salty paste made from fermented broad beans and soybeans

== See also ==
- Dobiran, also known as Dowban, a city in Iran
- Mont Dauban, a peak on Silhouette Island in the Seychelles
- Charles-Armel Doubane (born 1966), a Central African politician and diplomat
