= Gelkuyeh =

Village in Fars province, Iran

Gelkuyeh Persian: گلكويه
- Village
- Location within Iran
- Coordinates: 28°10′33″N 54°26′42″E
- Country: Iran
- Province: Fars
- County: Zarrin Dasht
- District: Izadkhast
- Rural District: Izadkhast-e Sharqi

Population (2016)
  - Total: 1,324
- Time zone: UTC+3:30 (IRST)

Gelkuyeh (Persian: گلكويه) (Note: Also romanized as Gelkūyeh; also known as Gelkān and Golkān) is a village in, and the capital of, Izadkhast-e Sharqi Rural District of Izadkhast District, Zarrin Dasht County, Fars province, Iran.

== Demographics ==
=== Population ===
At the time of the 2006 National Census, the village's population was 974 in 242 households. The following census in 2011 counted 1,277 people in 320 households. The 2016 census measured the population of the village as 1,324 people in 378 households.
