= Yaqubabad, Hamadan =

Village in Hamadan province, Iran

Yaqubabad Persian: يعقوب اباد
- Village
- Location within Iran
- Coordinates: 34°26′13″N 48°23′15″E
- Country: Iran
- Province: Hamadan
- County: Tuyserkan
- District: Qolqol Rud
- Rural District: Kamal Rud

Population (2016)
  - Total: 169
- Time zone: UTC+3:30 (IRST)

Yaqubabad (Persian: يعقوب اباد) (Note: Also romanized as Ya‘qūbābād; formerly known as Ya‘qūb Shāh (یعقوب شاه); also known as ‘Āshūrī) is a village in Kamal Rud Rural District of Qolqol Rud District in Tuyserkan County, Hamadan province, Iran.

== Demographics ==
=== Population ===
At the time of the 2006 National Census, the village's population was 152 in 49 households. The following census in 2011 counted 184 people in 53 households. The 2016 census measured the population of the village as 169 people in 58 households.
