= Karimabad, Tuyserkan =

Village in Hamadan province, Iran

Karimabad Persian: كريم اباد
- Village
- Location within Iran
- Coordinates: 34°31′27″N 48°17′19″E
- Country: Iran
- Province: Hamadan
- County: Tuyserkan
- District: Qolqol Rud
- Rural District: Qolqol Rud

Population (2016)
  - Total: 438
- Time zone: UTC+3:30 (IRST)

Karimabad (Persian: كريم اباد) (Note: Also romanized as Karīmābād) is a village in Qolqol Rud Rural District of Qolqol Rud District in Tuyserkan County, Hamadan province, Iran.

== Demographics ==
=== Population ===
At the time of the 2006 National Census, the village's population was 431 in 93 households. The following census in 2011 counted 445 people in 119 households. The 2016 census measured the population of the village as 438 people in 137 households.
