= Deh-e Mian =

Deh Miyan or Deh Miyan or Deh Miyan or Deh Mian or Dehmiyan or Deh Miyan (Persian: ده ميان) may refer to various places in Iran:

- Deh Miyan, Lamerd, Fars Province
- Deh Miyan, Larestan, Fars Province
- Deh-e Mian, Baft, Kerman Province
- Deh Mian, Manujan, Kerman Province
- Deh Mian, Mazandaran
- Deh-e Mian, Razavi Khorasan

== See also ==
- Mian Deh (disambiguation)
