= Qoli Laleh =

Qoli Laleh (Persian: قلي لاله), also rendered as Gol Laleh and Quli Laleh, may refer to:

- Qoli Laleh-ye Olya
- Qoli Laleh-ye Sofla
