= Day Break (2005 film) =

- Persian: Dam-e sobh
- Directed by: Hamid Rahmanian
- Written by: Mehran Kashani; Hamid Rahmanian
- Produced by: Vahid Nikkhah-Azad; Hamid Rahmanian
- Starring: Hossein Yari; Zabi Afshar; Maryam Amirjallali; Hoda Nasseh; Atash Taghipour
- Cinematography: Bayram Fazli
- Edited by: Ebrahim Saeedi
- Music by: David Bergeaud
- Release date: 2005
- Running time: 85 minutes
- Country: Iran
- Language: Persian

Day Break (Persian: دم صبح, romanized: Dam-e Sobh) is a 2005 independent film from Iranian director Hamid Rahmanian. It depicts a man on death row whose execution is repeatedly delayed because the family of the victim does not appear for his execution (which is necessary for an execution to take place under Iranian law). Some parts of the film are filmed like a documentary (docudrama), with characters addressing the camera crew or looking into the camera, but most of the scenes, including frequent flashbacks, are filmed in the traditional style of a fictional film.

The film sets in with the written statement that "This film is based on true events"; later in the introduction of the film, it is added that it is "based on a story by Hamid Rahmanian". The cover of the DVD release by Film Movement describes the film as "based on a compilation of true stories" and adds that it was "shot inside Tehran's century-old prison".

With few exceptions (e.g., Şafak in Turkey), the film has been internationally screened under the title Day Break. In the United States, the film is not rated, but according to the cover of its DVD release is "not recommended for ages under 17 without parental permission".

== Plot ==
Mansour Ziaee (Hossein Yari) is a prison inmate in Iran's capital Tehran, who is awaiting his execution for murder. The film outlines his previous story in brief flashbacks: He is from the small village Zir Ab (probably a fictitious village since the four existing Iranian places of that name are not in the north of Tehran), where his family was farming sheep. Hoping for a better future, he convinced his parents and his wife to move to Tehran, but once there, faced difficulties keeping the job he had counted on. Although the crime he committed and its immediate antecedents are never directly shown, it appears that he killed someone, probably his employer, with a brick stone on a busy street in broad daylight. He is apprehended on the spot and later sentenced to death.

Under the Islamic law used in Iran, the family of the victim has the power to pardon the perpetrator's life, and they have to be present at the execution. Ziaee's execution had to be delayed twice already because the family failed to come, when the film sets in on the morning of the third date fixed for his execution. The camera follows him through the procedures before an execution can take place, but ultimately, the victim's family again does not show up, and the execution is postponed for another 40 days.

While his fellow prison inmates celebrate the cancellation, the stressful uncertainty between life and death takes its toll, and Ziaee withdraws more and more from the world around him. He does not want to see his family anymore, who has moved back to Zir Ab because they felt lonely in Tehran, he attempts suicide and provokes to be sent to solitary confinement. He finally finds back to some joy of life when his wife gives birth to their first child. Soon afterwards, however, his execution is appointed for the fourth time. After a haunting dream of finally being hanged, the film leaves Ziaee as he walks off to the room where he will either meet the victim's family or be stood up again.

== Reception ==
The International Herald Tribune described the film as "a hard-hitting, thought provoking drama that gives a new dimension to a hot topic: the death sentence". Variety wrote that it "works like a ticking time bomb".

According to the Encyclopædia Britannica Online Britannica Book of the Year 2006, "Hamid Ramanian's Dame sobh (“Daybreak”) was a harrowing study of a murderer awaiting the death penalty, which is by Islamic law the personal responsibility of the injured family".

== Awards ==
The film was the winner of the Annonay International Film Festival (Annonay, France) and the Fajr Film Festival (Tehran). It was in the official selection of the Tribeca Film Festival (New York City) and the Toronto International Film Festival.
