= Shahr-e Pir =

City in Fars province, Iran

Shahr-e Pir Persian: شهرپير
- City
- Location within Iran
- Coordinates: 28°18′44″N 54°19′58″E
- Country: Iran
- Province: Fars
- County: Zarrin Dasht
- District: Izadkhast

Population (2016)
  - Total: 8,927
- Time zone: UTC+3:30 (IRST)

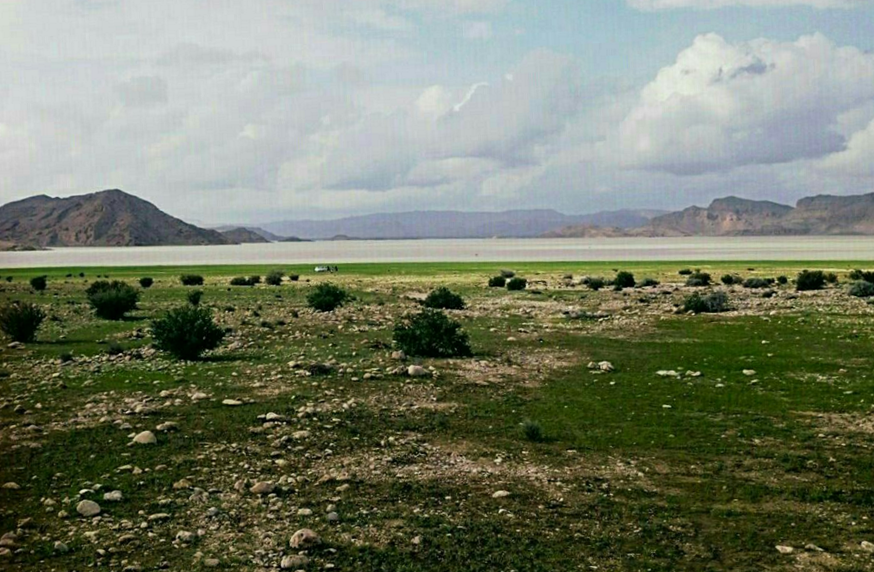
Shahr-e pir Lake in Zarrin Dasht, Fars

Shahr-e Pir (Persian: شهرپير) (Note: Also romanized as Shahr Pīr and Shahr-e Pīr) is a city in, and the capital of, Izadkhast District of Zarrin Dasht County, Fars province, Iran. It also serves as the administrative center for Izadkhast-e Gharbi Rural District. (Note: Formerly Izadkhast Rural District)

== Demographics ==
=== Population ===
At the time of the 2006 National Census, the city's population was 7,161 in 1,549 households. The following census in 2011 counted 8,100 people in 2,031 households. The 2016 census measured the population of the city as 8,927 people in 2,469 households.
