= Kanjvaran-e Sofla =

Village in Hamadan province, Iran

Kanjvaran-e Sofla Persian: كنجوران سفلي
- Village
- Location within Iran
- Coordinates: 34°33′09″N 48°07′44″E
- Country: Iran
- Province: Hamadan
- County: Tuyserkan
- District: Qolqol Rud
- Rural District: Miyan Rud

Population (2016)
  - Total: 414
- Time zone: UTC+3:30 (IRST)

Kanjvaran-e Sofla (Persian: كنجوران سفلي) (Note: Also romanized as Kanjvarān-e Soflá; also known as Ganjūrān, Ganjvarān, Ganjvarān-e Soflá, and Kanjūrān) is a village in Miyan Rud Rural District of Qolqol Rud District in Tuyserkan County, Hamadan province, Iran.

== Demographics ==
=== Population ===
At the time of the 2006 National Census, the village's population was 523 in 112 households. The following census in 2011 counted 517 people in 149 households. The 2016 census measured the population of the village as 414 people in 137 households.
