= Kamal Rud Rural District =

Rural district in Hamadan province, Iran

Kamal Rud Rural District Persian: دهستان كمال رود
- Rural District
- Location within Iran
- Coordinates: 34°24′N 48°25′E
- Country: Iran
- Province: Hamadan
- County: Tuyserkan
- District: Qolqol Rud
- Established: 1987
- Capital: Mian Deh

Population (2016)
  - Total: 2,330
- Time zone: UTC+3:30 (IRST)

Kamal Rud Rural District (Persian: دهستان كمال رود) is in Qolqol Rud District of Tuyserkan County, Hamadan province, Iran. Its capital is the village of Mian Deh.

== Demographics ==
=== Population ===
At the time of the 2006 National Census, the rural district's population was 2,733 in 696 households. There were 2,688 inhabitants in 749 households at the following census of 2011. The 2016 census measured the population of the rural district as 2,330 in 715 households. The most populous of its 11 villages was Mian Deh, with 965 people.

=== Other villages in the rural district ===
- Abu Darda
- Ahmadabad
- Baba Kamal
- Darvaz
- Gol-e Zard
- Hamilabad
- Horhoreh
- Yaqubabad
