= Hajjiabad, Fars =

City in Fars province, Iran

Hajjiabad Persian: حاجي آباد
- City
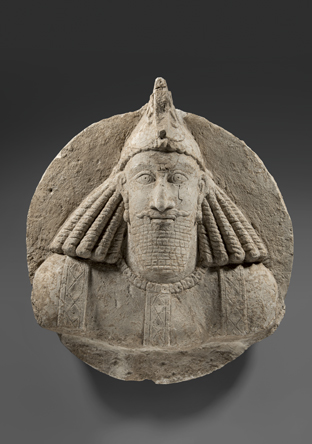

- Location within Iran
- Coordinates: 28°21′29″N 54°25′16″E
- Country: Iran
- Province: Fars
- County: Zarrin Dasht
- District: Central

Population (2016)
  - Total: 21,675
- Time zone: UTC+3:30 (IRST)

Hajjiabad (Persian: حاجي آباد) (Note: Also romanized as Ḩājīābād and Hājjīābād) is a city in the Central District of Zarrin Dasht County, Fars province, Iran, serving as capital of both the county and the district.

== Demographics ==
=== Population ===
At the time of the 2006 National Census, the city's population was 18,346 in 4,195 households. The following census in 2011 counted 20,501 people in 5,121 households. The 2016 census measured the population of the city as 21,675 people in 6,061 households.
