= Farasfaj =

City in Hamadan province, Iran

Farasfaj Persian: فرسفج
- City
- Location within Iran
- Coordinates: 34°29′11″N 48°17′09″E
- Country: Iran
- Province: Hamadan
- County: Tuyserkan
- District: Qolqol Rud
- Established as a city: 2000

Population (2016)
  - Total: 1,526
- Time zone: UTC+3:30 (IRST)

Farasfaj (Persian: فرسفج) (Note: Also romanized as Faresfaj and Farsafaj; also known as Farsfīj) is a city in, and the capital of, Qolqol Rud District in Tuyserkan County, Hamadan province, Iran. It also serves as the administrative center for Qolqol Rud Rural District. The village of Farasfaj was converted to a city in 2000.

== Demographics ==
=== Population ===
At the time of the 2006 National Census, the city's population was 1,608 in 443 households. The following census in 2011 counted 1,721 people in 486 households. The 2016 census measured the population of the city as 1,526 people in 457 households.
