= Mian Deh, Hamadan =

Village in Hamadan province, Iran

Mian Deh Persian: ميانده
- Village
- Location within Iran
- Coordinates: 34°23′51″N 48°25′26″E
- Country: Iran
- Province: Hamadan
- County: Tuyserkan
- District: Qolqol Rud
- Rural District: Kamal Rud

Population (2016)
  - Total: 965
- Time zone: UTC+3:30 (IRST)

Mian Deh (Persian: ميانده) (Note: Also romanized as Meyān Deh, Mīān Deh, and Mīyāndeh) is a village in, and the capital of, Kamal Rud Rural District in Qolqol Rud District of Tuyserkan County, Hamadan province, Iran.

== Demographics ==
=== Population ===
At the time of the 2006 National Census, the village's population was 866 in 215 households. The following census in 2011 counted 1,038 people in 279 households. The 2016 census measured the population of the village as 965 people in 273 households, the most populous in its rural district.
