= Shanabad =

Village in Hamadan province, Iran

Shanabad Persian: شان اباد
- Village
- Location within Iran
- Coordinates: 34°36′32″N 48°06′15″E
- Country: Iran
- Province: Hamadan
- County: Tuyserkan
- District: Qolqol Rud
- Rural District: Miyan Rud

Population (2016)
  - Total: 733
- Time zone: UTC+3:30 (IRST)

Shanabad (Persian: شان اباد) (Note: Also romanized as Shānābād; formerly known as Shahnabad (شهن‌آباد); also known as Shahīnābād) is a village in Miyan Rud Rural District of Qolqol Rud District in Tuyserkan County, Hamadan province, Iran.

== Demographics ==
=== Population ===
At the time of the 2006 National Census, the village's population was 1,020 in 224 households. The following census in 2011 counted 876 people in 269 households. The 2016 census measured the population of the village as 733 people in 247 households.
