= Darvaz, Hamadan =

Village in Hamadan province, Iran

Darvaz Persian: درواز
- Village
- Location within Iran
- Coordinates: 34°26′25″N 48°26′20″E
- Country: Iran
- Province: Hamadan
- County: Tuyserkan
- District: Qolqol Rud
- Rural District: Kamal Rud

Population (2016)
  - Total: 50
- Time zone: UTC+3:30 (IRST)

Darvaz (Persian: درواز) (Note: Also romanized as Darvāz; also known as Darvāzeh) is a village in Kamal Rud Rural District of Qolqol Rud District in Tuyserkan County, Hamadan province, Iran.

== Demographics ==
=== Population ===
At the time of the 2006 National Census, the village's population was 101 in 29 households. The following census in 2011 counted 84 people in 25 households. The 2016 census measured the population of the village as 50 people in 17 households.
