= Menjan =

Village in Hamadan province, Iran

Menjan Persian: منجان
- Village
- Location within Iran
- Coordinates: 34°26′53″N 48°14′08″E
- Country: Iran
- Province: Hamadan
- County: Tuyserkan
- District: Qolqol Rud
- Rural District: Qolqol Rud

Population (2016)
  - Total: 429
- Time zone: UTC+3:30 (IRST)

Menjan (Persian: منجان) (Note: Also romanized as Manjan and Menjān; also known as Mīkhān and Minjān) is a village in Qolqol Rud Rural District of Qolqol Rud District in Tuyserkan County, Hamadan province, Iran.

== Demographics ==
=== Population ===
At the time of the 2006 National Census, the village's population was 581 in 157 households. The following census in 2011 counted 571 people in 161 households. The 2016 census measured the population of the village as 429 people in 124 households.
