= Kanjvaran-e Olya =

Village in Hamadan province, Iran

Kanjvaran-e Olya Persian: كنجوران عليا
- Village
- Location within Iran
- Coordinates: 34°33′27″N 48°12′12″E
- Country: Iran
- Province: Hamadan
- County: Tuyserkan
- District: Qolqol Rud
- Rural District: Miyan Rud

Population (2016)
  - Total: 203
- Time zone: UTC+3:30 (IRST)

Kanjvaran-e Olya (Persian: كنجوران عليا) (Note: Also romanized as Kanjvarān-e ‘Olyā; also known as Ganjvarān-e ‘Olyā, Gheyb Qoli, Gheyb Qoli Bala, and Gheyb Qolī-ye Bālā) is a village in Miyan Rud Rural District of Qolqol Rud District in Tuyserkan County, Hamadan province, Iran.

== Demographics ==
=== Population ===
At the time of the 2006 National Census, the village's population was 195 in 46 households. The following census in 2011 counted 198 people in 56 households. The 2016 census measured the population of the village as 203 people in 59 households.
