= Kanjvaran-e Vosta =

Village in Hamadan province, Iran

Kanjvaran-e Vosta Persian: كنجوران وسطي
- Village
- Location within Iran
- Coordinates: 34°33′07″N 48°10′48″E
- Country: Iran
- Province: Hamadan
- County: Tuyserkan
- District: Qolqol Rud
- Rural District: Miyan Rud

Population (2016)
  - Total: 55
- Time zone: UTC+3:30 (IRST)

Kanjvaran-e Vosta (Persian: كنجوران وسطي) (Note: Also romanized as Kanjvarān-e Vosţá; also known as Ganjvarān-e Vosţá, Gheyb Qolī, Gheyb Qolī Pā’īn, and Gheyb Qolī-ye Pā’īn) is a village in Miyan Rud Rural District of Qolqol Rud District in Tuyserkan County, Hamadan province, Iran.

== Demographics ==
=== Population ===
At the time of the 2006 National Census, the village's population was 71 in 15 households. The following census in 2011 counted 56 people in 14 households. The 2016 census measured the population of the village as 55 people in 15 households.
