= Golkan-e Shahid Medani =

Golkan-e Shahid Medani گل كن شهيدمدني
- Village
- Location within Iran
- Coordinates: 28°22′04″N 61°12′21″E
- Country: Iran
- Province: Sistan and Baluchestan
- County: Khash
- Bakhsh: Central
- Rural District: Sangan

Population (2006)
  - Total: 40
- Time zone: UTC+3:30 (IRST)
  - Summer (DST): UTC+4:30 (IRDT)

Golkan-e Shahid Medani (Persian: گل كن شهيدمدني, also Romanized as Golkān-e Shahīd Medanī; also known as Golkān) is a village in Sangan Rural District, in the Central District of Khash County, Sistan and Baluchestan Province, Iran. At the 2006 census, its population was 40, in 7 families.
