= Miandeh, Rudsar =

Miandeh ميانده
- Village
- Location within Iran
- Coordinates: 36°57′50″N 50°33′44″E
- Country: Iran
- Province: Gilan
- County: Rudsar
- Bakhsh: Chaboksar
- Rural District: Owshiyan

Population (2006)
  - Total: 76
- Time zone: UTC+3:30 (IRST)
  - Summer (DST): UTC+4:30 (IRDT)

Miandeh (Persian: ميانده, also Romanized as Mīāndeh and Meyāndeh) is a village in Owshiyan Rural District, Chaboksar District, Rudsar County, Gilan Province, Iran. At the 2006 census, its population was 76, in 19 families.
