= Khalilabad, Pakistan =

Khalilabad
- Location within Pakistan
- Coordinates: 25.9°N 69.36°E
- Country: Pakistan
- Province: Sindh
- Elevation: 9 m (30 ft)
- Time zone: UTC+5 (PST)

Khalilabad is a town in the Sindh province of Pakistan. It is located at 25°9'40N 69°36'30E with an altitude of 9 metres (32 feet).
