= Hamid Rahmanian =

Iranian-American filmmaker, graphic designer and performer

- حمید رحمانیان
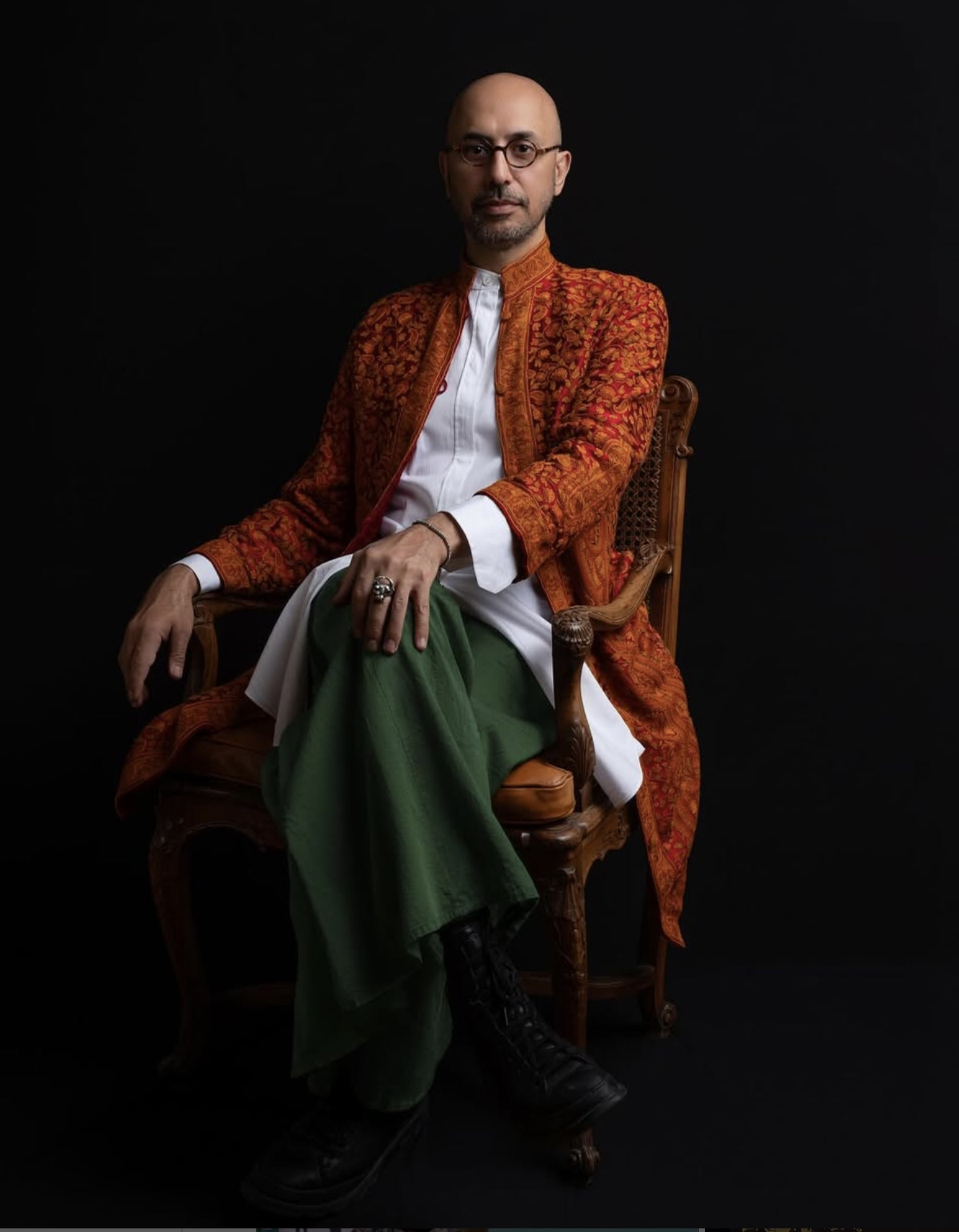
- Caption Hamid Rahmanian in France
- Born: 1968 (age 57–58); Iran
- Education: University of Tehran; Pratt Institute
- Occupations: Visual artist, illustrator, performer
- Known for: Cinema, graphic art, shadow theater, puppets
- Spouse: Melissa Hibbard
- Children: 1

Hamid Rahmanian (Persian: حمید رحمانیان; born 1968) is an Iranian-born American multi-disciplinary artist who has worked extensively in cinema, illustration, and shadow theater.

He has been awarded a 2014 John Simon Guggenheim Fellow Award and 2022 United Artist fellowship award.

Since the late 1980s, he has produced works that draw on traditional Iranian visual forms while incorporating contemporary techniques such as digital design and multimedia staging. Since 2008, a central focus of Rahmanian’s work has been the reinterpretation of the Shahnameh. His projects aim to reintroduce the text to contemporary and international audiences through visual storytelling and design. His projects include documentary and narrative films, large-scale shadow plays, and illustrated and pop-up adaptations of the Shahnameh. Rahmanian lives and works in New York City.

== Early life and education ==
He was educated in Tehran, Iran where he gained his Bachelor of fine arts in graphic design from University of Tehran. He has worked as a graphic designer since 1987. In 1992, he received the highest honor and was awarded recognition as the youngest professional designer in Iran. Rahmanian has continued to work as a graphic designer in the US and has been commissioned to do work for cultural organizations and commercial companies including the United Nations, GQ magazine, the Lincoln Center, the Tribeca Film Institute, Pacifica Radio/Democracy Now! and the Eurasia Foundation.

Rahmanian moved to the United States and earned a master of fine arts in computer animation in 1994 from Pratt Institute. His thesis animation, The Seventh Day (1996) received the first place College Award from the Academy of Television Arts and Sciences, was nominated for a student academy award, and competed at Annecy International Animation Festival.

In 1996, he was the youngest recipient of the National Interest Waiver from the U.S. for his outstanding work as an artist.

== Career ==
FILMS

After completing his studies, he was hired by Disney Feature Animation Company as a Look Development Artist where he worked on Tarzan, The Emperor's New Groove, and Dinosaur. In 1998, Rahmanian left Disney and established his own production company, Fictionville Studio. His first 35 mm short film An I Within (1999), received Kodak's Best Cinematography Award, Best American Short from the Los Angeles International Short Film Festival, and Special Achievement Award from the USA Film Festival. He went on to make three documentaries. Breaking Bread (2000) and Sir Alfred Of Charles De Gaulle Airport (2001) were well received by the media and worldwide audiences. Shahrbanoo (2002) first premiered on PBS station WNET where it received among the highest ratings for an independently produced documentary and has been broadcast on networks around the globe. His first feature length fiction film Dame sobh (2005) (Persian: دم صبح, Dam-e Sobh, English title: Day Break) premiered at the Toronto International Film Festival, went on to screen at festivals and theaters all over the world, including the Venice Film Festival and Tribeca Film Festival and won Special Jury Prize at the International Film Festival of Prime in 2006. Variety called it, "An impressive debut feature that works like a ticking time bomb". The Glass House (2008 film) a feature-length documentary premiered at the Sundance Film Festival and International Documentary Festival in Amsterdam and was the winner of the Organization for Security and Cooperation in Europe's (OSCE) Human Rights Award, among other awards. His films have been televised on international networks, including PBS, Sundance Channel, IFC, Channel 4, BBC, DR2, and Al Jazeera.

WORKS ON SHAHNAMEH

In 2013, Rahmanian illustrated and commissioned a new translation, translated by Dr. Ahmad Sadri, and adaptation of the tenth-century Persian epic poem Shahnameh by Ferdowsi, entitled Shahnameh: The Epic Of The Persian Kings. This best-selling, 600 page art book, which according to the Wall Street Journal, is a "Masterpiece," published by The Quantuck Lane Press and distributed by W. W. Norton & Company. The limited-edition version of the book was exhibited at the Library of Congress in 2014 as part of their "1000 years of the Persian Book" exhibition.

Rahmanian has developed multimedia performances based on the Shahnameh using shadow puppetry, animation, and digital projection.

Rahmanian began experimenting with shadow theater techniques in 2014. He created a 20-minute shadow play with overhead projectors titled Zahhak: The Legend of the Serpent King, based on a fable from the Shahnameh. It premiered at the Asia Society in New York City and later on the Brooklyn Academy of Music and the Freer Gallery of Art and the Arthur M. Sackler Gallery of the Smithsonian Institution.

In 2016, Rahmanian created, designed, and directed the stage production of Feathers of Fire, an adaption of the Persian love story of Zaul and Rudabeh from the Shahnameh. This "jaw-dropping" live animation-like shadow play incorporated shadow casters, puppets, digitally projected animation and music to create a "feast for the senses" according to Puppetry International Magazine. Le Figaro called it "astonishing and magical" and NYC Theater Review exclaimed that it was a "masterpiece". The play premiered at the Brooklyn Academy of Music. It played at the Metropolitan Museum of Art and toured around the world between 2016 and 2018. The work was performed 112 times to over 100,000 audiences worldwide.

In 2017, he released an immersive audiobook version of Shahnameh: The Epic of the Persian Kings with an introduction by Frances Ford Coppola. In 2018, Rahmanian released the pop-up book Zahhak: The Legend of the Serpent King through Fantagraphics Books. The book which Le Monde called "simply breathtaking" won the 2018 Meggendorfer Prize for the Best Pop Up Book. The French publication La Croix called it "magnificent" and the New York Journal of Books said it was a "book that demands respect." The book was published in French and English.

In 2019, Rahmanian collaborated with Keyhan Kalhor and the Silk Road Ensemble on their project, Heroes Take Their Stand, where he created a 23-minute animation about the life of the Persian hero Siavosh from Shahnameh.

In 2022, Rahmanian created and designed a pop-up book, The Seven Trials of Rostam, featuring paper engineering by Simon Arizpe and text by Melissa Hibbard. The book retells the Persian myth of Rostam's seven trials, in which the hero and his horse Rakhsh journey through the land of Mazandaran, battling wild animals, demons, and witches to rescue King Kay Kavous from the White Demon. It was released as a follow-up to Fictionville Studio's earlier pop-up book, Zahhak the Legend of the Serpent King, with the English-language edition limited to a run of 4,500 copies. The book has also been published in French and Italian editions, and received praise from outlets including the New York Times, Radio France, Télérama, Ouest France, Le Figaro, and Le Monde.

In 2023, Hamid created and directed Song of the North, a multimedia shadow theater based on episodes from the Shahnameh. The work combines 483 hand-crafted shadow puppets, 208 digital animations, and large-scale projection to present stories from the Persian epic in a contemporary theatrical format. Expanding on techniques developed in Rahmanian’s earlier productions, the performance incorporates hundreds of articulated figures and layered visual compositions to depict mythological and historical narratives. The production premiered at Quay Branly Museum in Paris in January of 2022 and later in February at the Harvey Theater at Brooklyn Academy of Music in New York. The production has been presented at cultural venues and festivals, and forms part of Rahmanian’s broader effort to reinterpret the Shahnameh for international audiences through immersive visual storytelling.

After three days in October 2023 of the “Song of the North” shadow theater performances were held in San Francisco. A U-haul truck full of the show supplies and props (including some five hundred handmade puppets and many costumes) was stolen from the Marina District Comfort Inn parking lot. The San Francisco Police Department was able to recover the van and the theater supplies the next day with the help from a bystander; however many of the handmade items were damaged and the projection gear was stolen, leaving the tour in flux. A successful GoFundMe fundraiser was created which helped replace many of the missing items and rebuild the show.

OTHER NOTABLE WORKS

In 2003, Rahmanian co-founded and was president (2004–2007) ArteEast, a leading New York-based nonprofit organization dedicated to engaging a growing global audience with the contemporary arts of the Middle East and North Africa.

In 2009, he wrote and illustrated a graphic autobiography entitled To Myself With Love of which the illustrations were an exhibition called MULTIVERSE at the Halsey Institute of Contemporary Art in 2011.

In 2016, he was commissioned by the Onassis Foundation to write and direct a shadow play based on the Greek tragedy of Antigone, called Mina's Dream.

== Artistic Approach ==
Rahmanian’s work integrates Persian miniature painting, calligraphy, and epic storytelling with contemporary digital media. His long-term engagement with the Shahnameh represents a cross-disciplinary effort to reinterpret a canonical literary work across multiple formats, including books, animation, audio, and performance.

== Personal life ==
Rahmanian is married to Melissa Hibbard, his creative partner and producer, with whom he has a daughter, named Sufi.

== Bibliography ==
- Shahnameh: The Epic of the Persian Kings the illustrated edition 2013
- To Myself with Love 2006 (to be published)
- Zahhak: The Legend of The Serpent King (pop up book) 2018

== Filmography ==
- The Seventh Day (1996)
- An I Within (1999)
- Breaking Bread (2000)
- Sir Alfred of Charles de Gaulle Airport (2001)
- Shahrbanoo (2002)
- Day Break (2005)
- The Glass House (2008)

== Stage plays ==
- Zahhak: The Legend of the Serpent King (2014)
- Feathers of Fire (2016)
- Mina's Dream (2016)
- Song of the North (2023)
