= Mian Deh, Rudbar-e Jonubi =

Mian Deh ميان ده
- Village
- Country: Iran
- Province: Kerman
- County: Rudbar-e Jonubi
- Bakhsh: Central
- Rural District: Nehzatabad

Population (2006)
  - Total: 116
- Time zone: UTC+3:30 (IRST)
  - Summer (DST): UTC+4:30 (IRDT)

Mian Deh (Persian: ميان ده, also Romanized as Mīān Deh) is a village in Nehzatabad Rural District, in the Central District of Rudbar-e Jonubi County, Kerman Province, Iran.

Mian Deh is situated close to Hajji Dela.

At the 2006 census, its population was 116, in 21 families.
