= Khalilabad, Ardakan =

Khalilabad خليل اباد
- Village
- Location within Iran
- Coordinates: 32°23′27″N 53°28′29″E
- Country: Iran
- Province: Yazd
- County: Ardakan
- Bakhsh: Aqda
- Rural District: Narestan

Population (2006)
  - Total: 165
- Time zone: UTC+3:30 (IRST)
  - Summer (DST): UTC+4:30 (IRDT)

Khalilabad (Persian: خليل اباد, also Romanized as Khalīlābād) is a village in Narestan Rural District, Aqda District, Ardakan County, Yazd Province, Iran. At the 2006 census, its population was 165, in 54 families.
