= Xəlilabad =

- Municipality
- Location within Azerbaijan
- Coordinates: 39°09′13″N 48°28′41″E
- Country: Azerbaijan
- Rayon: Jalilabad

Population
  - Total: 1,372
- Time zone: UTC+4 (AZT)

Xəlilabad (also, Xililabad and Khalilabad) is a village and municipality in the Jalilabad Rayon of Azerbaijan. It has a population of 1,372.
