= Shahinabad, Urmia =

Village in Urmia County, West Azerbaijan Province, Iran

Shahinabad شاهين اباد
- Village
- Location within Iran
- Coordinates: 37°28′00″N 45°13′00″E
- Country: Iran
- Province: West Azerbaijan
- County: Urmia
- Bakhsh: Central
- Rural District: Torkaman

Population (2006)
  - Total: 222
- Time zone: UTC+3:30 (IRST)
  - Summer (DST): UTC+4:30 (IRDT)

Shahinabad (Persian: شاهين اباد, romanized: Shāhīnābād; Syriac: Shīnābād) (Note: Also known as Cheinabot.) is a village in Torkaman Rural District, in the Central District of Urmia County, West Azerbaijan Province, Iran. At the 2006 census, its population was 222, in 54 families.

== History ==
Shīnābād (today called Shahinabad) was inhabited by 30 Church of the East Christian families who had no church or priest in 1862, according to the Russian archimandrite Sophoniah, at which time the village was served by the bishop Mār Gabriel of Ardishai. Prior to the First World War, there were 60 Assyrian houses at Shīnābād, as per the list presented by Agha Petros to the Lausanne Peace Conference in 1922. It was located in the Baranduz District.

== Bibliography ==
- Gaunt, David (2006). Massacres, Resistance, Protectors: Muslim-Christian Relations in Eastern Anatolia during World War I. Gorgias Press.
- Wilmshurst, David (2000). The Ecclesiastical Organisation of the Church of the East, 1318–1913 (PDF). Peeters Publishers.
