= Miyan Rud Rural District =

Rural district in Hamadan province, Iran

Miyan Rud Rural District Persian: دهستان ميان رود
- Rural District
- Location within Iran
- Coordinates: 34°31′N 48°09′E
- Country: Iran
- Province: Hamadan
- County: Tuyserkan
- District: Qolqol Rud
- Established: 1987
- Capital: Velashjerd

Population (2016)
  - Total: 8,231
- Time zone: UTC+3:30 (IRST)

Miyan Rud Rural District (Persian: دهستان ميان رود) is in Qolqol Rud District of Tuyserkan County, Hamadan province, Iran. Its capital is the village of Velashjerd.

== Demographics ==
=== Population ===
At the time of the 2006 National Census, the rural district's population was 10,449 in 2,305 households. There were 9,321 inhabitants in 2,656 households at the following census of 2011. The 2016 census measured the population of the rural district as 8,231 in 2,577 households. The most populous of its 24 villages was Lamiyan, with 1,876 people.

=== Other villages in the rural district ===
- Kanjvaran-e Olya
- Kanjvaran-e Sofla
- Kanjvaran-e Vosta
- Minabad
- Moradabad
- Qaleh Now
- Saziyan
- Shanabad
