= Khalilabad, Iranshahr =

Khalilabad خليل اباد
- Village
- Location within Iran
- Coordinates: 27°13′06″N 60°42′55″E
- Country: Iran
- Province: Sistan and Baluchestan
- County: Iranshahr
- Bakhsh: Central
- Rural District: Howmeh

Population (2006)
  - Total: 57
- Time zone: UTC+3:30 (IRST)
  - Summer (DST): UTC+4:30 (IRDT)

Khalilabad (Persian: خليل اباد, also Romanized as Khalīlābād) is a village in Howmeh Rural District, in the Central District of Iranshahr County, Sistan and Baluchestan province, Iran. At the 2006 census, its population was 57, in 18 families. It is located at 25°9'40N 69°36'30E with an altitude of 9 meters (32 feet). The distance from this village to Pakistan's capital Islamabad is approximately 564 km.
