= Mian Deh, Jebalbarez =

Mian Deh ميان ده
- Village
- Location within Iran
- Coordinates: 28°54′12″N 57°51′35″E
- Country: Iran
- Province: Kerman
- County: Jiroft
- Bakhsh: Jebalbarez
- Rural District: Maskun

Population (2006)
  - Total: 23
- Time zone: UTC+3:30 (IRST)
  - Summer (DST): UTC+4:30 (IRDT)

Mian Deh (Persian: ميان ده, also Romanized as Mīān Deh) is a village in Maskun Rural District, Jebalbarez District, Jiroft County, Kerman Province, Iran. At the 2006 census, its population was 23, in 7 families.
