= Khalilabad, Fariman =

Village in Razavi Khorasan, Iran

Khalilabad خليل اباد
- Village
- Location within Iran
- Coordinates: 35°32′07″N 60°01′51″E
- Country: Iran
- Province: Razavi Khorasan
- County: Fariman
- Bakhsh: Qalandarabad
- Rural District: Qalandarabad

Population (2006)
  - Total: 47
- Time zone: UTC+3:30 (IRST)
  - Summer (DST): UTC+4:30 (IRDT)

Khalilabad (Persian: خليل اباد, also Romanized as Khalīlābād) is a village in Qalandarabad Rural District, Qalandarabad District, Fariman County, Razavi Khorasan Province, Iran. At the 2006 census, its population was 47, in 11 families.
