= Barfian, Markazi =

Barfian برفيان
- Village
- Location within Iran
- Coordinates: 33°35′54″N 49°44′31″E
- Country: Iran
- Province: Markazi
- County: Khomeyn
- Bakhsh: Kamareh
- Rural District: Chahar Cheshmeh

Population (2006)
  - Total: 209
- Time zone: UTC+3:30 (IRST)
  - Summer (DST): UTC+4:30 (IRDT)

Barfian (Persian: برفيان, also Romanized as Barfīān, Barfeyān, and Barfiyan) is a village in Chahar Cheshmeh Rural District, Kamareh District, Khomeyn County, Markazi Province, Iran. At the 2006 census, its population was 209, in 61 families.
