= Tol Rigi, Jahrom =

Tol Rigi تل ريگي
- Village
- Location within Iran
- Coordinates: 28°32′00″N 53°35′00″E
- Country: Iran
- Province: Fars
- County: Jahrom
- Bakhsh: Central
- Rural District: Jolgah

Population (2006)
  - Total: 1,150
- Time zone: UTC+3:30 (IRST)
  - Summer (DST): UTC+4:30 (IRDT)

Tol Rigi (Persian: تل ريگي, also Romanized as Tol Rīgī) is a village in Jolgah Rural District, in the Central District of Jahrom County, Fars province, Iran. At the 2006 census, its population was 1,150, in 235 families.
