= Dobiran =

City in Fars province, Iran

Dobiran Persian: دبيران
- City
- Location within Iran
- Coordinates: 28°24′18″N 54°11′16″E
- Country: Iran
- Province: Fars
- County: Zarrin Dasht
- District: Central
- Founded as city: 2005
- Elevation: 1,112 m (3,648 ft)

Population (2016)
  - Total: 13,809
- Time zone: UTC+3:30 (IRST)
- Area code: 071

Dobiran (Persian: دبيران) (Note: Also romanized as Dabiran, Dabīrān, and Dobīrān; also known as Doborān, Dooban, Dowbān, Dowbarān, Dowborān, and Dūborān) (in local dialect: Dobran) is a city in the Central District of Zarrin Dasht County, Fars province, Iran, serving as the administrative center for Dobiran Rural District. (Note: Formerly Dasht-e Khak Rural District) The city is located 270 km from Shiraz, at the intersection of the borders of Darab, Fasa, Jahrom, and Lar counties.

== Demographics ==
=== Population ===
At the time of the 2006 National Census, the city's population was 9,897 in 2,119 households. The following census in 2011 counted 12,682 people in 3,188 households. The 2016 census measured the population of the city as 13,809 people in 3,685 households.

According to the 2016 census, the majority of the population are Arabic speakers and Persians (Arabs: Jabareh tribe, Shir tribe) and (Persians: Darreh Shuri and Lari).

== Etymology ==
The initial core of the formation of Dobiran city dates back to the beginning of the first decade of the 1300s Solar Hijri (1920s), when some nomadic tribal families chose to settle and become sedentary in the Dobran plain, building the first houses in the current location of Dobiran city. Before the formation of Dobran village, Shah Alamdar was the most important settlement in the region. Some nomadic people settled near Imamzadeh Shah Alamdar, 8 km south of current Dobiran, at the foot of Namak Mountain.

The etymology of Dobran varies. Some believe the rich pastures and favorable climate in the plain and surrounding slopes caused livestock to lamb and be sheared twice a year, hence "Dobran." Another narrative attributes it to the seasonal river dividing the area into two sides ("do bar"). Others link it to the Dobran qanat predating the settlement.

The name Dobiran is recent. In July 2005, per Cabinet approval, Dobran village became a city named Dobiran. Earlier, in 1992, the Cabinet renamed Dasht-e Khak Rural District, centered on Dobran, to Dobiran Rural District.

== Natural features ==
The city is at 28°24' N latitude and 54°11' E longitude, at an elevation of 1,170 meters above sea level.

Due to low latitude, subtropical high pressure, and distance from moisture sources, it has a hot, semi-arid climate with average annual rainfall not exceeding 200 mm.

Maximum temperatures reach 45 °C in July and August; minimums drop to -5 °C in early January. Very hot summers and cold, dry winters characterize the climate.

The geological structure relates mainly to the Mesozoic and Cenozoic eras, influenced by the Fars Group (Mishan and Asmari-Jahrom) and Hormuz formations. The salt mine at Namak Mountain near Imamzadeh Shah Alamdar (proven reserves: 800,000 tons), 10 km south, and Dasht-e Khak gypsum mine are the only mineral resources.

== Human features ==
Per the 2016 census, Dobiran (13,809 people) is Zarrin Dasht County's second-largest city after Hajiabad (20,501). Ethnically, it comprises Persian speakers, Arabs (Jabareh tribe, descendants of Jabir ibn Abdullah al-Ansari, a Khamsa tribe), and few Bakhtiari. All were nomads settled during Reza Shah's Pahlavi era. Residents are hardworking, relying on agriculture and livestock despite droughts.

The populace is deeply religious, observing Tasua and Ashura mourning for Imam Hussein and Abbas ibn Ali. During Arba'een, many mourn at Imamzadeh Shah Alamdar.

The city has contributed 30 martyrs to Islam and the revolution.

== Economic and agricultural status ==
Lacking major industry, the economy relies on agriculture, livestock, and trade. Recently, vehicle trading and real estate have grown, gaining regional recognition.

Key crops: barley, wheat, cotton. Water scarcity is critical; wells tap aquifers at ~200 m depth. Droughts and over-extraction have depleted resources, crisis-hit agriculture.

Government counters with earth dams; the Angabineh River dam is a major watershed project.

== Demographics ==
=== Population ===
At the time of the 2006 National Census, the city's population was 9,897 in 2,119 households. The following census in 2011 counted 12,682 people in 3,188 households. The 2016 census measured the population of the city as 13,809 people in 3,685 households.
