= Izadkhast-e Gharbi Rural District =

Rural district in Fars province, Iran

Izadkhast-e Gharbi Rural District Persian: دهستان ايزدخواست غربي
- Rural District
- Location within Iran
- Coordinates: 28°13′59″N 54°19′17″E
- Country: Iran
- Province: Fars
- County: Zarrin Dasht
- District: Izadkhast
- Capital: Shahr-e Pir

Population (2016)
  - Total: 4,864
- Time zone: UTC+3:30 (IRST)

Izadkhast-e Gharbi Rural District (Persian: دهستان ايزدخواست غربي), (Note: Formerly Izadkhast Rural District (دهستان ايزدخواست)) is in Izadkhast District of Zarrin Dasht County, Fars province, Iran. It is administered from the city of Shahr-e Pir.

== Demographics ==
=== Population ===
At the time of the 2006 National Census, the rural district's population was 2,946 in 682 households. There were 5,836 inhabitants in 1,484 households at the following census of 2011. The 2016 census measured the population of the rural district as 4,864 in 1,333 households. The most populous of its 16 villages was Deh Now, with 2,252 people.
