= Mian Deh, Baft =

Mian Deh ميان ده
- Village
- Location within Iran
- Coordinates: 29°21′50″N 56°38′18″E
- Country: Iran
- Province: Kerman
- County: Baft
- Bakhsh: Central
- Rural District: Kiskan

Population (2006)
  - Total: 123
- Time zone: UTC+3:30 (IRST)
  - Summer (DST): UTC+4:30 (IRDT)

Mian Deh (Persian: ميان ده, also Romanized as Mīān Deh; also known as Deh-e Mīān) is a village in Kiskan Rural District, in the Central District of Baft County, Kerman Province, Iran. At the 2006 census, its population was 123, in 34 families.
