= Izadkhast-e Sharqi Rural District =

Rural district in Fars province, Iran

Izadkhast-e Sharqi Rural District Persian: دهستان ايزدخواست شرقي
- Rural District
- Location within Iran
- Coordinates: 28°07′50″N 54°35′59″E
- Country: Iran
- Province: Fars
- County: Zarrin Dasht
- District: Izadkhast
- Capital: Gelkuyeh

Population (2016)
  - Total: 5,133
- Time zone: UTC+3:30 (IRST)

Izadkhast-e Sharqi Rural District (Persian: دهستان ايزدخواست شرقي) is in Izadkhast District of Zarrin Dasht County, Fars province, Iran. Its capital is the village of Gelkuyeh.

== Demographics ==
=== Population ===
At the time of the 2006 National Census, the rural district's population was 3,014 in 664 households. There were 3,750 inhabitants in 897 households at the following census of 2011. The 2016 census measured the population of the rural district as 5,133 in 1,390 households. The most populous of its 28 villages was Mazayjan, with 2,655 people.
