= Dobiran Rural District =

Rural district in Fars province, Iran

Dobiran Rural District Persian: دهستان دبيران
- Rural District
- Location within Iran
- Coordinates: 28°28′N 54°11′E
- Country: Iran
- Province: Fars
- County: Zarrin Dasht
- District: Central
- Capital: Dobiran

Population (2016)
  - Total: 691
- Time zone: UTC+3:30 (IRST)

Dobiran Rural District (Persian: دهستان دبيران) (Note: Formerly Dasht-e Khak Rural District (دهستان دشت خاک)) is in the Central District of Zarrin Dasht County, Fars province, Iran. It is administered from the city of Dobiran.

== Demographics ==
=== Population ===
At the time of the 2006 National Census, the rural district's population was 2,160 in 481 households. There were 148 inhabitants in 38 households at the following census of 2011. The 2016 census measured the population of the rural district as 691 in 171 households. The most populous of its 32 villages was Abgarm-e Balayi, with 312 people.
