= Qolqol Rud Rural District =

Rural district in Hamadan province, Iran

Qolqol Rud Rural District Persian: دهستان قلقل رود
- Rural District
- Location within Iran
- Coordinates: 34°30′N 48°15′E
- Country: Iran
- Province: Hamadan
- County: Tuyserkan
- District: Qolqol Rud
- Capital: Farasfaj

Population (2016)
  - Total: 4,686
- Time zone: UTC+3:30 (IRST)

Qolqol Rud Rural District (Persian: دهستان قلقل رود) is in Qolqol Rud District of Tuyserkan County, Hamadan province, Iran. It is administered from the city of Farasfaj.

== Demographics ==
=== Population ===
At the time of the 2006 National Census, the rural district's population was 6,221 in 1,469 households. There were 5,842 inhabitants in 1,695 households at the following census of 2011. The 2016 census measured the population of the rural district as 4,686 in 1,429 households. The most populous of its 16 villages was Chasht Khvoreh, with 681 people.

=== Other villages in the rural district ===
- Hajji Tu
- Jera
- Karimabad
- Menjan
- Qasemabad
- Sutlaq
