= Zirab Rural District =

Rural district in Fars province, Iran

Zirab Rural District Persian: دهستان زیرآب
- Rural District
- Location within Iran
- Coordinates: 28°22′56″N 54°37′25″E
- Country: Iran
- Province: Fars
- County: Zarrin Dasht
- District: Central
- Capital: Zirab

Population (2016)
  - Total: 7,369
- Time zone: UTC+3:30 (IRST)

Zirab Rural District (Persian: دهستان زیرآب) (Note: Formerly Hajjiabad Rural District (دهستان حاجی‌آباد)) is in the Central District of Zarrin Dasht County, Fars province, Iran. Its capital is the village of Zirab.

== Demographics ==
=== Population ===
At the time of the 2006 National Census, the rural district's population was 6,279 in 1,321 households. There were 7,177 inhabitants in 1,758 households at the following census of 2011. The 2016 census measured the population of the rural district as 7,369 in 2,109 households. The most populous of its 53 villages was Zirab, with 3,288 people.
