= Izadkhast District =

District in Fars province, Iran

Izadkhast District Persian: بخش ایزدخواست
- District
- Location within Iran
- Coordinates: 28°10′37″N 54°31′23″E
- Country: Iran
- Province: Fars
- County: Zarrin Dasht
- Capital: Shahr-e Pir

Population (2016)
  - Total: 18,924
- Time zone: UTC+3:30 (IRST)

Izadkhast District (Persian: بخش ایزدخواست) is in Zarrin Dasht County, Fars province, Iran. Its capital is the city of Shahr-e Pir.

== Demographics ==
=== Population ===
At the time of the 2006 National Census, the district's population was 13,121 in 2,895 households. The following census in 2011 counted 17,686 people in 4,412 households. The 2016 census measured the population of the district as 18,924 inhabitants in 5,192 households.

=== Administrative divisions ===
Izadkhast District Population
Administrative Divisions	2006	2011	2016
Izadkhast-e Gharbi RD (Note: Formerly Izadkhast Rural District)	2,946	5,836	4,864
Izadkhast-e Sharqi RD	3,014	3,750	5,133
Shahr-e Pir (city)	7,161	8,100	8,927
Total	13,121	17,686	18,924
RD = Rural District
