= Khosuyeh Rural District =

Rural district in Fars province, Iran

Khosuyeh Rural District Persian: دهستان خسويه
- Rural District
- Location within Iran
- Coordinates: 28°31′27″N 54°24′12″E
- Country: Iran
- Province: Fars
- County: Zarrin Dasht
- District: Central
- Capital: Khosuyeh

Population (2016)
  - Total: 10,483
- Time zone: UTC+3:30 (IRST)

Khosuyeh Rural District (Persian: دهستان خسويه) is in the Central District of Zarrin Dasht County, Fars province, Iran. Its capital is the village of Khosuyeh.

== Demographics ==
=== Population ===
At the time of the 2006 National Census, the rural district's population was 10,641 in 2,367 households. There were 10,482 inhabitants in 2,735 households at the following census of 2011. The 2016 census measured the population of the rural district as 10,483 in 3,048 households. The most populous of its 15 villages was Khosuyeh, with 2,856 people.
