= Central District (Zarrin Dasht County) =

District in Fars province, Iran

Central District (Zarrin Dasht County) Persian: بخش مرکزی شهرستان زرین‌دشت
- District
- Location within Iran
- Coordinates: 28°25′48″N 54°27′27″E
- Country: Iran
- Province: Fars
- County: Zarrin Dasht
- Capital: Hajjiabad

Population (2016)
  - Total: 54,027
- Time zone: UTC+3:30 (IRST)

The Central District of Zarrin Dasht County (Persian: بخش مرکزی شهرستان زرین‌دشت) is in Fars province, Iran. Its capital is the city of Hajjiabad.

== Demographics ==
=== Population ===
At the time of the 2006 National Census, the district's population was 47,323 in 10,483 households. The following census in 2011 counted 50,990 people in 12,840 households. The 2016 census measured the population of the district as 54,027 inhabitants in 15,074 households.

=== Administrative divisions ===
Central District (Zarrin Dasht County) Population
Administrative Divisions	2006	2011	2016
Dobiran RD (Note: Formerly Dasht-e Khak Rural District)	2,160	148	691
Khosuyeh RD	10,641	10,482	10,483
Zirab RD (Note: Formerly Hajjiabad Rural District)	6,279	7,177	7,369
Dobiran (city)	9,897	12,682	13,809
Hajjiabad (city)	18,346	20,501	21,675
Total	47,323	50,990	54,027
RD = Rural District
