= Zarrin Dasht County =

County in Fars province, Iran

Zarrin Dasht County Persian: شهرستان زرین‌دشت
- County
- Location of Zarrin Dasht County in Fars province (bottom right, yellow)

- Location of Fars province in Iran
- Coordinates: 28°20′N 54°28′E
- Country: Iran
- Province: Fars
- Capital: Hajjiabad
- Districts: Central, Izadkhast

Population (2016)
  - Total: 73,199
- Time zone: UTC+3:30 (IRST)

Zarrin Dasht County (Persian: شهرستان زرین‌دشت) is in Fars province, Iran. Its capital is the city of Hajjiabad.

== Demographics ==
=== Population ===
At the time of the 2006 National Census, the county's population was 60,444 in 13,378 households. The following census in 2011 counted 69,438 people in 17,402 households. The 2016 census measured the population of the county as 73,199 in 20,328 households.

=== Administrative divisions ===
Zarrin Dasht County's population history and administrative structure over three consecutive censuses are shown in the following table.

Zarrin Dasht County Population
Administrative Divisions	2006	2011	2016
Central District	47,323	50,990	54,027
Dobiran RD (Note: Formerly Dasht-e Khak Rural District)	2,160	148	691
Khosuyeh RD	10,641	10,482	10,483
Zirab RD (Note: Formerly Hajjiabad Rural District)	6,279	7,177	7,369
Dobiran (city)	9,897	12,682	13,809
Hajjiabad (city)	18,346	20,501	21,675
Izadkhast District	13,121	17,686	18,924
Izadkhast-e Gharbi RD (Note: Formerly Izadkhast Rural District)	2,946	5,836	4,864
Izadkhast-e Sharqi RD	3,014	3,750	5,133
Shahr-e Pir (city)	7,161	8,100	8,927
Total	60,444	69,438	73,199
RD = Rural District

== See also ==
Media related to Zarrin Dasht County at Wikimedia Commons
