= Qolqol Rud District =

District in Hamadan province, Iran

Qolqol Rud District Persian: بخش قلقل‌ رود
- District
- Location within Iran
- Coordinates: 34°29′N 48°17′E
- Country: Iran
- Province: Hamadan
- County: Tuyserkan
- Established: 1989
- Capital: Farasfaj

Population (2016)
  - Total: 16,773
- Time zone: UTC+3:30 (IRST)

Qolqol Rud District (Persian: بخش قلقل ‌رود) is in Tuyserkan County, Hamadan province, Iran. Its capital is the city of Farasfaj.

== Demographics ==
=== Ethnicity ===
Most of Qolqol Rud District's villages are populated by Kurds.

=== Population ===
At the time of the 2006 National Census, the district's population was 21,011 in 4,913 households. The following census in 2011 counted 19,572 people in 5,586 households. The 2016 census measured the population of the district as 16,773 inhabitants in 5,178 households.

=== Administrative divisions ===
Qolqol Rud District Population
Administrative Divisions	2006	2011	2016
Kamal Rud RD	2,733	2,688	2,330
Miyan Rud RD	10,449	9,321	8,231
Qolqol Rud RD	6,221	5,842	4,686
Farasfaj (city)	1,608	1,721	1,526
Total	21,011	19,572	16,773
RD = Rural District
