= Seyyed Shahab =

Seyyed Shahab or Seyyedshahab (Persian: سيدشهاب) may refer to:

- Seyyed Shahab, Hamadan
- Seyyed Shahab, Kermanshah
- Seyyed Shahab Rural District, in Hamadan Province
