= Vardavard =

Vardavard (Persian: ورداورد), also rendered as Var Davad or Vardavad or Vardavar or Vard Avard or Vardavud or Varood, may refer to:

- Vardavard-e Olya, Hamadan Province
- Vardavard-e Sofla, Hamadan Province
- Vardavard-e Vosta, Hamadan Province
- Vardavard Metro Station, in Tehran
