= Eynabad =

Eynabad or Ainabad (Persian: عين اباد) may refer to:

- Eynabad, East Azerbaijan
- Eynabad, Kabudarahang, Hamadan Province
- Eynabad, Razan, Hamadan Province
- Eynabad, Tuyserkan, Hamadan Province
- Eynabad, Markazi
- Eynabad, Fazl, Nishapur County, Razavi Khorasan Province
