= Qaleh-ye Sheykh =

Qaleh-ye Sheykh or Qaleh Sheykh (Persian: قلعه شيخ) may refer to:

- Qaleh-ye Sheykh, Alborz
- Qaleh-ye Sheykh, East Azerbaijan
- Qaleh-ye Sheykh, Hamadan
- Qaleh-ye Sheykh, Khuzestan
- Qaleh-ye Sheykh, Lorestan
- Qaleh Sheykh, Markazi
- Qaleh-ye Sheykh, Tehran
