= Showqabad =

Showqabad (Persian: شوق اباد) may refer to:

- Showqabad, Hamadan
- Showqabad, Rigan, Kerman Province
- Showqabad, North Khorasan
