= Pir Gheyb, Hamadan =

Village in Hamadan province, Iran

Pir Gheyb Persian: پيرغيب
- Village
- Location within Iran
- Coordinates: 34°23′46″N 48°31′36″E
- Country: Iran
- Province: Hamadan
- County: Tuyserkan
- District: Central
- Rural District: Seyyed Shahab

Population (2016)
  - Total: 157
- Time zone: UTC+3:30 (IRST)

Pir Gheyb (Persian: پيرغيب) (Note: Also romanized as Pīr Gheyb) is a village in Seyyed Shahab Rural District of the Central District in Tuyserkan County, Hamadan province, Iran.

== Demographics ==
=== Population ===
At the time of the 2006 National Census, the village's population was 252 in 69 households. The following census in 2011 counted 203 people in 60 households. The 2016 census measured the population of the village as 157 people in 56 households.
