= Dowlai =

Village in Hamadan province, Iran

Dowlai Persian: دولايي
- Village
- Location within Iran
- Coordinates: 34°29′29″N 48°31′18″E
- Country: Iran
- Province: Hamadan
- County: Tuyserkan
- District: Central
- Rural District: Seyyed Shahab

Population (2016)
  - Total: 253
- Time zone: UTC+3:30 (IRST)

Dowlai (Persian: دولايي) (Note: Also romanized as Do Lā’ī and Dowlā’ī; also known as Dollā’ī) is a village in Seyyed Shahab Rural District of the Central District in Tuyserkan County, Hamadan province, Iran.

== Demographics ==
=== Population ===
At the time of the 2006 National Census, the village's population was 274 in 51 households. The following census in 2011 counted 283 people in 61 households. The 2016 census measured the population of the village as 253 people in 69 households.
