= Mahmudabad, Tuyserkan =

Village in Hamadan province, Iran

Mahmudabad Persian: محموداباد
- Village
- Location within Iran
- Coordinates: 34°31′03″N 48°20′14″E
- Country: Iran
- Province: Hamadan
- County: Tuyserkan
- District: Central
- Rural District: Hayaquq-e Nabi

Population (2016)
  - Total: 605
- Time zone: UTC+3:30 (IRST)

Mahmudabad (Persian: محموداباد) (Note: Also romanized as Maḩmūdābād) is a village in Hayaquq-e Nabi Rural District of the Central District in Tuyserkan County, Hamadan province, Iran.

== Demographics ==
=== Population ===
At the time of the 2006 National Census, the village's population was 720 in 178 households. The following census in 2011 counted 673 people in 202 households. The 2016 census measured the population of the village as 605 people in 186 households.
