= Jafariyeh, Hamadan =

Village in Hamadan province, Iran

Jafariyeh Persian: جعفريه
- Village
- Location within Iran
- Coordinates: 34°31′55″N 48°23′31″E
- Country: Iran
- Province: Hamadan
- County: Tuyserkan
- District: Central
- Rural District: Hayaquq-e Nabi

Population (2016)
  - Total: 1,495
- Time zone: UTC+3:30 (IRST)

Jafariyeh (Persian: جعفريه) (Note: Also romanized as Ja‘farīyeh; formerly known as Qaleh-ye Jafarbeyk (قلعه جعفربیک); also known as Do Qal‘eh, Qal‘eh-ye Ja‘far Beyg, and Qal‘eh-ye Ja‘farbag) is a village in, and the capital of, Hayaquq-e Nabi Rural District in the Central District of Tuyserkan County, Hamadan province, Iran.

== Demographics ==
=== Population ===
At the time of the 2006 National Census, the village's population was 1,774 in 462 households. The following census in 2011 counted 1,848 people in 548 households. The 2016 census measured the population of the village as 1,495 people in 487 households, the most populous in its rural district.
