= Baba Pir Ali =

Village in Hamadan province, Iran

Baba Pir Ali Persian: باباپيرعلي
- Village

- Location within Iran
- Coordinates: 34°37′40″N 48°20′49″E
- Country: Iran
- Province: Hamadan
- County: Tuyserkan
- District: Central
- Rural District: Korzan Rud

Population (2016)
  - Total: 606
- Time zone: UTC+3:30 (IRST)

Baba Pir Ali (Persian: باباپيرعلي) (Note: Also romanized as Bābā Pīr ‘Alī) is a village in Korzan Rud Rural District of the Central District in Tuyserkan County, Hamadan province, Iran.

== Demographics ==
=== Population ===
At the time of the 2006 National Census, the village's population was 744 in 223 households. The following census in 2011 counted 720 people in 264 households. The 2016 census measured the population of the village as 606 people in 220 households.
