= Abarlaq =

Abarlaq (Persian: ابرلاق), also known as Avaleh and Avala, may refer to:

- Abarlaq-e Olya
- Abarlaq-e Sofla
