= Baharab, Hamadan =

Baharab بهاراب
- Village
- Location within Iran
- Coordinates: 34°38′09″N 48°11′09″E
- Country: Iran
- Province: Hamadan
- County: Tuyserkan
- Bakhsh: Central
- Rural District: Khorram Rud

Population (2006)
  - Total: 239
- Time zone: UTC+3:30 (IRST)
  - Summer (DST): UTC+4:30 (IRDT)

Baharab (Persian: بهاراب, also Romanized as Bahārāb; also known as Qal‘eh Amīr Khān and Qal‘eh-ye Amīr Khān) is a village in Khorram Rud Rural District, in the Central District of Tuyserkan County, Hamadan Province, Iran. At the 2006 census, its population was 239, in 72 families.مرحوم امیر خان یکی دیگر از ضابطین مرحوم عباسقلی خان سرتیپ ( چلبی) نواده مرحوم ساروخان حاکم همدان و مالک خرمرود و کرزانرود تویسرکان در دوره صفویه بوده است که اردلان‌ها میهمان در قلعه مرحوم ساروخان واقع در اشتران علیه املاک موروثی مرحوم عباسقلی خان چلبی انبار گندم دولت که در اختیار مرحوم عباسقلی خان بود را غارت کردند و دولت بجای خسارت گندم در سالهای قحطی املاک مرحوم عباسقلی خان را توقیف و اردلان‌ها و همدستانش با پول حاصل از گندم های مسروقه صاحب املاک فراوانی در خرمرود و کرزانرود و اطراف کرمانشاه شدند وامیر خان را از قلعه بیرون کردند وبر مردمان شریف خرمرود ستم کردند
