= Korzan =

Village in Hamadan province, Iran

Korzan Persian: كرزان
- Village
- Location within Iran
- Coordinates: 34°35′40″N 48°21′09″E
- Country: Iran
- Province: Hamadan
- County: Tuyserkan
- District: Central
- Rural District: Korzan Rud

Population (2016)
  - Total: 440
- Time zone: UTC+3:30 (IRST)

Korzan (Persian: كرزان) (Note: Also romanized as Karzān and Korzān; also known as Kūrzān) is a village in Korzan Rud Rural District of the Central District in Tuyserkan County, Hamadan province, Iran.

== Demographics ==
=== Population ===
At the time of the 2006 National Census, the village's population was 628 in 204 households. The following census in 2011 counted 659 people in 212 households. The 2016 census measured the population of the village as 440 people in 171 households.
