= Emamzadeh Zeyd =

Village in Hamadan province, Iran

Emamzadeh Zeyd Persian: امام زاده زيد
- Village
- Location within Iran
- Coordinates: 34°32′00″N 48°26′33″E
- Country: Iran
- Province: Hamadan
- County: Tuyserkan
- District: Central
- Rural District: Hayaquq-e Nabi

Population (2016)
  - Total: 1,344
- Time zone: UTC+3:30 (IRST)

Emamzadeh Zeyd (Persian: امام زاده زيد) (Note: Also romanized as Emāmzādeh Zeyd; formerly known as Shah Zeyd (شاه زید)) is a village in Hayaquq-e Nabi Rural District of the Central District in Tuyserkan County, Hamadan province, Iran.

== Demographics ==
=== Population ===
At the time of the 2006 National Census, the village's population was 1,384 in 377 households. The following census in 2011 counted 1,358 people in 426 households. The 2016 census measured the population of the village as 1,344 people in 471 households.
