= Badamak, Hamadan =

Village in Hamadan province, Iran

Badamak Persian: بادامك
- Village
- Location within Iran
- Coordinates: 34°29′53″N 48°32′53″E
- Country: Iran
- Province: Hamadan
- County: Tuyserkan
- District: Central
- Rural District: Seyyed Shahab

Population (2016)
  - Total: 430
- Time zone: UTC+3:30 (IRST)

Badamak (Persian: بادامك) (Note: Also romanized as Bādāmak) is a village in Seyyed Shahab Rural District of the Central District in Tuyserkan County, Hamadan province, Iran.

== Demographics ==
=== Population ===
At the time of the 2006 National Census, the village's population was 728 in 184 households. The following census in 2011 counted 564 people in 171 households. The 2016 census measured the population of the village as 430 people in 149 households.
