= Qaleh Nowruz =

Village in Hamadan province, Iran

Qaleh Nowruz Persian: قلعه نوروز
- Village
- Location within Iran
- Coordinates: 34°36′39″N 48°24′44″E
- Country: Iran
- Province: Hamadan
- County: Tuyserkan
- District: Central
- Rural District: Korzan Rud

Population (2016)
  - Total: 213
- Time zone: UTC+3:30 (IRST)

Qaleh Nowruz (Persian: قلعه نوروز) (Note: Also romanized as Qal‘eh Nowrūz) is a village in Korzan Rud Rural District of the Central District in Tuyserkan County, Hamadan province, Iran.

== Demographics ==
=== Population ===
At the time of the 2006 National Census, the village's population was 311 in 85 households. The following census in 2011 counted 253 people in 85 households. The 2016 census measured the population of the village as 213 people in 75 households.
