= Gonbaleh, Tuyserkan =

Gonbaleh گنبله
- Village
- Location within Iran
- Coordinates: 34°37′42″N 48°13′51″E
- Country: Iran
- Province: Hamadan
- County: Tuyserkan
- Bakhsh: Central
- Rural District: Khorram Rud

Population (2006)
  - Total: 356
- Time zone: UTC+3:30 (IRST)
  - Summer (DST): UTC+4:30 (IRDT)

Gonbaleh (Persian: گنبله) is a village in Khorram Rud Rural District, in the Central District of Tuyserkan County, Hamadan Province, Iran. At the 2006 census, its population was 356, in 92 families.
