= Oshtoran =

Village in Hamadan province, Iran

Oshtoran Persian: اشتران
- Village
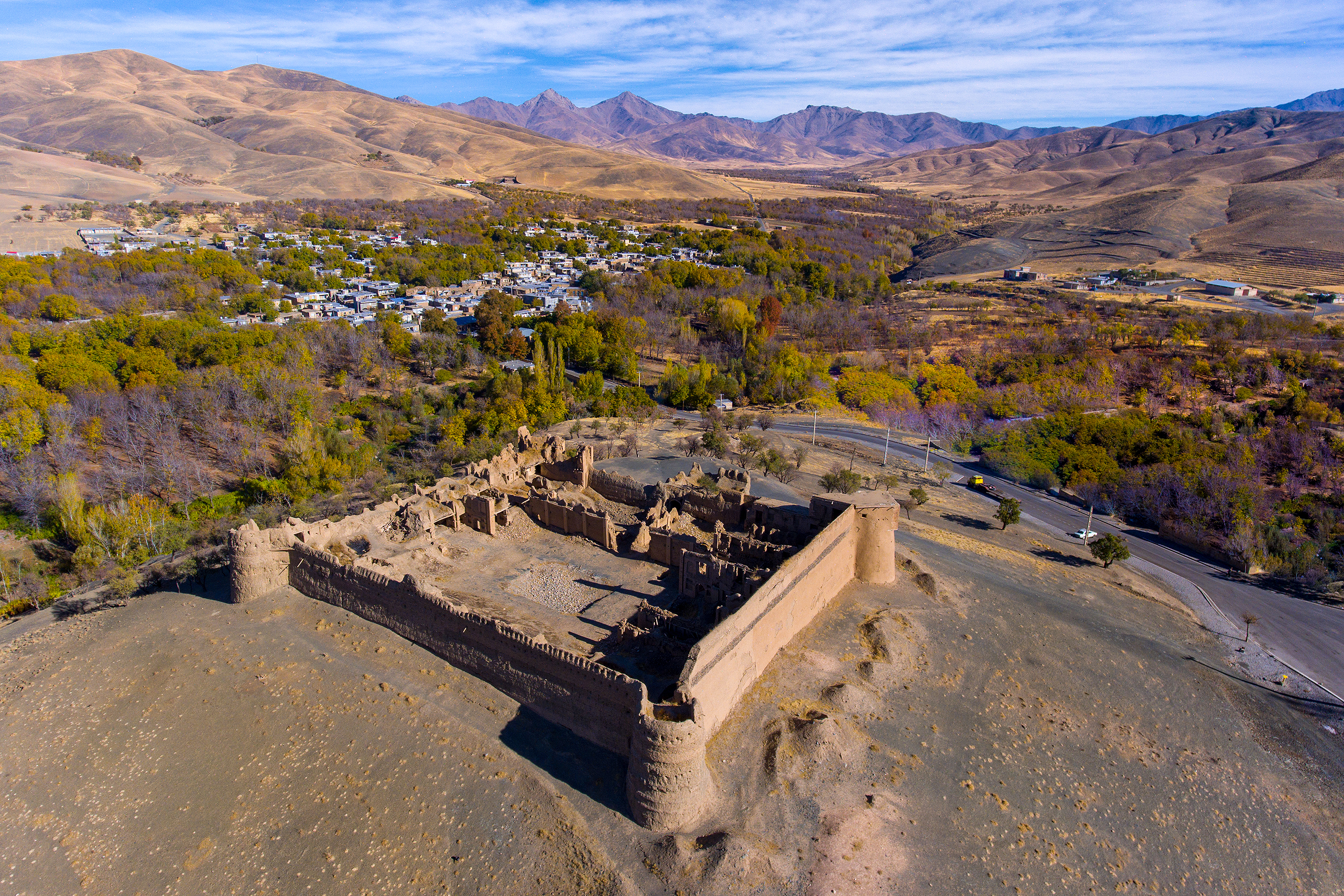
- Castle in the village of Oshtoran

- Location within Iran
- Coordinates: 34°38′19″N 48°17′40″E
- Country: Iran
- Province: Hamadan
- County: Tuyserkan
- District: Central
- Rural District: Khorram Rud

Population (2016)
  - Total: 1,074
- Time zone: UTC+3:30 (IRST)

Oshtoran (Persian: اشتران) (Note: Also romanized as Ashtaran, Ashtarān, and Oshtaran) is a village in, and the capital of, Khorram Rud Rural District in the Central District of Tuyserkan County, Hamadan province, Iran.

== Demographics ==
=== Population ===
At the time of the 2006 National Census, the village's population was 1,328 in 365 households. The following census in 2011 counted 1,291 people in 401 households. The 2016 census measured the population of the village as 1,074 people in 362 households.
