= Qaleh-ye Bakhtiar =

Qaleh-ye Bakhtiar or Qaleh-ye Bakhteyar (Persian: قلعه بختيار) may refer to:

- Qaleh-ye Bakhtiar, Chaharmahal and Bakhtiari
- Qaleh-ye Bakhtiar, Hamadan
