= Darani-ye Olya =

Village in Hamadan province, Iran

Darani-ye Olya Persian: داراني عليا
- Village
- Location within Iran
- Coordinates: 34°30′08″N 48°25′50″E
- Country: Iran
- Province: Hamadan
- County: Tuyserkan
- District: Central
- Rural District: Hayaquq-e Nabi

Population (2016)
  - Total: 469
- Time zone: UTC+3:30 (IRST)

Darani-ye Olya (Persian: داراني عليا) (Note: Also romanized as Dārānī-ye 'Olyā; also known as Dārānī and Dārānī-ye Bālā) is a village in Hayaquq-e Nabi Rural District of the Central District in Tuyserkan County, Hamadan province, Iran.

== Demographics ==
=== Population ===
At the time of the 2006 National Census, the village's population was 646 in 142 households. The following census in 2011 counted 571 people in 163 households. The 2016 census measured the population of the village as 469 people in 160 households.
