= Kohnush =

Village in Hamadan province, Iran

Kohnush Persian: كهنوش
- Village
- Location within Iran
- Coordinates: 34°43′32″N 48°16′40″E
- Country: Iran
- Province: Hamadan
- County: Tuyserkan
- District: Central
- Rural District: Khorram Rud

Population (2016)
  - Total: 1,077
- Time zone: UTC+3:30 (IRST)

Kohnush (Persian: كهنوش) (Note: Also romanized as Kohnūsh; also known as Kūh Nūsh and Kūh-ī-Nūsh) is a village in Khorram Rud Rural District of the Central District in Tuyserkan County, Hamadan province, Iran.

== Demographics ==
=== Population ===
At the time of the 2006 National Census, the village's population was 1,735 in 489 households. The following census in 2011 counted 1,396 people in 456 households. The 2016 census measured the population of the village as 1,077 people in 479 households.
