= Qaleh Qazi, Hamadan =

Village in Hamadan province, Iran

Qaleh Qazi Persian: قلعه قاضي
- Village
- Location within Iran
- Coordinates: 34°32′05″N 48°25′53″E
- Country: Iran
- Province: Hamadan
- County: Tuyserkan
- District: Central
- Rural District: Hayaquq-e Nabi

Population (2016)
  - Total: 451
- Time zone: UTC+3:30 (IRST)

Qaleh Qazi (Persian: قلعه قاضي) (Note: Also romanized as Qal‘eh Qāẕī) is a village in Hayaquq-e Nabi Rural District of the Central District in Tuyserkan County, Hamadan province, Iran.

== Demographics ==
=== Population ===
At the time of the 2006 National Census, the village's population was 693 in 171 households. The following census in 2011 counted 456 people in 154 households. The 2016 census measured the population of the village as 451 people in 159 households.
