= Mobarakabad, Tuyserkan =

Village in Hamadan province, Iran

Mobarakabad Persian: مبارك اباد
- Village
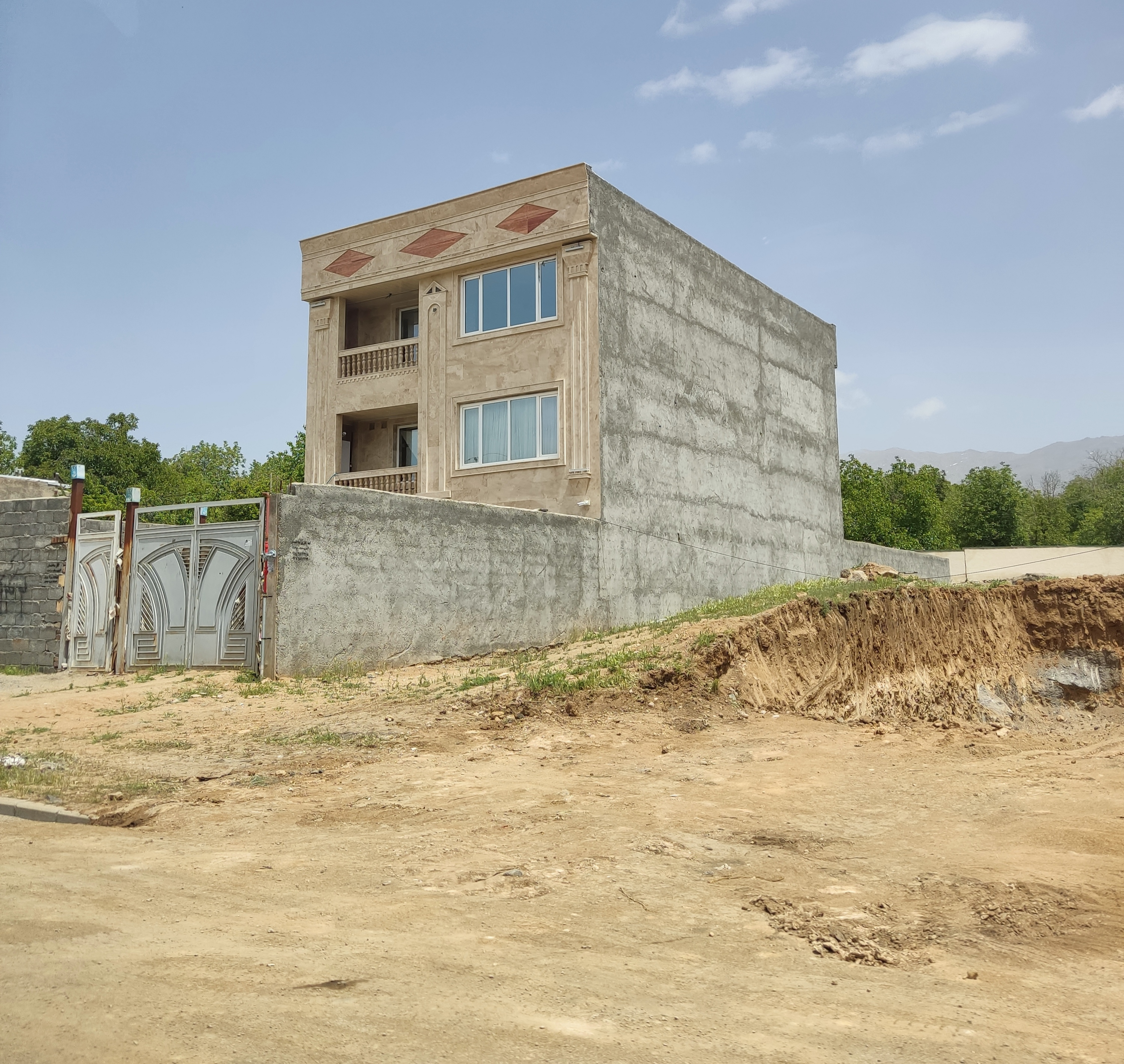
- A building in the village of Mobarakabad

- Location within Iran
- Coordinates: 34°34′22″N 48°25′01″E
- Country: Iran
- Province: Hamadan
- County: Tuyserkan
- District: Central
- Rural District: Hayaquq-e Nabi

Population (2016)
  - Total: 417
- Time zone: UTC+3:30 (IRST)

Mobarakabad (Persian: مبارك اباد) (Note: Also romanized as Mobārakābād; also known as Mubārakābād) is a village in Hayaquq-e Nabi Rural District of the Central District in Tuyserkan County, Hamadan province, Iran.

== Demographics ==
=== Population ===
At the time of the 2006 National Census, the village's population was 623 in 176 households. The following census in 2011 counted 533 people in 179 households. The 2016 census measured the population of the village as 417 people in 167 households.
