= Arzuvaj =

Village in Hamadan province, Iran

Arzuvaj Persian: ارزووج
- Village
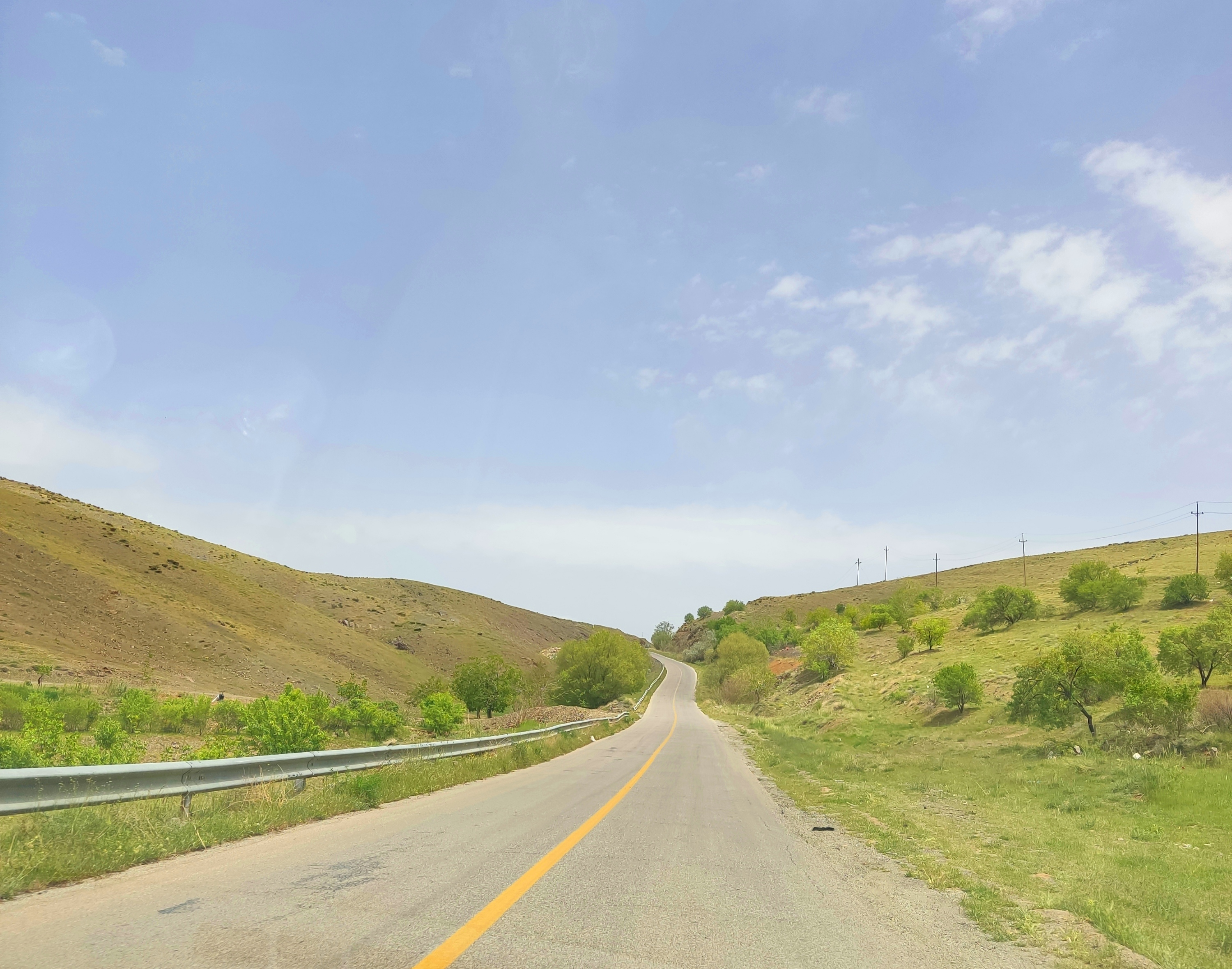
- Landscape near the village of Arzuvaj

- Location within Iran
- Coordinates: 34°39′16″N 48°22′23″E
- Country: Iran
- Province: Hamadan
- County: Tuyserkan
- District: Central
- Rural District: Korzan Rud

Population (2016)
  - Total: 130
- Time zone: UTC+3:30 (IRST)

Arzuvaj (Persian: ارزووج) (Note: Also romanized as Arezūvaj, Ārzūvaj, and Orzūvaj; also known as Āzrūvaj) is a village in Korzan Rud Rural District of the Central District in Tuyserkan County, Hamadan province, Iran.

== Demographics ==
=== Population ===
At the time of the 2006 National Census, the village's population was 169 in 54 households. The following census in 2011 counted 143 people in 57 households. The 2016 census measured the population of the village as 130 people in 58 households.
