= Rud Avar =

Village in Hamadan province, Iran

Rud Avar Persian: روداور
- Village
- Location within Iran
- Coordinates: 34°33′00″N 48°24′40″E
- Country: Iran
- Province: Hamadan
- County: Tuyserkan
- District: Central
- Rural District: Hayaquq-e Nabi

Population (2016)
  - Total: 529
- Time zone: UTC+3:30 (IRST)

Rud Avar (Persian: روداور) (Note: Also romanized as Rūd Āvar; also known as Rood Av) is a village in Hayaquq-e Nabi Rural District of the Central District in Tuyserkan County, Hamadan province, Iran.

== Demographics ==
=== Population ===
At the time of the 2006 National Census, the village's population was 662 in 189 households. The following census in 2011 counted 629 people in 219 households. The 2016 census measured the population of the village as 529 people in 198 households.
