= Qaleh-ye Bakhtiar, Hamadan =

Qaleh-ye Bakhtiar قلعه بختيار
- Village
- Location within Iran
- Coordinates: 34°29′41″N 48°21′23″E
- Country: Iran
- Province: Hamadan
- County: Tuyserkan
- Bakhsh: Central
- Rural District: Hayaquq-e Nabi

Population (2006)
  - Total: 33
- Time zone: UTC+3:30 (IRST)
  - Summer (DST): UTC+4:30 (IRDT)

Qaleh-ye Bakhtiar (Persian: قلعه بختيار, also Romanized as Qal‘eh-ye Bakhtīār and Qal‘eh-ye Bakhteyār) is a village in Hayaquq-e Nabi Rural District, in the Central District of Tuyserkan County, Hamadan Province, Iran. At the 2006 census, its population was 33, in 9 families.
