= Darani-ye Sofla =

Village in Hamadan province, Iran

Darani-ye Sofla Persian: داراني سفلي
- Village
- Location within Iran
- Coordinates: 34°29′56″N 48°24′45″E
- Country: Iran
- Province: Hamadan
- County: Tuyserkan
- District: Central
- Rural District: Hayaquq-e Nabi

Population (2016)
  - Total: 430
- Time zone: UTC+3:30 (IRST)

Darani-ye Sofla (Persian: داراني سفلي) (Note: Also romanized as Dārānī-ye Soflá; also known as Dārān-e Pā’īn, Dārāni Pāīn, and Dārānī-ye Pā’īn) is a village in Hayaquq-e Nabi Rural District of the Central District in Tuyserkan County, Hamadan province, Iran.

== Demographics ==
=== Population ===
At the time of the 2006 National Census, the village's population was 607 in 144 households. The following census in 2011 counted 570 people in 157 households. The 2016 census measured the population of the village as 430 people in 146 households.
