= Hajjiabad, Tuyserkan =

Village in Hamadan province, Iran

Hajjiabad Persian: حاجي اباد
- Village
- Location within Iran
- Coordinates: 34°37′19″N 48°15′49″E
- Country: Iran
- Province: Hamadan
- County: Tuyserkan
- District: Central
- Rural District: Khorram Rud

Population (2016)
  - Total: 630
- Time zone: UTC+3:30 (IRST)

Hajjiabad (Persian: حاجي اباد) (Note: Also romanized as Hājīābād and Ḩājjīābād) is a village in Khorram Rud Rural District of the Central District in Tuyserkan County, Hamadan province, Iran.

== Demographics ==
=== Population ===
At the time of the 2006 National Census, the village's population was 665 in 182 households. The following census in 2011 counted 722 people in 243 households. The 2016 census measured the population of the village as 630 people in 233 households.
