= Bujan, Hamadan =

Village in Hamadan province, Iran

Bujan Persian: بوجان
- Village
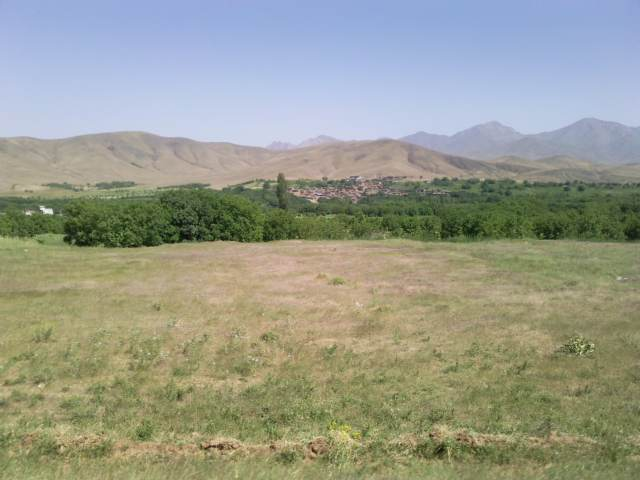
- The village of Bujan

- Location within Iran
- Coordinates: 34°39′26″N 48°21′28″E
- Country: Iran
- Province: Hamadan
- County: Tuyserkan
- District: Central
- Rural District: Korzan Rud

Population (2016)
  - Total: 262
- Time zone: UTC+3:30 (IRST)

Bujan (Persian: بوجان) (Note: Also romanized as Boojan and Būjān) is a village in Korzan Rud Rural District of the Central District in Tuyserkan County, Hamadan province, Iran.

== Demographics ==
=== Population ===
At the time of the 2006 National Census, the village's population was 394 in 118 households. The following census in 2011 counted 335 people in 120 households. The 2016 census measured the population of the village as 262 people in 98 households.
