= Gashani =

Village in Hamadan province, Iran

Gashani Persian: گشاني
- Village
- Location within Iran
- Coordinates: 34°39′38″N 48°23′29″E
- Country: Iran
- Province: Hamadan
- County: Tuyserkan
- District: Central
- Rural District: Korzan Rud

Population (2016)
  - Total: 541
- Time zone: UTC+3:30 (IRST)

Gashani (Persian: گشاني) (Note: Also romanized as Gashānī; also known as Kāshānī) is a village in Korzan Rud Rural District of the Central District in Tuyserkan County, Hamadan province, Iran.

== Demographics ==
=== Population ===
At the time of the 2006 National Census, the village's population was 809 in 229 households. The following census in 2011 counted 689 people in 241 households. The 2016 census measured the population of the village as 541 people in 207 households.
