= Eynabad, Tuyserkan =

Eynabad عين اباد
- Village
- Location within Iran
- Coordinates: 34°33′34″N 48°25′33″E
- Country: Iran
- Province: Hamadan
- County: Tuyserkan
- Bakhsh: Central
- Rural District: Hayaquq-e Nabi

Population (2006)
  - Total: 1,388
- Time zone: UTC+3:30 (IRST)
  - Summer (DST): UTC+4:30 (IRDT)

Eynabad (Persian: عين اباد, also Romanized as ‘Eynābād; also known as Qal‘eh-ye Āqā Beyk) is a village in Hayaquq-e Nabi Rural District, in the Central District of Tuyserkan County, Hamadan Province, Iran. At the 2006 census, its population was 1,388, in 390 families.
