= Mir Razi Artimani =

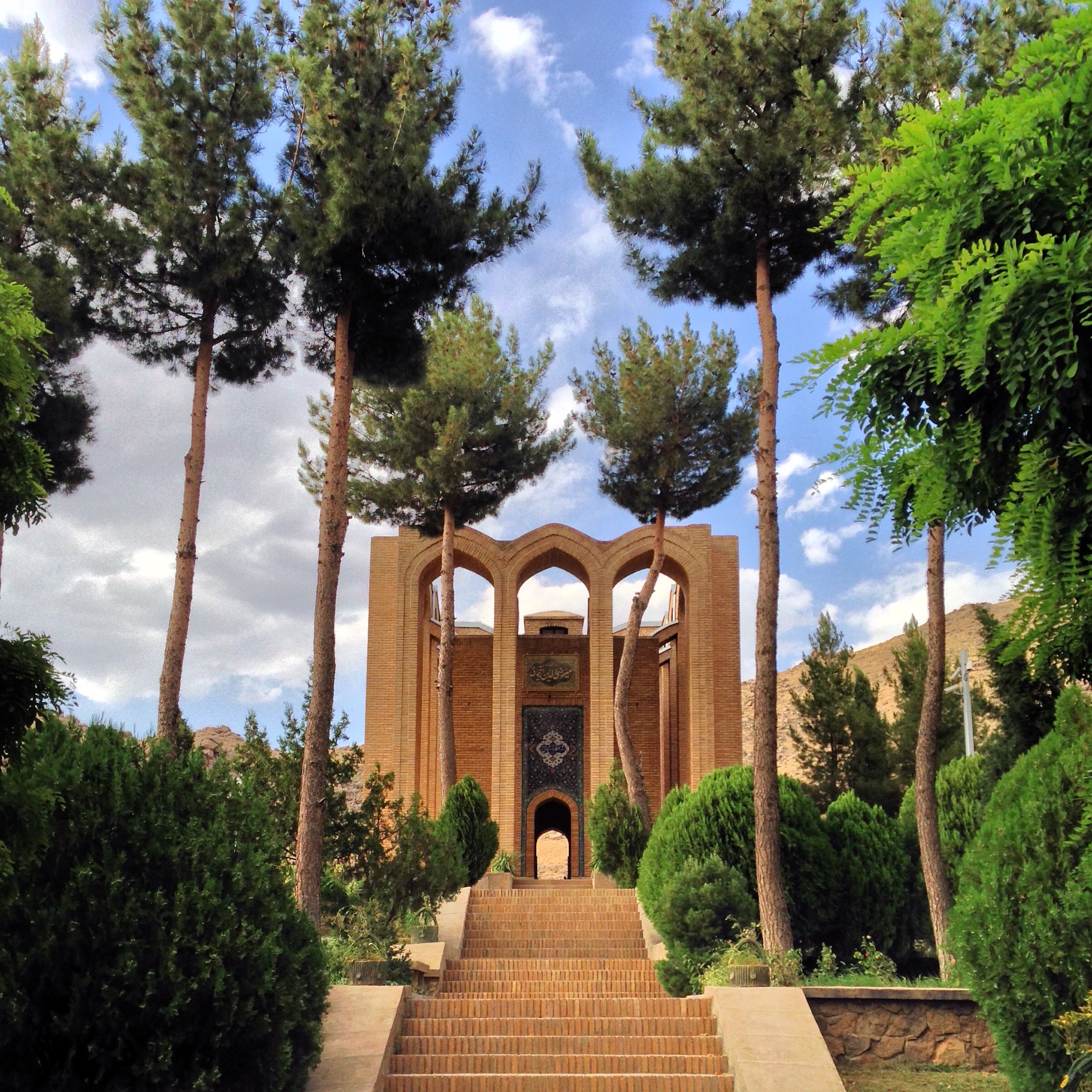
- Mausoleum of Mir Razi Artimani in Tuyserkan
- Born: Artiman, Hamadan province, Safavid Iran
- Died: 1628
- Relatives: Mirza Ebrahim Adham (son)
- Writing career
- Notable works: A divan and two saqi-namehs

Mir Razi Artimani (died 1628) was a poet and mystic in Safavid Iran. He was from a seyyed family in the Artiman village in the Hamadan province. He is the author of a divan (collection of poems) and two saqi-namehs, the latter of which he is best known for. His work was first published in 1967/68 by Mohammad-Ali Emami.

He was the father of the poet Mirza Ebrahim Adham who immigrated to India.

== Sources ==
- Rofougaran, Morvarid (2025). "رضی الدینِ آرتیمانی". The Great Islamic Encyclopaedia (in Persian).
