= Sang-e Sefid, Tuyserkan =

Village in Hamadan province, Iran

Sang-e Sefid Persian: سنگ سفيد
- Village
- Location within Iran
- Coordinates: 34°28′25″N 48°31′26″E
- Country: Iran
- Province: Hamadan
- County: Tuyserkan
- District: Central
- Rural District: Seyyed Shahab

Population (2016)
  - Total: 116
- Time zone: UTC+3:30 (IRST)

Sang-e Sefid (Persian: سنگ سفيد) (Note: Also romanized as Sang-e Safīd , Sang-e Sefīd, and Sang-i-Safīd) is a village in Seyyed Shahab Rural District of the Central District in Tuyserkan County, Hamadan province, Iran.

== Demographics ==
=== Population ===
At the time of the 2006 National Census, the village's population was 211 in 58 households. The following census in 2011 counted 171 people in 48 households. The 2016 census measured the population of the village as 116 people in 39 households.
