= Oshtormel =

Oshtormel or Oshtormal or Oshtor Mol (Persian: اشترمل) may refer to:

- Oshtormel, Hamadan
- Oshtormel, Kurdistan
