= Jijan Kuh =

Village in Hamadan province, Iran

Jijan Kuh Persian: جيجان كوه
- Village
- Location within Iran
- Coordinates: 34°28′52″N 48°30′25″E
- Country: Iran
- Province: Hamadan
- County: Tuyserkan
- District: Central
- Rural District: Seyyed Shahab

Population (2016)
  - Total: 1,365
- Time zone: UTC+3:30 (IRST)

Jijan Kuh (Persian: جيجان كوه) (Note: Also romanized as Jījān Kūh; also known as Jeyḩān Kūh, Jījeyān Kūh, Jījīān Kūh, and Jijiyan Kooh) is a village in Seyyed Shahab Rural District of the Central District in Tuyserkan County, Hamadan province, Iran.

== Demographics ==
=== Population ===
At the time of the 2006 National Census, the village's population was 1,450 in 323 households. The following census in 2011 counted 1,468 people in 420 households. The 2016 census measured the population of the village as 1,365 people in 421 households.
