= Sanjuzan =

Village in Hamadan province, Iran

Sanjuzan Persian: سنجوزان
- Village
- Location within Iran
- Coordinates: 34°39′22″N 48°23′38″E
- Country: Iran
- Province: Hamadan
- County: Tuyserkan
- District: Central
- Rural District: Korzan Rud

Population (2016)
  - Total: 174
- Time zone: UTC+3:30 (IRST)

Sanjuzan (Persian: سنجوزان) (Note: Also romanized as Sanjowzān and Sanjūzān; also known as Sachūzān) is a village in Korzan Rud Rural District of the Central District in Tuyserkan County, Hamadan province, Iran.

== Demographics ==
=== Population ===
At the time of the 2006 National Census, the village's population was 310 in 93 households. The following census in 2011 counted 231 people in 89 households. The 2016 census measured the population of the village as 174 people in 79 households.
