= Qaleh-ye Sheykh, Hamadan =

Qaleh-ye Sheykh قلعه شيخ
- Village
- Location within Iran
- Coordinates: 34°32′36″N 48°23′05″E
- Country: Iran
- Province: Hamadan
- County: Tuyserkan
- Bakhsh: Central
- Rural District: Hayaquq-e Nabi

Population (2006)
  - Total: 122
- Time zone: UTC+3:30 (IRST)
  - Summer (DST): UTC+4:30 (IRDT)

Qaleh-ye Sheykh (Persian: قلعه شيخ, also Romanized as Qal`eh-ye Sheykh or Qal‘eh Shaikh) is a village in Hayaquq-e Nabi Rural District, in the Central District of Tuyserkan County, Hamadan Province, Iran. At the 2006 census, its population was 122, in 36 families.
