= Abarlaq-e Sofla =

Abarlaq-e Sofla ابرلاق سفلي
- Village
- Location within Iran
- Coordinates: 34°40′17″N 48°13′42″E
- Country: Iran
- Province: Hamadan
- County: Tuyserkan
- Bakhsh: Central
- Rural District: Khorram Rud

Population (2006)
  - Total: 136
- Time zone: UTC+3:30 (IRST)
  - Summer (DST): UTC+4:30 (IRDT)

Abarlaq-e Sofla (Persian: ابرلاق سفلي, also Romanized as Abarlāq-e Soflá; also known as Abarlāq-e Pā’īn, Avala Pāīn, and Avaleh-ye Pā’īn) is a village in Khorram Rud Rural District, in the Central District of Tuyserkan County, Hamadan Province, Iran. At the 2006 census, its population was 136, in 38 families.
