= Abarlaq-e Olya =

Abarlaq-e Olya ابرلاق عليا
- Village
- Location within Iran
- Coordinates: 34°41′30″N 48°14′13″E
- Country: Iran
- Province: Hamadan
- County: Tuyserkan
- Bakhsh: Central
- Rural District: Khorram Rud

Population (2006)
  - Total: 167
- Time zone: UTC+3:30 (IRST)
  - Summer (DST): UTC+4:30 (IRDT)

Abarlaq-e Olya (Persian: ابرلاق عليا, also Romanized as Abarlāq-e ‘Olyā; also known as Abarlāq-e Bālā, Avala Bāla, and Avaleh-ye Bālā) is a village in Khorram Rud Rural District, in the Central District of Tuyserkan County, Hamadan Province, Iran. At the 2006 census, its population was 167, in 36 families.
