= Malicheh, Tuyserkan =

Malicheh ماليچه
- Village
- Location within Iran
- Coordinates: 34°28′57″N 48°22′23″E
- Country: Iran
- Province: Hamadan
- County: Tuyserkan
- Bakhsh: Central
- Rural District: Hayaquq-e Nabi

Population (2006)
  - Total: 581
- Time zone: UTC+3:30 (IRST)
  - Summer (DST): UTC+4:30 (IRDT)

Malicheh (Persian: ماليچه, also Romanized as Mālīcheh; also known as Mālcha and Mālcheh) is a village in Hayaquq-e Nabi Rural District, in the Central District of Tuyserkan County, Hamadan Province, Iran. At the 2006 census, its population was 581, in 147 families.
