= Arikan =

Village in Hamadan province, Iran

Arikan Persian: اريكان
- Village
- Location within Iran
- Coordinates: 34°31′55″N 48°21′38″E
- Country: Iran
- Province: Hamadan
- County: Tuyserkan
- District: Central
- Rural District: Hayaquq-e Nabi

Population (2016)
  - Total: 466
- Time zone: UTC+3:30 (IRST)

Arikan (Persian: اريكان) (Note: Also romanized as Ārīkān) is a village in Hayaquq-e Nabi Rural District of the Central District in Tuyserkan County, Hamadan province, Iran.

== Demographics ==
=== Population ===
At the time of the 2006 National Census, the village's population was 515 in 132 households. The following census in 2011 counted 497 people in 158 households. The 2016 census measured the population of the village as 466 people in 155 households.
