= Faryazan =

Village in Hamadan province, Iran

Faryazan Persian: فريازان
- Village
- Location within Iran
- Coordinates: 34°31′15″N 48°19′58″E
- Country: Iran
- Province: Hamadan
- County: Tuyserkan
- District: Central
- Rural District: Hayaquq-e Nabi

Population (2016)
  - Total: 1,185
- Time zone: UTC+3:30 (IRST)

Faryazan (Persian: فريازان) (Note: Also romanized as Faryāzān; also known as Fīryāzān) is a village in Hayaquq-e Nabi Rural District of the Central District in Tuyserkan County, Hamadan province, Iran.

== Demographics ==
=== Population ===
At the time of the 2006 National Census, the village's population was 1,401 in 352 households. The following census in 2011 counted 1,322 people in 385 households. The 2016 census measured the population of the village as 1,185 people in 380 households.
