= Kolanjan =

Village in Hamadan province, Iran

Kolanjan Persian: كلنجان
- Village
- Location within Iran
- Coordinates: 34°35′40″N 48°23′33″E
- Country: Iran
- Province: Hamadan
- County: Tuyserkan
- District: Central
- Rural District: Korzan Rud

Population (2016)
  - Total: 114
- Time zone: UTC+3:30 (IRST)

Kolanjan (Persian: كلنجان) (Note: Also romanized as Kalanjan, Kolanjān, and Kolenjān) is a village in Korzan Rud Rural District of the Central District in Tuyserkan County, Hamadan province, Iran.

== Demographics ==
=== Population ===
At the time of the 2006 National Census, the village's population was 165 in 60 households. The following census in 2011 counted 118 people in 51 households. The 2016 census measured the population of the village as 114 people in 49 households.
