= Kheyrabad, Tuyserkan =

Village in Hamadan province, Iran

Kheyrabad Persian: خير آباد
- Village
- Location within Iran
- Coordinates: 34°27′55″N 48°33′58″E
- Country: Iran
- Province: Hamadan
- County: Tuyserkan
- District: Central
- Rural District: Seyyed Shahab

Population (2016)
  - Total: 154
- Time zone: UTC+3:30 (IRST)

Kheyrabad (Persian: خير آباد) (Note: Also romanized as Kheyrābād) is a village in Seyyed Shahab Rural District of the Central District in Tuyserkan County, Hamadan province, Iran.

== Demographics ==
=== Population ===
At the time of the 2006 National Census, the village's population was 267 in 77 households. The following census in 2011 counted 228 people in 73 households. The 2016 census measured the population of the village as 154 people in 56 households.
