= Baba Pir =

Village in Hamadan province, Iran

Baba Pir Persian: باباپير
- Village
- Location within Iran
- Coordinates: 34°36′51″N 48°24′09″E
- Country: Iran
- Province: Hamadan
- County: Tuyserkan
- District: Central
- Rural District: Korzan Rud

Population (2016)
  - Total: 946
- Time zone: UTC+3:30 (IRST)

Baba Pir (Persian: باباپير) (Note: Also romanized as Bābā Pīr) is a village in, and the capital of, Korzan Rud Rural District in the Central District of Tuyserkan County, Hamadan province, Iran.

== Demographics ==
=== Population ===
At the time of the 2006 National Census, the village's population was 1,502 in 448 households. The following census in 2011 counted 1,194 people in 427 households. The 2016 census measured the population of the village as 946 people in 408 households, the most populous in its rural district.
