= Termianak =

Village in Hamadan province, Iran

Termianak Persian: ترميانك
- Village
- Location within Iran
- Coordinates: 34°37′55″N 48°10′25″E
- Country: Iran
- Province: Hamadan
- County: Tuyserkan
- District: Central
- Rural District: Khorram Rud

Population (2016)
  - Total: 356
- Time zone: UTC+3:30 (IRST)

Termianak (Persian: ترميانك) (Note: Also romanized as Tarmiyanak, Termīānak, Tormeyānak, and Tormīānk) is a village in Khorram Rud Rural District of the Central District in Tuyserkan County, Hamadan province, Iran.

== Demographics ==
=== Population ===
At the time of the 2006 National Census, the village's population was 475 in 113 households. The following census in 2011 counted 414 people in 115 households. The 2016 census measured the population of the village as 356 people in 111 households.
