= Badri Tarvij =

Iranian female poet (1932–2017)

- بدری ترویج
- Born: October 7, 1932; Mashhad, Iran
- Died: February 2, 2017 (aged 84); New York City, United States of America
- Citizenship: Iranian
- Occupation: Poet
- Children: Nasrin Bataghva
- Writing career
- Pen name: Badri
- Language: Persian
- Years active: 1942–2017
- Genres: Ghazal, masnavi, do-bayti, qasida, robaee, and modern poetry
- Subject: Persian poetry
- Notable works: Haleh (1975; lit. Halo); Beh jormi keh zan shodam (1996; lit. For the offense of being a woman); Saqi-nameh (2003; lit. Letter to the cupbearer)

Badri Tarvij (بدری ترویج; born October 7, 1932 in Mashhad; died February 2, 2017 in New York City) was an Iranian poet. She mainly wrote in the literary genre of ghazal in Persian. She started poetry at the age of ten. Her poems were published in Iranian newspapers in the 1970s. Later, she published two anthologies titled Haleh (1975; lit. Halo) and Beh jormi keh zan shodam (1996; lit. For the offense of being a woman). In 2003 in New York City, she wrote a saqi-nameh (lit. letter to the cupbearer) in the genre of masnavi, which is claimed to be the only saqi-nameh ever written by a female poet. Beside above genres, she wrote poems in do-bayti, qasida, robaee, and modern poetry.

== Sources ==
- Arzhang (October 2025). "بدری ترویج، شاعری از قلب خراسان" [Badri Tarvij, a poet from the heart of Khorasan]. Arzhang (in Persian). mahnameh-arzhang.com.
- Ettelaat (May 26, 1975). "هاله (Haleh)" [Halo] (in Persian). Tehran: Ettela'at.
- Gohari, Ali; Nemati, Saeed (March 2026). "بدری، تنها شاعر زن صاحب ساقی نامه" [Badri, the only female poet who owns a saqi-nameh]. Arzhang (in lang). mahnameh-arzhang.com.
- Javid, Jahanshah (October 8, 1998). "Badri Tarvij's cries of love, loneliness and life in exile". The Iranian. New York City: Iranian.com.
- Nezami, Parviz (2010). سیر و سفری در گلستان ادب پارسی از سنائی تا توللی [A journey in the garden of Persian literature from Sanaee to Tavallali] (in Persian). Iran: Gutenberg. ISBN 9789647619592.
