= Showqabad, Hamadan =

Village in Hamadan province, Iran

Showqabad Persian: شوق اباد
- Village
- Location within Iran
- Coordinates: 34°24′58″N 48°31′45″E
- Country: Iran
- Province: Hamadan
- County: Tuyserkan
- District: Central
- Rural District: Seyyed Shahab

Population (2016)
  - Total: 197
- Time zone: UTC+3:30 (IRST)

Showqabad (Persian: شوق اباد) (Note: Also romanized as Showqābād; also known as ‘Eshqābād) is a village in Seyyed Shahab Rural District of the Central District in Tuyserkan County, Hamadan province, Iran.

== Demographics ==
=== Population ===
At the time of the 2006 National Census, the village's population was 217 in 47 households. The following census in 2011 counted 212 people in 60 households. The 2016 census measured the population of the village as 197 people in 59 households.
