= Shahrestaneh =

Shahrestaneh or Shahristaneh (Persian: شهرستانك) may refer to:

- Shahrestaneh, Hamadan
- Shahrestaneh, Razavi Khorasan
- Shahrestaneh Rural District, in Razavi Khorasan Province
