= Kondowr =

Kondowr (Persian: كندور) may refer to:

- Kondowr, Hamadan
- Kondowr, Razavi Khorasan
