= Vardavard-e Sofla =

Village in Hamadan province, Iran

Vardavard-e Sofla Persian: ورداوردسفلي
- Village
- Location within Iran
- Coordinates: 34°42′01″N 48°17′38″E
- Country: Iran
- Province: Hamadan
- County: Tuyserkan
- District: Central
- Rural District: Khorram Rud

Population (2016)
  - Total: 132
- Time zone: UTC+3:30 (IRST)

Vardavard-e Sofla (Persian: ورداوردسفلي) (Note: Also romanized as Vardāvard-e Soflá; also known as Var Dāvad-e Soflá, Vardāvar-e Pā’īn, and Vardood Sofla) is a village in Khorram Rud Rural District of the Central District in Tuyserkan County, Hamadan province, Iran.

== Demographics ==
=== Population ===
At the time of the 2006 National Census, the village's population was 185 in 54 households. The following census in 2011 counted 140 people in 49 households. The 2016 census measured the population of the village as 132 people in 54 households.
