= Kondor, Hamadan =

Village in Hamadan province, Iran

Kondor Persian: كندر
- Village
- Location within Iran
- Coordinates: 34°41′30″N 48°16′12″E
- Country: Iran
- Province: Hamadan
- County: Tuyserkan
- District: Central
- Rural District: Khorram Rud

Population (2016)
  - Total: 1,171
- Time zone: UTC+3:30 (IRST)

Kondor (Persian: كندر) (Note: Also romanized as Kandor; also known as Kandū, Kondowr, Kuneh, and Qal‘eh-ye Kondor) is a village in Khorram Rud Rural District of the Central District in Tuyserkan County, Hamadan province, Iran.

== Demographics ==
=== Population ===
At the time of the 2006 National Census, the village's population was 1,289 in 302 households. The following census in 2011 counted 1,318 people in 348 households. The 2016 census measured the population of the village as 1,171 people in 397 households.
