= Shahrestaneh, Hamadan =

Village in Hamadan province, Iran

Shahrestaneh Persian: شهرستانه
- Village
- Location within Iran
- Coordinates: 34°42′14″N 48°21′44″E
- Country: Iran
- Province: Hamadan
- County: Tuyserkan
- District: Central
- Rural District: Khorram Rud

Population (2016)
  - Total: 440
- Time zone: UTC+3:30 (IRST)

Shahrestaneh (Persian: شهرستانه) (Note: Also romanized as Shahrestāneh) is a village in Khorram Rud Rural District of the Central District in Tuyserkan County, Hamadan province, Iran.

== Demographics ==
=== Population ===
At the time of the 2006 National Census, the village's population was 888 in 231 households. The following census in 2011 counted 694 people in 229 households. The 2016 census measured the population of the village as 440 people in 173 households.
