= Gonbaleh =

Gonbaleh (Persian: گنبله) may refer to:

- Gonbaleh, Asadabad
- Gonbaleh, Tuyserkan
