= Qolqol, Hamadan =

Village in Hamadan province, Iran

Qolqol Persian: قلقل
- Village
- Location within Iran
- Coordinates: 34°37′14″N 48°14′22″E
- Country: Iran
- Province: Hamadan
- County: Tuyserkan
- District: Central
- Rural District: Khorram Rud

Population (2016)
  - Total: 1,212
- Time zone: UTC+3:30 (IRST)

Qolqol (Persian: قلقل) (Note: Also romanized as Qol Qol) is a village in Khorram Rud Rural District of the Central District in Tuyserkan County, Hamadan province, Iran.

== Demographics ==
=== Population ===
At the time of the 2006 National Census, the village's population was 1,412 in 345 households. The following census in 2011 counted 1,430 people in 412 households. The 2016 census measured the population of the village as 1,212 people in 387 households, the most populous in its rural district.
