= Oshtormel, Hamadan =

Village in Hamadan province, Iran

Oshtormel Persian: اشترمل
- Village
- Location within Iran
- Coordinates: 34°28′10″N 48°29′53″E
- Country: Iran
- Province: Hamadan
- County: Tuyserkan
- District: Central
- Rural District: Seyyed Shahab

Population (2016)
  - Total: 1,774
- Time zone: UTC+3:30 (IRST)

Oshtormel (Persian: اشترمل) (Note: Also romanized as Oshtor Mol) is a village in Seyyed Shahab Rural District of the Central District in Tuyserkan County, Hamadan province, Iran.

== Demographics ==
=== Population ===
At the time of the 2006 National Census, the village's population was 1,891 in 475 households. The following census in 2011 counted 1,940 people in 560 households. The 2016 census measured the population of the village as 1,774 people in 537 households.
