= Bakhtiarabad =

Bakhtiarabad may refer to:

- Qaleh-ye Bakhtiar, Chaharmahal and Bakhtiari, a village in Iran
- Bukhtiarabad Domki, a town in Pakistan
