= Qolqol =

Qolqol or Qol Qol (Persian: قلقل) may refer to:

- Qolqol, Hamadan, a village in Tuyserkan County, Hamadan province
- Qolqol Rud Rural District, an administrative division of Tuyserkan County, Hamadan province
