= Seyyed Shahab, Hamadan =

Village in Hamadan province, Iran

Seyyed Shahab Persian: سيدشهاب
- Village
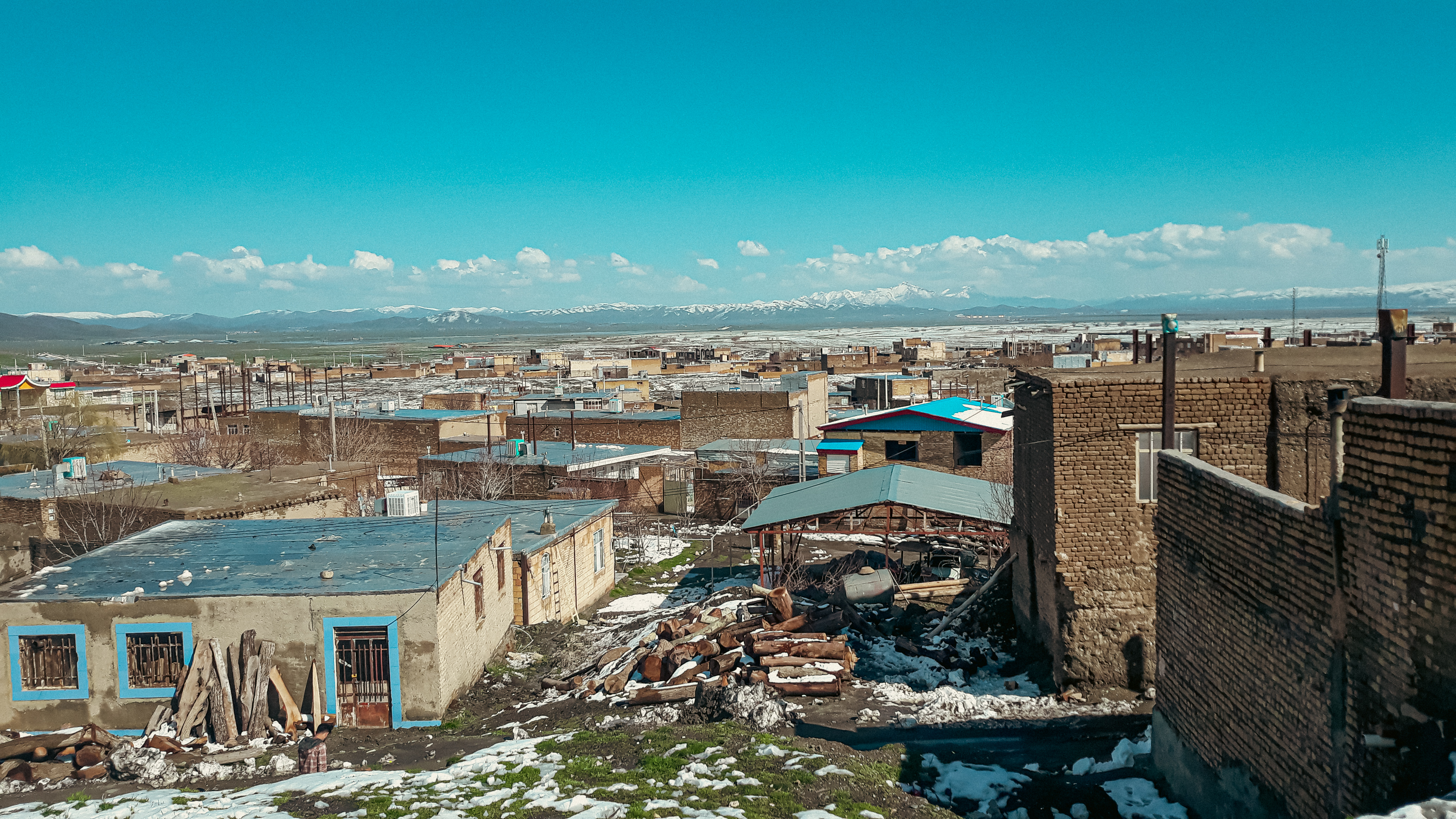
- The village of Seyyed Shahab

- Location within Iran
- Coordinates: 34°26′21″N 48°31′27″E
- Country: Iran
- Province: Hamadan
- County: Tuyserkan
- District: Central
- Rural District: Seyyed Shahab

Population (2016)
  - Total: 3,408
- Time zone: UTC+3:30 (IRST)

Seyyed Shahab (Persian: سيدشهاب) (Note: Also romanized as Seyyed Shahāb; also known as Saīd Shahāb) is a village in, and the capital of, Seyyed Shahab Rural District in the Central District of Tuyserkan County, Hamadan province, Iran.

== Demographics ==
=== Population ===
At the time of the 2006 National Census, the village's population was 2,933 in 649 households. The following census in 2011 counted 3,215 people in 949 households. The 2016 census measured the population of the village as 3,408 people in 1,026 households, the most populous in its rural district.
