= Vardavard-e Olya =

Village in Hamadan province, Iran

Vardavard-e Olya Persian: ورداوردعليا
- Village
- Location within Iran
- Coordinates: 34°42′12″N 48°18′55″E
- Country: Iran
- Province: Hamadan
- County: Tuyserkan
- District: Central
- Rural District: Khorram Rud

Population (2016)
  - Total: 865
- Time zone: UTC+3:30 (IRST)

Vardavard-e Olya (Persian: ورداوردعليا) (Note: Also romanized as Vardāvard-e ‘Olyā; also known as Var Dāvad-e ‘Olyā and Vardāvūd-e Bālā) is a village in Khorram Rud Rural District of the Central District in Tuyserkan County, Hamadan province, Iran.

== Demographics ==
=== Population ===
At the time of the 2006 National Census, the village's population was 1,558 in 371 households. The following census in 2011 counted 1,344 people in 365 households. The 2016 census measured the population of the village as 865 people in 350 households.
