= Malcha =

Malcha may refer to:

- Malha, a neighbourhood in southwest Jerusalem
- Malha Mall, a shopping mall in Malha, Jerusalem
- The Jerusalem Technology Park, also known as Malha Technology Park
- Jerusalem–Malha railway station
- Malicheh, Tuyserkan, a village in Tuyserkan, Iran
- Malcha Stream (Hebrew: Nahal Malcha, Arabic: Wadi al-Malih), a stream in West Bank
- Korean name for matcha, green tea powder
