= Qaleh-ye Amir Khan =

Qaleh-ye Amir Khan or Qaleh Amir Khan (Persian: قلعه امير خان) may refer to:

- Qaleh-ye Amir Khan, Hamadan
- Qaleh-ye Amir Khan, North Khorasan
