= Vardavard-e Vosta =

Village in Hamadan province, Iran

Vardavard-e Vosta Persian: ورداوردوسطي
- Village
- Location within Iran
- Coordinates: 34°42′14″N 48°18′07″E
- Country: Iran
- Province: Hamadan
- County: Tuyserkan
- District: Central
- Rural District: Khorram Rud

Population (2016)
  - Total: 169
- Time zone: UTC+3:30 (IRST)

Vardavard-e Vosta (Persian: ورداوردوسطي) (Note: Also romanized as Vardāvard-e Vosţá; also known as Var Dāvad-e Vasaţī, Vard Āvard-e Vasaţ, Vardāvad-e Vosţá, Vardāvard, Vardāvard-e Vasaţī, and Vardood Vosta) is a village in Khorram Rud Rural District of the Central District in Tuyserkan County, Hamadan province, Iran.

== Demographics ==
=== Population ===
At the time of the 2006 National Census, the village's population was 327 in 93 households. The following census in 2011 counted 222 people in 77 households. The 2016 census measured the population of the village as 169 people in 79 households.
