= Mirza Ebrahim Adham =

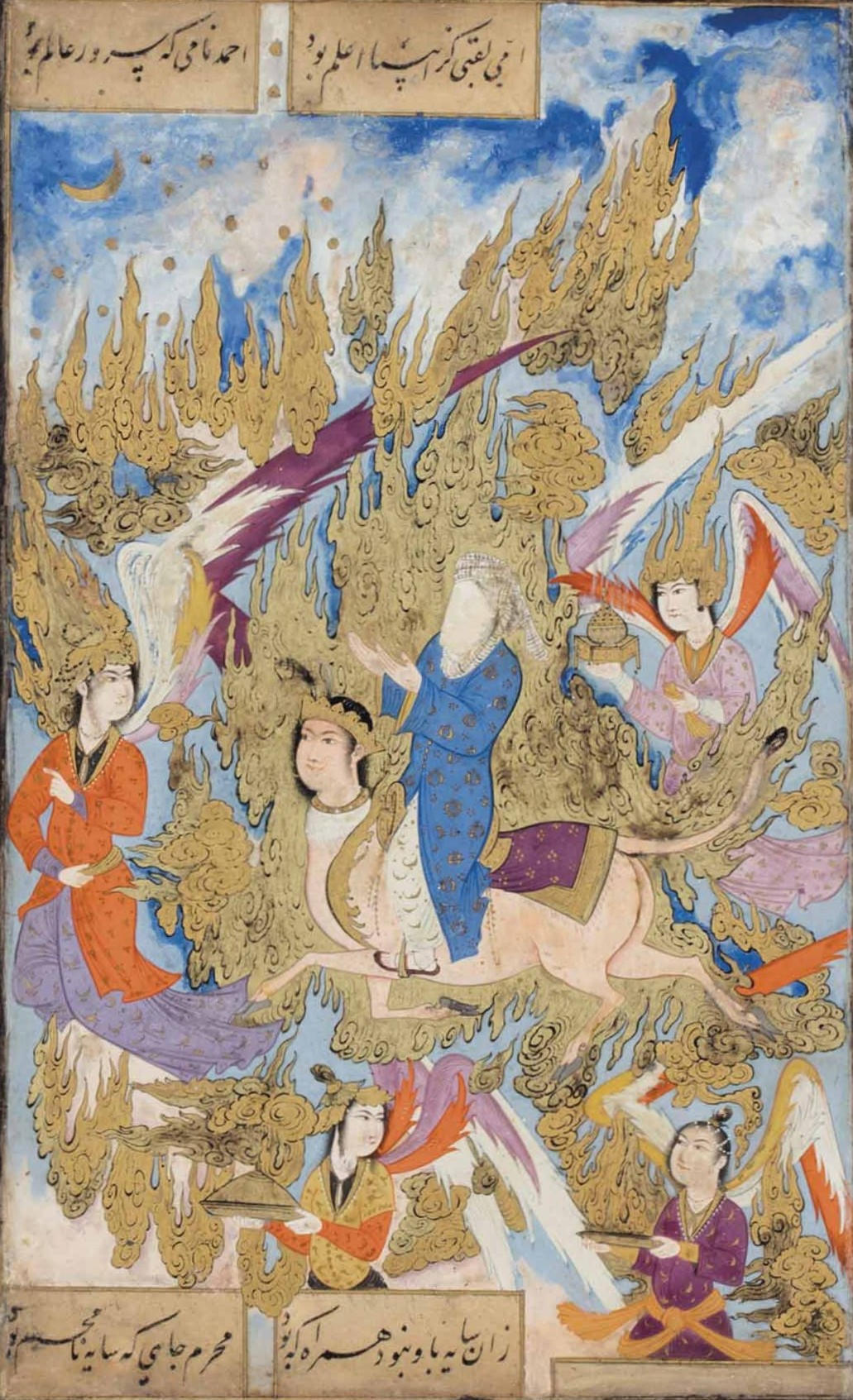
- Depiction of the Mi'raj, school of Reza Abbasi, Isfahan, second quarter of the 17th century. The inscription is a ruba'i (quatrain) praising the Islamic prophet Muhammad by Mirza Ebrahim Adham
- Born: c. 1611; Artiman, Hamadan province, Safavid Iran
- Died: 1650; Shahjahanabad, Mughal Empire
- Spouse: Unnamed Mughal princess
- Parents: Mir Razi Artimani (father); Unnamed Safavid princess (mother)

Mirza Ebrahim Adham (c. 1611–1650) was a poet in Safavid Iran and Mughal India.

He was the son of the poet Mir Razi Artimani and a Safavid princess. He was born in c. 1611 in the Artiman village. Literary and poetic traditions shaped his upbringing. Very little is known about his academic background, other than his time spent studying under Mir Damad. He then immigrated to India, where he became part of Shah Jahan's royal court due to the efforts of the noble Taqarrub Khan. Adham also married a member of the Mughal dynasty, but due to his behaviour, he was imprisoned and eventually died, possibly by execution, in Shahjahanabad in 1650.

== Sources ==
- Arya, Gholamali (2020). "ادهم". The Great Islamic Encyclopaedia (in Persian).
- Rofougaran, Morvarid (2025). "رضی الدینِ آرتیمانی". The Great Islamic Encyclopaedia (in Persian).
- Thackston, Wheeler M. (1983). "Mīrzā Ebrāhīm Adham". In Yarshater, Ehsan (ed.). Encyclopædia Iranica (Online ed.). Encyclopædia Iranica Foundation. ISBN 978-0710090997.
