= Artiman =

Village in Hamadan province, Iran

Artiman Persian: ارتيمان
- Village
- Location within Iran
- Coordinates: 34°34′46″N 48°26′52″E
- Country: Iran
- Province: Hamadan
- County: Tuyserkan
- District: Central
- Rural District: Hayaquq-e Nabi

Population (2016)
  - Total: 1,033
- Time zone: UTC+3:30 (IRST)

Artiman (Persian: ارتيمان) (Note: Also romanized as Ārtīmān; also known as Ārtmān) is a village in Hayaquq-e Nabi Rural District of the Central District in Tuyserkan County, Hamadan province, Iran.

== Demographics ==
=== Population ===
At the time of the 2006 National Census, the village's population was 2,655 in 694 households. The following census in 2011 counted 1,249 people in 417 households. The 2016 census measured the population of the village as 1,033 people in 330 households.
