= Tuyserkan =

City in Hamadan province, Iran

Tuyserkan Persian: تویسرکان
- City
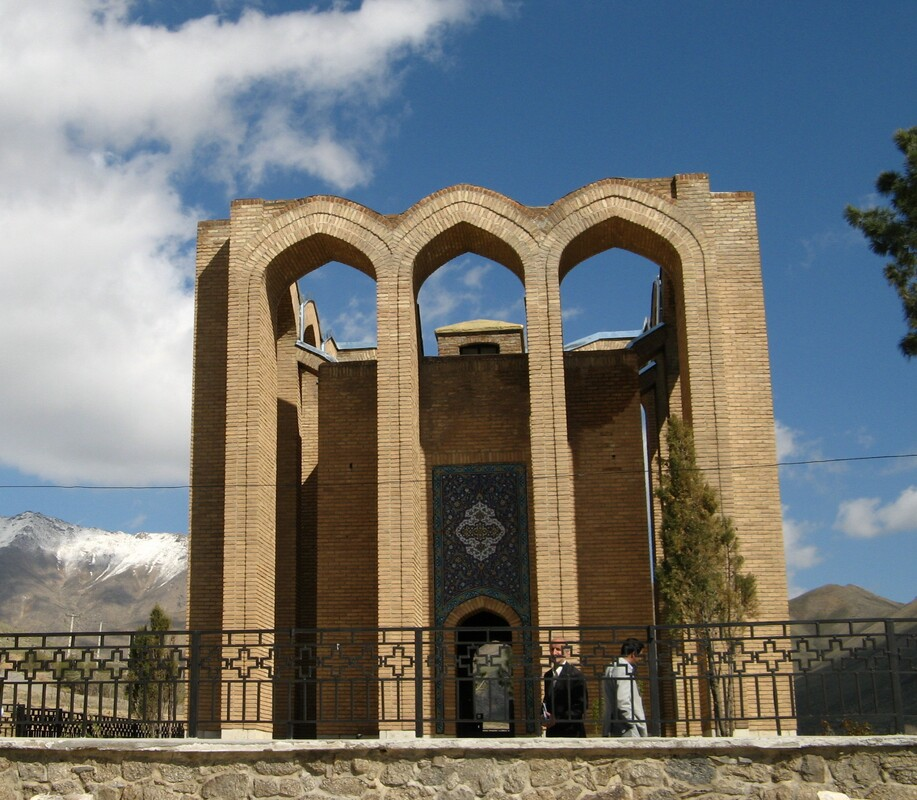
- The Mir Razi mausoleum in Tuyserkan

- Location within Iran
- Coordinates: 34°33′10″N 48°26′30″E
- Country: Iran
- Province: Hamadan
- County: Tuyserkan
- District: Central

Population (2016)
  - Total: 50,455
- Time zone: UTC+3:30 (IRST)

Tuyserkan (Persian: تویسرکان) (Note: Also romanized as Tooyserkan, Tūīsarkān, Tūysarkān, and Tūyserkān) is a city in the Central District of Tuyserkan County, Hamadan province, Iran, serving as capital of both the county and the district. Tuyserkan is about 100 km south of Hamadan, in western Iran.

Tuyserkan is famous for the Tomb of the Prophet Habakkuk, a Twelver Shi'ite and Jewish mausoleum believed to entomb the remains of the biblical prophet Habakkuk, who is revered by Jews, Christians, and Muslims as a Biblical prophet who served in the Temple of Solomon, approximately 700 BCE.

== Climate ==
Tuyserkan has a hot-summer Mediterranean climate (Csa) according to the Köppen climate classification.

Climate data for Tooyserkan (elevation:1,783.2 m (5,850 ft), 2003-2010 normals)
| Month | Jan | Feb | Mar | Apr | May | Jun | Jul | Aug | Sep | Oct | Nov | Dec | Year |
|---|---|---|---|---|---|---|---|---|---|---|---|---|---|
| Daily mean °C (°F) | 0.1 (32.2) | 3.1 (37.6) | 8.5 (47.3) | 11.7 (53.1) | 16.3 (61.3) | 22.6 (72.7) | 26.5 (79.7) | 25.8 (78.4) | 21.3 (70.3) | 15.9 (60.6) | 7.9 (46.2) | 3.4 (38.1) | 13.6 (56.5) |
| Average precipitation mm (inches) | 58.0 (2.28) | 60.5 (2.38) | 50.5 (1.99) | 89.0 (3.50) | 33.2 (1.31) | 2.4 (0.09) | 0.4 (0.02) | 2.0 (0.08) | 3.6 (0.14) | 34.0 (1.34) | 68.8 (2.71) | 51.7 (2.04) | 454.1 (17.88) |
Source: IRIMO

== Demographics ==
=== Population ===
At the time of the 2006 National Census, the city's population was 42,520 in 11,802 households. The following census in 2011 counted 44,516 people in 13,727 households. The 2016 census measured the population of the city as 50,455 people in 16,291 households.

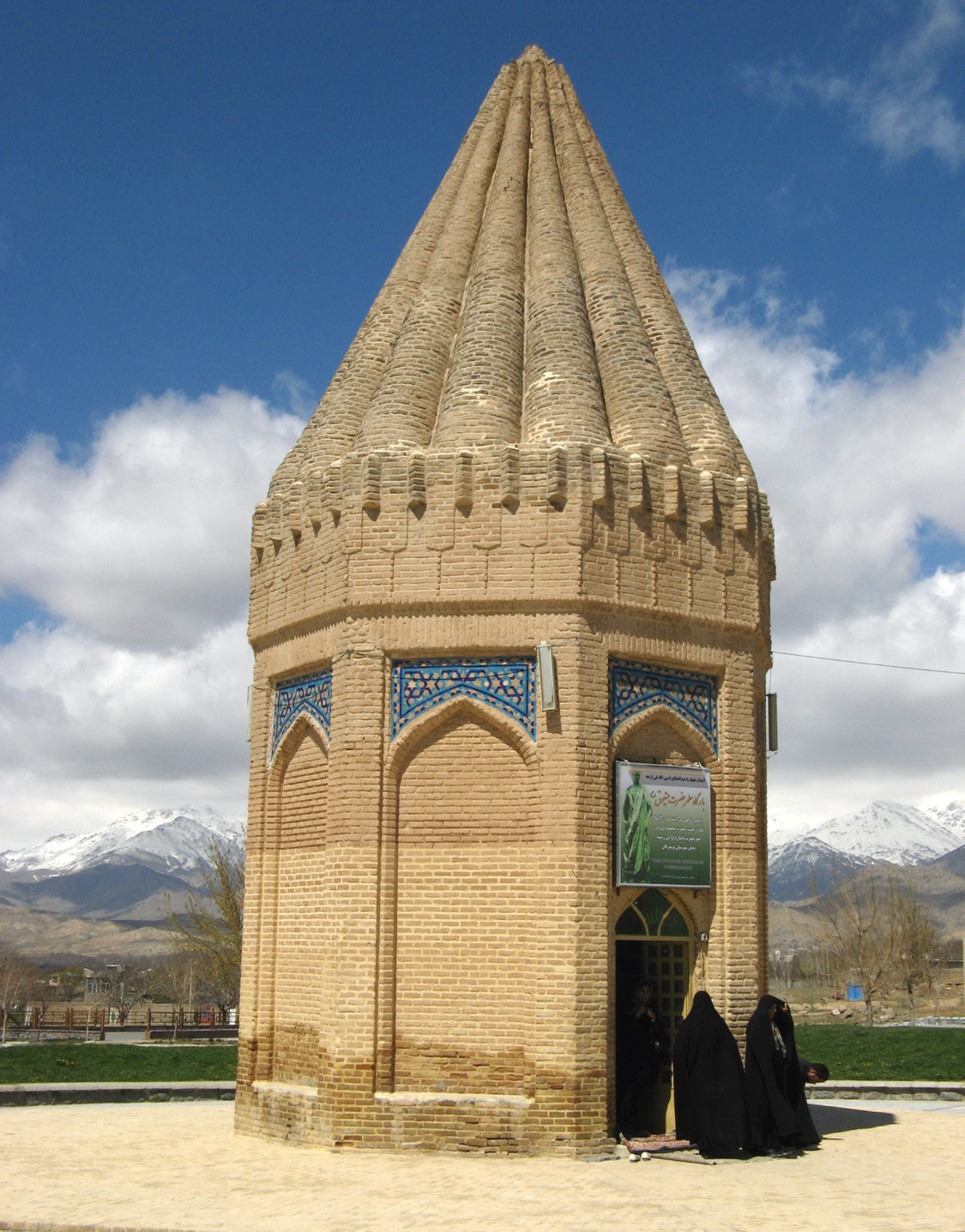
Shrine of Habakkuk in Tuyserkan

== Industries ==
Tuyserkan is a major center for furniture production and wood carving, supported by the abundance of walnut trees in the surrounding region.

== See also ==
Media related to Tuyserkan at Wikimedia Commons
