= Tomb of the Prophet Habakkuk =

13th-century mausoleum in Tuyserkan, Iran

Tomb of Prophet Habakkuk
- آرامگاه حبقوق نبی
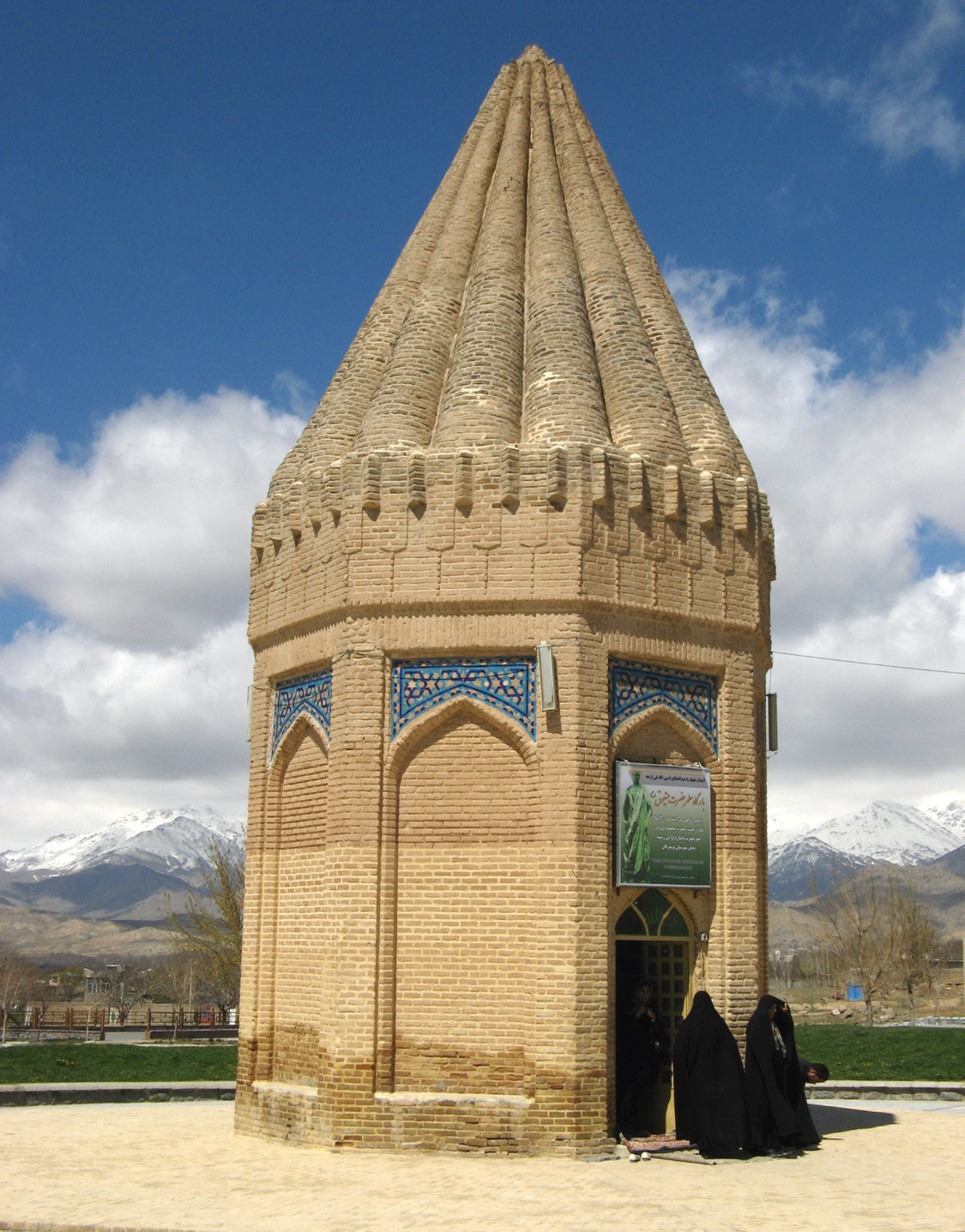

- Location of the complex in Iran

Religion
- Affiliation: Shia (Twelver); Judaism
- Sect: Bani Israil
- Ecclesiastical or organizational status: Mausoleum
- Status: Active

Location
- Location: Tuyserkan, Hamadan Province
- Country: Iran
- Interactive map of Tomb of Prophet Habakkuk
- Coordinates: 34°33′06″N 48°25′48″E

Architecture
- Type: Islamic architecture
- Style: Seljuk
- Completed: 13th century CE

Specifications
- Height (max): 12 m (39 ft)
- Dome: One
- Dome height (outer): 7 m (23 ft)
- Shrine: One: Habakkuk
- Materials: Bricks; plaster; tiles

Iran National Heritage List
- Official name: Tomb of Prophet Habakkuk
- Type: Built
- Designated: 28 April 1974
- Reference no.: 969
- Conservation organization: Cultural Heritage, Handicrafts and Tourism Organization of Iran

The Tomb of Prophet Habakkuk (Persian: آرامگاه حبقوق نبی; Arabic: ضريح حبقوق النبي) (Note: Alternative names include the Habaqoq Nabi Mausoleum (Tuyserkan), the Habaghoqgh Nabi Mausoleum (Tuyserkan), the Ārāmgāh-e Ḩeyqūq Nabī, the Ḥabaquq Mausoleum (Tuyserkan), the Ḥabaquq Tomb (Tuyserkan), the Mausoleum of Ḥabaquq (Tuyserkan), and the Tomb of Ḥabaquq (Tuyserkan).) is a Twelver Shi'ite and Jewish mausoleum located in the city of Tuyserkan, Hamadan province, Iran. The mausoleum is believed to entomb the remains of the biblical prophet Habakkuk, who is revered in some Islamic traditions as one of the Prophets of Bani Israil.

The complex was added to the Iran National Heritage List on 28 April 1974, administered by the Cultural Heritage, Handicrafts and Tourism Organization of Iran.

== History ==
The mausoleum was built in the 13th century, during the Seljuk era. Local traditions claim that the site was originally a pre-Islamic tomb dedicated to Habakkuk. Regardless of claims about the site, the mausoleum has always been revered by both the Shi'ites and the community of Iranian Jews. It has also been restored many times since its first construction.

In 1993/94, illegal looters tunneled under the mausoleum to steal antiques. In later years, these tunnels were investigated during excavation works, and it was discovered that there was a crypt below the mausoleum, where the actual tomb was found. Several legends also describe the discovery of the body of Habakkuk there, which appeared to have been well-preserved.

== Architecture ==
The brick mausoleum is octagonal in shape from the ground up and is 12 metres (39 ft) high. The dome that tops the mausoleum is built in a unique conical formation, that is 7 metres (23 ft) high. The conical roof has been formed out of 16 columns arranged in a circle and leaning towards its center, where they converge, about 5 metres (16 ft) above, to create its peak. On the exterior, Jewish motifs like the Star of David are subtly visible as part of the exterior designs; and inside there are inscriptions in both Hebrew and Persian. The purported grave of Habakkuk is located underneath the dome.

At some point, four towers and a gate existed around the mausoleum. The ruins of such objects were found during archeological excavations.

== Gallery ==
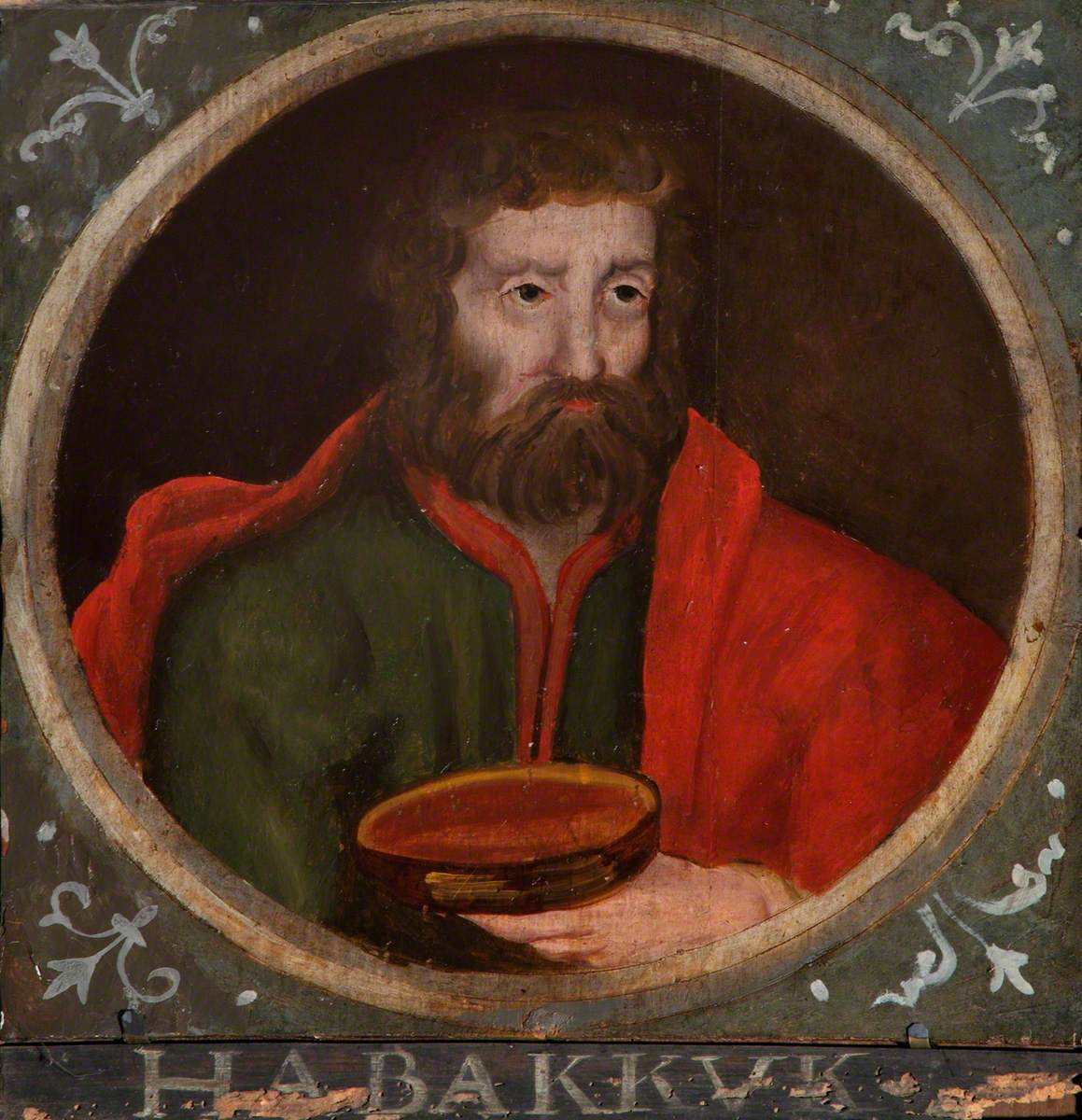
A British illustration of Habakkuk

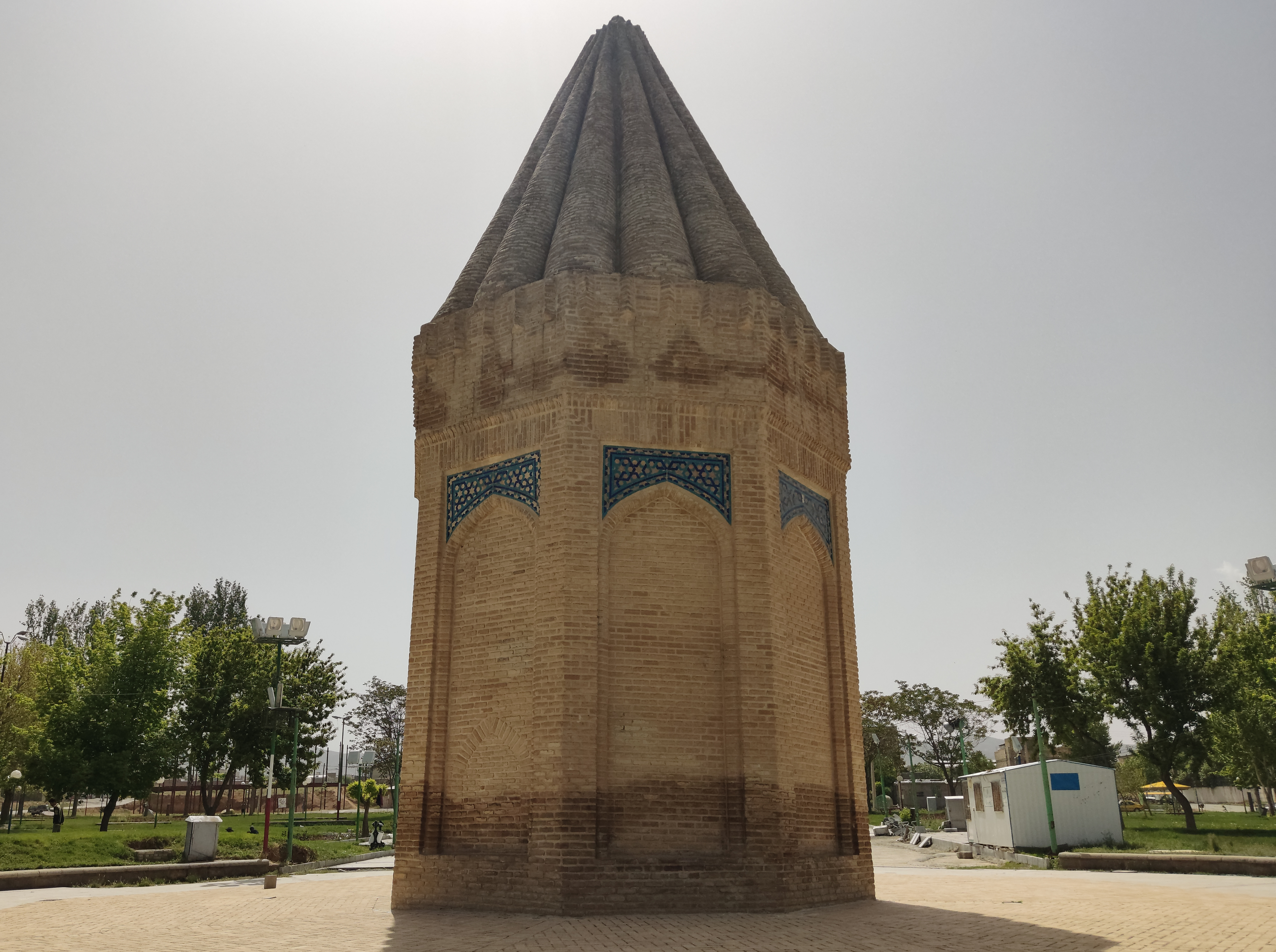
The mausoleum of Habakkuk, in 2022

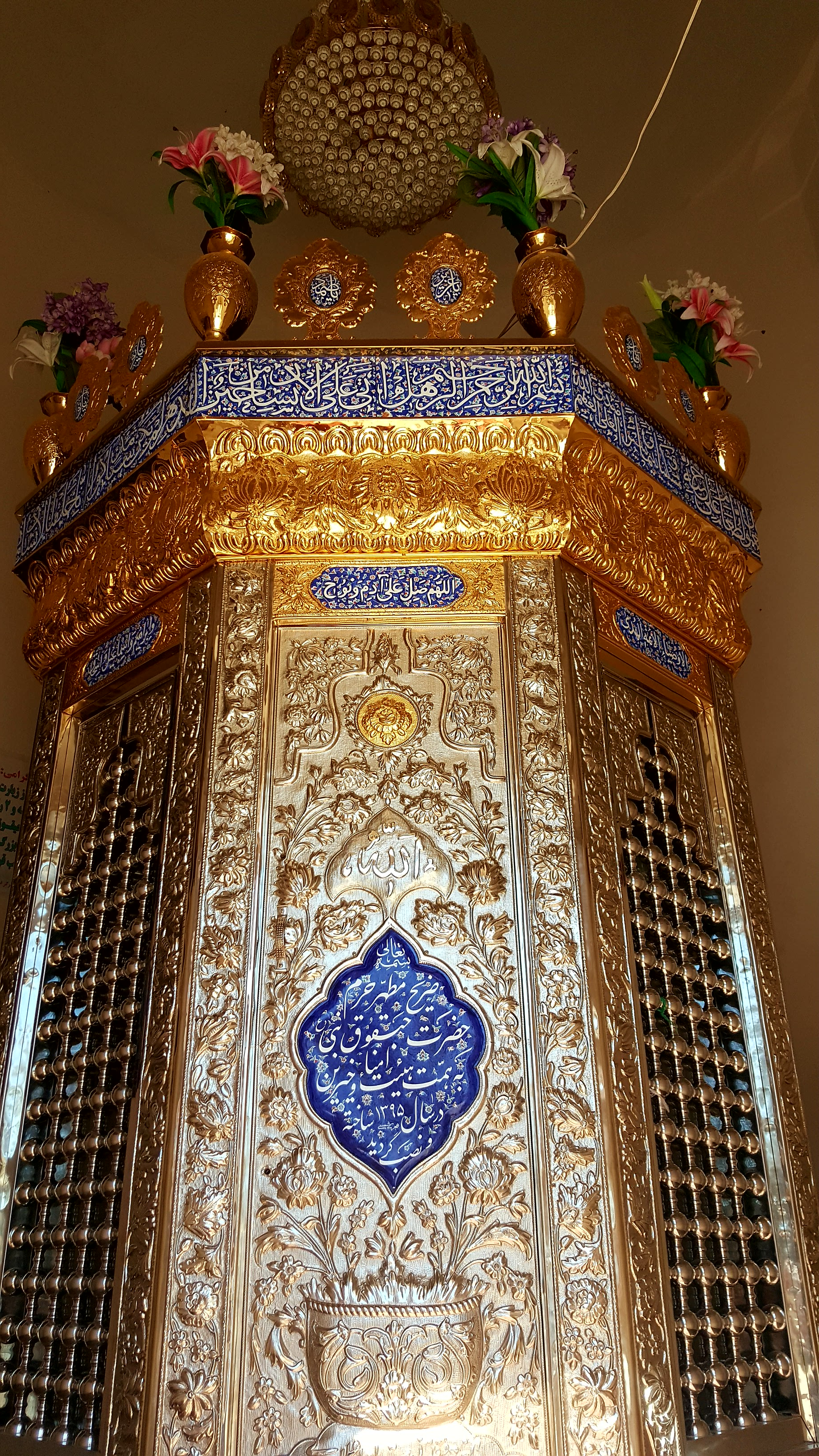
Inside the grave of Habakkuk

== See also ==
- List of burial places of Abrahamic figures
- List of mausoleums in Iran
- Shia Islam in Iran
- History of the Jews in Iran
