= Sarkan =

City in Hamadan province, Iran

Sarkan Persian: سركان
- City
- Location within Iran
- Coordinates: 34°36′06″N 48°26′59″E
- Country: Iran
- Province: Hamadan
- County: Tuyserkan
- District: Central

Population (2016)
  - Total: 4,081
- Time zone: UTC+3:30 (IRST)

Sarkan (Persian: سركان) (Note: Also romanized as Sarkān, Serkan, and Serkān) is a city in the Central District of Tuyserkan County, Hamadan province, Iran.

== Demographics ==
=== Population ===
At the time of the 2006 National Census, the city's population was 4,557 in 1,418 households. The following census in 2011 counted 4,271 people in 1,474 households. The 2016 census measured the population of the city as 4,081 people in 1,492 households.
