= Korzan Rud Rural District =

Rural district in Hamadan province, Iran

Korzan Rud Rural District Persian: دهستان كرزان رود
- Rural District
- Location within Iran
- Coordinates: 34°38′N 48°23′E
- Country: Iran
- Province: Hamadan
- County: Tuyserkan
- District: Central
- Established: 1987
- Capital: Baba Pir

Population (2016)
  - Total: 3,432
- Time zone: UTC+3:30 (IRST)

Korzan Rud Rural District (Persian: دهستان كرزان رود) is in the Central District of Tuyserkan County, Hamadan province, Iran. Its capital is the village of Baba Pir.

== Demographics ==
=== Population ===
At the time of the 2006 National Census, the rural district's population was 5,032 in 1,514 households. There were 4,342 inhabitants in 1,546 households at the following census of 2011. The 2016 census measured the population of the rural district as 3,432 in 1,368 households. The most populous of its 11 villages was Baba Pir, with 946 people.

=== Other villages in the rural district ===
- Arzuvaj
- Baba Pir Ali
- Bujan
- Gashani
- Kolanjan
- Korzan
- Qaleh Nowruz
- Sanjuzan
