= Eynabad, East Azerbaijan =

Eynabad عين اباد
- Village
- Location within Iran
- Coordinates: 37°29′25″N 46°42′56″E
- Country: Iran
- Province: East Azerbaijan
- County: Hashtrud
- Bakhsh: Central
- Rural District: Qaranqu

Population (2006)
  - Total: 62
- Time zone: UTC+3:30 (IRST)
  - Summer (DST): UTC+4:30 (IRDT)

Eynabad (Persian: عين اباد, also Romanized as ‘Eynābād) is a village in Qaranqu Rural District, in the Central District of Hashtrud County, East Azerbaijan Province, Iran. At the 2006 census, its population was 62, in 17 families.
