= Showqabad, North Khorasan =

Showqabad شوق اباد
- Village
- Location within Iran
- Coordinates: 37°16′59″N 58°07′54″E
- Country: Iran
- Province: North Khorasan
- County: Shirvan
- Bakhsh: Central
- Rural District: Howmeh

Population (2006)
  - Total: 100
- Time zone: UTC+3:30 (IRST)
  - Summer (DST): UTC+4:30 (IRDT)

Showqabad (Persian: شوق اباد, also Romanized as Showqābād) is a village in Howmeh Rural District, in the Central District of Shirvan County, North Khorasan Province, Iran. At the 2006 census, its population was 100, in 24 families.
