= Qaleh-ye Sheykh, Lorestan =

Qaleh-ye Sheykh قلعه شيخ
- Village
- Location within Iran
- Coordinates: 33°24′40″N 48°39′01″E
- Country: Iran
- Province: Lorestan
- County: Khorramabad
- Bakhsh: Central
- Rural District: Azna

Population (2006)
  - Total: 83
- Time zone: UTC+3:30 (IRST)
  - Summer (DST): UTC+4:30 (IRDT)

Qaleh-ye Sheykh (Persian: قلعه شيخ, also Romanized as Qal‘eh-ye Sheykh) is a village in Azna Rural District, in the Central District of Khorramabad County, Lorestan Province, Iran. At the 2006 census, its population was 83, in 18 families.
