= Seyyed Shahab, Kermanshah =

Seyyed Shahab سيدشهاب
- Village
- Location within Iran
- Coordinates: 34°35′29″N 47°24′56″E
- Country: Iran
- Province: Kermanshah
- County: Sahneh
- Bakhsh: Dinavar
- Rural District: Dinavar

Population (2006)
  - Total: 92
- Time zone: UTC+3:30 (IRST)
  - Summer (DST): UTC+4:30 (IRDT)

Seyyed Shahab (Persian: سيدشهاب, also Romanized as Seyyed Shahāb) is a village in Dinavar Rural District, Dinavar District, Sahneh County, Kermanshah Province, Iran. At the 2006 census, its population was 92, in 23 families.
