= Shotor Mol, Kurdistan =

Shotor Mol شترمل
- Village
- Location within Iran
- Coordinates: 34°58′35″N 47°01′13″E
- Country: Iran
- Province: Kurdistan
- County: Kamyaran
- Bakhsh: Muchesh
- Rural District: Sursur

Population (2006)
  - Total: 135
- Time zone: UTC+3:30 (IRST)
  - Summer (DST): UTC+4:30 (IRDT)

Shotor Mol (Persian: شترمل, also Romanized as Shotormel; also known as Oshtormel and Ustermil) is a village in Sursur Rural District, Muchesh District, Kamyaran County, Kurdistan Province, Iran. At the 2006 census, its population was 135, in 32 families. The village is populated by Kurds.
