= Qaleh-ye Sheykh, Khuzestan =

Qaleh-ye Sheykh قلعه شيخ
- Village
- Location within Iran
- Coordinates: 31°11′17″N 49°35′07″E
- Country: Iran
- Province: Khuzestan
- County: Ramhormoz
- Bakhsh: Central
- Rural District: Howmeh-ye Sharqi

Population (2006)
  - Total: 224
- Time zone: UTC+3:30 (IRST)
  - Summer (DST): UTC+4:30 (IRDT)

Qaleh-ye Sheykh (Persian: قلعه شيخ, also Romanized as Qal‘eh-ye Sheykh and Qal‘eh Sheykh; also known as Ghal‘eh Sheikh) is a village in Howmeh-ye Sharqi Rural District, in the Central District of Ramhormoz County, Khuzestan Province, Iran. At the 2006 census, its population was 224, in 49 families.
