= Showqabad, Rigan =

Showqabad شوق اباد
- Village
- Location within Iran
- Coordinates: 28°40′08″N 58°58′52″E
- Country: Iran
- Province: Kerman
- County: Rigan
- Bakhsh: Central
- Rural District: Rigan

Population (2006)
  - Total: 389
- Time zone: UTC+3:30 (IRST)
  - Summer (DST): UTC+4:30 (IRDT)

Showqabad (Persian: شوق اباد, also Romanized as Showqābād; also known as Shūkhābād) is a village in Rigan Rural District, in the Central District of Rigan County, Kerman Province, Iran. At the 2006 census, its population was 389, in 73 families.
