= Seyyed Shahab Rural District =

Rural district in Hamadan province, Iran

Seyyed Shahab Rural District Persian: دهستان سيدشهاب
- Rural District
- Location within Iran
- Coordinates: 34°27′N 48°31′E
- Country: Iran
- Province: Hamadan
- County: Tuyserkan
- District: Central
- Established: 1987
- Capital: Seyyed Shahab

Population (2016)
  - Total: 7,854
- Time zone: UTC+3:30 (IRST)

Seyyed Shahab Rural District (Persian: دهستان سيدشهاب) is in the Central District of Tuyserkan County, Hamadan province, Iran. Its capital is the village of Seyyed Shahab.

== Demographics ==
=== Population ===
At the time of the 2006 National Census, the rural district's population was 8,223 in 1,933 households. There were 8,284 inhabitants in 2,402 households at the following census of 2011. The 2016 census measured the population of the rural district as 7,854 in 2,412 households. The most populous of its nine villages was Seyyed Shahab, with 3,408 people.

=== Other villages in the rural district ===
- Badamak
- Dowlai
- Jijan Kuh
- Kheyrabad
- Oshtormel
- Pir Gheyb
- Sang-e Sefid
- Showqabad
