= Saqi-nameh =

Saqi-nameh ("Book of the Cupbearer") is a genre in Persian poetry in which the narrator calls on the cupbearer for wine and a singer for music, using them to ease suffering.

== Sources ==
- Losensky, Paul E. (2009). "Sāqi-nāma". In Yarshater, Ehsan (ed.). Encyclopædia Iranica (Online ed.). Encyclopædia Iranica Foundation. ISBN 978-9004417090.
