= Qaleh-ye Bakhtiar, Chaharmahal and Bakhtiari =

Village in Chaharmahal and Bakhtiari, Iran

Qaleh-ye Bakhtiar قلعه بختيار
- Village
- Location within Iran
- Coordinates: 32°25′27″N 50°16′06″E
- Country: Iran
- Province: Chaharmahal and Bakhtiari
- County: Kuhrang
- Bakhsh: Central
- Rural District: Dasht-e Zarrin

Population (2006)
  - Total: 104
- Time zone: UTC+3:30 (IRST)
  - Summer (DST): UTC+4:30 (IRDT)

Qaleh-ye Bakhtiar (Persian: قلعه بختيار, also Romanized as Qal‘eh-ye Bakhtīār; also known as Bakhtīārābād, Qal‘eh Bakhtīān, Qal‘eh Bakhtyān, and Qal‘eh-ye Bakhtīārī) is a village in Dasht-e Zarrin Rural District, in the Central District of Kuhrang County, Chaharmahal and Bakhtiari Province, Iran. At the 2006 census, its population was 104, in 21 families. The village is populated by Lurs.
