= Hayaquq-e Nabi Rural District =

Rural district in Hamadan province, Iran

Hayaquq-e Nabi Rural District Persian: دهستان حيقوق نبي
- Rural District
- Location within Iran
- Coordinates: 34°34′N 48°25′E
- Country: Iran
- Province: Hamadan
- County: Tuyserkan
- District: Central
- Established: 1987
- Capital: Jafariyeh

Population (2016)
  - Total: 10,169
- Time zone: UTC+3:30 (IRST)

Hayaquq-e Nabi Rural District (Persian: دهستان حيقوق نبي) is in the Central District of Tuyserkan County, Hamadan province, Iran. Its capital is the village of Jafariyeh.

== Demographics ==
=== Population ===
At the time of the 2006 National Census, the rural district's population was 15,699 in 4,139 households. There were 11,805 inhabitants in 3,711 households at the following census of 2011. The 2016 census measured the population of the rural district as 10,169 in 3,551 households. The most populous of its 24 villages was Jafariyeh, with 1,495 people.

=== Other villages in the rural district ===
- Arikan
- Artiman
- Darani-ye Olya
- Darani-ye Sofla
- Emamzadeh Zeyd
- Faryazan
- Mahmudabad
- Mobarakabad
- Qaleh Qazi
- Rud Avar
