= Khorram Rud Rural District (Tuyserkan County) =

Rural district in Hamadan province, Iran

Khorram Rud Rural District Persian: دهستان خرم رود
- Rural District
- Location within Iran
- Coordinates: 34°41′N 48°17′E
- Country: Iran
- Province: Hamadan
- County: Tuyserkan
- District: Central
- Established: 1987
- Capital: Oshtoran

Population (2016)
  - Total: 8,751
- Time zone: UTC+3:30 (IRST)

Khorram Rud Rural District (Persian: دهستان خرم رود) is in the Central District of Tuyserkan County, Hamadan province, Iran. Its capital is the village of Oshtoran.

== Demographics ==
=== Population ===
At the time of the 2006 National Census, the rural district's population was 12,220 in 3,198 households. There were 10,996 inhabitants in 3,332 households at the following census of 2011. The 2016 census measured the population of the rural district as 8,751 in 3,212 households. The most populous of its 21 villages was Qolqol, with 1,212 people.

=== Other villages in the rural district ===
- Hajjiabad
- Kohnush
- Kondor
- Shahrestaneh
- Termianak
- Vardavard-e Olya
- Vardavard-e Sofla
- Vardavard-e Vosta
