= Tuyserkan County =

County in Hamadan province, Iran

Tuyserkan County Persian: شهرستان تویسرکان
- County
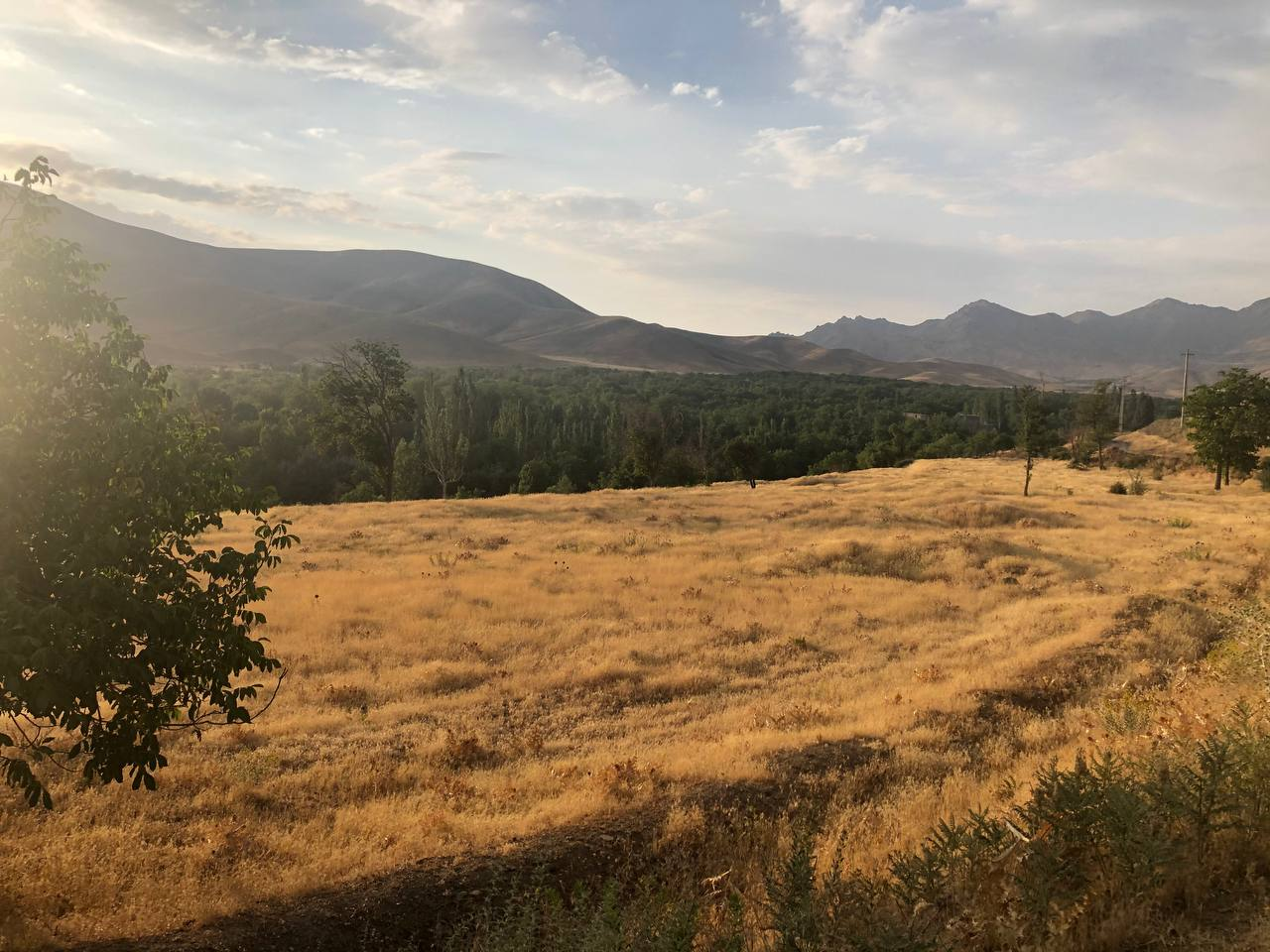
- Landscape near the village of Sistaneh

- Location of Tuyserkan County in Hamadan province (bottom, yellow)

- Location of Hamadan province in Iran
- Coordinates: 34°34′N 48°20′E
- Country: Iran
- Province: Hamadan
- Capital: Tuyserkan
- Districts: Central, Qolqol Rud

Population (2016)
  - Total: 101,666
- Time zone: UTC+3:30 (IRST)

Tuyserkan County (Persian: شهرستان تویسرکان) is in Hamadan province, Iran. Its capital is the city of Tuyserkan.

== Demographics ==
=== Population ===
At the time of the 2006 National Census, the county's population was 109,262 in 28,917 households. The following census in 2011 counted 103,786 people in 31,752 households. The 2016 census measured the population of the county as 101,666 in 33,537 households.

=== Administrative divisions ===
Tuyserkan County's population history and administrative structure over three consecutive censuses are shown in the following table.

Tuyserkan County Population
| Administrative Divisions | 2006 | 2011 | 2016 |
|---|---|---|---|
| Central District | 88,251 | 84,214 | 84,742 |
| Hayaquq-e Nabi RD | 15,699 | 11,805 | 10,169 |
| Khorram Rud RD | 12,220 | 10,996 | 8,751 |
| Korzan Rud RD | 5,032 | 4,342 | 3,432 |
| Seyyed Shahab RD | 8,223 | 8,284 | 7,854 |
| Sarkan (city) | 4,557 | 4,271 | 4,081 |
| Tuyserkan (city) | 42,520 | 44,516 | 50,455 |
| Qolqol Rud District | 21,011 | 19,572 | 16,773 |
| Kamal Rud RD | 2,733 | 2,688 | 2,330 |
| Miyan Rud RD | 10,449 | 9,321 | 8,231 |
| Qolqol Rud RD | 6,221 | 5,842 | 4,686 |
| Farasfaj (city) | 1,608 | 1,721 | 1,526 |
| Total | 109,262 | 103,786 | 101,666 |
RD = Rural District

== See also ==
Media related to Tuyserkan County at Wikimedia Commons
