= Central District (Tuyserkan County) =

District in Hamadan province, Iran

Central District (Tuyserkan County) Persian: بخش مرکزی شهرستان تویسرکان
- District
- Location within Iran
- Coordinates: 34°34′N 48°21′E
- Country: Iran
- Province: Hamadan
- County: Tuyserkan
- Capital: Tuyserkan

Population (2016)
  - Total: 84,742
- Time zone: UTC+3:30 (IRST)

The Central District of Tuyserkan County (Persian: بخش مرکزی شهرستان تویسرکان) is in Hamadan province, Iran. Its capital is the city of Tuyserkan.

== Demographics ==
=== Population ===
At the time of the 2006 National Census, the district's population was 88,251 in 24,004 households. The following census in 2011 counted 84,214 people in 26,192 households. The 2016 census measured the population of the district as 84,742 inhabitants in 28,326 households.

=== Administrative divisions ===
Central District (Tuyserkan County) Population
Administrative Divisions	2006	2011	2016
Hayaquq-e Nabi RD	15,699	11,805	10,169
Khorram Rud RD	12,220	10,996	8,751
Korzan Rud RD	5,032	4,342	3,432
Seyyed Shahab RD	8,223	8,284	7,854
Sarkan (city)	4,557	4,271	4,081
Tuyserkan (city)	42,520	44,516	50,455
Total	88,251	84,214	84,742
RD = Rural District
