= Hajjiabad =

Hajjiabad or Hajiabad may refer to:

== Iran ==
=== Alborz Province ===
- Hajjiabad, Alborz, a village in Nazarabad County

=== Ardabil Province ===
- Hajjiabad, Ardabil, a village in Khalkhal County

=== Bushehr Province ===
- Hajjiabad, Dashtestan, a village in Dashtestan County
- Hajjiabad, Jam, a village in Jam County
- Hajjiabad, Tangestan, a village in Tangestan County

=== Chaharmahal and Bakhtiari Province ===
- Hajjiabad, Farsan, a village in Farsan County
- Hajjiabad, Kiar, a village in Kiar County
- Hajjiabad, Kuhrang, a village in Kuhrang County
- Hajjiabad, Bazoft, a village in Kuhrang County
- Hajjiabad-e Jalil, a village in Kuhrang County
- Hajjiabad, Lordegan, a village in Lordegan County

=== East Azerbaijan Province ===
- Hajjiabad, East Azerbaijan, a village in Charuymaq County

=== Fars Province ===
- Hajjiabad, Eqlid, a village in Eqlid County
- Hajjiabad, Jahrom, a village in Jahrom County
- Hajiabad, Jahrom, a village in Jahrom County
- Hajjiabad, Kazerun, a village in Kazerun County
- Hajjiabad, Chenar Shahijan, a village in Kazerun County
- Hajjiabad, Shapur, a village in Kazerun County
- Hajjiabad, Kharameh, a village in Kharameh County
- Hajjiabad (30°38′ N 53°14′ E), Khorrambid, a village in Khorrambid County
- Hajjiabad, Lamerd, a village in Lamerd County
- Hajjiabad, Sahray-ye Bagh, a village in Larestan County
- Hajjiabad, Marvdasht, a village in Marvdasht County
- Hajjiabad, Kamfiruz, a village in Marvdasht County
- Hajjiabad, Mohr, a village in Mohr County
- Hajjiabad, Galleh Dar, a village in Mohr County
- Hajjiabad-e Mallu, a village in Mohr County
- Hajjiabad, Neyriz, a village in Neyriz County
- Hajjiabad, Qir and Karzin, a village in Qir and Karzin County
- Hajjiabad, Sepidan, a village in Sepidan County
- Hajjiabad, Hamaijan, a village in Sepidan County
- Hajjiabad, Shiraz, a village in Shariz County
- Hajjiabad-e Pas Kuhak, a village in Shariz County
- Hajjiabad, Fars, a city in Zarrin Dasht County

=== Gilan Province ===
- Hajjiabad, Amlash, a village in Amlash County
- Hajjiabad, Lahijan, a village in Lahijan County
- Hajjiabad, Rudsar, a village in Rudsar County

=== Golestan Province ===
- Hajjiabad, Azadshahr, a village in Azadshahr County
- Hajjiabad, Kordkuy, a village in Kordkuy County
- Hajjiabad-e Kuh Payeh, a village in Kordkuy County

=== Hamadan Province ===
- Hajjiabad, Famenin, a village in Famenin County
- Hajjiabad, Malayer, a village in Malayer County
- Hajjiabad, Nahavand, a village in Nahavand County
- Hajjiabad-e Kark, a village in Nahavand County
- Hajjiabad-e Milab, a village in Nahavand County
- Hajjiabad, Tuyserkan, a village in Tuyserkan County

=== Hormozgan Province ===
- Hajjiabad, Hormozgan, a city in Hajjiabad County
- Hajjiabad County, in Hormozgan Province, Iran
- Hajjiabad-e Sarhadi, a village in Bashagard County
- Hajjiabad-e Baghat, a village in Hajjiabad County
- Hajjiabad, Jask, a village in Jask County
- Hajjiabad, Minab, a village in Minab County
- Hajjiabad, Parsian, a village in Parsian County
- Hajjiabad, Rudan, a village in Rudan County

=== Isfahan Province ===
- Hajjiabad, Falavarjan, a village in Falavarjan County
- Hajjiabad, former name of Harand, Iran, a city in Isfahan County
- Hajjiabad, Baraan-e Jonubi, a village in Isfahan County
- Hajjiabad, Baraan-e Shomali, a village in Isfahan County
- Hajjiabad, Khvansar, a village in Khvansar County
- Hajjiabad, Nain, a village in Nain County
- Hajjiabad, Najafabad, a village in Najafabad County
- Hajjiabad, Semirom, a village in Semirom County
- Hajjiabad-e Shureh Chaman, a village in Semirom County

=== Kerman Province ===
- Hajjiabad, Mardehek, a village in Anbarabad County
- Hajjiabad, Nargesan, a village in Anbarabad County
- Hajjiabad-e Mir Hoseyni, a village in Anbarabad County
- Hajjiabad-e Do, Kerman, a village in Fahraj County
- Hajjiabad-e Hajj Ali Mohammad, a village in Fahraj County
- Hajjiabad, Maskun, a village in Jiroft County
- Hajjiabad-e Nazri, a village in Kerman County
- Hajjiabad, Qaleh Ganj, a village in Qaleh Ganj County
- Hajjiabad-e Payabi, a village in Qaleh Ganj County
- Hajjiabad, Kabutar Khan, a village in Rafsanjan County
- Hajjiabad, Rigan, a village in Rigan County
- Hajjiabad, Rudbar-e Jonubi, a village in Rudbar-e Jonubi County
- Hajjiabad, Sirjan, a village in Sirjan County

=== Kermanshah Province ===
- Hajjiabad-e Do, Kermanshah, a village in Kangavar County
- Hajjiabad-e Yek, a village in Kangavar County
- Hajjiabad, Kermanshah, a village in Kermanshah County
- Hajjiabad, Mahidasht, a village in Kermanshah County
- Hajjiabad, Ravansar, a village in Ravansar County
- Hajjiabad-e Shanrash, a village in Ravansar County
- Hajjiabad, Sonqor, a village in Sonqor County

=== Khuzestan Province ===
- Hajjiabad, Andika, a village in Andika County
- Hajjiabad, Masjed Soleyman, a village in Masjed Soleyman County
- Hajjiabad, Ramhormoz, a village in Ramhormoz County

=== Kurdistan Province ===
- Hajjiabad, Chang Almas, a village in Bijar County
- Hajjiabad, Korani, a village in Bijar County
- Hajjiabad, Dehgolan, a village in Dehgolan County
- Hajjiabad, Bolbanabad, a village in Dehgolan County
- Hajjiabad, Qorveh, a village in Qorveh County

=== Lorestan Province ===
==== Aligudarz County ====
- Hajjiabad Beshaq, a village in the Central District
- Hajjiabad Darvish, a village in the Central District
- Hajjiabad-e Olya, Lorestan, a village in the Central District

==== Borujerd County ====
- Hajjiabad, Darreh Seydi, a village in Darreh Seydi Rural District, Central District
- Hajjiabad, Hemmatabad, a village in Hemmatabad Rural District, Central District

==== Delfan County ====
- Hajjiabad, Mirbag-e Jonubi, a village in Mirbag-e Jonubi Rural District, Central District
- Hajjiabad, Nurabad, a village in Nurabad Rural District, Central District
- Hajjiabad, Kakavand, a village in Kakavand District
- Hajjiabad-e Jadid, a village in Kakavand District

==== Dorud County ====
- Hajjiabad-e Yarahmadi, a village in Silakhor District

==== Khorramabad County ====
- Hajjiabad, Khorramabad, a village in Chaghalvandi District

==== Selseleh County ====
- Hajjiabad, Selseleh, a village in Selseleh County
- Hajjiabad, alternate name of Gol Dulatshahi, a village in Selseleh County

=== Markazi Province ===
- Hajjiabad, Arak, a village in Arak County
- Hajjiabad, Khomeyn, a village in Khomeyn County
- Hajjiabad, Kamareh, a village in Khomeyn County
- Hajjiabad, Khondab, a village in Khondab County
- Hajjiabad, Mahallat, a village in Mahallat County
- Hajjiabad, Shazand, a village in Shazand County
- Hajjiabad, Zarandieh, a village in Zarandieh County

=== Mazandaran Province ===
- Hajjiabad, Amol, a village in Amol County
- Hajjiabad, Nur, a village in Nur County
- Hajjiabad, Qaem Shahr, a village in Qaem Shahr County
- Hajjiabad, Mazkureh, a village in Sari County
- Hajjiabad, Rudpey-ye Jonubi, a village in Sari County
- Hajjiabad, Tonekabon, a village in Tonekabon County

=== Qazvin Province ===
- Hajjiabad, Abyek, a village in Abyek County
- Hajjiabad, alternate name of Mehdiabad-e Bozorg, a village in Qazvin County
- Hajjiabad, Qazvin, a village in Qazvin County
- Hajjiabad, Takestan, a village in Takestan County

=== Qom Province ===
- Hajjiabad, Qom, a village in Qom Province of Iran
- Hajjiabad-e Aqa, a village in Qom Province of Iran
- Hajjiabad-e Neyzaz, a village in Qom Province of Iran

=== Razavi Khorasan Province ===
==== Bakharz County ====
- Hajjiabad, Bakharz, a village in Bakharz County

==== Chenaran County ====
- Hajjiabad, Chenaran, a village in Chenaran County
- Hajjiabad, Golbajar, a village in Chenaran County

==== Fariman County ====
- Hajjiabad, Fariman, a village in Fariman County

==== Gonabad County ====
- Hajjiabad, Gonabad, a village in Gonabad County

==== Joghatai County ====
- Hajjiabad, Joghatai, a village in Joghatai County

==== Jowayin County ====
- Hajjiabad-e Bazzazi, a village in Jowayin County
- Hajjiabad-e Hajji Safar, a village in Jowayin County

==== Kalat County ====
- Hajjiabad, Kalat, a village in Kalat County

==== Kashmar County ====
- Hajjiabad, Kashmar, a village in Kashmar County

==== Khvaf County ====
- Hajjiabad, Khvaf, a village in Khvaf County

==== Mashhad County ====
- Hajjiabad, Ahmadabad, a village in Mashhad County
- Hajjiabad, Mashhad, a village in Mashhad County

==== Nishapur County ====
- Hajjiabad, Miyan Jolgeh, a village in Nishapur County
- Hajjiabad, Sarvelayat, a village in Nishapur County
- Hajjiabad, Zeberkhan, a village in Nishapur County

==== Taybad County ====
- Hajjiabad, Taybad, a village in Taybad County

==== Torbat-e Jam County ====
- Hajjiabad, Torbat-e Jam, a village in Torbat-e Jam County
- Hajjiabad, Salehabad, a village in Torbat-e Jam County
- Hajjiabad-e Hajji Ebrahim, a village in Torbat-e Jam County
- Hajjiabad Molla Qasem, a village in Torbat-e Jam County
- Hajjiabad-e Molla Yaqub, a village in Torbat-e Jam County

==== Zaveh County ====
- Hajjiabad, Zaveh, a village in Zaveh County

=== Semnan Province ===
- Hajjiabad-e Bostijian, a village in Damghan County
- Hajjiabad-e Razveh, a village in Damghan County
- Hajjiabad-e Atashgah, a village in Garmsar County
- Hajjiabad-e Khvoriad, a village in Semnan County

=== Sistan and Baluchestan Province ===
- Hajjiabad, Abreis, a village in Iranshahr County
- Hajjiabad, Bazman, a village in Iranshahr County
- Hajjiabad, Eskelabad, a village in Khash County
- Hajjiabad (28°38′ N 60°24′ E), Gowhar Kuh, a village in Khash County
- Hajjiabad (28°40′ N 60°21′ E), Gowhar Kuh, a village in Khash County
- Hajjiabad, alternate name of Gazu, a village in Khash County
- Hajjiabad, alternate name of Mowtowr-e Khvabiar, a village in Khash County
- Hajjiabad, Qasr-e Qand, a village in Qasr-e Qand County

=== South Khorasan Province ===
- Hajjiabad, Alqurat, a village in Birjand County
- Hajjiabad (32°46′ N 59°31′ E), Baqeran, a village in Birjand County
- Hajjiabad, Nehbandan, a village in Nehbandan County
- Hajjiabad, Shusef, a village in Nehbandan County
- Hajiabad, Shusef, a village in Nehbandan County
- Hajjiabad-e Nughab, a village in Qaen County
- Hajjiabad, Sarbisheh, a village in Sarbisheh County
- Hajjiabad, Mud, a village in Sarbisheh County
- Hajjiabad, South Khorasan, a city in Zirkuh County

=== Tehran Province ===
- Hajjiabad, Shemiranat, a village in Shemiranat County
- Hajjiabad-e Arabha, a village in Varamin County
- Hajjiabad-e Amlak, a village in Pakdasht County
- Hajjiabad-e Salar, a village in Varamin County
- Hajjiabad-e Sofla, a village in Malard County

=== West Azerbaijan Province ===
- Hajjiabad-e Okhtachi, a village in Bukan County
- Hajjiabad, Mahabad, a village in Mahabad County
- Hajjiabad, Shahin Dezh, a village in Shahin Dezh County
- Hajjiabad, Urmia, a village in Urmia County
- Hajjiabad, Sumay-ye Beradust, a village in Urmia County

=== Yazd Province ===
==== Ardakan County ====
- Hajjiabad, Ardakan, a village in Ardakan County

==== Behabad County ====
- Hajjiabad, Behabad, a village in Behabad County
- Hajjiabad, Asfyj, a village in Behabad County

==== Khatam County ====
- Hajjiabad, Marvast, a village in Khatam County

==== Saduq County ====
- Hajjiabad, Saduq, a village in Saduq County
- Hajjiabad, alternate name of Aliabad, Saduq, a village in Saduq County

==== Taft County ====
- Hajjiabad, Garizat, a village in Taft County
- Hajjiabad, Sakhvid, a village in Taft County
- Hajjiabad-e Bala, a village in Taft County

== Pakistan ==
- Hajiabad, Pakistan, a town in Kotli District, Azad Kashmir

== See also ==
- Hajipur (disambiguation)
