= Hajipur (disambiguation) =

Hajipur is a city and headquarters of Vaishali district, Bihar state, India.

Hajipur could refer to:

== Hajipur, Bihar ==
- Hajipur Junction railway station, zonal headquarter of East Central Railway
- Hajipur Nagar Parishad, the municipal organisation and civic agency of Hajipur, Bihar state.
- List of villages in Hajipur block, is a list of villages in vaishali district, Bihar state
- Hajipur (community development block), district subdivision of vaishali
- Export Promotion Park of India, Hajipur, is a multiple - product export processing zone and administrative body of Hajipur, Bihar, India

== Places ==
- Hajipur (Meerut), a village in Meerut district, Uttar Pradesh state, India
- Hajipur, Punjab, a census town of Hoshiarpur district, Punjab state, India
- Behta Hajipur, a census town in Ghaziabad district, Uttar Pradesh state, India
- Patli-Hajipur, a village in Gurgaon district, Haryana state, India
- Hajipurwadi, a village in Aurangabad district, Maharashtra state, India
- Hajipur (Telangana) a Village and Mandal in Mancherial District, Telangana State, India.
- Hajipur, Chhatoh, a village in Raebareli district, Uttar Pradesh, India
- Hajipur, Dih, Raebareli, a village in Raebareli district, Uttar Pradesh, India

== Politics ==
- Hajipur (Lok Sabha constituency), a Lok Sabha constituency in Bihar, India
- Hajipur (Vidhan Sabha constituency), an assembly constituency in Bihar

== See also ==
- Hajiabad (disambiguation)
