= Abkuh-e Aliabad =

Village in Razavi Khorasan province, Iran

Abkuh-e Aliabad Persian: ابكوه علي اباد
- Village
- Location within Iran
- Coordinates: 35°15′26.9″N 58°26′10.4″E
- Country: Iran
- Province: Razavi Khorasan
- County: Kashmar
- District: Central
- Rural District: Pain Velayat

Population (2016)
  - Total: Below reporting threshold
- Time zone: UTC+3:30 (IRST)

Abkuh-e Aliabad (Persian: آبکوه علی‌آباد) (Note: Also romanized as Abkuh Aliabad, Ābḵūh ‘Alīābād, and Ābḵūh-e ‘Alīābād) is a village in Pain Velayat Rural District of the Central District in Kashmar County, Razavi Khorasan province, Iran.

== Demographics ==
=== Population ===
At the time of the 2006 National Census, the village's population was 16 in five households. The following census in 2011 counted 12 people in four households. The 2016 census measured the population of the village as below the reporting threshold.
