= Zendeh Jan, Iran =

Village in Razavi Khorasan province, Iran

Zendeh Jan Persian: زنده جان
- Village
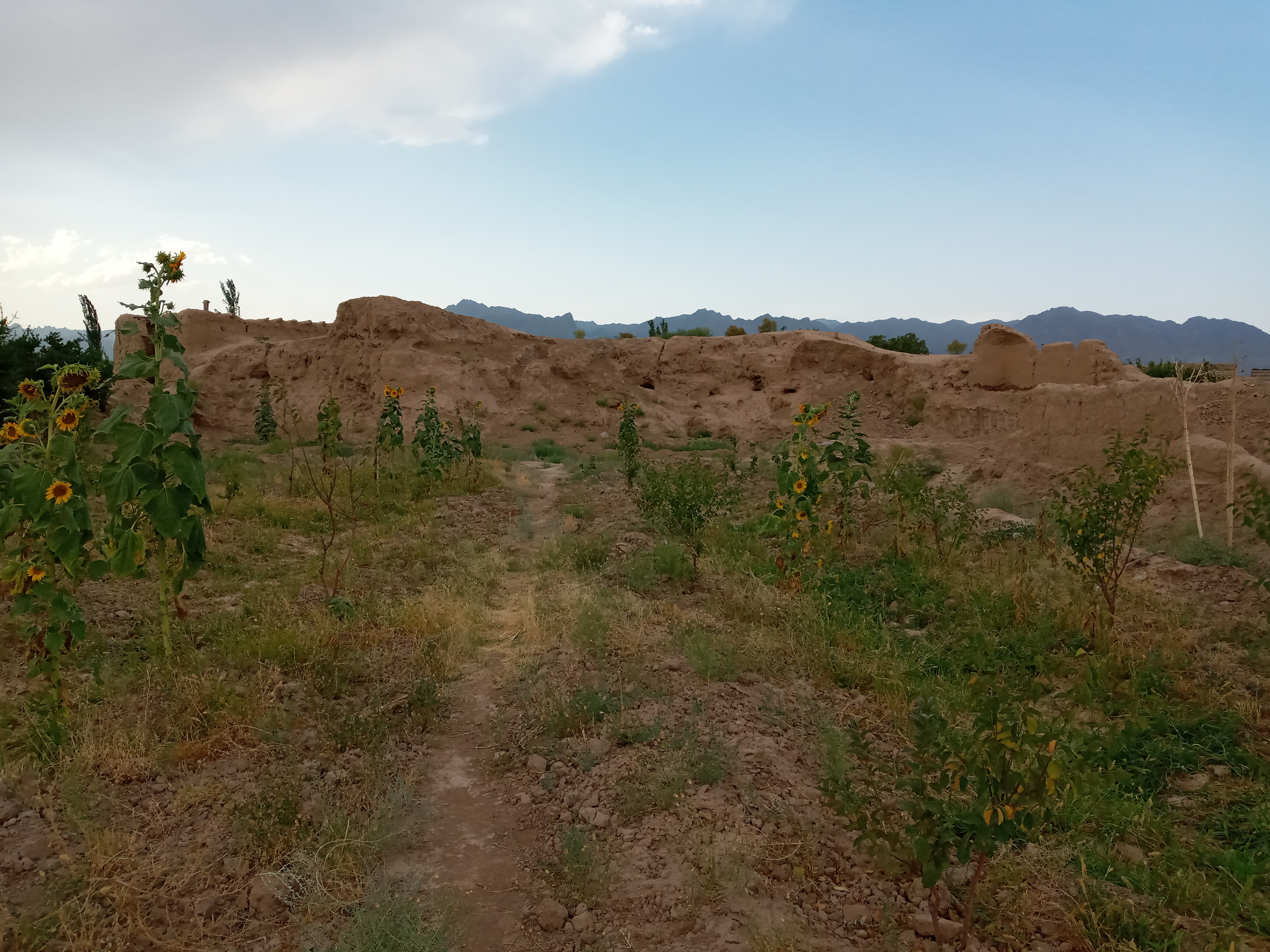
- Old castle in the village of Zendeh Jan

- Location within Iran
- Coordinates: 35°15′11″N 58°24′22″E
- Country: Iran
- Province: Razavi Khorasan
- County: Kashmar
- District: Central
- Rural District: Pain Velayat

Population (2016)
  - Total: 1,786
- Time zone: UTC+3:30 (IRST)

Zendeh Jan (Persian: زنده جان) (Note: Also romanized as Zendeh Jān) is a village in Pain Velayat Rural District of the Central District in Kashmar County, Razavi Khorasan province, Iran.

== Demographics ==
=== Population ===
At the time of the 2006 National Census, the village's population was 1,450 in 396 households. The following census in 2011 counted 1,708 people in 518 households. The 2016 census measured the population of the village as 1,786 people in 560 households.
