= Muzi =

Muzi may refer to:

- Muzi language
- Hajjiabad-e Muzi, Iran
- Muzi, Guangxi, a town in Gangnan District, Guangxi, China
- Muzi, Kakao Friends characters

== People ==
- Muzi Khoza, South African politician
- Muzi Mei, Chinese journalist and blogger
- Muzi Epifani, Italian writer and poet
- Muzi (musician), Musical artist
