= Kalateh-ye Ahmadi =

Village in Razavi Khorasan province, Iran

Kalateh-ye Ahmadi Persian: كلاته احمدي
- Village
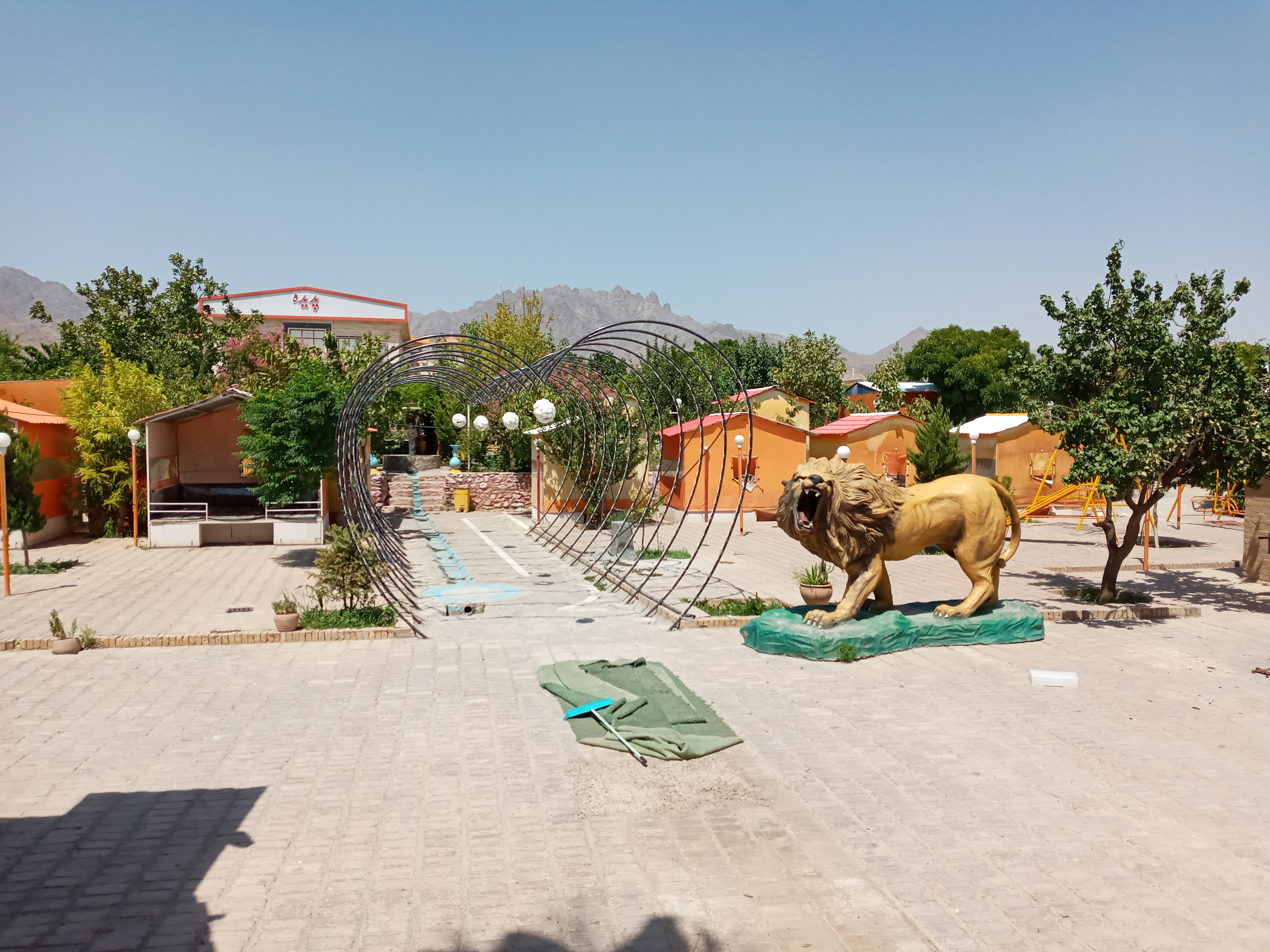
- The village of Kalateh-ye Ahmadi in 2021

- Location within Iran
- Coordinates: 35°17′07″N 58°28′56″E
- Country: Iran
- Province: Razavi Khorasan
- County: Kashmar
- District: Central
- Rural District: Pain Velayat

Population (2016)
  - Total: 126
- Time zone: UTC+3:30 (IRST)

Kalateh-ye Ahmadi (Persian: كلاته احمدي) (Note: Also romanized as Kalāteh-ye Aḩmadī; formerly known as Kalāteh-ye Pazī (كلاته پزي)) is a village in Pain Velayat Rural District of the Central District in Kashmar County, Razavi Khorasan province, Iran.

== Demographics ==
=== Population ===
At the time of the 2006 National Census, the village's population was 112 in 28 households. The following census in 2011 counted 63 people in 14 households. The 2016 census measured the population of the village as 126 people in 36 households.
