= Momrabad =

Village in Razavi Khorasan province, Iran

Momrabad Persian: ممراباد
- Village
- Location within Iran
- Coordinates: 35°12′59″N 58°24′10″E
- Country: Iran
- Province: Razavi Khorasan
- County: Kashmar
- District: Central
- Rural District: Pain Velayat

Population (2016)
  - Total: 1,134
- Time zone: UTC+3:30 (IRST)

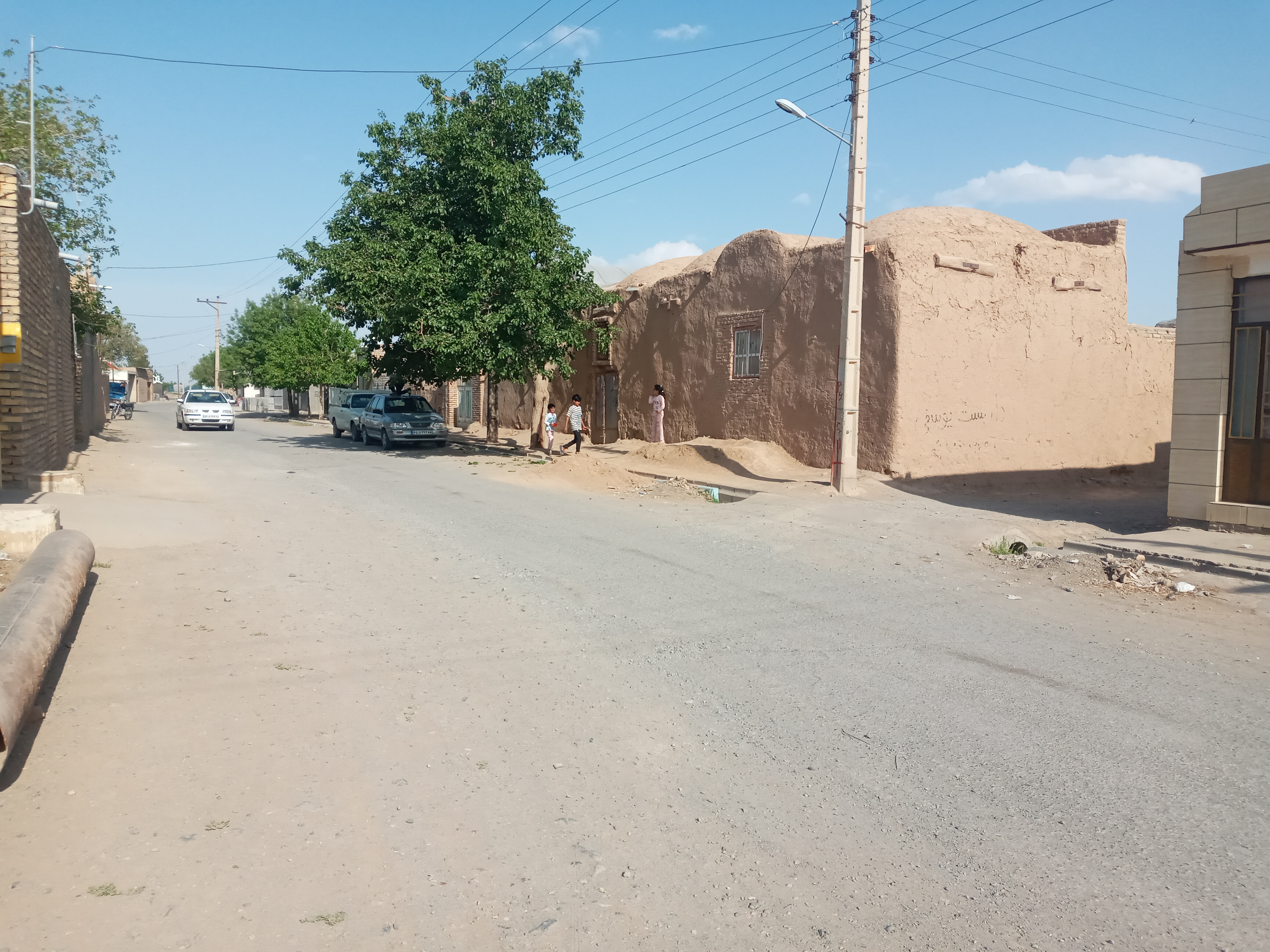
Momrabad in 2021

Momrabad (Persian: ممراباد) (Note: Also romanized as Momrābād) is a village in Pain Velayat Rural District of the Central District in Kashmar County, Razavi Khorasan province, Iran.

== Demographics ==
=== Population ===
At the time of the 2006 National Census, the village's population was 942 in 260 households. The following census in 2011 counted 1,189 people in 362 households. The 2016 census measured the population of the village as 1,134 people in 354 households.
