= Eshratabad, Kashmar =

Village in Razavi Khorasan province, Iran

Eshratabad Persian: عشرت اباد
- Village
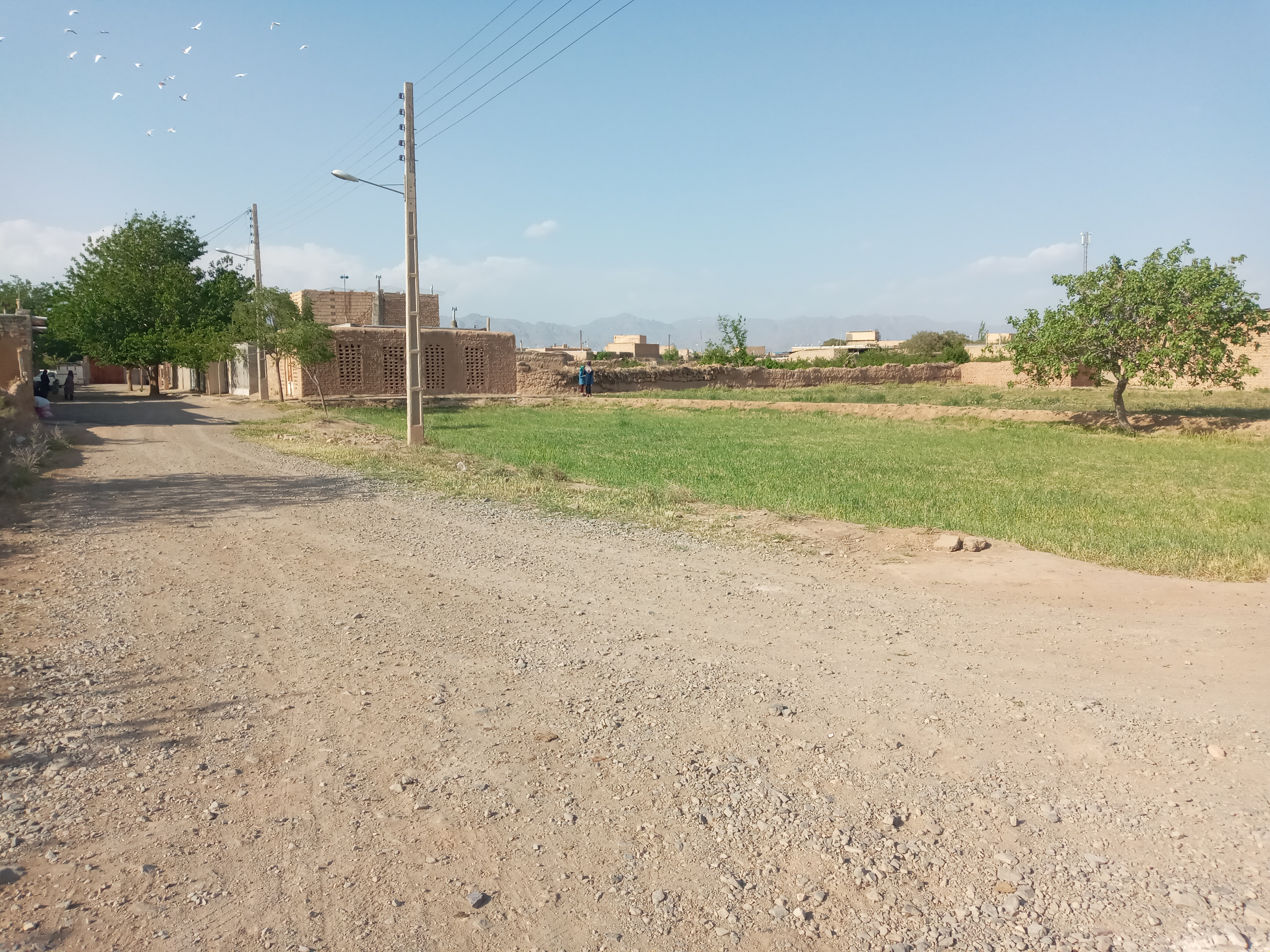
- The village of Eshratabad in 2021

- Location within Iran
- Coordinates: 35°12′25″N 58°23′48″E
- Country: Iran
- Province: Razavi Khorasan
- County: Kashmar
- District: Central
- Rural District: Pain Velayat

Population (2016)
  - Total: 1,631
- Time zone: UTC+3:30 (IRST)

Eshratabad (Persian: عشرت اباد) (Note: Also romanized as ‘Eshratābād; also known as Nowzad) is a village in Pain Velayat Rural District of the Central District in Kashmar County, Razavi Khorasan province, Iran.

== Demographics ==
=== Population ===
At the time of the 2006 National Census, the village's population was 1,272 in 347 households. The following census in 2011 counted 1,508 people in 463 households. The 2016 census measured the population of the village as 1,631 people in 517 households.
