= Kalateh-ye Mohammadabad =

Village in Razavi Khorasan province, Iran

Kalateh-ye Mohammadabad Persian: كلاته محمداباد
- Village
- Location within Iran
- Country: Iran
- Province: Razavi Khorasan
- County: Kashmar
- District: Central
- Rural District: Pain Velayat

Population (2016)
  - Total: 0
- Time zone: UTC+3:30 (IRST)

Kalateh-ye Mohammadabad (Persian: كلاته محمداباد) (Note: Also romanized as Kalāteh-ye Moḩammadābād; formerly known as Kalāteh-ye Shāh Moḩammad (كلاته شاه محمد)) is a village in Pain Velayat Rural District of the Central District in Kashmar County, Razavi Khorasan province, Iran.

== Demographics ==
=== Population ===
At the time of the 2006 National Census, the village's population was 14 in four households. The village did not appear in the following census of 2011. The 2016 census measured the population of the village as zero.
