= Pain Velayat Rural District =

Pain Velayat Rural District (Persian: دهستان پائين ولايت) may refer to:

- Pain Velayat Rural District (Kashmar County)
- Pain Velayat Rural District (Mashhad County)
- Pain Velayat Rural District (Taybad County)
- Pain Velayat Rural District (Torbat-e Heydarieh County)
