= Mohammadiyeh, Kashmar =

Village in Razavi Khorasan province, Iran

Mohammadiyeh Persian: محمديه
- Village
- Location within Iran
- Coordinates: 35°15′44″N 58°21′40″E
- Country: Iran
- Province: Razavi Khorasan
- County: Kashmar
- District: Central
- Rural District: Pain Velayat

Population (2016)
  - Total: 1,309
- Time zone: UTC+3:30 (IRST)

Mohammadiyeh (Persian: محمديه) (Note: Also romanized as Moḩammadīyeh) is a village in Pain Velayat Rural District of the Central District in Kashmar County, Razavi Khorasan province, Iran.

== Demographics ==
=== Population ===
At the time of the 2006 National Census, the village's population was 1,341 in 390 households. The following census in 2011 counted 1,386 people in 440 households. The 2016 census measured the population of the village as 1,309 people in 434 households.
