= Showkatiyeh =

Village in Razavi Khorasan province, Iran

Showkatiyeh Persian: شوكتيه
- Village
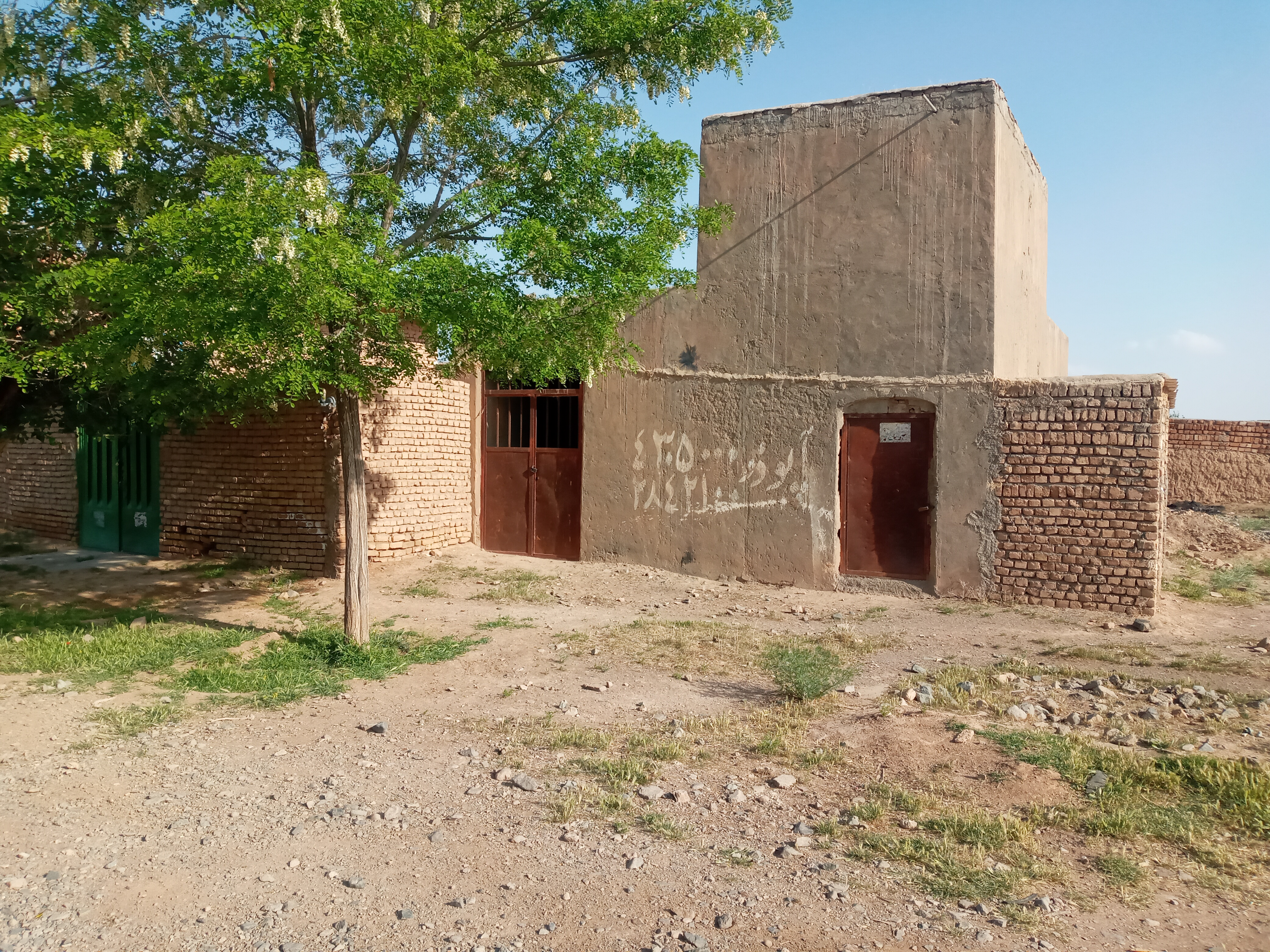
- The village of Showkatiyeh in 2021

- Location within Iran
- Coordinates: 35°12′13″N 58°24′27″E
- Country: Iran
- Province: Razavi Khorasan
- County: Kashmar
- District: Central
- Rural District: Pain Velayat

Population (2016)
  - Total: 23
- Time zone: UTC+3:30 (IRST)

Showkatiyeh (Persian: شوكتيه) (Note: Also romanized as Showkatīyeh) is a village in Pain Velayat Rural District of the Central District in Kashmar County, Razavi Khorasan province, Iran.

== Demographics ==
=== Population ===
At the time of the 2006 National Census, the village's population was 38 in 11 households. The following census in 2011 counted 42 people in 13 households. The 2016 census measured the population of the village as 23 people in seven households.
