= Mohammadabad-e Andaleyb =

Village in Razavi Khorasan province, Iran

Mohammadabad-e Andaleyb Persian: محمدابادعندليب
- Village
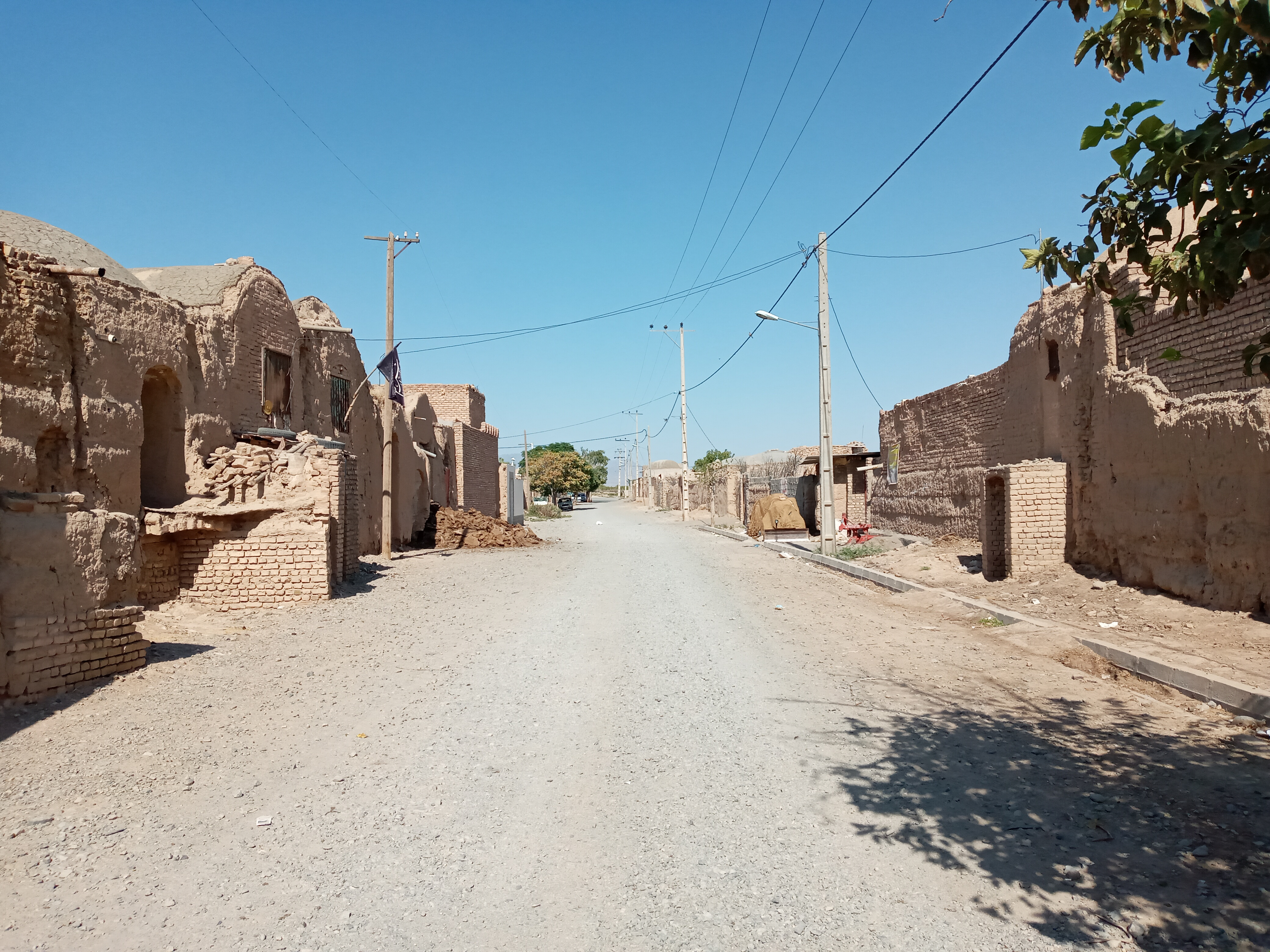
- The village of Mohammadabad-e Andaleyb in 2021

- Location within Iran
- Coordinates: 35°13′57″N 58°22′38″E
- Country: Iran
- Province: Razavi Khorasan
- County: Kashmar
- District: Central
- Rural District: Pain Velayat

Population (2016)
  - Total: Below reporting threshold
- Time zone: UTC+3:30 (IRST)

Mohammadabad-e Andaleyb (Persian: محمدابادعندليب) (Note: Also romanized as Moḩammadābād-e ʿAndaleyb; also known as Moḩammadābād and Handābād (هنداباد)) is a village in Pain Velayat Rural District of the Central District in Kashmar County, Razavi Khorasan province, Iran.

== Demographics ==
=== Population ===
At the time of the 2006 National Census, the village's population was 62 in 18 households. The following censuses in 2011 and 2016 counted a population below the reporting threshold.
