= Kasrineh =

Village in Razavi Khorasan province, Iran

Kasrineh Persian: كسرينه
- Village
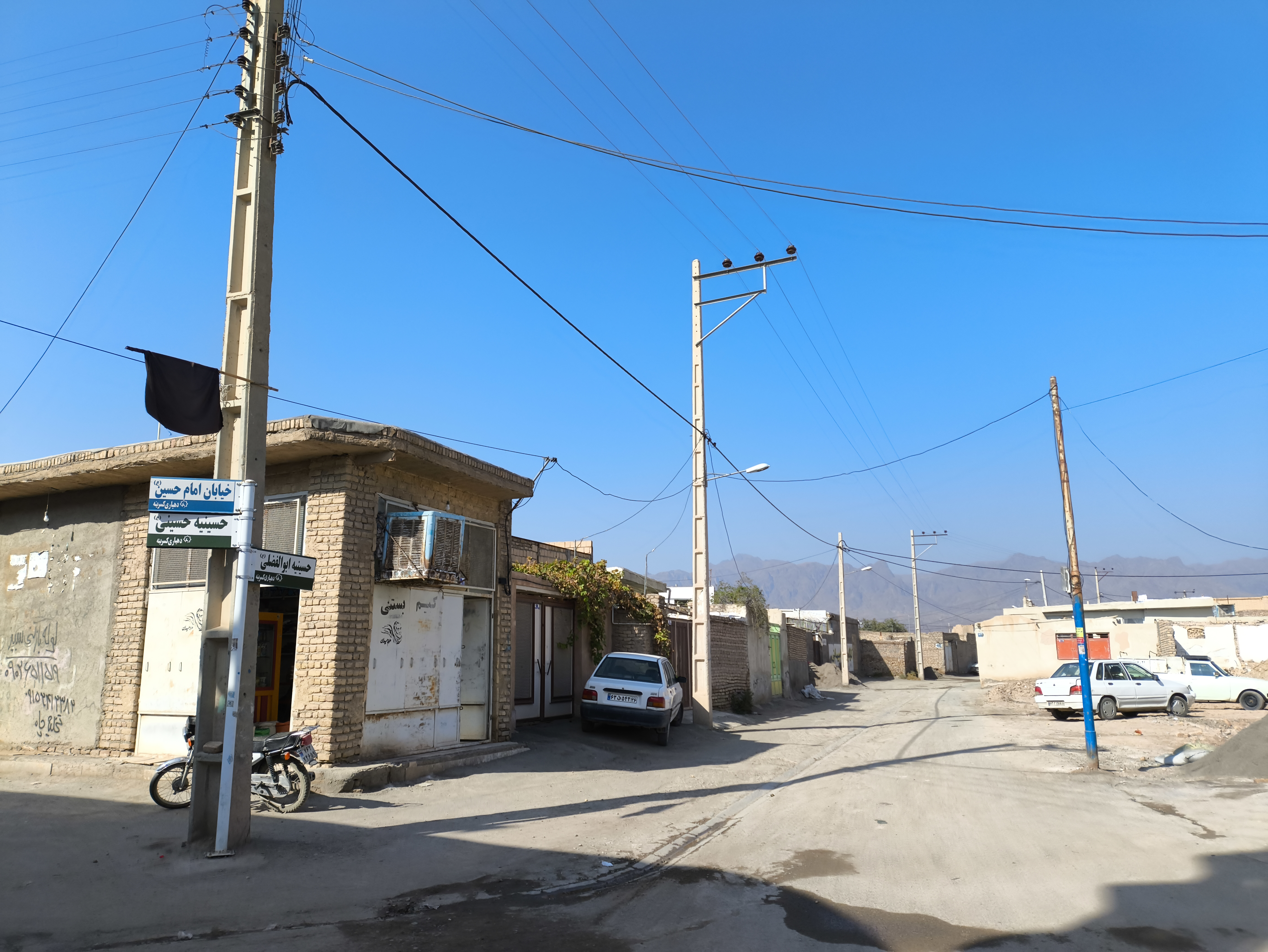
- The village of Kasrineh in 2024

- Location within Iran
- Coordinates: 35°15′26″N 58°23′58″E
- Country: Iran
- Province: Razavi Khorasan
- County: Kashmar
- District: Central
- Rural District: Pain Velayat

Population (2016)
  - Total: 2,105
- Time zone: UTC+3:30 (IRST)

Kasrineh (Persian: كسرينه) (Note: Also romanized as Kasrīneh) is a village in, and the capital of, Pain Velayat Rural District in the Central District of Kashmar County, Razavi Khorasan province, Iran.

== Demographics ==
=== Population ===
At the time of the 2006 National Census, the village's population was 1,964 in 543 households. The following census in 2011 counted 2,092 people in 639 households. The 2016 census measured the population of the village as 2,105 people in 685 households.
