= Sar Howzak =

Village in Razavi Khorasan province, Iran

Sar Howzak Persian: سرحوضك
- Village
- Location within Iran
- Coordinates: 35°15′47″N 58°22′38″E
- Country: Iran
- Province: Razavi Khorasan
- County: Kashmar
- District: Central
- Rural District: Pain Velayat

Population (2016)
  - Total: 1,438
- Time zone: UTC+3:30 (IRST)

Sar Howzak (Persian: سرحوضك) (Note: Also romanized as Sar Ḩowẕak) is a village in Pain Velayat Rural District of the Central District in Kashmar County, Razavi Khorasan province, Iran.

== Demographics ==
=== Population ===
At the time of the 2006 National Census, the village's population was 1,567 in 435 households. The following census in 2011 counted 1,537 people in 477 households. The 2016 census measured the population of the village as 1,438 people in 468 households.
