= Moghan, Kashmar =

Village in Razavi Khorasan province, Iran

Moghan Persian: مغان
- Village
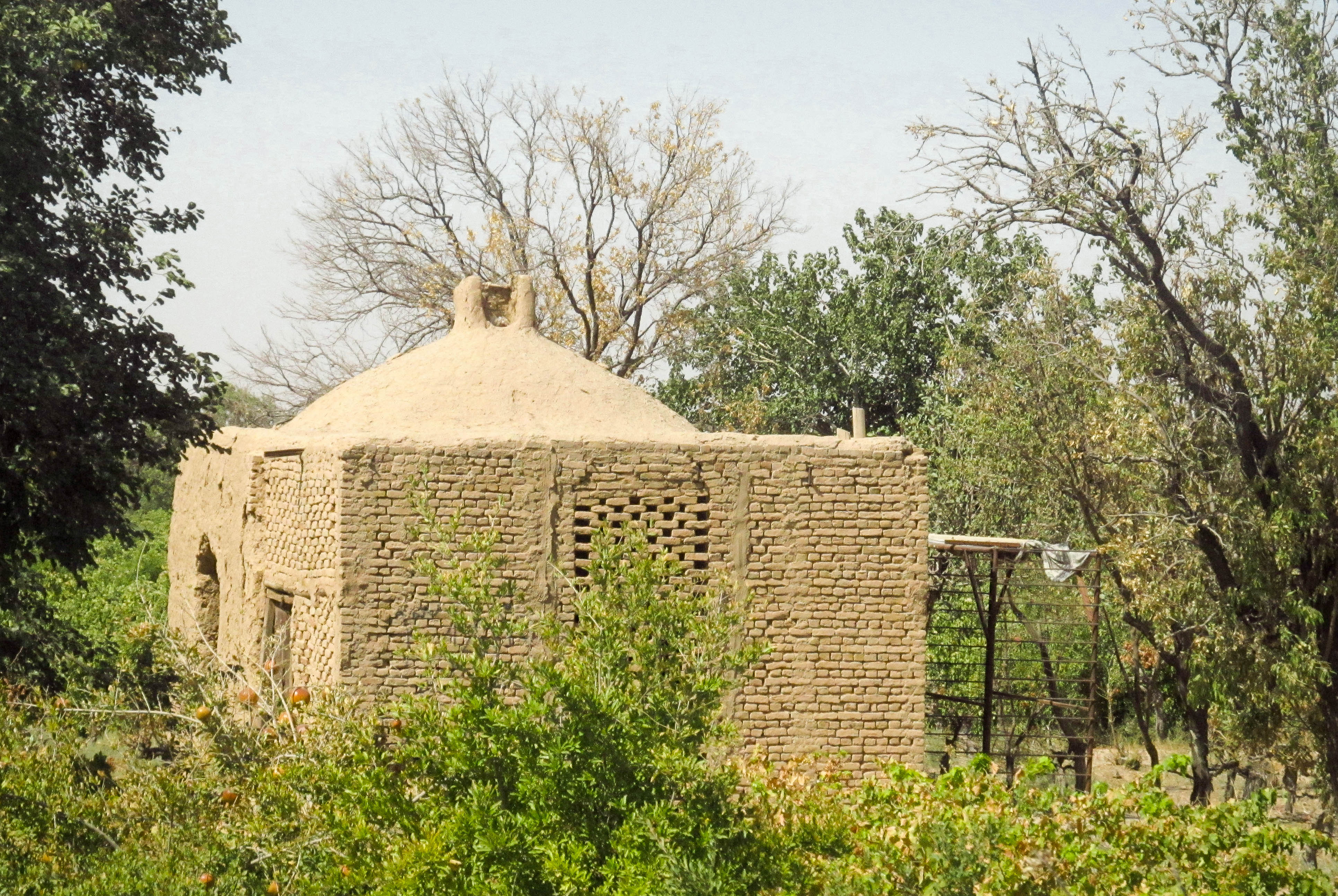
- Garden house in the village of Moghan

- Location within Iran
- Coordinates: 35°13′53″N 58°25′32″E
- Country: Iran
- Province: Razavi Khorasan
- County: Kashmar
- District: Central
- Rural District: Pain Velayat

Population (2016)
  - Total: 2,516
- Time zone: UTC+3:30 (IRST)

Moghan (Persian: مغان) (Note: Also romanized as Moghān) is a village in Pain Velayat Rural District of the Central District in Kashmar County, Razavi Khorasan province, Iran.

== Demographics ==
=== Population ===
At the time of the 2006 National Census, the village's population was 1,978 in 544 households. The following census in 2011 counted 2,274 people in 680 households. The 2016 census measured the population of the village as 2,516 people in 788 households, the most populous in its rural district.
