= Hajjiabad, Kashmar =

Village in Razavi Khorasan province, Iran

Hajjiabad Persian: حاجي اباد
- Village
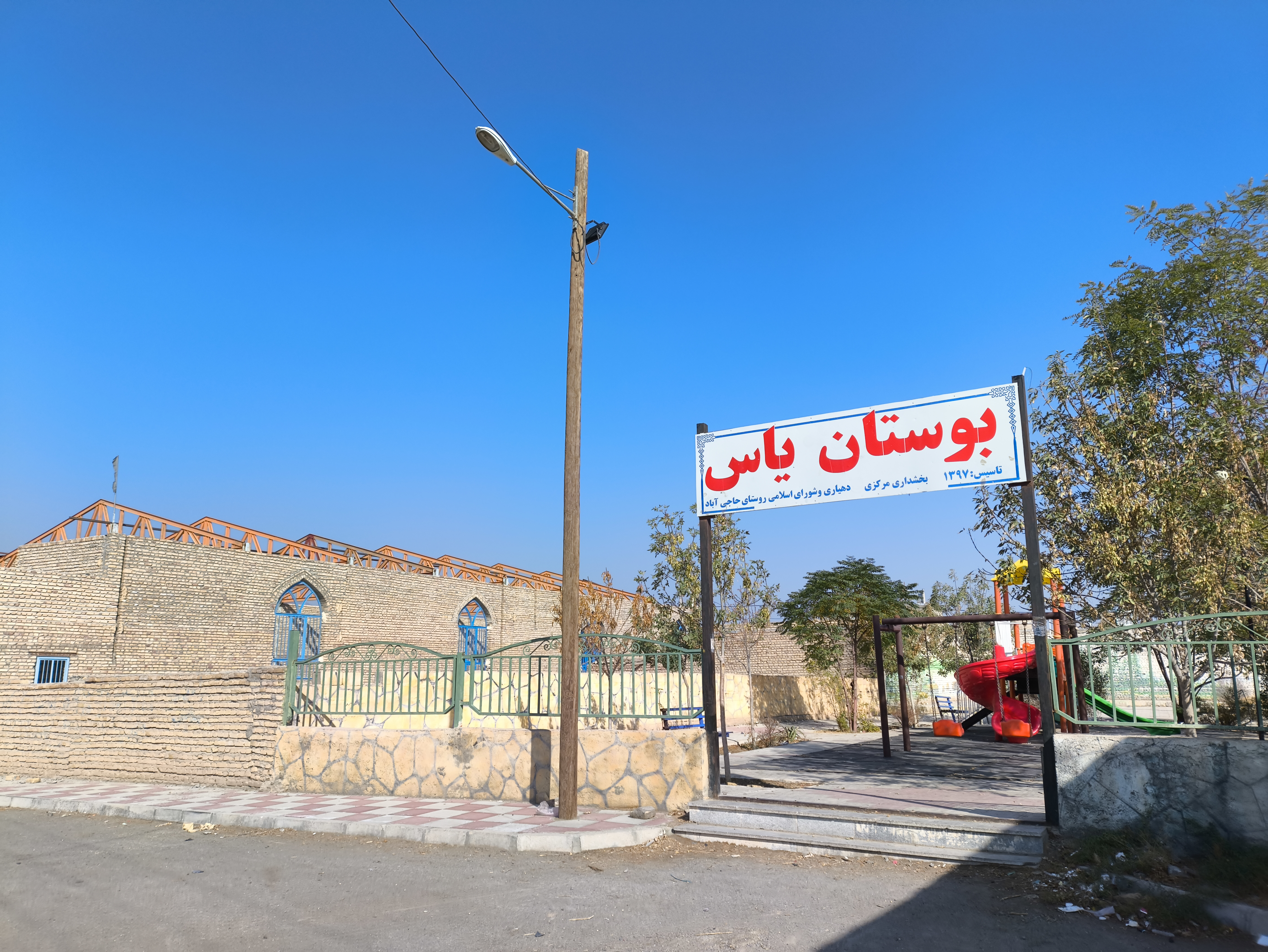
- The village of Hajjiabad in 2024

- Location within Iran
- Coordinates: 35°15′26″N 58°23′10″E
- Country: Iran
- Province: Razavi Khorasan
- County: Kashmar
- District: Central
- Rural District: Pain Velayat

Population (2016)
  - Total: 654
- Time zone: UTC+3:30 (IRST)

Hajjiabad (Persian: حاجي اباد) (Note: Also romanized as Ḩājjīābād) is a village in Pain Velayat Rural District of the Central District in Kashmar County, Razavi Khorasan province, Iran.

== Demographics ==
=== Population ===
At the time of the 2006 National Census, the village's population was 629 in 157 households. The following census in 2011 counted 681 people in 202 households. The 2016 census measured the population of the village as 654 people in 207 households.
