= Hajjiabad-e Shahlaei =

Hajjiabad-e Shahlaei حاجی‌آباد شهلایی
- village
- Location within Iran
- Coordinates: 34°12′45″N 46°55′13″E
- Country: Iran
- Province: Kermanshah
- County: Kermanshah
- Bakhsh: Mahidasht
- Rural District: Mahidasht

Population (2006)
  - Total: 236
- Time zone: UTC+3:30 (IRST)
  - Summer (DST): UTC+4:30 (IRDT)

Hajjiabad-e Shahlaei (Persian: حاجی‌آباد شهلایی, also Romanized as Ḩājjīābād-e Shahlā’ī; also known as Ḩājjīābād) is a village in Mahidasht Rural District, Mahidasht District, Kermanshah County, Kermanshah Province, Iran. At the 2006 census, its population was 236, consisting of 50 families.

The name Shahlaei comes from the Shahlaei family (Persian: شهلایی) which was one of the powerful of the region; they were big landlords and senior officials under the Qajar and Pahlavi dynasties.
