= Shahla =

Shahla or Chahla may refer to:

- Shahla (given name), a feminine given name derived from Arabic and used throughout the Muslim world
- a surname of Syrian origin, derived from the same Arabic word as above and notably borne by
  - Rossana Chahla (born 1966), Argentine gynaecologist and politician

== See also ==
- Abu Shahla or Abou Chahla, a Lebanese and Palestinian surname
- Shahla Bagh, another name of the Shalamar Gardens, Lahore
