= Shahlaei =

Shahlaei (Persian: شهلایی, romanized: Šahlâyi, IPA: [ʃæɦlɒːjiː], also transcribed as Shahlaee, Shahlai, Shahlayee, or Shahlayi) is an Iranian word meaning "of Shahla". It may refer to:

- Abdolreza Shahlaei
- Laurence Shahlaei
