= Hajipur, Chhatoh =

Hajipur
- Village
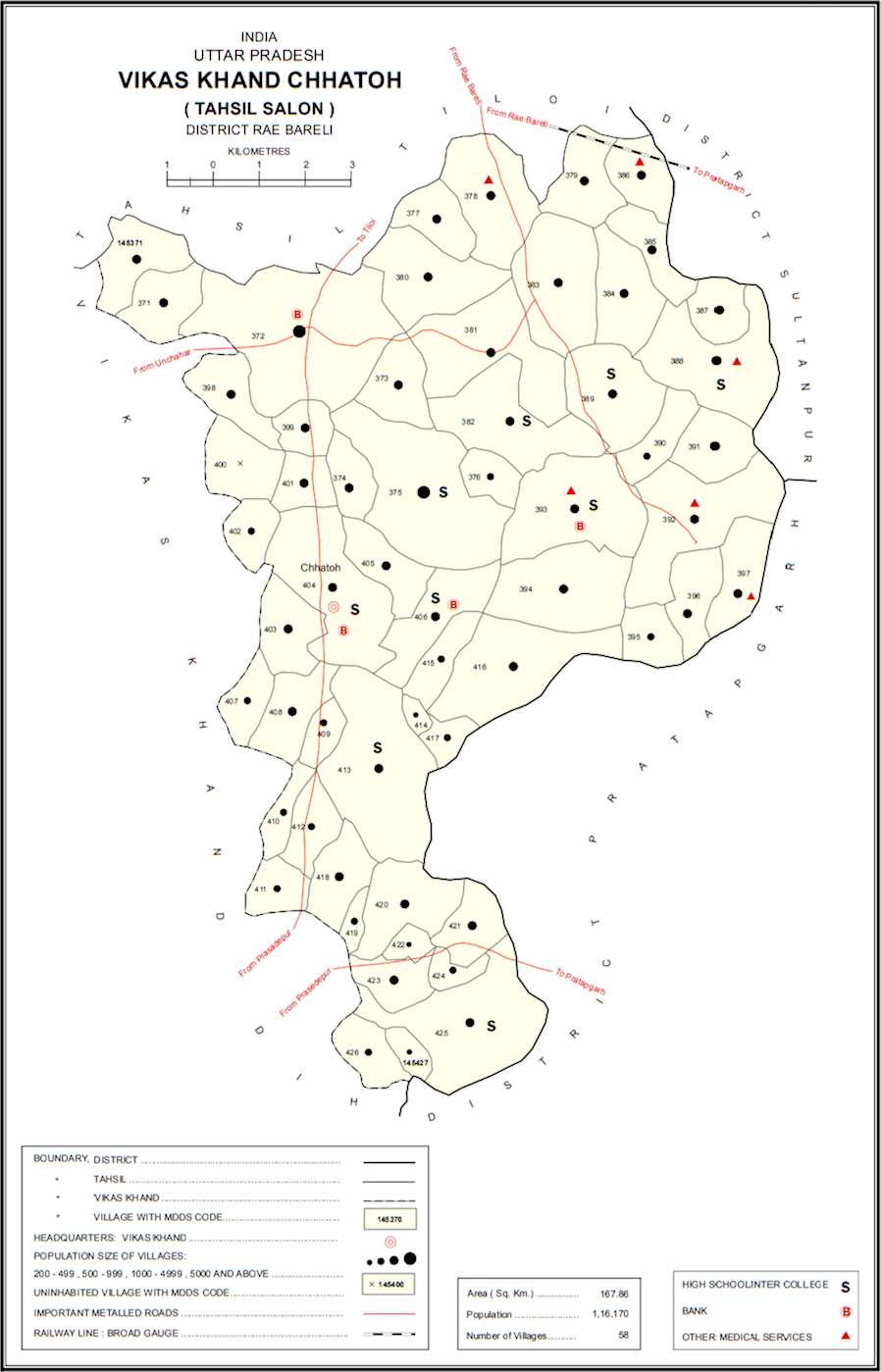
- Map showing Hajipur (#385) in Chhatoh CD block

- Location in Uttar Pradesh, India
- Coordinates: 26.235998°N 81.579848°E
- Country India: India
- State: Uttar Pradesh
- District: Raebareli

Area
  - Total: 1.721 km^{2} (0.664 sq mi)

Population (2011)
  - Total: 1,080
  - Density: 628/km^{2} (1,630/sq mi)

Languages
  - Official: Hindi
- Time zone: UTC+5:30 (IST)
- Vehicle registration: UP-35

Hajipur is a village in Chhatoh block of Rae Bareli district, Uttar Pradesh, India. It is located 36 km from Raebareli, the district headquarters. As of 2011, Hajipur has a population of 1,080 people, in 180 households. It has one primary school and no healthcare facilities. It is the headquarters of a nyaya panchayat, which also includes 5 other villages.

The 1951 census recorded Hajipur as comprising 5 hamlets, with a total population of 349 people (182 male and 167 female), in 66 households and 66 physical houses. The area of the village was given as 442 acres. No residents were literate. The village was listed as belonging to the pargana of Rokha and the thana of Nasirabad.

The 1961 census recorded Hajipur as comprising 5 hamlets, with a total population of 400 people (188 male and 212 female), in 77 households and 75 physical houses. The area of the village was given as 442 acres.

The 1981 census recorded Hajipur as having a population of 565 people, in 113 households, and having an area of 171.98 hectares. The main staple foods were listed as wheat and rice.

The 1991 census recorded Hajipur as having a total population of 687 people (334 male and 353 female), in 107 households and 107 physical houses. The area of the village was listed as 157 hectares. Members of the 0-6 age group numbered 136, or 19.8% of the total; this group was 46% male (62) and 54% female (74). Members of scheduled castes made up 34.4% of the village's population, while no members of scheduled tribes were recorded. The literacy rate of the village was 21% (117 men and 29 women). 193 people were classified as main workers (192 men and 1 woman), while 6 people were classified as marginal workers (4 men and 2 women); the remaining 488 residents were non-workers. The breakdown of main workers by employment category was as follows: 120 cultivators (i.e. people who owned or leased their own land); 53 agricultural labourers (i.e. people who worked someone else's land in return for payment); 0 workers in livestock, forestry, fishing, hunting, plantations, orchards, etc.; 0 in mining and quarrying; 0 household industry workers; 2 workers employed in other manufacturing, processing, service, and repair roles; 6 construction workers; 1 employed in trade and commerce; 3 employed in transport, storage, and communications; and 8 in other services.
