= Hajjiabad-e Mir Hoseyni =

Hajjiabad-e Mir Hoseyni حاجي ابادميرحسيني
- Village
- Location within Iran
- Coordinates: 28°25′11″N 57°49′27″E
- Country: Iran
- Province: Kerman
- County: Anbarabad
- Bakhsh: Central
- Rural District: Aliabad

Population (2006)
  - Total: 533
- Time zone: UTC+3:30 (IRST)
  - Summer (DST): UTC+4:30 (IRDT)

Hajjiabad-e Mir Hoseyni (Persian: حاجي ابادميرحسيني, also Romanized as Ḩājjīābād-e Mīr Ḩoseynī; also known as Ḩājjīābād) is a village in Aliabad Rural District, in the Central District of Anbarabad County, Kerman Province, Iran. At the 2006 census, its population was 533, in 110 families.
