= Hajjiabad, Behabad =

Hajjiabad حاجي اباد
- Village
- Location within Iran
- Coordinates: 31°54′00″N 56°01′12″E
- Country: Iran
- Province: Yazd
- County: Behabad
- Bakhsh: Central
- Rural District: Jolgeh

Population (2006)
  - Total: 19
- Time zone: UTC+3:30 (IRST)
  - Summer (DST): UTC+4:30 (IRDT)

Hajjiabad (Persian: حاجي اباد, also Romanized as Ḩājjīābād) is a village in Jolgeh Rural District, in the Central District of Behabad County, Yazd Province, Iran. At the 2006 census, its population was 19, in 6 families.
