= Hajiabad, Pakistan =

Coordinates: 34.403°N 71.926°E

Hajiabad is a town in Kotli District, Azad Kashmir, Pakistan. It is located on the Holar-Kotli road, and is a midway point for the travellers coming from Rawalpindi and Islamabad.
