= Hajjiabad, Lamerd =

Hajjiabad حاجي اباد
- Village
- Location within Iran
- Coordinates: 27°26′59″N 53°23′30″E
- Country: Iran
- Province: Fars
- County: Lamerd
- Bakhsh: Central
- Rural District: Chah Varz

Population (2006)
  - Total: 334
- Time zone: UTC+3:30 (IRST)
  - Summer (DST): UTC+4:30 (IRDT)

Hajjiabad (Persian: حاجي اباد, also Romanized as Ḩājjīābād) is a village in Chah Varz Rural District, in the Central District of Lamerd County, Fars province, Iran. In the 2006 census, its population was 334, with 72 families.
