= Hajjiabad, Sahray-ye Bagh =

Hajjiabad حاجي اباد
- Village
- Location within Iran
- Coordinates: 27°28′43″N 53°59′39″E
- Country: Iran
- Province: Fars
- County: Larestan
- Bakhsh: Sahray-ye Bagh
- Rural District: Sahray-ye Bagh

Population (2006)
  - Total: 87
- Time zone: UTC+3:30 (IRST)
  - Summer (DST): UTC+4:30 (IRDT)

Hajjiabad (Persian: حاجي اباد, also Romanized as Ḩājjīābād) is a village in Sahray-ye Bagh Rural District, Sahray-ye Bagh District, Larestan County, Fars province, Iran. At the 2006 census, its population was 87, in 18 families.
