= Hajjiabad-e Korbal =

Hajjiabad-e Korbal حاجي ابادكربال
- Village
- Location within Iran
- Coordinates: 29°33′13″N 53°22′00″E
- Country: Iran
- Province: Fars
- County: Kharameh
- Bakhsh: Central
- Rural District: Sofla

Population (2006)
  - Total: 172
- Time zone: UTC+3:30 (IRST)
  - Summer (DST): UTC+4:30 (IRDT)

Hajjiabad-e Korbal (Persian: حاجي ابادكربال, also Romanized as Ḩājjīābād-e Korbāl and Haji Abad Korbal; also known as Ḩājjīābād and Ḩajīābād) is a village in Sofla Rural District, in the Central District of Kharameh County, Fars province, Iran. At the 2006 census, its population was 172, in 45 families.
