= Hajjiabad, Fariman =

Hajjiabad حاجي اباد
- Village
- Location within Iran
- Coordinates: 35°57′19″N 59°45′49″E
- Country: Iran
- Province: Razavi Khorasan
- County: Fariman
- Bakhsh: Central
- Rural District: Sang Bast

Population (2006)
  - Total: 107
- Time zone: UTC+3:30 (IRST)
  - Summer (DST): UTC+4:30 (IRDT)

Hajjiabad (Persian: حاجي اباد, also Romanized as Ḩājjīābād) is a village in Sang Bast Rural District, in the Central District of Fariman County, Razavi Khorasan province, Iran. At the 2006 census, its population was 107, in 26 families.
