= Hajjiabad, Jahrom =

Hajjiabad حاجی‌آباد
- Village
- Location within Iran
- Coordinates: 28°35′47″N 53°39′45″E
- Country: Iran
- Province: Fars
- County: Jahrom
- Bakhsh: Central
- Rural District: Jolgah

Population (2006)
  - Total: 30
- Time zone: UTC+3:30 (IRST)
  - Summer (DST): UTC+4:30 (IRDT)

Hajjiabad (Persian: حاجی‌آباد, also Romanized as Ḩājjīābād and Hājiābād) is a village in Jolgah Rural District, in the Central District of Jahrom County, Fars province, Iran. At the 2006 census, its population was 30, in 5 families.
