= Hajjiabad-e Nazri =

Hajjiabad-e Nazri حاجي ابادنظري
- Village
- Location within Iran
- Coordinates: 30°20′13″N 56°54′36″E
- Country: Iran
- Province: Kerman
- County: Kerman
- Bakhsh: Central
- Rural District: Ekhtiarabad

Population (2006)
  - Total: 1,949
- Time zone: UTC+3:30 (IRST)
  - Summer (DST): UTC+4:30 (IRDT)

Hajjiabad-e Nazri (Persian: حاجي ابادنظري, also Romanized as Ḩājjīābād-e Naẓrī; also known as Shahrak-e Shahīd Bāhonar (Persian: شهرك شهيدباهنر) and Shahīdbāhonar) is a village in Ekhtiarabad Rural District, in the Central District of Kerman County, Kerman Province, Iran. At the 2006 census, its population was 1,949, in 481 families.
