= Hajjiabad, Maskun =

Hajjiabad حاجي اباد
- Village
- Country: Iran
- Province: Kerman
- County: Jiroft
- Bakhsh: Jebalbarez
- Rural District: Maskun

Population (2006)
  - Total: 9
- Time zone: UTC+3:30 (IRST)
  - Summer (DST): UTC+4:30 (IRDT)

Hajjiabad (Persian: حاجي اباد, also Romanized as Ḩājjīābād) is a village in Maskun Rural District, Jebalbarez District, Jiroft County, Kerman province, Iran. At the 2006 census, its population was 9, in 5 families.
