= Hajjiabad, Bazoft =

Hajjiabad حاجي اباد
- Village
- Location within Iran
- Coordinates: 32°13′00″N 50°14′53″E
- Country: Iran
- Province: Chaharmahal and Bakhtiari
- County: Kuhrang
- Bakhsh: Bazoft
- Rural District: Doab

Population (2006)
  - Total: 74
- Time zone: UTC+3:30 (IRST)
  - Summer (DST): UTC+4:30 (IRDT)

Hajjiabad (Persian: حاجي اباد, also Romanized as Ḩājjīābād) is a village in Doab Rural District, Bazoft District, Kuhrang County, Chaharmahal and Bakhtiari province, Iran. At the 2006 census, its population was 74, in 14 families. The village is populated by Lurs.
