= Hajjiabad-e Pas Kuhak =

Hajjiabad-e Pas Kuhak حاجي ابادپس كوهك
- Village
- Location within Iran
- Coordinates: 29°56′06″N 52°02′43″E
- Country: Iran
- Province: Fars
- County: Shiraz
- Bakhsh: Arzhan
- Rural District: Qarah Chaman

Population (2006)
  - Total: 32
- Time zone: UTC+3:30 (IRST)
  - Summer (DST): UTC+4:30 (IRDT)

Hajjiabad-e Pas Kuhak (Persian: حاجي ابادپس كوهك, also Romanized as Ḩājjīābād-e Pas Kūhak; also known as Ḩājjīābād) is a village in Qarah Chaman Rural District, Arzhan District, Shiraz County, Fars province, Iran. At the 2006 census, its population was 32, in 9 families.
