= Hajjiabad-e Sarhadi =

Hajjiabad-e Sarhadi حاجي آباد سرحدي
- Village
- Country: Iran
- Province: Hormozgan
- County: Bashagard
- Bakhsh: Gafr and Parmon
- Rural District: Gafr and Parmon

Population (2006)
  - Total: 247
- Time zone: UTC+3:30 (IRST)
  - Summer (DST): UTC+4:30 (IRDT)

Hajjiabad-e Sarhadi (Persian: حاجي آباد سرحدي, also Romanized as Ḩājjīābād-e Sarḥadī) is a village in Gafr and Parmon Rural District, Gafr and Parmon District, Bashagard County, Hormozgan Province, Iran. At the 2006 census, its population was 247, in 62 families.
