= Goli Suyi =

Goli Suyi گلي سويي
- Village
- Location within Iran
- Coordinates: 38°03′00″N 44°49′00″E
- Country: Iran
- Province: West Azerbaijan
- County: Urmia
- Bakhsh: Sumay-ye Beradust
- Rural District: Sumay-ye Shomali

Population (2006)
  - Total: 42
- Time zone: UTC+3:30 (IRST)
  - Summer (DST): UTC+4:30 (IRDT)

Goli Suyi (Persian: گلي سويي, also Romanized as Golī Sūyī; also known as Ḩājjīābād) is a village in Sumay-ye Shomali Rural District, Sumay-ye Beradust District, Urmia County, West Azerbaijan Province, Iran. At the 2006 census its population was 42, in 6 families.
