= Milab =

Milab ميلاب
- Village
- Location within Iran
- Coordinates: 34°03′10″N 48°28′47″E
- Country: Iran
- Province: Hamadan
- County: Nahavand
- Bakhsh: Central
- Rural District: Gamasiyab

Population (2006)
  - Total: 651
- Time zone: UTC+3:30 (IRST)
  - Summer (DST): UTC+4:30 (IRDT)

Milab (Persian: ميلاب, also Romanized as Mīlāb; also known as Ḩājīābād, Ḩājjīābād, and Ḩājjīābād-e Mīlāb) is a village in Gamasiyab Rural District, in the Central District of Nahavand County, Hamadan Province, Iran. At the 2006 census, its population was 651, in 181 families.
