= Hajjiabad, Rudan =

Hajjiabad حاجي اباد
- Village
- Location within Iran
- Coordinates: 27°47′28″N 57°10′35″E
- Country: Iran
- Province: Hormozgan
- County: Rudan
- Bakhsh: Central
- Rural District: Faryab

Population (2006)
  - Total: 555
- Time zone: UTC+3:30 (IRST)
  - Summer (DST): UTC+4:30 (IRDT)

Hajjiabad (Persian: حاجي اباد, also Romanized as Ḩājjīābād) is a village in Faryab Rural District, in the Central District of Rudan County, Hormozgan Province, Iran. At the 2006 census, its population was 555, in 112 families.
