= Behta Hajipur =

- Census town
- Location in Uttar Pradesh, India
- Coordinates: 28°43′32″N 77°18′15″E
- Country: India
- State: Uttar Pradesh
- District: Ghaziabad

Population (2001)
  - Total: 94,414

Languages
  - Official: Hindi
- Time zone: UTC+5:30 (IST)

Behta Hajipur is a census town in the Loni block of Ghaziabad district in the Indian state of Uttar Pradesh. It is a part of the National Capital Region (NCR). At one end (southwest), the town's boundary terminates at National Highway 709B, which connects Delhi to Saharanpur, and at the other end (northeast), the boundary ends at Loni-Ghaziabad Road. It also share its territories with the neighboring census town, Mandoli.

== Demographics ==
As of 2001 India census, Behta Hajipur had a population of 94,414, out of which 54% were males and 46% were females. Behta Hajipur has an average literacy rate of 60%, which is higher than the national average of 59.5%; with 62% of the males and 38% of females being literate. Around 19% of the population is under 6 years of age.

== Administration ==
The administration of Behta Hajipur comes under Loni Nagar Palika, Uttar Pradesh. In Lok Sabha, Behta Hazipur falls in the Ghazibad Lok sabha constituency. In the legislative assembly of Uttar Pradesh, the census town comes under the Loni Assembly constituency. It is currently represented by the politician, Nand Kishor Gurjar of the BJP.

== Connectivity and Transportation Facilities ==
Behta Hazipur can be reached by road, rail, and air. By road. The town has a halt railway station (Code: BHHZ) through which many passenger trains pass at regular intervals daily. By road, Behta Hazipur is well connected to the capital city of Delhi as well as other cities in Uttar Pradesh, including Noida, Hapur, Modinagar, Bulandshahr, Meerut, Saharanpur, Haridwar, etc. A large number of people commute from here to Delhi, Noida, Greater Noida, and Gurgaon every day for work. The nearest metro station, Johri Enclave is around 2.5 km away. The town is roughly 34 km and 8 km away from Indira Gandhi International Airport and Hindon Airport, respectively.

== Religion ==
While Hindu and Islam are the main religions of Behta Hazipur, Sikhs, Jains, and Christians also reside in the town. The town is dotted with many temples and mosques, including Purana Shiv Mandir, Arya Samaj Mandir, Sanatan Mandir, Purnagiri Mandir, Siddh Baba Mandir, and Guru Gorakhnath Mandir.

== Infrastructural Amenities ==
Being a census town, Behta Hazipur has almost all the basic infrastructural facilities, including hospitals, schools, restaurants, banks, hotels, event venues, markets, among other things. The town has a post office. Major educational institutions here are Adarsh Nav Jeevan Inter College, Behta Inter College, Kanya Vaidic Vidyapeeth, New Green Valley Public School, CCS Vidya Mandir Girls Inter College. The town has a cinema hall, called Kavita Palace. Famous hospitals in Behta Hazipur are Shri Krishna Multi-Specialty Hospital and City Hospital. Besides, the town has ample accommodation and dining facilities as it has many street-side eateries, restaurants, and hotels. Several daily, as well as weekly flea and fresh produce markets, can also be found at various locations within the town.
