= Hajjiabad, Kermanshah =

Hajjiabad حاجي اباد
- Village
- Location within Iran
- Coordinates: 34°20′24″N 47°21′05″E
- Country: Iran
- Province: Kermanshah
- County: Kermanshah
- Bakhsh: Central
- Rural District: Dorudfaraman

Population (2006)
  - Total: 416
- Time zone: UTC+3:30 (IRST)
  - Summer (DST): UTC+4:30 (IRDT)

Hajjiabad (Persian: حاجي اباد, also Romanized as Ḩājjīābād and Ḩājīābād; also known as Haji Abad Darroofaraman and Ḩājjīābād-e Darūfarāmān) is a village in Dorudfaraman Rural District, in the Central District of Kermanshah County, Kermanshah Province, Iran. At the 2006 census, its population was 416, in 107 families.
