= Hajjiabad, Sarvelayat =

Hajjiabad حاجي اباد
- Village
- Location within Iran
- Coordinates: 36°39′30″N 58°23′37″E
- Country: Iran
- Province: Razavi Khorasan
- County: Nishapur
- Bakhsh: Sarvelayat
- Rural District: Sarvelayat

Population (2006)
  - Total: 139
- Time zone: UTC+3:30 (IRST)
  - Summer (DST): UTC+4:30 (IRDT)

Hajjiabad (Persian: حاجي اباد, also Romanized as Ḩājjīābād) is a village in Sarvelayat Rural District, Sarvelayat District, Nishapur County, Razavi Khorasan Province, Iran. At the 2006 census, its population was 139, in 49 families.
