= Hajjiabad-e Hajj Ali Mohammad =

Hajjiabad-e Hajj Ali Mohammad حاجي اباد حاج علي محمد
- Village
- Location within Iran
- Coordinates: 28°38′25″N 59°06′56″E
- Country: Iran
- Province: Kerman
- County: Fahraj
- Bakhsh: Negin Kavir
- Rural District: Chahdegal

Population (2006)
  - Total: 243
- Time zone: UTC+3:30 (IRST)
  - Summer (DST): UTC+4:30 (IRDT)

Hajjiabad-e Hajj Ali Mohammad (Persian: حاجي اباد حاج علي محمد, also Romanized as Ḩājjīābād-e Ḩājj ʿAlī Moḩammad; also known as Ḩājjīābād) is a village in Chahdegal Rural District, Negin Kavir District, Fahraj County, Kerman Province, Iran. At the 2006 census, its population was 243, in 64 families.
