= Hajjiabad, Abyek =

Hajjiabad حاجي اباد
- Village
- Location within Iran
- Coordinates: 36°13′15″N 50°26′16″E
- Country: Iran
- Province: Qazvin
- County: Abyek
- Bakhsh: Central
- Rural District: Kuhpayeh-e Sharqi

Population (2006)
  - Total: 67
- Time zone: UTC+3:30 (IRST)
  - Summer (DST): UTC+4:30 (IRDT)

Hajjiabad (Persian: حاجي اباد, also Romanized as Ḩājjīābād and Hājī Ābād) is a village in Kuhpayeh-e Sharqi Rural District, in the Central District of Abyek County, Qazvin Province, Iran. At the 2006 census, its population was 67, in 29 families.
