= Hajjiabad, East Azerbaijan =

Hajjiabad حاجي اباد
- Village
- Location within Iran
- Coordinates: 36°49′06″N 46°56′43″E
- Country: Iran
- Province: East Azerbaijan
- County: Charuymaq
- Bakhsh: Central
- Rural District: Charuymaq-e Jonubegharbi

Population (2006)
  - Total: 41
- Time zone: UTC+3:30 (IRST)
  - Summer (DST): UTC+4:30 (IRDT)

Hajjiabad (Persian: حاجي اباد, also Romanized as Ḩājjīābād) is a village in Charuymaq-e Jonubegharbi Rural District, in the Central District of Charuymaq County, East Azerbaijan province, Iran. At the 2006 census, its population was 41, in 9 families.
