= Hajjiabad-e Yek =

Hajjiabad-e Yek حاجي اباديك
- Village
- Location within Iran
- Coordinates: 34°30′14″N 47°51′35″E
- Country: Iran
- Province: Kermanshah
- County: Kangavar
- Bakhsh: Central
- Rural District: Qazvineh

Population (2006)
  - Total: 62
- Time zone: UTC+3:30 (IRST)
  - Summer (DST): UTC+4:30 (IRDT)

Hajjiabad-e Yek (Persian: حاجي اباديك, also Romanized as Ḩājjīābād-e Yek; also known as Ḩājjīābād) is a village in Qazvineh Rural District, in the Central District of Kangavar County, Kermanshah Province, Iran. At the 2006 census, its population was 62, in 15 families.
