= Hajjiabad, Marvast =

Hajjiabad حاجي اباد
- Village
- Country: Iran
- Province: Yazd
- County: Khatam
- Bakhsh: Marvast
- Rural District: Harabarjan

Population (2006)
  - Total: 16
- Time zone: UTC+3:30 (IRST)
  - Summer (DST): UTC+4:30 (IRDT)

Hajjiabad (Persian: حاجي اباد, also Romanized as Ḩājjīābād) is a village in Harabarjan Rural District, Marvast District, Khatam County, Yadz province, Iran. At the 2006 census, its population was 16, in 6 families.
