= Shahla (given name) =

- Gender: female

Origin
- Region of origin: Muslim world

Shahla (Arabic: شَهْلَاء [ALA-LC: Shahlāʼ]; Azerbaijani: Şəhla; Bengali: শাহলা; Indonesian: Syahla; Persian: شَهلا; Tajik: Шаҳло; Urdu: شَہلا; Uzbek: Shahlo) is a feminine given name used throughout the Muslim world.

It is based on the feminine form of the Arabic adjective أَشْهَل (ʾašhal) in the sense "whose eyes have شُهْلَة (šuhla)", which is said to have meant "a blue or greenish hue" in Classical Arabic, or "black with some blueness in them" (navy blue color). Some sources also say "black with redness" (i.e. very dark maroon). Others say the name means "dark-grey-eyed", "hazel-eyed", or simply "who has beautiful eyes".

The colloquial Arabic spelling of the name omits the hamza (as is usually the case when the hamza is in final position), thus rendering شهلا, with the stress on the first syllable. Incidentally, omission of the final hamza is also the standard in Persian and Urdu.

Alternate transcriptions include: Chahla, Chahlaa, Chehla, Chehlaa, Shehla, Shehlaa, Shahlaa.

== People ==
=== Shahla ===
- Shahla Aghapour, Iranian artist, author and gallery director
- Shahla Arbabi (born 1945), Iranian-born American artist
- Shahla Ata (1959–2015), Afghan politician
- Shahla Behrouzirad (born 1985), Iranian paracanoer
- Shahla Habibi (1958–2017), Iranian advisor
- Shahla Humbatova, Azerbaijani human rights lawyer
- Shahla Jahed (1970–2010), Iranian nurse
- Shahla Khatun, Bangladeshi physician and professor
- Shahla Lahiji (1942–2024), Iranian writer, publisher, translator, and publishing house director
- Shahla Riahi (1927–2019), Iranian actress and film director
- Shahla S. Sabet (born 1946), Iranian and American judge, and lawyer
- Shahla Sherkat (born 1956), Iranian journalist, author, and activist
- Shahla Ujayli (born 1976), Syrian writer
- Shahla Safi Zamir (1948–2020), Iranian singer
- Shahla Zia (1947–2005), Pakistani lawyer and activist

=== Chahla ===
- Chahla Benmokhtar (born 1997), Algerian volleyball player
- Chahla Chafiq (born 1954), Iranian writer and sociologist

=== Shahlo ===
- Shahlo Mahmudova, Uzbekistani politician

=== Shehla ===
- Shehla Gill (born 1960), Pakistani actress
- Shehla Masood (1973–2011), Indian environmentalist, wildlife and Right to Information activist
- Shehla Pervin, Indian-American breast cancer specialist
- Shehla Rashid (born 1988), Indian human rights activist
- Shehla Raza (born 1964), Pakistani politician

== See also ==
- Shahla (disambiguation)
