= Hajjiabad, Minab =

Hajjiabad حاجي اباد
- Village
- Location within Iran
- Coordinates: 27°10′32″N 56°55′33″E
- Country: Iran
- Province: Hormozgan
- County: Minab
- Bakhsh: Central
- Rural District: Tiab

Population (2006)
  - Total: 748
- Time zone: UTC+3:30 (IRST)
  - Summer (DST): UTC+4:30 (IRDT)

Hajjiabad (Persian: حاجي اباد, also Romanized as Ḩājjīābād; also known as Ḩājīābād) is a village in Tiab Rural District, in the Central District of Minab County, Hormozgan Province, Iran. At the 2006 census, its population was 748, in 146 families.
