= Hajjiabad-e Bala =

Hajjiabad-e Bala حاجي ابادبالا
- Village
- Location within Iran
- Coordinates: 31°41′24″N 53°51′00″E
- Country: Iran
- Province: Yazd
- County: Taft
- Bakhsh: Central
- Rural District: Aliabad

Population (2006)
  - Total: 14
- Time zone: UTC+3:30 (IRST)
  - Summer (DST): UTC+4:30 (IRDT)

Hajjiabad-e Bala (Persian: حاجي ابادبالا, also Romanized as Ḩājjīābād-e Bālā) is a village in Aliabad Rural District, in the Central District of Taft County, Yazd province, Iran. At the 2006 census, its population was 14, in 5 families.
