= Hajjiabad, Urmia =

Hajjiabad حاجي اباد
- Village
- Location within Iran
- Coordinates: 37°39′10″N 45°00′48″E
- Country: Iran
- Province: West Azerbaijan
- County: Urmia
- Bakhsh: Nazlu
- Rural District: Nazluchay

Population (2006)
  - Total: 378
- Time zone: UTC+3:30 (IRST)
  - Summer (DST): UTC+4:30 (IRDT)

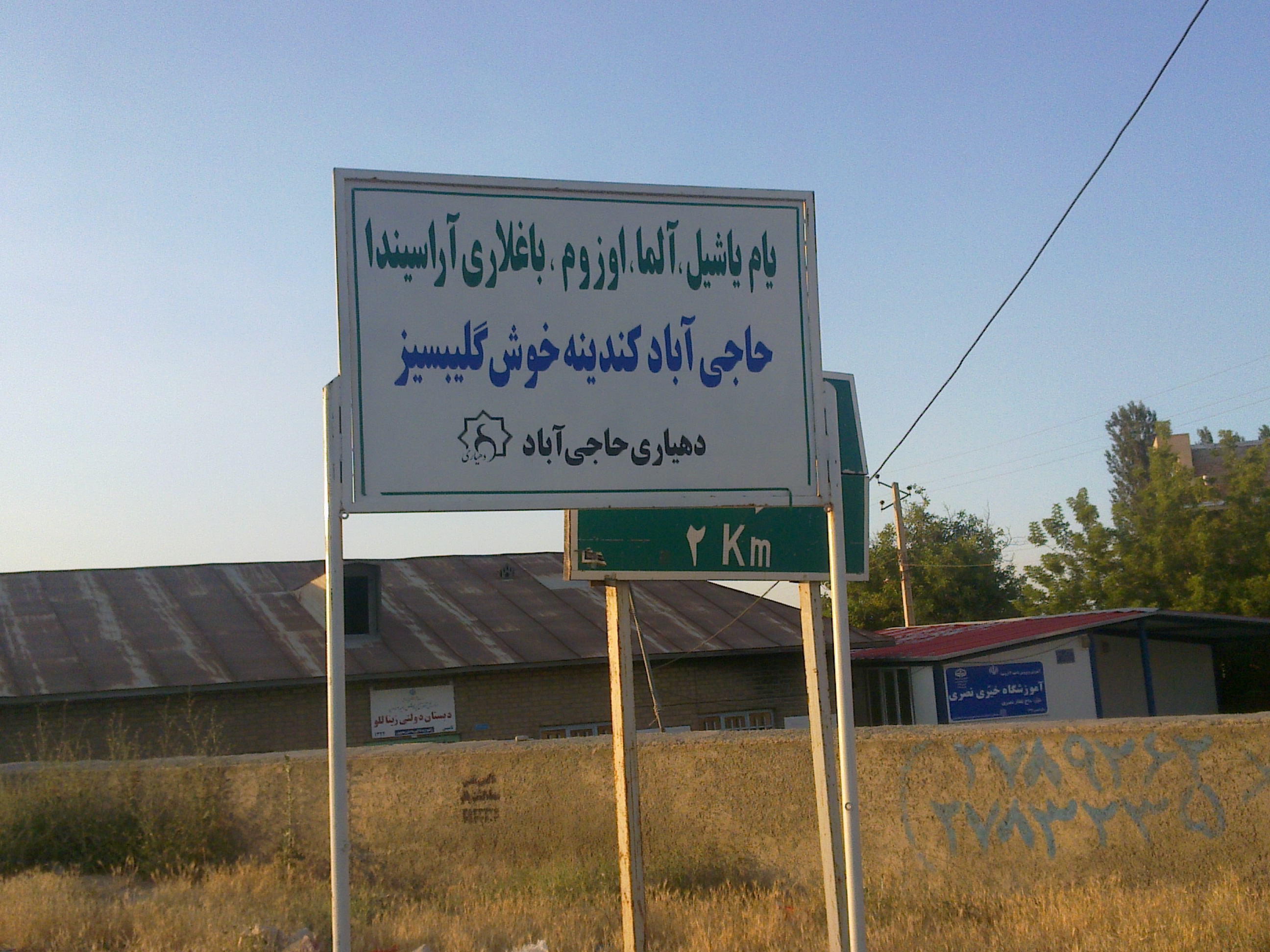
Road sign at the entrance of Haajiibad

Hajjiabad (Persian: حاجي اباد, also Romanized as Ḩājjīābād) is a village in Nazluchay Rural District, Nazlu District, Urmia County, West Azerbaijan Province, Iran. At the 2006 census, its population was 378, in 97 families.
