= Hajjiabad, Khomeyn =

Hajjiabad حاجي اباد
- Village
- Location within Iran
- Coordinates: 33°44′01″N 50°08′43″E
- Country: Iran
- Province: Markazi
- County: Khomeyn
- Bakhsh: Central
- Rural District: Salehan

Population (2006)
  - Total: 40
- Time zone: UTC+3:30 (IRST)
  - Summer (DST): UTC+4:30 (IRDT)

Hajjiabad (Persian: حاجي اباد, also Romanized as Ḩājjīābād; also known as Ḩājīābād-e Yūjān, Ḩājjīābād-e Yūjān, and Qal‘eh Now) is a village in Salehan Rural District, in the Central District of Khomeyn County, Markazi Province, Iran. At the 2006 census, its population was 40, in 11 families.
