= Hajjiabad, Kuhrang =

Hajjiabad حاجي اباد
- Village
- Location within Iran
- Coordinates: 32°30′05″N 50°15′02″E
- Country: Iran
- Province: Chaharmahal and Bakhtiari
- County: Kuhrang
- Bakhsh: Central
- Rural District: Dasht-e Zarrin

Population (2006)
  - Total: 32
- Time zone: UTC+3:30 (IRST)
  - Summer (DST): UTC+4:30 (IRDT)

Hajjiabad (Persian: حاجي اباد, also Romanized as Ḩājjīābād and Hājīābād) is a village in Dasht-e Zarrin Rural District, in the Central District of Kuhrang County, Chaharmahal and Bakhtiari province, Iran. At the 2006 census, its population was 32, in five families. The village is populated by Lurs.
