= Hajjiabad, Jask =

Hajjiabad حاجي آباد
- Village
- Location within Iran
- Coordinates: 25°41′44″N 58°45′02″E
- Country: Iran
- Province: Hormozgan
- County: Jask
- Bakhsh: Central
- Rural District: Gabrik

Population (2006)
  - Total: 62
- Time zone: UTC+3:30 (IRST)
  - Summer (DST): UTC+4:30 (IRDT)

Hajjiabad (Persian: حاجي آباد, also Romanized as Ḩājjīābād; also known as Ḩājīābād) is a village in Gabrik Rural District, in the Central District of Jask County, Hormozgan province, Iran. At the 2006 census, its population was 62, in 14 families.
