= Hajjiabad, Chang Almas =

Hajjiabad حاجی‌آباد
- Village
- Location within Iran
- Coordinates: 35°30′47″N 47°39′01″E
- Country: Iran
- Province: Kurdistan
- County: Bijar
- Bakhsh: Chang Almas
- Rural District: Khosrowabad

Population (2006)
  - Total: 59
- Time zone: UTC+3:30 (IRST)
  - Summer (DST): UTC+4:30 (IRDT)

Hajjiabad (Persian: حاجی‌آباد, also Romanized as Ḩājjīābād and Ḩājīābād) is a village in Khosrowabad Rural District, Chang Almas District, Bijar County, Kurdistan province, Iran. At the 2006 census, its population was 59, in 12 families. The village is populated by Kurds.
