= Gol Dulatshahi =

Gol Dulatshahi گل دولتشاهي
- Village
- Location within Iran
- Coordinates: 33°46′55″N 48°16′50″E
- Country: Iran
- Province: Lorestan
- County: Selseleh
- Bakhsh: Central
- Rural District: Honam

Population (2006)
  - Total: 203
- Time zone: UTC+3:30 (IRST)
  - Summer (DST): UTC+4:30 (IRDT)

Gol Dulatshahi (Persian: گل دولتشاهي, also Romanized as Gol Dūlatshāhī; also known as Ḩājjīābād) is a village in Honam Rural District, in the Central District of Selseleh County, Lorestan Province, Iran. At the 2006 census, its population was 203, in 37 families.
