= Hajjiabad, Jam =

Hajjiabad حاجي اباد
- Village
- Location within Iran
- Coordinates: 27°50′28″N 52°18′27″E
- Country: Iran
- Province: Bushehr
- County: Jam
- Bakhsh: Central
- Rural District: Jam

Population (2006)
  - Total: 307
- Time zone: UTC+3:30 (IRST)
  - Summer (DST): UTC+4:30 (IRDT)

Hajjiabad (Persian: حاجي اباد, also Romanized as Ḩājjīābād and Ḩājīābād) is a village in Jam Rural District, in the Central District of Jam County, Bushehr province, Iran. At the 2006 census, its population was 307, in 64 families.
