= Hajipurwadi =

Village in Maharashtra

- town
- Location in Vaijapur Taluka, India Hajipurwadi (India)
- Coordinates: 20.057614°N 74.8980604°E
- Country: India
- State: Maharashtra
- District: Aurangabad

Area
  - Total: 9.658700 km^{2} (3.729245 sq mi)

Population
  - Total: 1,560
  - Density: 162/km^{2} (418/sq mi)

Languages
  - Official: Marathi
  - Local: Hindi
- Time zone: UTC+5:30 (IST)
- PIN: 431116
- Vehicle registration: MH

Hajipurwadi is a village located in Vaijapur Taluka of Aurangabad district, Maharashtra with a total of 340 families residing in it. The Hajipurwadi village has population of 1560, of which 804 are males while 756 are females as per Population Census 2011. As per constitution of India and Panchyati Raaj Act, Hajipurwadi village is administrated by Sarpanch (Head of Village) who is elected representative of village.

== Nearest Villages ==
- Nalegaon ( 4 km )
- Bhatana ( 6 km )
- Garaj ( 7 km )
- Pokhari ( 8 km )
- Sakegaon ( 9 km )
