= Hajjiabad, Kakavand =

Hajjiabad حاجي آباد
- Village
- Location within Iran
- Coordinates: 34°11′02″N 47°45′27″E
- Country: Iran
- Province: Lorestan
- County: Delfan
- Bakhsh: Kakavand
- Rural District: Kakavand-e Sharqi

Population (2006)
  - Total: 43
- Time zone: UTC+3:30 (IRST)
  - Summer (DST): UTC+4:30 (IRDT)

Hajjiabad (Persian: حاجي آباد, also Romanized as Ḩājjīābād) is a village in Kakavand-e Sharqi Rural District, Kakavand District, Delfan County, Lorestan Province, Iran. At the 2006 census, its population was 43, in 10 families.
