= Patli Hajipur =

- Village
- Location in Haryana, India Patli Hajipur (India)
- Coordinates: 28°24′59″N 76°51′31″E
- Country: India
- State: Haryana
- District: Gurgaon

Government
  - Type: Gram Panchayat

Area
  - Total: 12.40 km^{2} (4.79 sq mi)

Population (2011)
  - Total: 4,070
  - Density: 328/km^{2} (850/sq mi)

Languages
  - Official: Hindi
- Time zone: UTC+5:30 (IST)
- PIN: 122506
- Telephone code: 0124
- ISO 3166 code: IN-HR
- Vehicle registration: HR
- Lok Sabha constituency: Gurgaon
- Vidhan Sabha constituency: Badshahpur
- Website: haryana.gov.in

Patli Hajipur is a village in Gurgaon district of the Indian state of Haryana. It is located in Faruknagar taluk. As of 2011, the village had a population of 4070 spread across 783 households. Women formed 47.9% of the population. It is a Jat village of Dhankhar Khap.
