= Hajiabad, Jahrom =

Hajiabad حاجی‌آباد
- Village
- Location within Iran
- Coordinates: 28°40′41.27″N 53°33′13.56″E
- Country: Iran
- Province: Fars
- County: Jahrom
- Bakhsh: Kordian
- Rural District: Qotbabad

Population (2016)
  - Total: 103
- Time zone: UTC+3:30 (IRST)
  - Summer (DST): UTC+4:30 (IRDT)

Hajiabad (Persian: حاجی‌آباد) is a village in Qotbabad Rural District, Kordian District, Jahrom County, Fars province, Iran. At the 2016 census, its population was 103, in 30 families.
