= Hajjiabad, Saduq =

Hajjiabad حاجي اباد
- Village
- Location within Iran
- Coordinates: 32°08′38″N 54°10′31″E
- Country: Iran
- Province: Yazd
- County: Saduq
- Bakhsh: Central
- Rural District: Rostaq

Population (2006)
  - Total: 29
- Time zone: UTC+3:30 (IRST)
  - Summer (DST): UTC+4:30 (IRDT)

Hajjiabad (Persian: حاجي اباد, also Romanized as Ḩājjīābād and Hājīābād) is a village in Rostaq Rural District, in the Central District of Saduq County, Yadz province, Iran. At the 2006 census, its population was 29, in 10 families.
