= Pain Velayat Rural District (Kashmar County) =

Rural district in Razavi Khorasan province, Iran

Pain Velayat Rural District Persian: دهستان پائين ولايت
- Rural District
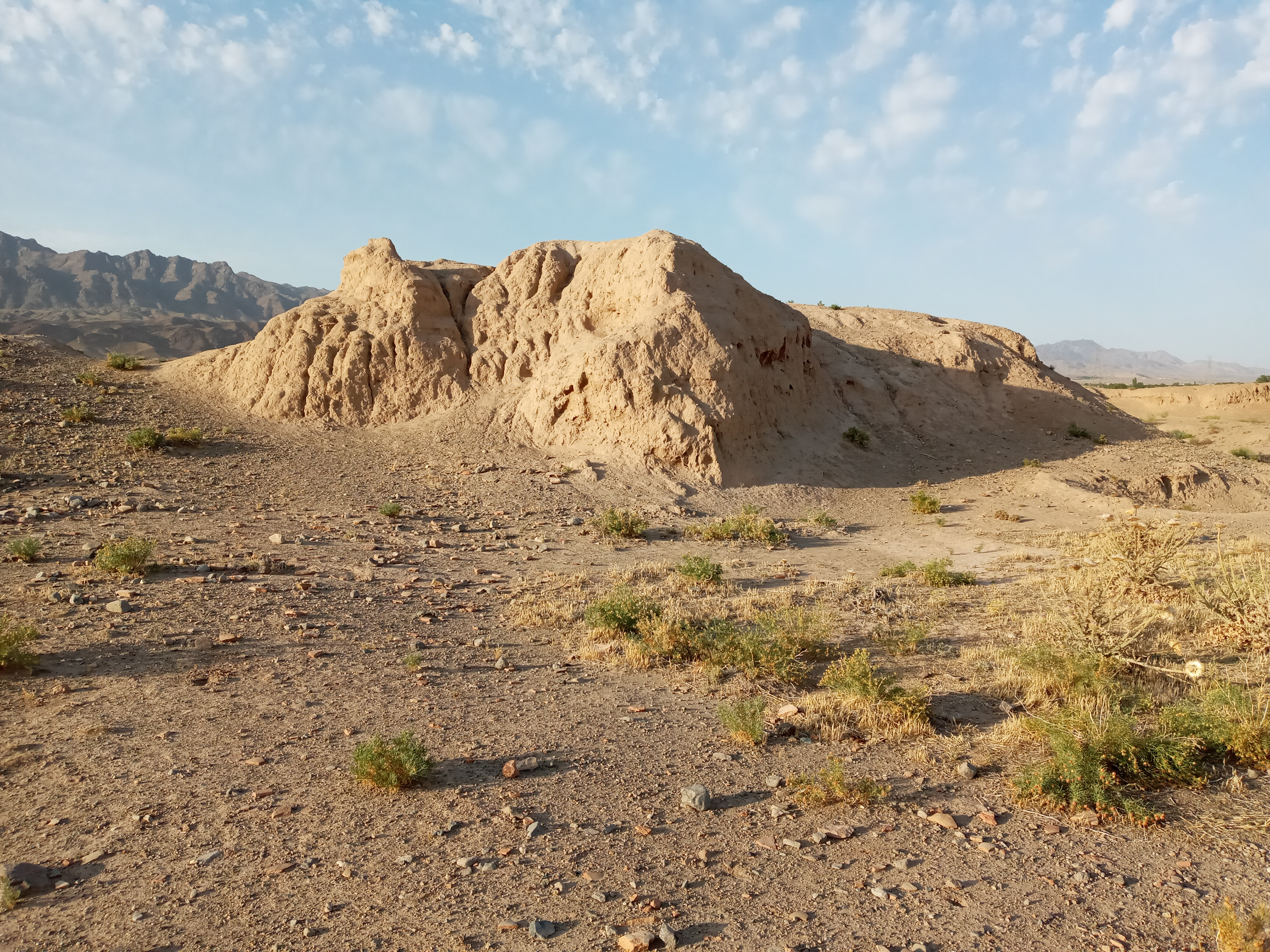
- Qaleh-ye Dozd

- Location within Iran
- Coordinates: 35°17′N 58°28′E
- Country: Iran
- Province: Razavi Khorasan
- County: Kashmar
- District: Central
- Established: 1987
- Capital: Kasrineh

Population (2016)
  - Total: 12,758
- Time zone: UTC+3:30 (IRST)

Pain Velayat Rural District (Persian: دهستان پائين ولايت) is in the Central District of Kashmar County, Razavi Khorasan province, Iran. Its capital is the village of Kasrineh.

== Demographics ==
=== Population ===
At the time of the 2006 National Census, the rural district's population was 11,399 in 3,144 households. There were 12,503 inhabitants in 3,816 households at the following census of 2011. The 2016 census measured the population of the rural district as 12,758 in 4,067 households. The most populous of its 60 villages was Moghan, with 2,516 people.

=== Other villages in the rural district ===
- Abkuh-e Aliabad
- Eshratabad
- Hajjiabad
- Kalateh-ye Ahmadi
- Kalateh-ye Mohammadabad
- Mohammadabad-e Andaleyb
- Mohammadiyeh
- Momrabad
- Sar Howzak
- Showkatiyeh
- Zendeh Jan
