= Hajjiabad, Khorramabad =

Hajjiabad حاجي آباد
- Village
- Location within Iran
- Coordinates: 33°37′22″N 48°34′45″E
- Country: Iran
- Province: Lorestan
- County: Khorramabad
- Bakhsh: Bayravand
- Rural District: Beyranvand-e Jonubi

Population (2006)
  - Total: 62
- Time zone: UTC+3:30 (IRST)
  - Summer (DST): UTC+4:30 (IRDT)

Hajjiabad (Persian: حاجي آباد, also Romanized as Ḩājjīābād; also known as Khargalān and Kharkalān) is a village in Beyranvand-e Jonubi Rural District, Bayravand District, Khorramabad County, Lorestan province, Iran. At the 2006 census, its population was 62, in 12 families.
