= Hajjiabad, Neyriz =

Hajjiabad حاجي اباد
- Village
- Location within Iran
- Coordinates: 29°12′24″N 54°09′12″E
- Country: Iran
- Province: Fars
- County: Neyriz
- Bakhsh: Central
- Rural District: Rostaq

Population (2006)
  - Total: 396
- Time zone: UTC+3:30 (IRST)
  - Summer (DST): UTC+4:30 (IRDT)

Hajjiabad (Persian: حاجي اباد, also Romanized as Ḩājjīābād and Hājīābād; also known as Hāiīābād) is a village in Rostaq Rural District, in the Central District of Neyriz County, Fars province, Iran. At the 2006 census, its population was 396, in 98 families.
