= Hajjiabad, Garizat =

Hajjiabad حاجي اباد
- Village
- Location within Iran
- Coordinates: 31°17′54″N 54°05′14″E
- Country: Iran
- Province: Yazd
- County: Taft
- Bakhsh: Nir
- Rural District: Garizat

Population (2006)
  - Total: 45
- Time zone: UTC+3:30 (IRST)
  - Summer (DST): UTC+4:30 (IRDT)

Hajjiabad (Persian: حاجي اباد, also Romanized as Ḩājjīābād; also known as ’ājjīābād) is a village in Garizat Rural District, Nir District, Taft County, Yadz province, Iran. At the 2006 census, its population was 45, in 12 families.
