= Hajjiabad, Kazerun =

Hajjiabad حاجي اباد
- Village
- Location within Iran
- Coordinates: 29°33′22″N 51°44′46″E
- Country: Iran
- Province: Fars
- County: Kazerun
- Bakhsh: Central
- Rural District: Balyan

Population (2006)
  - Total: 350
- Time zone: UTC+3:30 (IRST)
  - Summer (DST): UTC+4:30 (IRDT)

Hajjiabad (Persian: حاجي اباد, also Romanized as Ḩājjīābād and Ḩājīābād; also known as Ḩājjīābād-e Pol-e Ābgīneh) is a village in Balyan Rural District, in the Central District of Kazerun County, Fars province, Iran. At the 2006 census, its population was 350, in 72 families.
