= Hajji Pamoq =

Hajji Pamoq حاجي پمق
- Village
- Location within Iran
- Coordinates: 35°20′06″N 47°22′02″E
- Country: Iran
- Province: Kurdistan
- County: Dehgolan
- Bakhsh: Central
- Rural District: Howmeh-ye Dehgolan

Population (2006)
  - Total: 463
- Time zone: UTC+3:30 (IRST)
  - Summer (DST): UTC+4:30 (IRDT)

Hajji Pamoq (Persian: حاجي پمق, also Romanized as Ḩājjī Pamoq and Hājī Pamoq; also known as Ḩājīābād, Hajī Pamagh, Hājī Pa yī Mūgh, Ḩājjīābād, and Sarāb-e Ḩājjī Peymūq) is a village in Howmeh-ye Dehgolan Rural District, in the Central District of Dehgolan County, Kurdistan Province, Iran. At the 2006 census, its population was 463, in 109 families. The village is populated by Kurds.
