= Hajjiabad, Sepidan =

Hajjiabad حاجي اباد
- Village
- Location within Iran
- Coordinates: 30°03′01″N 52°25′43″E
- Country: Iran
- Province: Fars
- County: Sepidan
- Bakhsh: Beyza
- Rural District: Beyza

Population (2006)
  - Total: 476
- Time zone: UTC+3:30 (IRST)
  - Summer (DST): UTC+4:30 (IRDT)

Hajjiabad (Persian: حاجي اباد, also Romanized as Ḩājjīābād, Ḩajīābād, and Ḩājīābād) is a village in Beyza Rural District, Beyza District, Sepidan County, Fars province, Iran. At the 2006 census, its population was 476, in 114 families.
