= Hajjiabad, Shiraz =

Hajjiabad حاجي اباد
- Village
- Location within Iran
- Coordinates: 29°39′21″N 52°18′53″E
- Country: Iran
- Province: Fars
- County: Shiraz
- Bakhsh: Arzhan
- Rural District: Qarah Chaman

Population (2006)
  - Total: 331
- Time zone: UTC+3:30 (IRST)
  - Summer (DST): UTC+4:30 (IRDT)

Hajjiabad (Persian: حاجي اباد, also Romanized as Ḩājjīābād) is a village in Qarah Chaman Rural District, Arzhan District, Shiraz County, Fars province, Iran. At the 2006 census, its population was 331, in 71 families.
