= Hajjiabad-e Jadid =

Hajjiabad-e Jadid حاجي آباد جديد
- Village
- Location within Iran
- Coordinates: 34°12′39″N 47°48′32″E
- Country: Iran
- Province: Lorestan
- County: Delfan
- Bakhsh: Kakavand
- Rural District: Kakavand-e Sharqi

Population (2006)
  - Total: 15
- Time zone: UTC+3:30 (IRST)
  - Summer (DST): UTC+4:30 (IRDT)

Hajjiabad-e Jadid (Persian: حاجي آباد جديد, also Romanized as Ḩājjīābād-e Jadīd; also known simply as Ḩājjīābād) is a village in Kakavand-e Sharqi Rural District, Kakavand District, Delfan County, Lorestan Province, Iran. At the 2006 census, its population was 15, in 5 families.
