= Hajjiabad-e Payabi =

Hajjiabad-e Payabi حاجي ابادپايابي
- Village
- Location within Iran
- Coordinates: 27°35′27″N 57°52′10″E
- Country: Iran
- Province: Kerman
- County: Qaleh Ganj
- Bakhsh: Central
- Rural District: Qaleh Ganj

Population (2006)
  - Total: 33
- Time zone: UTC+3:30 (IRST)
  - Summer (DST): UTC+4:30 (IRDT)

Hajjiabad-e Payabi (Persian: حاجي ابادپايابي, also Romanized as Ḩājjīābād-e Pāyābī and Ḩājīābād-e Pāyābī) is a village in Qaleh Ganj Rural District, in the Central District of Qaleh Ganj County, German province, Iran. At the 2006 census, its population was 33, in 5 families.
