= Hajjiabad, Hemmatabad =

Hajjiabad حاجي اباد
- Village
- Location within Iran
- Coordinates: 33°52′11″N 48°42′06″E
- Country: Iran
- Province: Lorestan
- County: Borujerd
- Bakhsh: Central
- Rural District: Hemmatabad

Population (2006)
  - Total: 751
- Time zone: UTC+3:30 (IRST)
  - Summer (DST): UTC+4:30 (IRDT)

Hajjiabad (Persian: حاجي اباد, also Romanized as Ḩājjīābād and Ḩājīābād; also known as Ḩājjīābād-e Zereshkeh) is a village in Hemmatabad Rural District, in the Central District of Borujerd County, Lorestan Province, Iran. At the 2006 census, its population was 751, in 179 families.
