= Tol-e Gor-e Hajjiabad =

Tol-e Gor-e Hajjiabad تل گرحاجي اباد
- Village
- Location within Iran
- Coordinates: 30°08′00″N 52°02′00″E
- Country: Iran
- Province: Fars
- County: Sepidan
- Bakhsh: Hamaijan
- Rural District: Hamaijan

Population (2006)
  - Total: 112
- Time zone: UTC+3:30 (IRST)
  - Summer (DST): UTC+4:30 (IRDT)

Tol-e Gor-e Hajjiabad (Persian: تل گرحاجي اباد, also Romanized as Tol-e Gor-e Ḩājjīābād; also known as Ḥājjīābād and Tol-e Gor) is a village in Hamaijan Rural District, Hamaijan District, Sepidan County, Fars province, Iran. At the 2006 census, its population was 112, in 26 families.
