= Hajjiabad, Rudsar =

Hajjiabad حاجي اباد
- Village
- Location within Iran
- Coordinates: 37°02′21″N 50°18′27″E
- Country: Iran
- Province: Gilan
- County: Rudsar
- Bakhsh: Kelachay
- Rural District: Machian

Population (2006)
  - Total: 186
- Time zone: UTC+3:30 (IRST)
  - Summer (DST): UTC+4:30 (IRDT)

Hajjiabad (Persian: حاجي اباد, also Romanized as Ḩājjīābād) is a village in Machian Rural District, Kelachay District, Rudsar County, Gilan province, Iran. At the 2006 census, its population was 186, in 54 families.
