= Hajjiabad-e Mallu =

Hajjiabad-e Mallu حاجي ابادملو
- Village
- Location within Iran
- Coordinates: 27°24′01″N 53°01′15″E
- Country: Iran
- Province: Fars
- County: Mohr
- Bakhsh: Varavi
- Rural District: Khuzi

Population (2006)
  - Total: 81
- Time zone: UTC+3:30 (IRST)
  - Summer (DST): UTC+4:30 (IRDT)

Hajjiabad-e Mallu (Persian: حاجي ابادملو, also Romanized as Ḩājjīābād-e Mallū; also known as Tol-e Mallū-ye Bālā) is a village in Khuzi Rural District, Varavi District, Mohr County, Fars province, Iran. At the 2006 census, its population was 81, in 13 families.
