= Hajjiabad, Korani =

Hajjiabad حاجی آباد
- village
- Location within Iran
- Coordinates: 36°13′57″N 47°47′19″E
- Country: Iran
- Province: Kurdistan
- County: Bijar
- Bakhsh: Korani
- Rural District: Gorgin

Population (2006)
  - Total: 61
- Time zone: UTC+3:30 (IRST)
  - Summer (DST): UTC+4:30 (IRDT)

Hajjiabad (Persian: حاجی آباد, also Romanized as Ḩājjīābād) is a village in Gorgin Rural District, Korani District, Bijar County, Kurdistan province, Iran. At the 2006 census, its population was 61, in 20 families. The village is populated by Turkic speakers.
