= Hajjiabad, Selseleh =

Hajjiabad حاجي اباد
- Village
- Location within Iran
- Coordinates: 33°46′50″N 48°16′52″E
- Country: Iran
- Province: Lorestan
- County: Selseleh
- Bakhsh: Central
- Rural District: Qaleh-ye Mozaffari

Population (2006)
  - Total: 34
- Time zone: UTC+3:30 (IRST)
  - Summer (DST): UTC+4:30 (IRDT)

Hajjiabad (Persian: حاجي اباد, also Romanized as Ḩājjīābād; also known as Ḩājī Tāb, Ḩājj ‘Alī Beyk, and Ḩājjī Tāb) is a village in Qaleh-ye Mozaffari Rural District, in the Central District of Selseleh County, Lorestan Province, Iran. At the 2006 census, its population was 34, in 8 families.
