= Hajjiabad, Tangestan =

Hajjiabad حاجي اباد
- Village
- Location within Iran
- Coordinates: 28°47′58″N 51°04′17″E
- Country: Iran
- Province: Bushehr
- County: Tangestan
- Bakhsh: Delvar
- Rural District: Delvar

Population (2006)
  - Total: 115
- Time zone: UTC+3:30 (IRST)
  - Summer (DST): UTC+4:30 (IRDT)

Hajjiabad (Persian: حاجي اباد, also Romanized as Ḩājjīābād) is a village in Delvar Rural District, Delvar District, Tangestan County, Bushehr province, Iran. At the 2006 census, its population was 115, in 24 families.
