= Hajjiabad, Lahijan =

Hajjiabad حاجی آباد
- Neighbourhood
- Location within Iran
- Coordinates: 37°12′30″N 49°58′13″E
- Country: Iran
- Province: Gilan
- County: Lahijan
- Bakhsh: Central
- City: Lahijan

Population (2006)
  - Total: 1,673
- Time zone: UTC+3:30 (IRST)

Hajjiabad (Persian: حاجی آباد, also Romanized as Ḩājjīābād) is a neighborhood in the western part of Lahijan city, Gilan Province, Iran.

Formerly, it was a village in Baz Kia Gurab Rural District, in the Central District of Lahijan County. At the 2006 census, its population was 1,673, in 468 families.

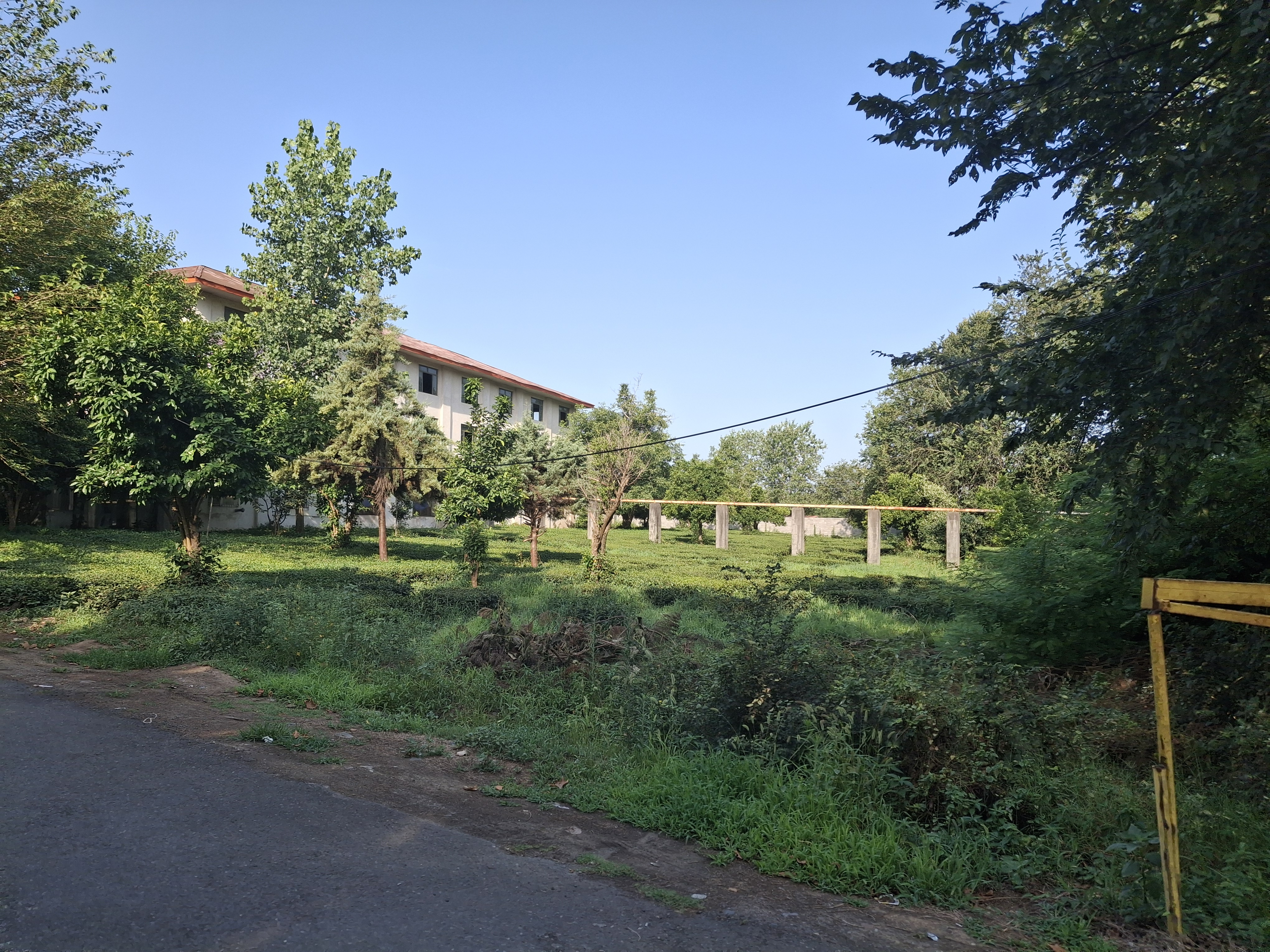
Tea factory in Lahijan, near Hajjiabad

Hajjiabad is near the city's western limits.
