= Hajjiabad, Sakhvid =

Hajjiabad حاجي اباد
- Village
- Location within Iran
- Coordinates: 31°39′36″N 53°54′36″E
- Country: Iran
- Province: Yazd
- County: Taft
- Bakhsh: Nir
- Rural District: Sakhvid

Population (2006)
  - Total: 66
- Time zone: UTC+3:30 (IRST)
  - Summer (DST): UTC+4:30 (IRDT)

Hajjiabad (Persian: حاجي اباد, also Romanized as Ḩājjīābād) is a village in Sakhvid Rural District, Nir District, Taft County, Yadz province, Iran. At the 2006 census, its population was 66, in 17 families.
