= Hajjiabad, Lordegan =

Hajjiabad حاجي اباد
- Village
- Location within Iran
- Coordinates: 31°25′43″N 50°47′35″E
- Country: Iran
- Province: Chaharmahal and Bakhtiari
- County: Lordegan
- Bakhsh: Central
- Rural District: Sardasht

Population (2006)
  - Total: 184
- Time zone: UTC+3:30 (IRST)
  - Summer (DST): UTC+4:30 (IRDT)

Hajjiabad (Persian: حاجي اباد, also Romanized as Ḩājjīābād) is a village in Sardasht Rural District, in the Central District of Lordegan County, Chaharmahal and Bakhtiari province, Iran. At the 2006 census, its population was 184, in 31 families.
