= Hajjiabad-e Do, Kermanshah =

Hajjiabad-e Do حاجي اباددو
- Village
- Location within Iran
- Coordinates: 34°21′57″N 48°10′43″E
- Country: Iran
- Province: Kermanshah
- County: Kangavar
- Bakhsh: Central
- Rural District: Gowdin

Population (2006)
  - Total: 63
- Time zone: UTC+3:30 (IRST)
  - Summer (DST): UTC+4:30 (IRDT)

Hajjiabad-e Do (Persian: حاجي اباددو, also Romanized as Ḩājjīābād-e Do; also known as Ḩājīābād) is a village in Gowdin Rural District, in the Central District of Kangavar County, Kermanshah Province, Iran. At the 2006 census, its population was 63, in 15 families.
