= Hajjiabad-e Shanrash =

Hajjiabad-e Shanrash حاجي ابادشانرش
- Village
- Location within Iran
- Coordinates: 34°36′24″N 46°29′01″E
- Country: Iran
- Province: Kermanshah
- County: Ravansar
- Bakhsh: Central
- Rural District: Dowlatabad

Population (2006)
  - Total: 146
- Time zone: UTC+3:30 (IRST)
  - Summer (DST): UTC+4:30 (IRDT)

Hajjiabad-e Shanrash (Persian: حاجي ابادشانرش, also Romanized as Ḩājjīābād-e Shānrash; also known as Ḩājjīābād) is a village in Dowlatabad Rural District, in the Central District of Ravansar County, Kermanshah Province, Iran. At the 2006 census, its population was 146, in 31 families.
