= Hajjiabad, Ahmadabad =

Hajjiabad حاجي اباد
- Village
- Location within Iran
- Coordinates: 36°00′15″N 59°21′50″E
- Country: Iran
- Province: Razavi Khorasan
- County: Mashhad
- Bakhsh: Ahmadabad
- Rural District: Piveh Zhan

Population (2006)
  - Total: 8
- Time zone: UTC+3:30 (IRST)
  - Summer (DST): UTC+4:30 (IRDT)

Hajjiabad (Persian: حاجي اباد, also Romanized as Ḩājjīābād; also known as Ḩājīābād) is a village in Piveh Zhan Rural District, Ahmadabad District, Mashhad County, Razavi Khorasan Province, Iran. At the 2006 census, its population was 8, in 4 families.
