= Hajjiabad-e Muzi =

Hajjiabad-e Muzi حاجي ابادموزي
- Village
- Location within Iran
- Coordinates: 29°45′52″N 51°35′02″E
- Country: Iran
- Province: Fars
- County: Kazerun
- Bakhsh: Central
- Rural District: Shapur

Population (2006)
  - Total: 436
- Time zone: UTC+3:30 (IRST)
  - Summer (DST): UTC+4:30 (IRDT)

Hajjiabad-e Muzi (Persian: حاجي ابادموزي, also Romanized as Ḩājjīābād-e Mūzī; also known as Ḩājjīābād) is a village in Shapur Rural District, in the Central District of Kazerun County, Fars province, Iran. At the 2006 census, its population was 436, in 102 families.
