= Central District (Kashmar County) =

District in Razavi Khorasan province, Iran

Central District (Kashmar County) Persian: بخش مرکزی شهرستان کاشمر
- District
- Location within Iran
- Coordinates: 35°11′N 58°33′E
- Country: Iran
- Province: Razavi Khorasan
- County: Kashmar
- Capital: Kashmar

Population (2016)
  - Total: 143,650
- Time zone: UTC+3:30 (IRST)

The Central District of Kashmar County (Persian: بخش مرکزی شهرستان کاشمر) is in Razavi Khorasan province, Iran. Its capital is the city of Kashmar.

== Demographics ==
=== Population ===
At the time of the 2006 National Census, the district's population was 119,507 in 32,143 households. The following census in 2011 counted 130,891 people in 38,726 households. The 2016 census measured the population of the district as 143,650 inhabitants in 44,774 households.

=== Administrative divisions ===
Central District (Kashmar County) Population
Administrative Divisions	2006	2011	2016
Bala Velayat RD	26,581	28,188	28,610
Pain Velayat RD	11,399	12,503	12,758
Kashmar (city)	81,527	90,200	102,282
Total	119,507	130,891	143,650
RD = Rural District
