= Ab Bad =

Ab Bad or Abbad (Persian: ابباد) may refer to:

- Abbad, Fars
- Ab Bad, Fars
- Ab Bad 2, Fars Province
- Ab Bad, Faryab, Kerman Province
- Ab Bad-e Chehel Tan
- Ab Bad-e Kaleb Ali Khani
- Ab Bad-e Pedari
- Ab Bad-e Qahremani
- Ab Bad-e Sivandi
