= Shahrak-e Emam Khomeyni =

Shahrak-e Emam Khomeyni or Shahrak Emam Khomeyni (Persian: شهرك امام خميني) may refer to:

- Shahrak-e Emam Khomeyni, Chaharmahal and Bakhtiari
- Shahrak-e Emam Khomeyni, Eqlid, Fars province
- Shahrak-e Emam Khomeyni, Mohr, Fars province
- Shahrak-e Emam Khomeyni, Qir and Karzin, Fars province
- Shahrak-e Emam Khomeyni, Hormozgan
- Shahrak Emam Khomeyni, Kerman
- Shahrak-e Emam Khomeyni, Khuzestan
- Shahrak-e Emam Khomeyni, Delfan, Lorestan province
- Shahrak Emam Khomeyni, Kuhdasht, Lorestan province
- Shahrak-e Emam Khomeyni, Mazandaran
- Shahrak-e Emam Khomeyni, Razavi Khorasan
- Shahrak-e Emam Khomeyni, South Khorasan
