= Galleh Dar (disambiguation) =

Galleh Dar is a city in Fars province, Iran.

Galleh Dar or Galeh Dar (Persian: گله دار) may also refer to:

- Galleh Dar, Bavanat, Fars province
- Galleh Dar District, in Fars province
- Galleh Dar Rural District, in Fars province
- Galleh Dar, Ilam, Ilam province
