= Band Bast =

Band Bast or Band-e Bast (Persian: بندبست) may refer to the following places in Iran:

- Band-e Bast, Fars
- Band Bast-e Pain, Fars Province
- Band Bast-e Bala, Fars Province
- Band Bast, Hormozgan
- Agi Band Bast, Hormozgan Province
