= Nowabad =

Nowabad (Persian: نو آباد) may refer to:

- Now Abad, Arghanj Khwa, Afghanistan
- Now Abad, Khwahan, Afghanistan
- Nowabad-e Ish, Afghanistan
- Nowabad, Chaharmahal and Bakhtiari, Iran
- Nowabad, Mohr, Fars Province, Iran
- Nowabad, Qir and Karzin, Fars Province, Iran
- Nowabad, Hamadan, Iran
- Nowabad, Khuzestan, Iran
- Nowabad, Amol, Mazandaran Province, Iran
- Nowabad, Dabuy-ye Jonubi, Amol County, Mazandaran Province, Iran
- Nowabad, Dasht-e Sar, Amol County, Mazandaran Province, Iran
- Nowabad, Savadkuh, Mazandaran Province, Iran
- Nowabad, Qazvin, Iran
- Nowabad, Razavi Khorasan, Iran
- Nowabad-e Espian, Iran
