= Qarah Hoseyni =

Qarah Hoseyni قره حسيني
- Village
- Country: Iran
- Province: Fars
- County: Qir and Karzin
- Bakhsh: Central
- Rural District: Mobarakabad

Population (2006)
  - Total: 58
- Time zone: UTC+3:30 (IRST)
  - Summer (DST): UTC+4:30 (IRDT)

Qarah Hoseyni (Persian: قره حسيني, also Romanized as Qarah Ḩoseynī) is a village in Mobarakabad Rural District, in the Central District of Qir and Karzin County, Fars province, Iran. At the 2006 census, its population was 58, in 10 families.
