= Khvosh Ab, Qir and Karzin =

Khvosh Ab خوشاب
- Village
- Location within Iran
- Coordinates: 28°24′23″N 53°00′54″E
- Country: Iran
- Province: Fars
- County: Qir and Karzin
- Bakhsh: Efzar
- Rural District: Efzar

Population (2006)
  - Total: 43
- Time zone: UTC+3:30 (IRST)
  - Summer (DST): UTC+4:30 (IRDT)

Khvosh Ab (Persian: خوشاب, also Romanized as Khvosh Āb) is a village in Efzar Rural District, Efzar District, Qir and Karzin County, Fars province, Iran. At the 2006 census, its population was 43, in 10 families.
