= Deh-e Bala, Mohr =

Deh-e Bala ده بالا
- Village
- Location within Iran
- Coordinates: 27°38′26″N 52°40′25″E
- Country: Iran
- Province: Fars
- County: Mohr
- Bakhsh: Galleh Dar
- Rural District: Galleh Dar

Population (2006)
  - Total: 343
- Time zone: UTC+3:30 (IRST)
  - Summer (DST): UTC+4:30 (IRDT)

Deh-e Bala (Persian: ده بالا, also Romanized as Deh-e Bālā; also known as Chāh Bālā) is a village in Galleh Dar Rural District, Galleh Dar District, Mohr County, Fars province, Iran. At the 2006 census, its population was 343, in 66 families.
