= Pir Gheyb, Fars =

Pir Gheyb پيرغيب
- Village
- Location within Iran
- Coordinates: 28°16′15″N 52°53′15″E
- Country: Iran
- Province: Fars
- County: Qir and Karzin
- Bakhsh: Efzar
- Rural District: Zakharuiyeh

Population (2006)
  - Total: 333
- Time zone: UTC+3:30 (IRST)
  - Summer (DST): UTC+4:30 (IRDT)

Pir Gheyb (Persian: پيرغيب, also Romanized as Pīr Gheyb) is a village in Zakharuiyeh Rural District, Efzar District, Qir and Karzin County, Fars province, Iran. At the 2006 census, its population was 333, in 69 families.
