= Tang-e Kish =

Tang-e Kish تنگ كيش
- Village
- Location within Iran
- Coordinates: 28°18′03″N 52°36′59″E
- Country: Iran
- Province: Fars
- County: Qir and Karzin
- Bakhsh: Central
- Rural District: Hangam

Population (2006)
  - Total: 518
- Time zone: UTC+3:30 (IRST)
  - Summer (DST): UTC+4:30 (IRDT)

Tang-e Kish (Persian: تنگ كيش, also Romanized as Tang-e Kīsh) is a village in Hangam Rural District, in the Central District of Qir and Karzin County, Fars province, Iran. At the 2006 census, its population was 518, in 110 families.
