= Tanguyeh-ye Sofla =

Tanguyeh-ye Sofla تنكويه سفلي
- Village
- Location within Iran
- Coordinates: 28°14′19″N 52°50′41″E
- Country: Iran
- Province: Fars
- County: Qir and Karzin
- Bakhsh: Efzar
- Rural District: Zakharuiyeh

Population (2006)
  - Total: 169
- Time zone: UTC+3:30 (IRST)
  - Summer (DST): UTC+4:30 (IRDT)

Tanguyeh-ye Sofla (Persian: تنگويه سفلي, also Romanized as Tangūyeh-ye Soflá; also known as Tankūīyeh-ye Soflá and Tangūyeh-ye Pāeen) is a village in Zakharuiyeh Rural District, Efzar District, Qir and Karzin County, Fars province, Iran. At the 2006 census, its population was 169, in 32 families.
