= Puzeh-ye Hezar Qadami =

Puzeh-ye Hezar Qadami پوزه هزارقدمي
- Village
- Location within Iran
- Coordinates: 28°23′30″N 53°14′15″E
- Country: Iran
- Province: Fars
- County: Qir and Karzin
- Bakhsh: Central
- Rural District: Mobarakabad

Population (2006)
  - Total: 217
- Time zone: UTC+3:30 (IRST)
  - Summer (DST): UTC+4:30 (IRDT)

Puzeh-ye Hezar Qadami (Persian: پوزه هزارقدمي, also Romanized as Pūzeh-ye Hezār Qadamī) is a village in Mobarakabad Rural District, in the Central District of Qir and Karzin County, Fars province, Iran. At the 2006 census, its population was 217, in 42 families.
