= Zeynabad-e Zakhru =

Zeynabad-e Zakhru زين ابادزاخرو
- Village
- Location within Iran
- Coordinates: 28°13′16″N 52°53′01″E
- Country: Iran
- Province: Fars
- County: Qir and Karzin
- Bakhsh: Efzar
- Rural District: Zakharuiyeh

Population (2006)
  - Total: 306
- Time zone: UTC+3:30 (IRST)
  - Summer (DST): UTC+4:30 (IRDT)

Zeynabad-e Zakhru (Persian: زين ابادزاخرو, also Romanized as Zeynābād-e Zākhrū; also known as Zeynābād) is a village in Zakharuiyeh Rural District, Efzar District, Qir and Karzin County, Fars province, Iran. At the 2006 census, its population was 306, in 69 families.
