= Chamkur =

Chamkur چم كور
- Village
- Location within Iran
- Coordinates: 28°13′42″N 52°53′40″E
- Country: Iran
- Province: Fars
- County: Qir and Karzin
- Bakhsh: Efzar
- Rural District: Zakharuiyeh

Population (2006)
  - Total: 295
- Time zone: UTC+3:30 (IRST)
  - Summer (DST): UTC+4:30 (IRDT)

Chamkur (Persian: چم كور, also Romanized as Chamkūr) is a village in Zakharuiyeh Rural District, Efzar District, Qir and Karzin County, Fars province, Iran. At the 2006 census, its population was 295, in 61 families.
