= Qalamdan =

Qalamdan قلمدان
- Village
- Location within Iran
- Coordinates: 28°16′53″N 52°50′33″E
- Country: Iran
- Province: Fars
- County: Qir and Karzin
- Bakhsh: Efzar
- Rural District: Zakharuiyeh

Population (2006)
  - Total: 51
- Time zone: UTC+3:30 (IRST)
  - Summer (DST): UTC+4:30 (IRDT)

Qalamdan (Persian: قلمدان, also Romanized as Qalamdān) is a village in Zakharuiyeh Rural District, Efzar District, Qir and Karzin County, Fars province, Iran. At the 2006 census, its population was 51, in 12 families.
