= Kord Sheykh =

Kord Sheykh كردشيخ
- Village
- Location within Iran
- Coordinates: 28°30′30″N 52°51′41″E
- Country: Iran
- Province: Fars
- County: Qir and Karzin
- Bakhsh: Central
- Rural District: Fathabad

Population (2006)
  - Total: 49
- Time zone: UTC+3:30 (IRST)
  - Summer (DST): UTC+4:30 (IRDT)

Kord Sheykh (Persian: كردشيخ, also Romanized as Kord-e Sheykh; also known as Khurdashīr) is a village in Fathabad Rural District, in the Central District of Qir and Karzin County, Fars province, Iran. At the 2006 census, its population was 49, in 12 families.
