= Chah Shurak =

Chah Shurak چاه شورك
- Village
- Location within Iran
- Coordinates: 27°42′37″N 52°42′20″E
- Country: Iran
- Province: Fars
- County: Mohr
- Bakhsh: Asir
- Rural District: Asir

Population (2006)
  - Total: 216
- Time zone: UTC+3:30 (IRST)
  - Summer (DST): UTC+4:30 (IRDT)

Chah Shurak (Persian: چاه شورك, also Romanized as Chāh Shūrak; also known as Chāh-e Sūrak) is a village in Asir Rural District, Asir District, Mohr County, Fars province, Iran. At the 2006 census, its population was 216, in 32 families.
