= Nachar-e Pain =

Nachar-e Pain ناچارپائين
- Village
- Location within Iran
- Coordinates: 27°43′55″N 52°32′17″E
- Country: Iran
- Province: Fars
- County: Mohr
- Bakhsh: Asir
- Rural District: Asir

Population (2006)
  - Total: 30
- Time zone: UTC+3:30 (IRST)
  - Summer (DST): UTC+4:30 (IRDT)

Nachar-e Pain (Persian: ناچارپائين, also Romanized as Nāchār-e Pā’īn; also known as Nāchār and Rangīnū) is a village in Asir Rural District, Asir District, Mohr County, Fars province, Iran. At the 2006 census, its population was 30, in 6 families.
