= Balkareh =

Balkareh بلكره
- Village
- Location within Iran
- Coordinates: 27°53′45″N 52°32′33″E
- Country: Iran
- Province: Fars
- County: Mohr
- Bakhsh: Asir
- Rural District: Dasht-e Laleh

Population (2006)
  - Total: 51
- Time zone: UTC+3:30 (IRST)
  - Summer (DST): UTC+4:30 (IRDT)

Balkareh (Persian: بلكره; also known as Balkare) is a village in Dasht-e Laleh Rural District, Asir District, Mohr County, Fars province, Iran. At the 2006 census, its population was 51, in 12 families.
