= Tang-e Koleh =

Tang-e Koleh تنگكله
- Village
- Location within Iran
- Coordinates: 28°22′21″N 52°56′07″E
- Country: Iran
- Province: Fars
- County: Qir and Karzin
- Bakhsh: Efzar
- Rural District: Efzar

Population (2006)
  - Total: 254
- Time zone: UTC+3:30 (IRST)
  - Summer (DST): UTC+4:30 (IRDT)

Tang-e Koleh (Persian: تنگكله, also Romanized as Tang-e Kalleh, Tang Kalah, and Tang Kalleh) is a village in Efzar Rural District, Efzar District, Qir and Karzin County, Fars province, Iran. At the 2006 census, its population was 254, in 61 families.
