= Berikhun =

Berikhun بريخون
- Village
- Location within Iran
- Coordinates: 28°23′35″N 53°12′50″E
- Country: Iran
- Province: Fars
- County: Qir and Karzin
- Bakhsh: Central
- Rural District: Mobarakabad

Population (2006)
  - Total: 307
- Time zone: UTC+3:30 (IRST)
  - Summer (DST): UTC+4:30 (IRDT)

Berikhun (Persian: بريخون, also Romanized as Berīkhūn and Bārīkhūn) is a village in Mobarakabad Rural District, in the Central District of Qir and Karzin County, Fars province, Iran. At the 2006 census, its population was 307, in 66 families.
