= Kowr Boland =

Kowr Boland كوربلند
- Village
- Location within Iran
- Coordinates: 27°57′04″N 52°28′09″E
- Country: Iran
- Province: Fars
- County: Mohr
- Bakhsh: Asir
- Rural District: Dasht-e Laleh

Population (2006)
  - Total: 246
- Time zone: UTC+3:30 (IRST)
  - Summer (DST): UTC+4:30 (IRDT)

Kowr Boland (Persian: كوربلند, also Romanized as Kowr-e Boland) is a village in Dasht-e Laleh Rural District, Asir District, Mohr County, Fars province, Iran. At the 2006 census, its population was 246, in 50 families.
