= Karun, Fars =

Village in Fars province, Iran

Karun Persian: كارون
- Village
- Location within Iran
- Coordinates: 27°41′04″N 52°37′57″E
- Country: Iran
- Province: Fars
- County: Mohr
- District: Galleh Dar
- Rural District: Galleh Dar

Population (2016)
  - Total: 1,109
- Time zone: UTC+3:30 (IRST)

Karun (Persian: كارون) (Note: Also romanized as Kārūn) is a village in Galleh Dar Rural District of Galleh Dar District, Mohr County, Fars province, Iran.

== Demographics ==
=== Population ===
At the time of the 2006 National Census, the village's population was 884 in 180 households, when it was Asir Rural District of Asir District. The following census in 2011 counted 968 people in 239 households, by which time the village had been transferred to Galleh Dar Rural District of Galleh Dar District. The 2016 census measured the population of the village as 1,109 people in 309 households. It was the most populous village in its rural district.
