= Chek Cheg =

Chek Cheg چك چگ
- Village
- Location within Iran
- Coordinates: 27°47′34″N 52°31′03″E
- Country: Iran
- Province: Fars
- County: Mohr
- Bakhsh: Asir
- Rural District: Dasht-e Laleh

Population (2006)
  - Total: 79
- Time zone: UTC+3:30 (IRST)
  - Summer (DST): UTC+4:30 (IRDT)

Chek Cheg (Persian: چك چگ) is a village in Dasht-e Laleh Rural District, Asir District, Mohr County, Fars province, Iran. At the 2006 census, its population was 79, in 13 families.
