= Hangam Cooperative =

Hangam Cooperative تعاوني عشايرهنگام
- Village
- Country: Iran
- Province: Fars
- County: Qir and Karzin
- Bakhsh: Central
- Rural District: Hangam

Population (2006)
  - Total: 63
- Time zone: UTC+3:30 (IRST)
  - Summer (DST): UTC+4:30 (IRDT)

Hangam Cooperative (Persian: تعاوني عشايرهنگام – T‘āvanī-ye 'Ashāyīr-e Hangām) is a village in Hangam Rural District, in the Central District of Qir and Karzin County, Fars province, Iran. At the 2006 census, its population was 63, in 10 families.
