= Jovinow =

Jovinow جوينو
- Village
- Location within Iran
- Coordinates: 27°56′10″N 52°27′55″E
- Country: Iran
- Province: Fars
- County: Mohr
- Bakhsh: Asir
- Rural District: Dasht-e Laleh

Population (2006)
  - Total: 105
- Time zone: UTC+3:30 (IRST)
  - Summer (DST): UTC+4:30 (IRDT)

Jovinow (Persian: جوينو, also Romanized as Jovīnow) is a village in Dasht-e Laleh Rural District, Asir District, Mohr County, Fars province, Iran. At the 2006 census, its population was 105, in 22 families.
