= Arusak =

Arusak عروسك
- Village
- Location within Iran
- Coordinates: 28°20′26″N 53°06′30″E
- Country: Iran
- Province: Fars
- County: Qir and Karzin
- Bakhsh: Efzar
- Rural District: Efzar

Population (2006)
  - Total: 223
- Time zone: UTC+3:30 (IRST)
  - Summer (DST): UTC+4:30 (IRDT)

Arusak (Persian: عروسك, also Romanized as 'Arūsak) is a village in Efzar Rural District, Efzar District, Qir and Karzin County, Fars province, Iran. At the 2006 census, its population was 223, in 46 families.
