= Eslamabad, Qir and Karzin =

Eslamabad اسلام اباد
- Village
- Location within Iran
- Coordinates: 28°20′45″N 53°03′49″E
- Country: Iran
- Province: Fars
- County: Qir and Karzin
- Bakhsh: Efzar
- Rural District: Efzar

Population (2006)
  - Total: 497
- Time zone: UTC+3:30 (IRST)
  - Summer (DST): UTC+4:30 (IRDT)

Eslamabad (Persian: اسلام اباد, also Romanized as Eslāmābād) is a village in Efzar Rural District, Efzar District, Qir and Karzin County, Fars province, Iran. At the 2006 census, its population was 497, in 98 families.
