= Nehuyeh =

Nehuyeh نهويه
- Village
- Location within Iran
- Coordinates: 28°20′47″N 53°10′25″E
- Country: Iran
- Province: Fars
- County: Qir and Karzin
- Bakhsh: Central
- Rural District: Mobarakabad

Population (2006)
  - Total: 471
- Time zone: UTC+3:30 (IRST)
  - Summer (DST): UTC+4:30 (IRDT)

Nehuyeh (Persian: نهويه, also Romanized as Nehūyeh; also known as Nūhūyeh and Tohūyeh) is a village in Mobarakabad Rural District, in the Central District of Qir and Karzin County, Fars province, Iran. At the 2006 census, its population was 471, in 111 families.
