= Ab Yad =

Ab Yad (Persian: ابياد) may refer to places in Iran:

- Ab Yad-e Badri
- Ab Yad-e Qahremani

== See also ==
- Ab Bad (disambiguation)
