= Dar ol Mizan =

DarolMizan دارالميزان
- A village with Arab ethnicity
- Location within Iran
- Coordinates: 27°56′30″N 52°29′03″E
- Country: Iran
- Province: Fars
- County: Mohr
- Bakhsh: Asir
- Rural District: Dasht-e Laleh

Population (2006)
  - Total: 652
- Time zone: UTC+3:30 (IRST)
  - Summer (DST): UTC+4:30 (IRDT)

Dar ol Mizan (Persian: دارالميزان, also Romanized as Dār ol Mīzān and Dārolmīzān) is a village with Arab people in Dasht-e Laleh Rural District, Asir District, Mohr County, Fars province, Iran. At the 2006 census, its population was 652, in 134 families.
