= Abu Askar =

Abu Askar ابوعسكر
- Village
- Location within Iran
- Coordinates: 28°25′04″N 52°38′11″E
- Country: Iran
- Province: Fars
- County: Qir and Karzin
- Bakhsh: Central
- Rural District: Hangam

Population (2006)
  - Total: 731
- Time zone: UTC+3:30 (IRST)
  - Summer (DST): UTC+4:30 (IRDT)

Abu Askar (Persian: ابوعسكر, also romanized as Abū 'Askar; also known as Abū 'Asgar) is a village in Hangam Rural District, in the Central District of Qir and Karzin County, Fars province, Iran. At the 2006 census, its population was 731, in 175 families.
