= Tayifeh Michak =

Tayifeh Michak طايفه ميچك
- Village
- Country: Iran
- Province: Fars
- County: Qir and Karzin
- Bakhsh: Central
- Rural District: Mobarakabad

Population (2006)
  - Total: 38
- Time zone: UTC+3:30 (IRST)
  - Summer (DST): UTC+4:30 (IRDT)

Tayifeh Michak (Persian: طايفه ميچك, also Romanized as Ţāyīfeh Mīchak) is a village in Mobarakabad Rural District, in the Central District of Qir and Karzin County, Fars province, Iran. At the 2006 census, its population was 38, in 6 families.
