= Samangan, Fars =

Samangan سمنگان
- Village
- Location within Iran
- Coordinates: 27°59′33″N 52°21′14″E
- Country: Iran
- Province: Fars
- County: Mohr
- Bakhsh: Asir
- Rural District: Dasht-e Laleh

Population (2006)
  - Total: 169
- Time zone: UTC+3:30 (IRST)
  - Summer (DST): UTC+4:30 (IRDT)

Samangan (Persian: سمنگان, also Romanized as Samangān; also known as Samangī) is a village in Dasht-e Laleh Rural District, Asir District, Mohr County, Fars province, Iran. At the 2006 census, its population was 169, in 35 families.
