= Tang-e Ruin =

Tang-e Ruin تنگرويين
- Village
- Location within Iran
- Coordinates: 28°20′19″N 53°14′53″E
- Country: Iran
- Province: Fars
- County: Qir and Karzin
- Bakhsh: Central
- Rural District: Mobarakabad

Population (2006)
  - Total: 826
- Time zone: UTC+3:30 (IRST)
  - Summer (DST): UTC+4:30 (IRDT)

Tang-e Ruin (Persian: تنگرويين, also Romanized as Tang-e Rū’īn; also known as Tang-e Rūdeh) is a village in Mobarakabad Rural District, in the Central District of Qir and Karzin County, Fars province, Iran. At the 2006 census, its population was 826, in 182 families.
