= Dimeh Sorkh =

Dimeh Sorkh ديمه سرخ
- Village
- Location within Iran
- Coordinates: 28°15′18″N 52°56′01″E
- Country: Iran
- Province: Fars
- County: Qir and Karzin
- Bakhsh: Efzar
- Rural District: Zakharuiyeh

Population (2006)
  - Total: 134
- Time zone: UTC+3:30 (IRST)
  - Summer (DST): UTC+4:30 (IRDT)

Dimeh Sorkh (Persian: ديمه سرخ, also Romanized as Dīmeh Sorkh) is a village in Zakharuiyeh Rural District, Efzar District, Qir and Karzin County, Fars province, Iran. At the 2006 census, its population was 134, in 24 families.
