= Karun (disambiguation) =

Karun (Persian: كارون) is a river in Iran.

Karun may also refer to:

== Places ==
- Karun, Fars
- Karun, Hormozgan
- Karun, Khuzestan
- Karun, Kohgiluyeh and Boyer-Ahmad
- Karun, Mazandaran
- Karun County, in Khuzestan Province
- Karun District, in Isfahan Province

== Other uses ==
- Karun, lead vocalist of Kenyan hip hop group Camp Mulla
- Karun Patel, a fictional character in the 2021 film Eternals
- Karun or Krun, the Mandaean lord of the underworld
