= Dasht-e Shur =

Dasht-e Shur دشتشور
- Village
- Location within Iran
- Coordinates: 28°20′46″N 53°03′48″E
- Country: Iran
- Province: Fars
- County: Qir and Karzin
- Bakhsh: Efzar
- Rural District: Efzar

Population (2006)
  - Total: 601
- Time zone: UTC+3:30 (IRST)
  - Summer (DST): UTC+4:30 (IRDT)

Dasht-e Shur (Persian: دشتشور, also Romanized as Dasht-e Shūr, Dasht-i-Shūr, and Dasht Shūr) is a village in Efzar Rural District, Efzar District, Qir and Karzin County, Fars province, Iran. At the 2006 census, its population was 601, in 118 families.
