= Tang-e Badi-ye Bala =

Tang-e Badi-ye Bala تنگ بادي بالا
- Village
- Location within Iran
- Coordinates: 28°26′34″N 52°39′09″E
- Country: Iran
- Province: Fars
- County: Qir and Karzin
- Bakhsh: Central
- Rural District: Hangam

Population (2006)
  - Total: 31
- Time zone: UTC+3:30 (IRST)
  - Summer (DST): UTC+4:30 (IRDT)

Tang-e Badi-ye Bala (Persian: تنگ بادي بالا, also Romanized as Tang-e Bādī-ye Bālā; also known as Tang-e Bādī) is a village in Hangam Rural District, in the Central District of Qir and Karzin County, Fars province, Iran. At the 2006 census, its population was 31, in 5 families.
