= Barkeh Abi =

Barkeh Abi بركه ابي
- Village
- Country: Iran
- Province: Fars
- County: Mohr
- Bakhsh: Asir
- Rural District: Dasht-e Laleh

Population (2006)
  - Total: 66
- Time zone: UTC+3:30 (IRST)
  - Summer (DST): UTC+4:30 (IRDT)

Barkeh Abi (Persian: بركه ابي, also Romanized as Barkeh Ābī) is a village in Dasht-e Laleh Rural District, Asir District, Mohr County, Fars province, Iran. At the 2006 census, its population was 66, in 13 families.
