= Mezijan =

Mezijan مزيجان
- Village
- Location within Iran
- Coordinates: 27°41′15″N 52°44′46″E
- Country: Iran
- Province: Fars
- County: Mohr
- Bakhsh: Asir
- Rural District: Asir

Population (2006)
  - Total: 913
- Time zone: UTC+3:30 (IRST)
  - Summer (DST): UTC+4:30 (IRDT)

Mezijan (Persian: مزيجان, also Romanized as Mezījān and Mazeyjān; also known as Māzū and Mazū) is a village in Asir Rural District, Asir District, Mohr County, Fars province, Iran. At the 2006 census, its population was 913, in 175 families.
