= Deh Beh =

Deh Beh ده به
- Village
- Location within Iran
- Coordinates: 28°27′04″N 53°07′28″E
- Country: Iran
- Province: Fars
- County: Qir and Karzin
- Bakhsh: Central
- Rural District: Fathabad

Population (2006)
  - Total: 1,852
- Time zone: UTC+3:30 (IRST)
  - Summer (DST): UTC+4:30 (IRDT)

Deh Beh (Persian: ده به) is a village in Fathabad Rural District, in the Central District of Qir and Karzin County, Fars province, Iran. At the 2024 census, its population was 1, 852 in 314 families.
