= Shahrak-e Emam =

Shahrak-e Emam (Persian: شهرك امام) may refer to:

- Shahrak-e Emam, Mohr, Fars Province
- Shahrak-e Emam, Neyriz, Fars Province
- Shahrak-e Emam, Qir and Karzin, Fars Province
- Shahrak-e Emam, Ilam
- Shahrak-e Emam, Khuzestan
- Shahrak-e Emam, Lorestan
- Shahrak-e Emam, Razavi Khorasan

== See also ==
- Shahrak-e Emam Khomeyni (disambiguation)
