= Qadaman =

Qadaman قدمان
- Village
- Location within Iran
- Coordinates: 27°43′34″N 52°39′11″E
- Country: Iran
- Province: Fars
- County: Mohr
- Bakhsh: Asir
- Rural District: Asir

Population (2006)
  - Total: 232
- Time zone: UTC+3:30 (IRST)
  - Summer (DST): UTC+4:30 (IRDT)

Qadaman (Persian: قدمان, also Romanized as Qadamān; also known as Chāh-e Qadamān and Chāh Qadamān) is a village in Asir Rural District, Asir District, Mohr County, Fars province, Iran. At the 2006 census, its population was 232, in 53 families.
