= Ab Garm, Qir and Karzin =

Ab Garm ابگرم
- Village
- Location within Iran
- Coordinates: 28°18′26″N 53°03′02″E
- Country: Iran
- Province: Fars
- County: Qir and Karzin
- Bakhsh: Efzar
- Rural District: Efzar

Population (2006)
  - Total: 544
- Time zone: UTC+3:30 (IRST)
  - Summer (DST): UTC+4:30 (IRDT)

Ab Garm (Persian: ابگرم, also Romanized as Āb Garm and Āb-i-Garm) is a village in Efzar Rural District, Efzar District, Qir and Karzin County, Fars province, Iran. At the 2006 census, its population was 544, in 111 families.
