= Jigardan =

Jigardan جيگردان
- Village
- Location within Iran
- Coordinates: 28°17′54″N 52°46′43″E
- Country: Iran
- Province: Fars
- County: Qir and Karzin
- Bakhsh: Efzar
- Rural District: Zakharuiyeh

Population (2006)
  - Total: 102
- Time zone: UTC+3:30 (IRST)
  - Summer (DST): UTC+4:30 (IRDT)

Jigardan (Persian: جيگردان, also Romanized as Jīgardān; also known as Jegardān) is a village in Zakharuiyeh Rural District, Efzar District, Qir and Karzin County, Fars province, Iran. At the 2006 census, its population was 102, in 21 families.
