= Behrestan =

Behrestan بهرستان
- Village
- Location within Iran
- Coordinates: 27°42′06″N 52°43′42″E
- Country: Iran
- Province: Fars
- County: Mohr
- Bakhsh: Asir
- Rural District: Asir

Population (2006)
  - Total: 493
- Time zone: UTC+3:30 (IRST)
  - Summer (DST): UTC+4:30 (IRDT)

Behrestan (Persian: بهرستان, also Romanized as Behrestān and Baharestan; also known as Bahristān and Behristān) is a village in Asir Rural District, Asir District, Mohr County, Fars province, Iran. At the 2006 census, its population was 493, in 93 families.
