= Charchareh =

Charchareh چرچره
- Village
- Country: Iran
- Province: Fars
- County: Qir and Karzin
- Bakhsh: Central
- Rural District: Hangam

Population (2006)
  - Total: 14
- Time zone: UTC+3:30 (IRST)
  - Summer (DST): UTC+4:30 (IRDT)

Charchareh (Persian: چرچره) is a village in Hangam Rural District, in the Central District of Qir and Karzin County, Fars province, Iran. At the 2006 census, its population was 14, in 4 families.
