= Karimabad, Mohr =

Karimabad كريم اباد
- Village
- Location within Iran
- Coordinates: 27°45′20″N 52°36′47″E
- Country: Iran
- Province: Fars
- County: Mohr
- Bakhsh: Asir
- Rural District: Dasht-e Laleh

Population (2006)
  - Total: 85
- Time zone: UTC+3:30 (IRST)
  - Summer (DST): UTC+4:30 (IRDT)

Karimabad (Persian: كريم اباد, also Romanized as Karīmābād) is a village in Dasht-e Laleh Rural District, Asir District, Mohr County, Fars province, Iran. At the 2006 census, its population was 85, in 15 families.
