= Tashuyeh =

Tashuyeh تشويه
- Village
- Location within Iran
- Coordinates: 28°25′20″N 52°51′07″E
- Country: Iran
- Province: Fars
- County: Qir and Karzin
- Bakhsh: Efzar
- Rural District: Efzar

Population (2006)
  - Total: 26
- Time zone: UTC+3:30 (IRST)
  - Summer (DST): UTC+4:30 (IRDT)

Tashuyeh (Persian: تشويه, also Romanized as Tashūyeh) is a village in Efzar Rural District, Efzar District, Qir and Karzin County, Fars province, Iran. At the 2006 census, its population was 26, in 6 families.
