= Cheshmeh-ye Abgarm =

Cheshmeh-ye Abgarm چشمه ابگرم
- Village
- Location within Iran
- Coordinates: 28°21′19″N 53°25′49″E
- Country: Iran
- Province: Fars
- County: Qir and Karzin
- Bakhsh: Central
- Rural District: Mobarakabad

Population (2006)
  - Total: 16
- Time zone: UTC+3:30 (IRST)
  - Summer (DST): UTC+4:30 (IRDT)

Cheshmeh-ye Abgarm (Persian: چشمه ابگرم, also romanized as Cheshmeh-ye Ābgarm) is a village in Mobarakabad Rural District, in the Central District of Qir and Karzin County, Fars province, Iran. At the 2006 census, its population was 16, in 4 families.
