= Puzeh-ye Chaharabi =

Puzeh-ye Chaharabi پوزه چهارابي
- Village
- Country: Iran
- Province: Fars
- County: Qir and Karzin
- Bakhsh: Central
- Rural District: Mobarakabad

Population (2006)
  - Total: 22
- Time zone: UTC+3:30 (IRST)
  - Summer (DST): UTC+4:30 (IRDT)

Puzeh-ye Chaharabi (Persian: پوزه چهارابي, also Romanized as Pūzeh-ye Chahārābī) is a village in Mobarakabad Rural District, in the Central District of Qir and Karzin County, Fars province, Iran. At the 2006 census, its population was 22, in 5 families.
