= Zakharu-e Bala =

Zakharu-e Bala زاخروبالا
- Village
- Location within Iran
- Coordinates: 28°18′24″N 52°51′28″E
- Country: Iran
- Province: Fars
- County: Qir and Karzin
- Bakhsh: Efzar
- Rural District: Zakharuiyeh

Population (2006)
  - Total: 226
- Time zone: UTC+3:30 (IRST)
  - Summer (DST): UTC+4:30 (IRDT)

Zakharu-e Bala (Persian: زاخروبالا, also Romanized as Zākhrū-e Bālā; also known as Zākhrūyeh and Zākhrūyeh-ye 'Olyā) is a village in Zakharuiyeh Rural District, Efzar District, Qir and Karzin County, Fars province, Iran. At the 2006 census, its population was 226, in 50 families.
