= Sar Chah =

Sar Chah or Sar-e Chah or Sar-i-Chah or Sarchah (Persian: سر چاه) may refer to:

- Sar Chah, Chaharmahal and Bakhtiari
- Sarchah, Qir and Karzin, Fars Province
- Sar Chah-e Duruznab, Khuzestan Province
- Sar Chah-e Khoshab, Khuzestan Province
- Sar Chah, Razavi Khorasan
- Sar Chah-e Ammari, South Khorasan Province
- Sar Chah-e Shur, South Khorasan Province
- Sar Chah-e Tazian, South Khorasan Province
