= Arudan-e Sofla =

Arudan-e Sofla ارودان سفلي
- Village
- Location within Iran
- Coordinates: 27°43′33″N 52°39′10″E
- Country: Iran
- Province: Fars
- County: Mohr
- Bakhsh: Asir
- Rural District: Asir

Population (2006)
  - Total: 108
- Time zone: UTC+3:30 (IRST)
  - Summer (DST): UTC+4:30 (IRDT)

Arudan-e Sofla (Persian: ارودان سفلي, also Romanized as Ārūdān-e Soflá; also known as Ārūdān) is a village in Asir Rural District, Asir District, Mohr County, Fars province, Iran. At the 2006 census, its population was 108, in 26 families.
