= Shardeh =

Shardeh شارده
- Village
- Location within Iran
- Coordinates: 28°16′47″N 52°51′49″E
- Country: Iran
- Province: Fars
- County: Qir and Karzin
- Bakhsh: Efzar
- Rural District: Zakharuiyeh

Population (2006)
  - Total: 260
- Time zone: UTC+3:30 (IRST)
  - Summer (DST): UTC+4:30 (IRDT)

Shardeh (Persian: شارده, also Romanized as Shārdeh) is a village in Zakharuiyeh Rural District, Efzar District, Qir and Karzin County, Fars province, Iran. At the 2006 census, its population was 260, in 48 families.
