= Asir (disambiguation) =

Asir is a province of Saudi Arabia.

Asir may also refer to:

== Iran ==
- Asir-e Esfahani, poet
- Asir, Iran
- Asir District
- Asir Rural District

== Saudi Arabia ==
- Asir Mountains
- Asir National Park

== States ==
- Idrisid Emirate of Asir
- Sheikdom of Upper Asir

== See also ==
- Æsir, the gods of Norse mythology
- Asiri (disambiguation)
