= Mayyu =

Mayyu میو
- Village
- Location within Iran
- Coordinates: 27°55′20″N 52°30′59″E
- Country: Iran
- Province: Fars
- County: Mohr
- Bakhsh: Asir
- Rural District: Dasht-e Laleh

Population (2006)
  - Total: 96
- Time zone: UTC+3:30 (IRST)
  - Summer (DST): UTC+4:30 (IRDT)

Mayyu (Persian: میو, also Romanized as Mayyū; also known as Mīhū) is a village in Dasht-e Laleh Rural District, Asir District, Mohr County, Fars province, Iran. At the 2006 census, its population was 96, in 18 families.
