= Tol-e Semengi =

Tol-e Semengi تل سمنگي
- Village
- Location within Iran
- Coordinates: 28°25′33″N 52°39′17″E
- Country: Iran
- Province: Fars
- County: Qir and Karzin
- Bakhsh: Central
- Rural District: Hangam

Population (2006)
  - Total: 23
- Time zone: UTC+3:30 (IRST)
  - Summer (DST): UTC+4:30 (IRDT)

Tol-e Semengi (Persian: تل سمنگي, also Romanized as Tol-e Semengī; also known as Tal-e Sīmīng) is a village in Hangam Rural District, in the Central District of Qir and Karzin County, Fars province, Iran. At the 2006 census, its population was 23, in 6 families.
