= Khvajeh Morad =

Khvajeh Morad خواجه مراد
- Village
- Location within Iran
- Coordinates: 27°37′17″N 52°43′09″E
- Country: Iran
- Province: Fars
- County: Mohr
- Bakhsh: Galleh Dar
- Rural District: Fal

Population (2006)
  - Total: 530
- Time zone: UTC+3:30 (IRST)
  - Summer (DST): UTC+4:30 (IRDT)

Khvajeh Morad (Persian: خواجه مراد, also Romanized as Khvājeh Morād; also known as Chāh-e Khvājeh Morād and Khvājeh Murād) is a village in Fal Rural District, Galleh Dar District, Mohr County, Fars province, Iran. At the 2006 census, its population was 530, in 96 families.
