= Pakal, Fars =

Pakal پاكل
- Village
- Location within Iran
- Coordinates: 27°58′42″N 52°24′55″E
- Country: Iran
- Province: Fars
- County: Mohr
- Bakhsh: Asir
- Rural District: Dasht-e Laleh

Population (2006)
  - Total: 44
- Time zone: UTC+3:30 (IRST)
  - Summer (DST): UTC+4:30 (IRDT)

Pakal (Persian: پاكل, also Romanized as Pākal) is a village in Dasht-e Laleh Rural District, Asir District, Mohr County, Fars province, Iran. At the 2006 census, its population was 44, in 10 families.
