= Nargesi, Fars =

Nargesi نرگسي
- Village
- Location within Iran
- Coordinates: 27°44′20″N 52°30′36″E
- Country: Iran
- Province: Fars
- County: Mohr
- Bakhsh: Asir
- Rural District: Dasht-e Laleh

Population (2006)
  - Total: 54
- Time zone: UTC+3:30 (IRST)
  - Summer (DST): UTC+4:30 (IRDT)

Nargesi (Persian: نرگسي, also Romanized as Nargesī) is a village in Dasht-e Laleh Rural District, Asir District, Mohr County, Fars province, Iran. At the 2006 census, its population was 54, in 7 families.
