= Shah Mohit =

Shah Mohit شاه محيط
- Village
- Location within Iran
- Coordinates: 28°34′31″N 53°00′44″E
- Country: Iran
- Province: Fars
- County: Qir and Karzin
- Bakhsh: Central
- Rural District: Fathabad

Population (2006)
  - Total: 20
- Time zone: UTC+3:30 (IRST)
  - Summer (DST): UTC+4:30 (IRDT)

Shah Mohit (Persian: شاه محيط, also Romanized as Shāh Moḩīţ) is a village in Fathabad Rural District, in the Central District of Qir and Karzin County, Fars province, Iran. At the 2006 census, its population was 20, in 4 families.
