= Nimdeh =

Nimdeh نيمده
- Village
- Location within Iran
- Coordinates: 28°19′30″N 53°05′23″E
- Country: Iran
- Province: Fars
- County: Qir and Karzin
- Bakhsh: Efzar
- Rural District: Efzar

Population (2006)
  - Total: 109
- Time zone: UTC+3:30 (IRST)
  - Summer (DST): UTC+4:30 (IRDT)

Nimdeh (Persian: نيمده, also Romanized as Nīmdeh) is a village in Efzar Rural District, Efzar District, Qir and Karzin County, Fars province, Iran. At the 2006 census, its population was 109, in 26 families.
