= Baghchaleh =

Baghchaleh باغ چاله
- Village
- Location within Iran
- Coordinates: 27°43′14″N 52°41′23″E
- Country: Iran
- Province: Fars
- County: Mohr
- Bakhsh: Asir
- Rural District: Asir

Population (2006)
  - Total: 278
- Time zone: UTC+3:30 (IRST)
  - Summer (DST): UTC+4:30 (IRDT)

Baghchaleh (Persian: باغ چاله, also Romanized as Bāghchāleh) is a village in Asir Rural District, Asir District, Mohr County, Fars province, Iran. At the 2006 census, its population was 278, in 54 families.
