= Nakhelstan-e Galleh Dar =

Nakhelstan-e Galleh Dar نخلستان گله دار
- Village
- Country: Iran
- Province: Fars
- County: Mohr
- Bakhsh: Galleh Dar
- Rural District: Fal

Population (2006)
  - Total: 33
- Time zone: UTC+3:30 (IRST)
  - Summer (DST): UTC+4:30 (IRDT)

Nakhelstan-e Galleh Dar (Persian: نخلستان گله دار, also Romanized as Nakhlestān-e Galleh Dār) is a village in Fal Rural District, Galleh Dar District, Mohr County, Fars province, Iran. At the 2006 census, its population was 33, in 9 families.
