= Tanguyeh-ye Olya =

Tanguyeh-ye Olya تنگويه عليا
- Village
- Location within Iran
- Coordinates: 28°15′30″N 52°52′53″E
- Country: Iran
- Province: Fars
- County: Qir and Karzin
- Bakhsh: Efzar
- Rural District: Zakharuiyeh

Population (2006)
  - Total: 454
- Time zone: UTC+3:30 (IRST)
  - Summer (DST): UTC+4:30 (IRDT)

Tanguyeh-ye Olya (Persian: تنگويه عليا, also Romanized as Tangūyeh-ye 'Olyā; also known as Tangūyeh-ye Bālā) is a village in Zakharuiyeh Rural District, Efzar District, Qir and Karzin County, Fars province, Iran. At the 2006 census, its population was 454, in 96 families.
