= Dasht-e Lar =

Dasht-e Lar دشت لار
- Village
- Location within Iran
- Coordinates: 28°22′14″N 52°46′29″E
- Country: Iran
- Province: Fars
- County: Qir and Karzin
- Bakhsh: Central
- Rural District: Hangam

Population (2006)
  - Total: 97
- Time zone: UTC+3:30 (IRST)
  - Summer (DST): UTC+4:30 (IRDT)

Dasht-e Lar (Persian: دشت لار, also Romanized as Dasht-e Lār) is a village in Hangam Rural District, in the Central District of Qir and Karzin County, Fars province, Iran. At the 2006 census, its population was 97, in 17 families.
