= Gurizeneh =

Gurizeneh گوريزنه
- Village
- Country: Iran
- Province: Fars
- County: Jahrom
- Bakhsh: Kordian
- Rural District: Alaviyeh

Population (2006)
  - Total: 19
- Time zone: UTC+3:30 (IRST)
  - Summer (DST): UTC+4:30 (IRDT)

Gurizeneh (Persian: گوريزنه, also Romanized as Gūrīzeneh) is a village in Alaviyeh Rural District, Kordian District, Jahrom County, Fars province, Iran. At the 2006 census, its population was 19, in 4 families.
