= Khan Nahr =

Khan Nahr خان نهر
- Village
- Location within Iran
- Coordinates: 28°47′24″N 53°30′00″E
- Country: Iran
- Province: Fars
- County: Jahrom
- Bakhsh: Kordian
- Rural District: Qotbabad

Population (2006)
  - Total: 31
- Time zone: UTC+3:30 (IRST)
  - Summer (DST): UTC+4:30 (IRDT)

Khan Nahr (Persian: خان نهر, also Romanized as Khān Nahr; also known as Khān Nar) is a village in Qotbabad Rural District, Kordian District, Jahrom County, Fars province, Iran. At the 2006 census, its population was 31, in 7 families.
