= Hajjiabad, Galleh Dar =

Village in Fars province, Iran

Hajjiabad Persian: حاجي اباد
- Village
- Location within Iran
- Coordinates: 27°36′45″N 52°42′58″E
- Country: Iran
- Province: Fars
- County: Mohr
- District: Galleh Dar
- Rural District: Fal

Population (2016)
  - Total: 1,200
- Time zone: UTC+3:30 (IRST)

Hajjiabad (Persian: حاجي اباد) (Note: Also romanized as Ḩājjīābād) is a village in, and the capital of, Fal Rural District of Galleh Dar District, Mohr County, Fars province, Iran. The previous capital of the rural district was the village of Fal, now a city.

== Demographics ==
=== Population ===
At the time of the 2006 National Census, the village's population was 590 in 120 households. The following census in 2011 counted 1,140 people in 262 households. The 2016 census measured the population of the village as 1,200 people in 322 households.
