= Bisheh Zard, Qir and Karzin =

Bisheh Zard بيشه زرد
- Village
- Location within Iran
- Coordinates: 28°04′54″N 52°54′22″E
- Country: Iran
- Province: Fars
- County: Qir and Karzin
- Bakhsh: Central
- Rural District: Hangam

Population (2006)
  - Total: 22
- Time zone: UTC+3:30 (IRST)
  - Summer (DST): UTC+4:30 (IRDT)

Bisheh Zard (Persian: بيشه زرد, also Romanized as Bīsheh Zard) is a village in Hangam Rural District, in the Central District of Qir and Karzin County, Fars province, Iran. At the 2006 census, its population was 22, in 5 families.
