= Band Bast-e Pain =

Band Bast-e Pain بندبست پايين
- Village
- Location within Iran
- Coordinates: 28°17′24″N 53°14′19″E
- Country: Iran
- Province: Fars
- County: Qir and Karzin
- Bakhsh: Central
- Rural District: Mobarakabad

Population (2006)
  - Total: 562
- Time zone: UTC+3:30 (IRST)
  - Summer (DST): UTC+4:30 (IRDT)

Band Bast-e Pain (Persian: بندبست پايين, also Romanized as Band Bast-e Pā’īn; also known as Band Bast) is a village in Mobarakabad Rural District, in the Central District of Qir and Karzin County, Fars province, Iran. At the 2006 census, its population was 562, in 132 families.
