= Pain Kuh, Fars =

Pain Kuh پائين كوه
- Village
- Location within Iran
- Coordinates: 27°43′31″N 52°40′20″E
- Country: Iran
- Province: Fars
- County: Mohr
- Bakhsh: Asir
- Rural District: Asir

Population (2006)
  - Total: 133
- Time zone: UTC+3:30 (IRST)
  - Summer (DST): UTC+4:30 (IRDT)

Pain Kuh (Persian: پائين كوه, also Romanized as Pā’īn Kūh; also known as Pāeenkūh) is a village in Asir Rural District, Mohr County, Fars province, Iran. At the 2006 census, its population was 133, in 31 families.
