= Shahrak-e Qalat =

Village in Fars province, Iran

Shahrak-e Qalat Persian: شهرك قلات
- Village
- Location within Iran
- Coordinates: 28°22′08″N 53°09′18″E
- Country: Iran
- Province: Fars
- County: Qir and Karzin
- District: Central
- Rural District: Mobarakabad

Population (2016)
  - Total: 1,032
- Time zone: UTC+3:30 (IRST)

Shahrak-e Qalat (Persian: شهرك قلات) (Note: Also romanized as Shahrak-e Qalāt; also known as Qalāt and Qelāt) is a village in Mobarakabad Rural District of the Central District of Qir and Karzin County, Fars province, Iran.

== Demographics ==
=== Population ===
At the time of the 2006 National Census, the village's population was 858 in 193 households. The following census in 2011 counted 967 people in 256 households. The 2016 census measured the population of the village as 1,032 people in 280 households. It is the most populous village in its rural district.
