= Mazraeh-ye Pahn =

Village in Fars province, Iran

Mazraeh-ye Pahn Persian: مزرعه پهن
- Village
- Location within Iran
- Coordinates: 28°14′01″N 52°53′36″E
- Country: Iran
- Province: Fars
- County: Qir and Karzin
- District: Efzar
- Rural District: Zakharuiyeh

Population (2016)
  - Total: 668
- Time zone: UTC+3:30 (IRST)

Mazraeh-ye Pahn (Persian: مزرعه پهن) is a village in, and the capital of, Zakharuiyeh Rural District of Efzar District, Qir and Karzin County, Fars province, Iran.

== Demographics ==
=== Population ===
At the time of the 2006 National Census, the village's population was 588 in 133 households. The following census in 2011 counted 685 people in 175 households. The 2016 census measured the population of the village as 668 people in 205 households. It was the most populous village in its rural district.
