= Shahrak-e Aliabad, Fars =

Village in Fars province, Iran

Shahrak-e Aliabad Persian: شهرك علي اباد
- Village
- Location within Iran
- Coordinates: 28°25′26″N 53°11′21″E
- Country: Iran
- Province: Fars
- County: Qir and Karzin
- District: Central
- Rural District: Fathabad

Population (2016)
  - Total: 2,468
- Time zone: UTC+3:30 (IRST)

Shahrak-e Aliabad (Persian: شهرك علي اباد) (Note: Also romanized as Shahrak-e ‘Alīābād; also known as ‘Alīābād and ‘Ālīābād) is a village in Fathabad Rural District of the Central District of Qir and Karzin County, Fars province, Iran.

== Demographics ==
=== Population ===
At the time of the 2006 National Census, the village's population was 2,202 in 496 households. The following census in 2011 counted 2,281 people in 591 households. The 2016 census measured the population of the village as 2,468 people in 709 households. It was the most populous village in its rural district.
