= Ab Bada =

Ab Bada اب بادا
- Village
- Location within Iran
- Coordinates: 28°22′01″N 53°13′34″E
- Country: Iran
- Province: Fars
- County: Qir and Karzin
- Bakhsh: Central
- Rural District: Mobarakabad

Population (2006)
  - Total: 86
- Time zone: UTC+3:30 (IRST)
  - Summer (DST): UTC+4:30 (IRDT)

Ab Bada (Persian: اب بادا, also Romanized as Āb Bādā; also known as Āb Bād and Āb Bād-e Do) is a village in Mobarakabad Rural District, in the Central District of Qir and Karzin County, Fars province, Iran. At the 2006 census, its population was 86, in 22 families.
