= Ab Bidak =

Ab Bidak (Persian: اب بيدك) may refer to:

- Ab Bidak, Chaharmahal and Bakhtiari
- Ab Bidak, Kohgiluyeh and Boyer-Ahmad
- Ab Bidak, Fars
