= Nowabad, Qir and Karzin =

Nowabad نواباد
- Village
- Location within Iran
- Coordinates: 28°23′40″N 52°37′38″E
- Country: Iran
- Province: Fars
- County: Qir and Karzin
- Bakhsh: Central
- Rural District: Hangam

Population (2006)
  - Total: 275
- Time zone: UTC+3:30 (IRST)
  - Summer (DST): UTC+4:30 (IRDT)

Nowabad (Persian: نواباد, also Romanized as Nowābād) is a village in Hangam Rural District, in the Central District of Qir and Karzin County, Fars province, Iran. At the 2006 census its population was 275 with 62 families.
