= Heraj =

Heraj هرج
- Village
- Location within Iran
- Coordinates: 27°43′12″N 52°40′56″E
- Country: Iran
- Province: Fars
- County: Mohr
- Bakhsh: Asir
- Rural District: Asir

Population (2006)
  - Total: 725
- Time zone: UTC+3:30 (IRST)
  - Summer (DST): UTC+4:30 (IRDT)

Heraj (Persian: هرج, also Romanized as Haraj and Harj) is a village in Asir Rural District, Asir District, Mohr County, Fars province, Iran. At the 2006 census, its population was 725, in 156 families.
