= Jahrom Power Plant =

Power station in Qotbabad, Kordian, Jahrom, Fars, Iran

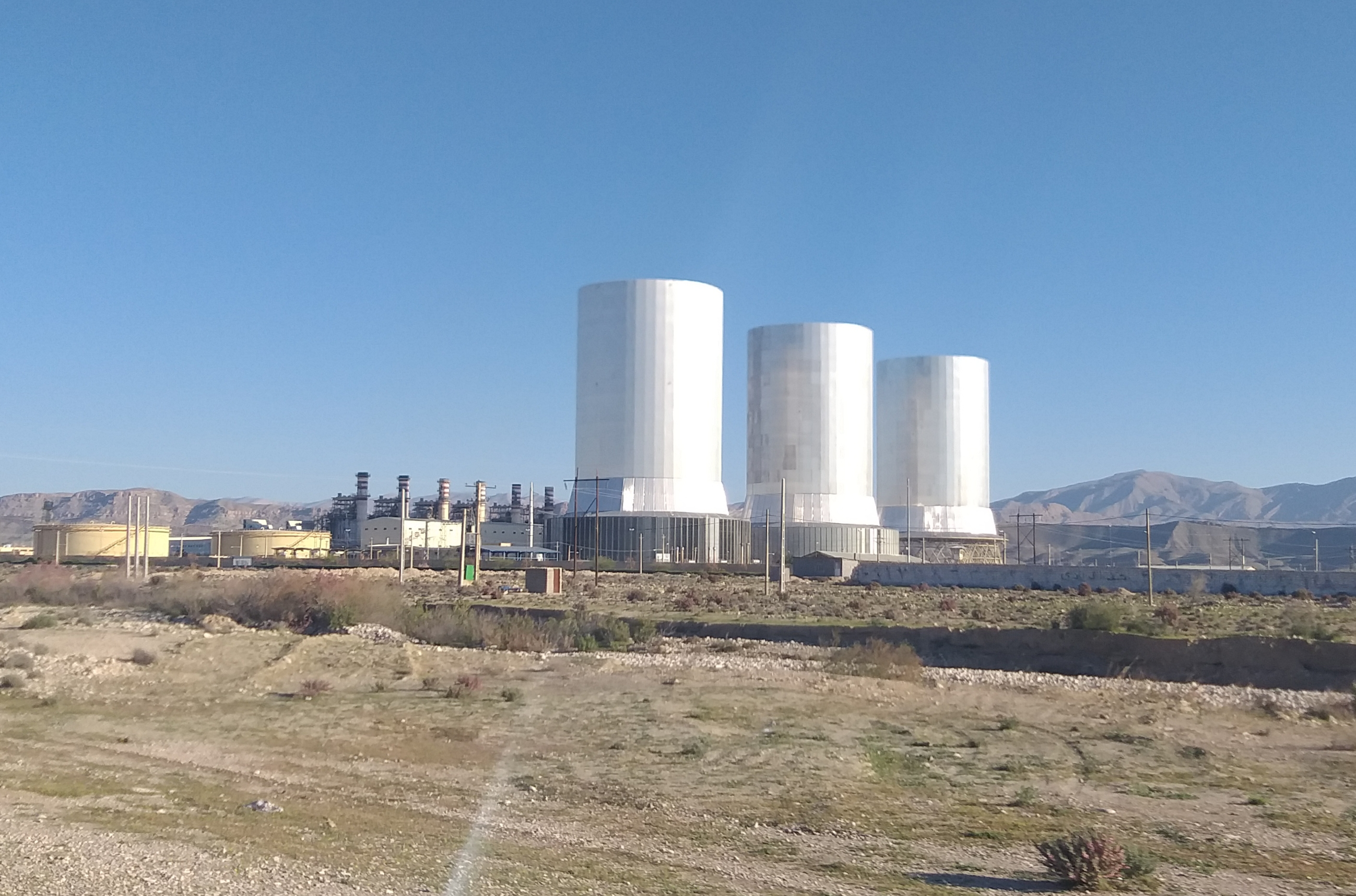
- Official name: نیروگاه سیکل ترکیبی جهرم
- Country: Iran
- Location: Qotbabad, Kordian, Jahrom, Fars
- Coordinates: 28°42′3″N 53°32′41″E
- Status: Operational
- Construction began: 2006
- Commission date: July 2007
- Owner: Jahrom Power Generation
- Combined cycle?: Yes

Power generation
- Nameplate capacity: 1,434 MW

External links
- Website: www.jpgc.ir
- Commons: Related media on Commons

The Jahrom Power Plant (Persian: نیروگاه سیکل ترکیبی جهرم) is a power station in Qotbabad Rural District, Kordian District, Jahrom County, Fars province, Iran.

== History ==
The construction of the power station began in 2006. It was commissioned in July 2007.

== Technical specifications ==
The power station is owned by Jahrom Power Generation. It has an installed generation capacity of 1,434 MW.

== See also ==
- List of power stations in Iran
