= Chahar Qashi =

Chahar Qashi چهارقاشي
- village
- Location within Iran
- Coordinates: 29°03′35″N 54°07′57″E
- Country: Iran
- Province: Fars
- County: Jahrom
- Bakhsh: Kordian
- Rural District: Alaviyeh

Population (2006)
  - Total: 189
- Time zone: UTC+3:30 (IRST)
  - Summer (DST): UTC+4:30 (IRDT)

Chahar Qashi (Persian: چهارقاشي, also Romanized as Chahār Qāshī; also known as Chahār Qāshā) is a village in Alaviyeh Rural District, Kordian District, Jahrom County, Fars province, Iran. At the 2006 census, its population was 189, in 27 families.
