= Ab Bidak, Fars =

Ab Bidak اب بيدك
- Village
- Location within Iran
- Coordinates: 28°31′10″N 52°49′06″E
- Country: Iran
- Province: Fars
- County: Qir and Karzin
- Bakhsh: Central
- Rural District: Fathabad

Population (2006)
  - Total: 36
- Time zone: UTC+3:30 (IRST)
  - Summer (DST): UTC+4:30 (IRDT)

Ab Bidak (Persian: اب بيدك, also Romanized as Āb Bīdak) is a village in Fathabad Rural District, in the Central District of Qir and Karzin County, Fars province, Iran. At the 2006 census, its population was 36, in 8 families.
