= Shahrak-e Shomali =

Village in Fars province, Iran

Shahrak-e Shomali Persian: شهرك شمالي
- Village
- Country: {Iran
- Province: Fars
- County: Qir and Karzin
- District: Efzar
- Rural District: Efzar

Population (2016)
  - Total: 1,381
- Time zone: UTC+3:30 (IRST)

Shahrak-e Shomali (Persian: شهرك شمالي) (Note: Also romanized as Shahrak-e Shomālī) is a village in, and the capital of, Efzar Rural District of Efzar District, Qir and Karzin County, Fars province, Iran.

== Demographics ==
=== Population ===
At the time of the 2006 National Census, the village's population was 1,587 in 337 households. The following census in 2011 counted 1,410 people in 378 households. The 2016 census measured the population of the village as 1,381 people in 414 households.
