= Chedruyeh =

Chedruyeh چدرويه
- Village
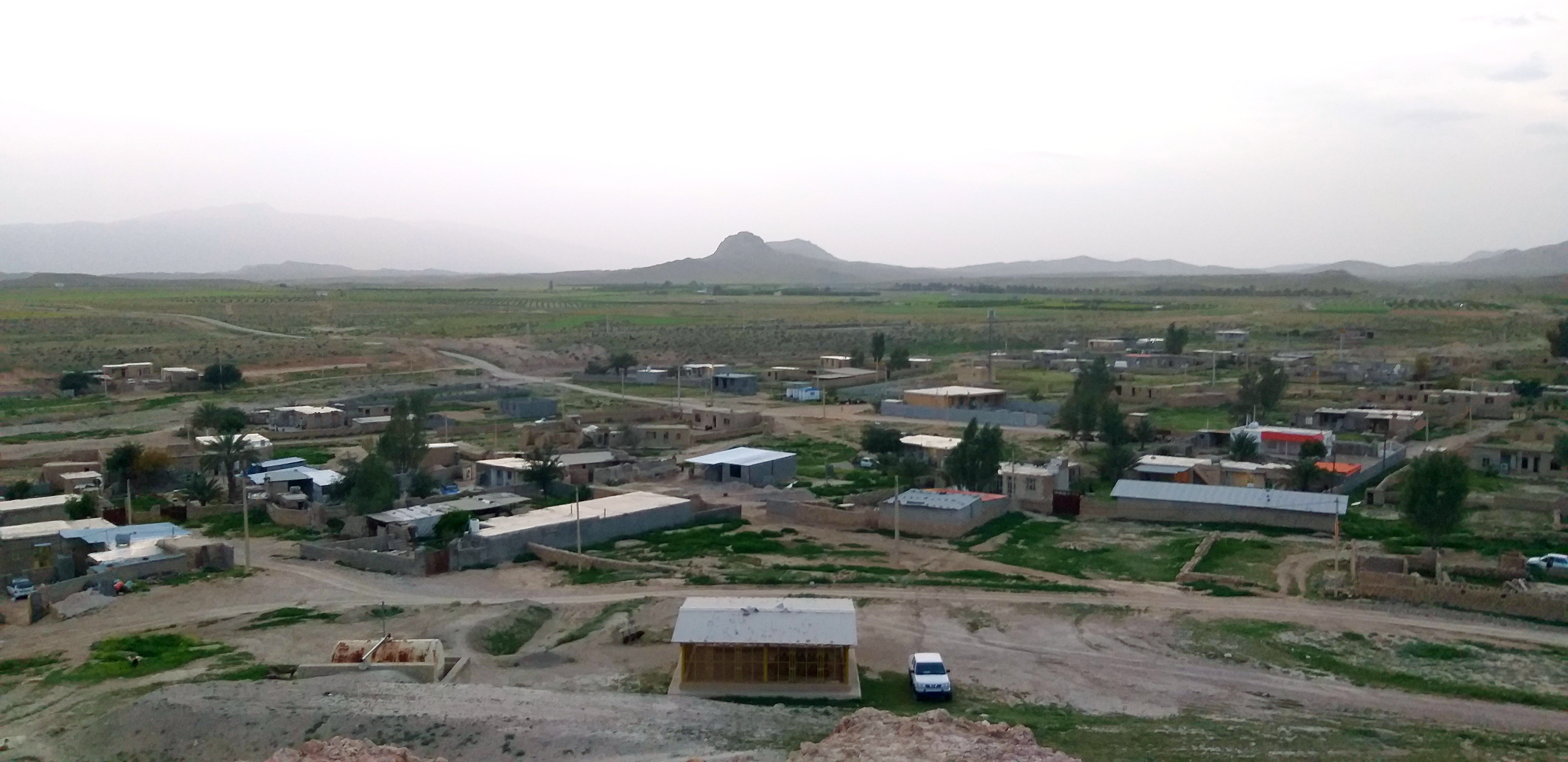

- Location within Iran
- Coordinates: 28°45′01″N 53°35′46″E
- Country: Iran
- Province: Fars
- County: Jahrom
- Bakhsh: Kordian
- Rural District: Qotbabad

Population (2006)
  - Total: 262
- Time zone: UTC+3:30 (IRST)
  - Summer (DST): UTC+4:30 (IRDT)

Chedruyeh (Persian: چدرويه, also Romanized as Chedrūyeh) is a village in Qotbabad Rural District, Kordian District, Jahrom County, Fars province, Iran. At the 2006 census, its population was 262, in 66 families.
