= Mozaffari, Qir and Karzin =

Village in Fars province, Iran

Mozaffari Persian: مظفری
- Village
- Location within Iran
- Coordinates: 28°19′20″N 52°58′51″E
- Country: Iran
- Province: Fars
- County: Qir and Karzin
- District: Efzar
- Rural District: Efzar

Population (2016)
  - Total: 1,573
- Time zone: UTC+3:30 (IRST)

Mozaffari (Persian: مظفری) (Note: Also romanized as Moz̧affarī; also known as Muz̧affarī) is a village in Efzar Rural District of Efzar District, Qir and Karzin County, Fars province, Iran.

== Demographics ==
=== Population ===
At the time of the 2006 National Census, the village's population was 1,333 in 303 households. The following census in 2011 counted 1,329 people in 367 households. The 2016 census measured the population of the village as 1,573 people in 454 households. It was the most populous village in its rural district.
