= Sholdan, Qir and Karzin =

Sholdan شلدان
- Village
- Location within Iran
- Coordinates: 28°33′45″N 53°00′28″E
- Country: Iran
- Province: Fars
- County: Qir and Karzin
- Bakhsh: Central
- Rural District: Fathabad

Population (2006)
  - Total: 46
- Time zone: UTC+3:30 (IRST)
  - Summer (DST): UTC+4:30 (IRDT)

Sholdan (Persian: شلدان, also Romanized as Sholdān and Shaldān; also known as Shaldūn) is a village in Fathabad Rural District, in the Central District of Qir and Karzin County, Fars province, Iran. At the 2006 census, its population was 46, in 9 families.
