= Madavan, Jahrom =

Madavan مادوان
- Village
- Location within Iran
- Coordinates: 28°35′29″N 53°46′31″E
- Country: Iran
- Province: Fars
- County: Jahrom
- Bakhsh: Kordian
- Rural District: Alaviyeh

Population (2006)
  - Total: 22
- Time zone: UTC+3:30 (IRST)
  - Summer (DST): UTC+4:30 (IRDT)

Madavan (Persian: مادوان, also Romanized as Mādavān) is a village in Alaviyeh Rural District, Kordian District, Jahrom County, Fars province, Iran. At the 2006 census, its population was 22, in 6 families.
