= Asiri =

ASIRI is Asosiasi Industri Rekaman Indonesia, an association in Indonesia

Asiri or ASIRI may also relate to:

- Al-Asiri, a surname in Arabic
- Asiri Hospital Holdings, a hospital group in Sri Lanka
- Hoseyni, Yazd, a village in Iran also known as ’aşīrī

== See also ==
- Asir (disambiguation)
