= Bisheh Zard =

Bisheh Zard (Persian: بیشه‌زرد) may refer to:

- Bisheh Zard, Fasa
- Bisheh Zard, Qir and Karzin
