= Chenar-e Sukhteh, Jahrom =

Chenar-e Sukhteh چنارسوخته
- Village
- Location within Iran
- Coordinates: 28°28′32″N 53°49′02″E
- Country: Iran
- Province: Fars
- County: Jahrom
- Bakhsh: Kordian
- Rural District: Alaviyeh

Population (2006)
  - Total: 330
- Time zone: UTC+3:30 (IRST)
  - Summer (DST): UTC+4:30 (IRDT)

Chenar-e Sukhteh (Persian: چنارسوخته, also Romanized as Chenār-e Sūkhteh and Chenār Sūkhteh; also known as Chenār Sūkhteh va Toshak) is a village in Alaviyeh Rural District, Kordian District, Jahrom County, Fars province, Iran. At the 2006 census, its population was 330, in 57 families.
