= Bagh-e Now, Fars =

Bagh-e Now باغ نو
- Village
- Location within Iran
- Coordinates: 28°23′07″N 52°36′45″E
- Country: Iran
- Province: Fars
- County: Qir and Karzin
- Bakhsh: Central
- Rural District: Hangam

Population (2006)
  - Total: 430
- Time zone: UTC+3:30 (IRST)
  - Summer (DST): UTC+4:30 (IRDT)

Bagh-e Now (Persian: باغ نو, also Romanized as Bāgh-e Now) is a village in Hangam Rural District, in the Central District of Qir and Karzin County, Fars province, Iran. At the 2006 census, its population was 430, in 77 families.
