= Chah Kabkan =

Village in Fars province, Iran

Chah Kabkan Persian: چاه كبكان
- Village
- Location within Iran
- Coordinates: 27°42′30″N 52°36′52″E
- Country: Iran
- Province: Fars
- County: Mohr
- District: Asir
- Rural District: Asir

Population (2016)
  - Total: 2,150
- Time zone: UTC+3:30 (IRST)

Chah Kabkan (Persian: چاه كبكان) (Note: Also romanized as Chāh Kabkān; also known as Chāh-e Kabgān) is a village in Asir Rural District of Asir District, Mohr County, Fars province, Iran.

== Demographics ==
=== Population ===
At the time of the 2006 National Census, the village's population was 1,291 in 261 households. The following census in 2011 counted 1,285 people in 295 households. The 2016 census measured the population of the village as 2,150 people in 396 households. It was the most populous village in its rural district.

== Overview ==
Foothill village in Fars Province October city is captured the captured villages. The village has more than 1,600 people and has an area of 3 km educational facilities include kindergarten, elementary school girl girls Vpsranh Vmdrs·h Rahmnmayy Vpsranh, home health, home of the world, the cultural center of Ashura / Syed Shuhada Mosque, and ... a basic need a high school in the village feeling. This village is great potential in agriculture.

The initial core of the village wells Kbkan by nomads (left) and gradually attach cattle breeders in mountain areas (Bndv- Bnakvrvyh- Hndvnv ...), known as Baluchi tribe and dark black hat (black head) and the building land and the water in the well in the courtyard of the building in the last 40 years (1350 AD onwards) was formed, and over time has attracted large crowds.

Kbkan simple appellation of village wells meant wells (wells and historical Fnat / water flow at ground level) and Quebec and Quebec means the location is in the well. The primary winding and narrow streets of the village is made in the context of the divisive parts are irregular shaped to follow the effects of natural land and the ownership of indigenous Astmsalh old and traditional villages such as rocks, soil, trunks of palm (roof ) and its branches (shed and brick houses)

New materials: stone, cement, gypsum, blocks, block and brick coverings and the migration of industrial and service business in the South Pars Special Energy Zone (Assaluyeh) as a destination and the place of employment is. Services and activities within the rural residential land use, roads, commercial (Super Markt- bakery-Bqaly- taxi Tlfny- Qsaby- the fuel, etc.), user training, user religious (4 Hsynyh- a mosque). bottom neighborhood) and village local high street names such as streets teacher from East to West, Imam Hussein, Ashura, Farabi, palm, province of Quebec, Amir Kabir and is Chamran martyr.

The most important power in the village well in terms of population Jvan- capital Kbkan financial situation of Meyer route network in Bushehr province (intersection of Highway Rancher - Daralmyzan- Firozabad and communication path Kngan- city of Assaluyeh), given suitable jobs to get on the shortest residential point of Fars Province and two South Pars site, features an impressive variety of different fields and spheres of influence . Rural development and comprehensive planning (various developments) should be made to improve conditions and quality of life for the majority of the people. (Tghyyr- development and progress)
