= Yurd Dasht-e Zalzaleh =

Yurd Dasht-e Zalzaleh يورددشت زلزله
- Village
- Country: Iran
- Province: Fars
- County: Jahrom
- Bakhsh: Kordian
- Rural District: Qotbabad

Population (2006)
  - Total: 31
- Time zone: UTC+3:30 (IRST)
  - Summer (DST): UTC+4:30 (IRDT)

Yurd Dasht-e Zalzaleh (Persian: يورددشت زلزله, also Romanized as Yūrd Dasht-e Zalzaleh) is a village in Qotbabad Rural District, Kordian District, Jahrom County, Fars province, Iran. At the 2006 census, its population was 31, in 9 families.
