= Mazru =

Mazru مزرو
- Village
- Location within Iran
- Coordinates: 28°51′26″N 54°28′08″E
- Country: Iran
- Province: Fars
- County: Jahrom
- Bakhsh: Kordian
- Rural District: Alaviyeh

Population (2006)
  - Total: 41
- Time zone: UTC+3:30 (IRST)
  - Summer (DST): UTC+4:30 (IRDT)

Mazru (Persian: مزرو, also Romanized as Mazrū, Mazroo, and Mazrow; also known as Marrū) is a village in Alaviyeh Rural District, Kordian District, Jahrom County, Fars province, Iran. At the 2006 census, its population was 41, in 5 families.
