= Shahrak-e Ahmadiyeh =

Shahrak-e Ahmadiyeh شهرک احمدیه
- Village
- Location within Iran
- Coordinates: 28°45′39.97″N 53°24′56.26″E
- Country: Iran
- Province: Fars
- County: Jahrom
- Bakhsh: Kordian
- Rural District: Qotbabad

Population (2016)
  - Total: 47
- Time zone: UTC+3:30 (IRST)
  - Summer (DST): UTC+4:30 (IRDT)

Shahrak-e Ahmadiyeh (Persian: شهرک احمدیه) is a village in Qotbabad Rural District, Kordian District, Jahrom County, Fars province, Iran. At the 2016 census, its population was 47, in 23 families.
