= Shahrak-e Hengam =

Village in Fars province, Iran

Shahrak-e Hengam Persian: شهرك هنگام
- Village
- Location within Iran
- Coordinates: 28°21′51″N 52°35′42″E
- Country: Iran
- Province: Fars
- County: Qir and Karzin
- District: Central
- Rural District: Hengam

Population (2016)
  - Total: 1,432
- Time zone: UTC+3:30 (IRST)

Shahrak-e Hengam (Persian: شهرك هنگام) (Note: Also romanized as Shahrak-e Hangam and Shahrak-e Hangām; also known as Hangām) is a village in, and the capital of, Hengam Rural District of the Central District of Qir and Karzin County, Fars province, Iran.

== Demographics ==
=== Population ===
At the time of the 2006 National Census, the village's population was 1,520 in 325 households. The following census in 2011 counted 1,609 people in 456 households. The 2016 census measured the population of the village as 1,432 people in 437 households. It was the most populous village in its rural district.
