= Hormuj =

Hormuj هرموج
- Village
- Location within Iran
- Coordinates: 28°32′32″N 53°44′27″E
- Country: Iran
- Province: Fars
- County: Jahrom
- Bakhsh: Kordian
- Rural District: Alaviyeh

Population (2006)
  - Total: 615
- Time zone: UTC+3:30 (IRST)
  - Summer (DST): UTC+4:30 (IRDT)

Hormuj (Persian: هرموج, also Romanized as Hormūj; also known as Hormūj-e Soflá) is a village in Alaviyeh Rural District, Kordian District, Jahrom County, Fars province, Iran. At the 2006 census, its population was 615, in 149 families.
