= Danyan =

Danyan may refer to:

- Bahnea, Romania
- Danian, Iran (disambiguation)
