= Goldamcheh =

Village in Fars province, Iran

Goldamcheh Persian: گلدامچه
- Village
- Location within Iran
- Coordinates: 28°38′38″N 53°31′11″E
- Country: Iran
- Province: Fars
- County: Jahrom
- District: Kordian
- Rural District: Qotbabad

Population (2016)
  - Total: 548
- Time zone: UTC+3:30 (IRST)

Goldamcheh (Persian: گلدامچه) (Note: Also romanized as Goldāmcheh) is a village in Qotbabad Rural District of Kordian District, Jahrom County, Fars province, Iran.

== Demographics ==
=== Population ===
At the time of the 2006 National Census, the village's population was 557 in 125 households. The following census in 2011 counted 553 people in 163 households. The 2016 census measured the population of the village as 548 people in 164 households. It was the most populous village in its rural district.
