= Baba Arab =

Village in Fars province, Iran

Baba Arab Persian: باباعرب
- Village
- Location within Iran
- Coordinates: 28°34′49″N 53°46′00″E
- Country: Iran
- Province: Fars
- County: Jahrom
- District: Kordian
- Rural District: Alaviyeh

Population (2016)
  - Total: 2,208
- Time zone: UTC+3:30 (IRST)

Baba Arab (Persian: باباعرب) (Note: Also romanized as Bābā ‘Arab; also known as ‘Alavīyeh, Bāb-e ‘Arab, and Bāb-i-Arab) is a village in, and the capital of, Alaviyeh Rural District of Kordian District, Jahrom County, Fars province, Iran.

== Demographics ==
=== Population ===
At the time of the 2006 National Census, the village's population was 2,238 in 537 households. The following census in 2011 counted 1,992 people in 551 households. The 2016 census measured the population of the village as 2,208 people in 715 households.
