= Hamzehkhani Castle =

Castle in Fars province, Iran

Hamzehkhani castle
- قلعه حمزه خانی

General information
- Type: Castle
- Location: Qir and Karzin County, Iran

Hamzehkhani castle (Persian: قلعه حمزه خانی) is a historical castle located in Qir and Karzin County in Fars province, The longevity of this fortress dates back to the Qajar dynasty.
