= Danian, Fars =

Danian دنيان
- Village
- Location within Iran
- Coordinates: 28°30′46″N 53°46′04″E
- Country: Iran
- Province: Fars
- County: Jahrom
- Bakhsh: Kordian
- Rural District: Alaviyeh

Population (2006)
  - Total: 266
- Time zone: UTC+3:30 (IRST)
  - Summer (DST): UTC+4:30 (IRDT)

Danian (Persian: دنيان, also Romanized as Danīan, Danyān, Denīān, and Denyān) is a village in Alaviyeh Rural District, Kordian District, Jahrom County, Fars province, Iran. At the 2006 census, its population was 266, in 74 families.
