= Pain Kuh =

Pain Kuh or Paeenkuh (Persian: پائين كوه) may refer to:

- Pain Kuh, Fars
- Pain Kuh, Zanjan
