= Musaviyeh, Jahrom =

Village in Fars province, Iran

Musaviyeh Persian: موسویه
- Village
- Location within Iran
- Coordinates: 28°37′06″N 53°43′03″E
- Country: Iran
- Province: Fars
- County: Jahrom
- District: Kordian
- Rural District: Alaviyeh

Population (2016)
  - Total: 2,217
- Time zone: UTC+3:30 (IRST)

Musaviyeh (Persian: موسویه) (Note: Also romanized as Mūsavīyeh and Musuyeh; also known as Mousoye; formerly Deh Zir (دهزير),) is a village in Alaviyeh Rural District of Kordian District, Jahrom County, Fars province, Iran.

== Demographics ==
=== Population ===
At the time of the 2006 National Census, the village's population was 2,261 in 577 households. The following census in 2011 counted 2,127 people in 613 households. The 2016 census measured the population of the village as 2,217 people in 783 households. It was the most populous village in its rural district.
