= Danian, Iran =

Danian (Persian: دنيان or دانيان) in Iran may refer to:

- Danian, Fars (دنيان - Danīān)
- Danian, Markazi (دانيان - Dānīān)
