= Sholdan =

Sholdan or Shaldan (Persian: شلدان) may refer to:

- Sholdan va Baghi, Bushehr province
- Sholdan, Bushehr
- Sholdan, Qir and Karzin, Fars province
