= Band-e Bast, Fars =

Band-e Bast بندبست
- Village
- Location within Iran
- Coordinates: 28°41′33″N 53°32′54″E
- Country: Iran
- Province: Fars
- County: Jahrom
- Bakhsh: Kordian
- Rural District: Qotbabad

Population (2006)
  - Total: 41
- Time zone: UTC+3:30 (IRST)
  - Summer (DST): UTC+4:30 (IRDT)

Band-e Bast (Persian: بندبست) is a village in Qotbabad Rural District, Kordian District, Jahrom County, Fars province, Iran. At the 2006 census, its population was 41, in 8 families.
