= Bagh-e Now =

Bagh-e Now (Persian: باغ نو) may refer to:

- Bagh-e Now, Fars
- Bagh-e Now, Qom
- Bagh-e Now, Razavi Khorasan
- Bagh-e Now, Yazd
