= Ayodeji Karim =

Nigerian politician

Ayodeji Ismail Karim
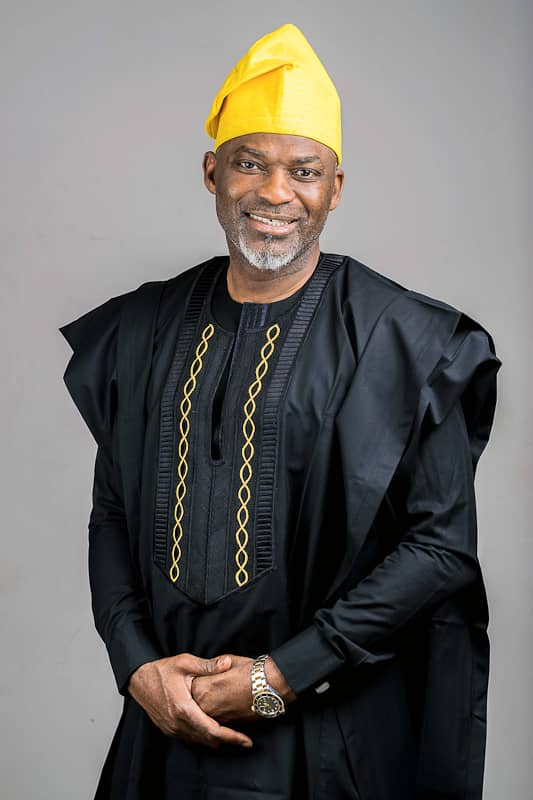

Personal details
- Born: December 18, 1970 (age 55) Ibadan North East, Oyo State, Nigeria
- Party: All Progressive Congress (APC)
- Education: South Thames College Wandsworth, London; University of Wales, Swansea, UK.
- Occupation: Politician, businessman, chief executive officer of costain west africa plc
- Website: ayodejikarim.com

Ayodeji Ismail Karim// (born December 18, 1970) is the managing director/CEO of Costain West Africa Plc.

== Early life and education ==
Ayodeji Ismail Karim (born December 18, 1970) to the family of Dauda Adebayo Karim in Ibadan North East LGA, Oyo State.

He had his primary education at St George's Boys School, Falomo, Ikoyi, Lagos and his secondary education at the Metropolitan College, Isolo before proceeding to South Thames College, Wandsworth, London where he obtained a National Diploma in Electro/Mechanical Sciences. He also holds a degree in Bachelor of Materials Engineering and Engineering Design/Manufacturing both from the University of Wales, Swansea, UK.

== Career and business ==
Ayodeji worked as a Manager at Le Pain Croissant Ltd, Southall UK, before advancing to Charles Walden & Associates Company Ltd UK as Projects Team Lead. He was chief executive officer at Fortis Construction Company Ltd and was employed by Costain West Africa Plc, in Feb. 2007 as Operations Director; He rose to become the managing director/chief executive officer of the construction giant in January 2010, a position he has held to date.

He is the President/CEO of Winchester Farms Ltd. He is one of the corporate leaders in the country.

== Professional training and politics ==
Ayodeji had military training, which spanned through Territorial Army (4th Royal Green Jackets) Basic Infantry Training & Fitness, Senior Rifleman British Army, and Officer cadet, Royal Engineers Advanced Infantry Training, Military Qualification Part 2, UK. He is an Alumnus of the University of Wales Officer Training Corps Wales, British Army, UK.

He is a candidate for the All Progressive Congress (APC) at the Oyo State Gubernatorial election for 2019.

== Personal life ==
Ayodeji Ismail Karim is married and has children.
