= Umidgarh =

Umidgarh (Urdu: اُمِید گڑھ), is a union council of Kabirwala Tehsil in Khanewal District, Pakistan. The main social groups are the Kharal (Khan), Pahor, Haraj, Gujjar, Watto, Mahni, and Rajput. They speak Punjabi and Saraiki languages.

It has very fertile land. Cotton and rice are its main crops.
