= Mobarakabad, Qir and Karzin =

City in Fars province, Iran

Mobarakabad Persian: مبارک‌آباد
- City
- Location within Iran
- Coordinates: 28°21′32″N 53°19′43″E
- Country: Iran
- Province: Fars
- County: Qir and Karzin
- District: Central

Population (2016)
  - Total: 4,707
- Time zone: UTC+3:30 (IRST)

Mobarakabad (Persian: مبارک‌آباد) (Note: Also romanized as Mobārakābād; also known as Mubārakābād) is a city in the Central District of Qir and Karzin County, Fars province, Iran, serving as the administrative center for Mobarakabad Rural District.

== Demographics ==
=== Population ===
At the time of the 2006 National Census, Mobarakabad's population was 4,230 in 880 households, when it was a village in Mobarakabad Rural District. The following census in 2011 counted 4,235 people in 1,053 households, by which time the village had been elevated to the status of a city. The 2016 census measured the population of the city as 4,707 people in 1,319 households.
