= Karzin =

City in Fars province, Iran

Karzin Persian: كارزين
- City
- Location within Iran
- Coordinates: 28°24′34″N 53°06′36″E
- Country: Iran
- Province: Fars
- County: Qir and Karzin
- District: Central

Population (2016)
  - Total: 8,841
- Time zone: UTC+3:30 (IRST)

Karzin (Persian: كارزين) (Note: Also romanized as Kārzīn; formerly Fathabad (فتح آباد), also romanized as Fatḩābād) is a city in the Central District of Qir and Karzin County, Fars province, Iran, serving as the administrative center for Fathabad Rural District.

== Demographics ==
=== Population ===
At the time of the 2006 National Census, the city's population was 7,953 in 1,651 households. The following census in 2011 counted 8,446 people in 2,153 households. The 2016 census measured the population of the city as 8,841 people in 2,520 households.
