= Fal, Fars =

City in Fars province, Iran

Fal Persian: فال
- City
- Location within Iran
- Coordinates: 27°37′47″N 52°41′57″E
- Country: Iran
- Province: Fars
- County: Mohr
- District: Galleh Dar

Population (2016)
  - Total: 3,757
- Time zone: UTC+3:30 (IRST)

Fal (Persian: فال) (Note: Also romanized as Fāl and Fāll) is a city in Galleh Dar District of Mohr County, Fars province, Iran. As a village, Fal was the capital of Fal Rural District until the capital was transferred to the village of Hajjiabad.

== Demographics ==
=== Population ===
At the time of the 2006 National Census, Fal's population was 3,368 in 652 households, when it was a village in Fal Rural District. The following census in 2011 counted 3,691 people in 870 households. The 2016 census measured the population of the village as 3,757 people in 976 households. It was the most populous village in its rural district.

After the census, Fal was elevated to the status of a city.
