= Qotbabad =

City in Fars province, Iran

Qotbabad Persian: قطب‌آباد
- City
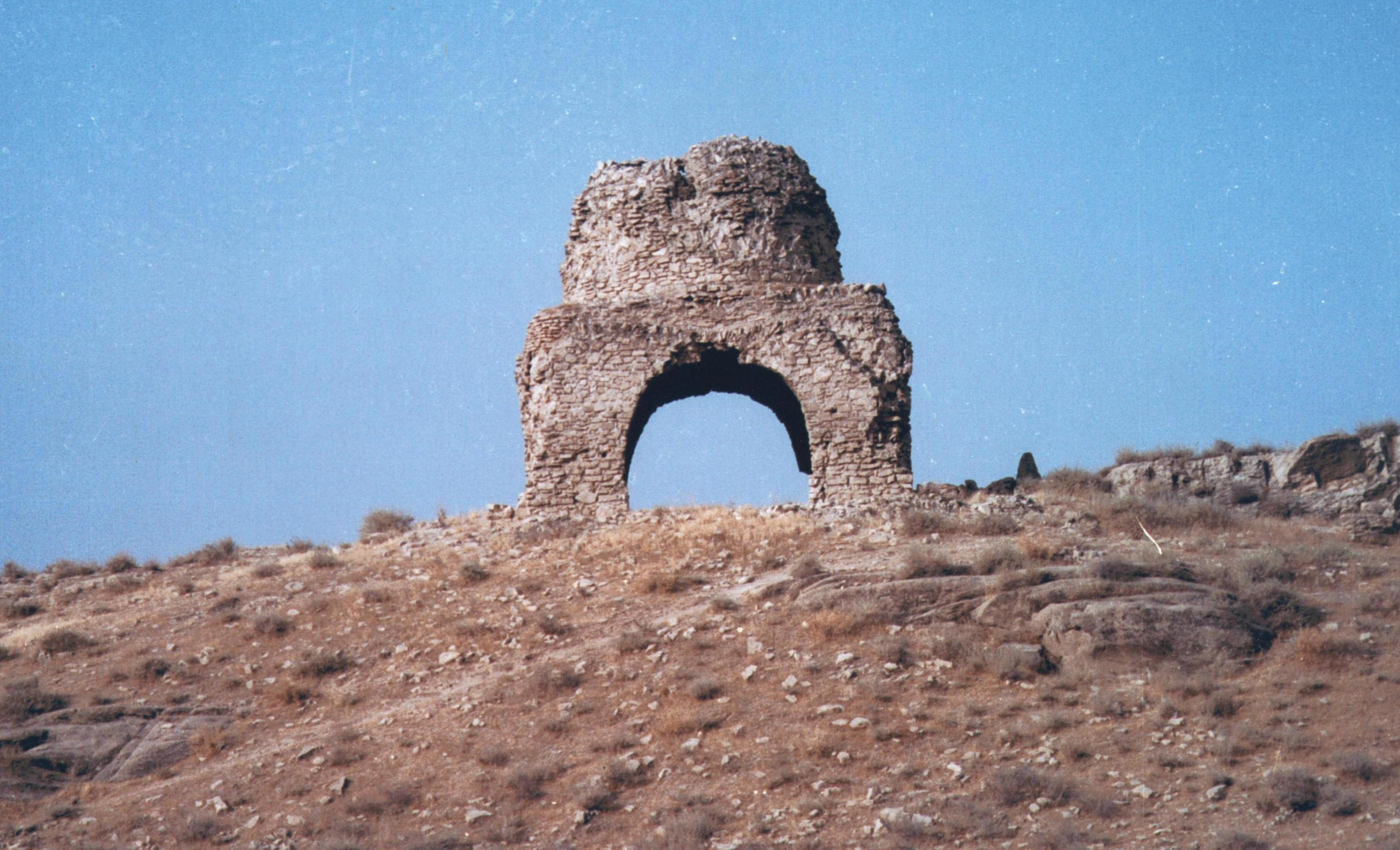
- The old fire temple

- Location within Iran
- Coordinates: 28°38′17″N 53°38′21″E
- Country: Iran
- Province: Fars
- County: Jahrom
- District: Kordian

Population (2016)
  - Total: 7,476
- Time zone: UTC+3:30 (IRST)

Qotbabad (Persian: قطب‌آباد) (Note: Also romanized as Qoţbābād; also known as Kowtbābād and Qutbābād) is a city in, and the capital of, Kordian District of Jahrom County, Fars province, Iran. It also serves as the administrative center for Qotbabad Rural District.

== Demographics ==
=== Population ===
At the time of the 2006 National Census, the city's population was 6,450 in 1,581 households. The following census in 2011 counted 6,754 people in 1,825 households. The 2016 census measured the population of the city as 7,476 people in 2,250 households.
