= Shahrak-e Emam Khomeyni, Mohr =

Village in Fars province, Iran

Shahrak-e Emam Khomeyni Persian: شهرك امام خميني
- Village
- Location within Iran
- Coordinates: 27°44′42″N 52°36′15″E
- Country: Iran
- Province: Fars
- County: Mohr
- District: Asir
- Rural District: Dasht-e Laleh

Population (2016)
  - Total: 1,770
- Time zone: UTC+3:30 (IRST)

Shahrak-e Emam Khomeyni (Persian: شهرك امام خميني) (Note: Also romanized as Shahrak-e Emām Khomeynī; also known as Shahrak-e Emām) is a village in, and the capital of, Dasht-e Laleh Rural District of Asir District, Mohr County, Fars province, Iran.

== Demographics ==
=== Population ===
At the time of the 2006 National Census, the village's population was 1,376 in 284 households. The following census in 2011 counted 1,396 people in 353 households. The 2016 census measured the population of the village as 1,770 people in 458 households. It was the most populous village in its rural district.
