= Efzar =

City in Fars province, Iran

Efzar Persian: افزر
- City
- Location within Iran
- Coordinates: 28°20′49″N 52°57′59″E
- Country: Iran
- Province: Fars
- County: Qir and Karzin
- District: Efzar

Population (2016)
  - Total: 2,657
- Time zone: UTC+3:30 (IRST)

Efzar (Persian: افزر) (Note: Formerly Marand (مرند); also known as Marand Ābādeh) is a city in, and the capital of, Efzar District of Qir and Karzin County, Fars province, Iran.

== Demographics ==
=== Population ===
At the time of the 2006 National Census, the city's population was 2,243 in 470 households. The following census in 2011 counted 2,338 people in 630 households. The 2016 census measured the population of the city as 2,657 people in 731 households.
