= Qir =

City in Fars province, Iran

Qir Persian: قير
- City
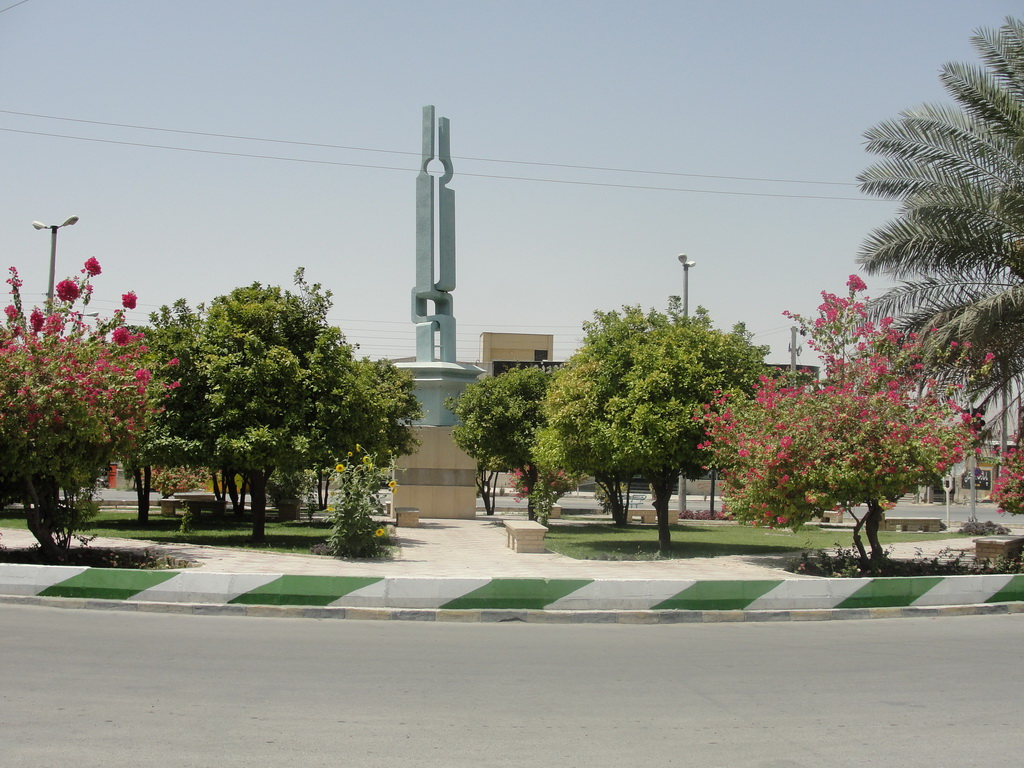
- Shohada square

- Location within Iran
- Coordinates: 28°29′01″N 53°02′12″E
- Country: Iran
- Province: Fars
- County: Qir and Karzin
- District: Central
- Elevation: 771 m (2,530 ft)

Population (2016)
  - Total: 20,010
- Time zone: UTC+3:30 (IRST)

Qir (Persian: قير) (Note: Also romanized as Qīr; also known as Gheer) is a city in the Central District of Qir and Karzin County, Fars province, Iran, serving as capital of both the county and the district. The city has an altitude of 771 metres (2,530 ft).

== History ==
On 10 April 1972, Qir was destroyed by a large earthquake, killing 3,399 people, two-thirds of the population at that time.

== Demographics ==
=== Population ===
At the time of the 2006 National Census, the city's population was 16,839 in 3,722 households. The following census in 2011 counted 18,038 people in 4,603 households. The 2016 census measured the population of the city as 20,010 people in 5,650 households.
