= Costain West Africa =

Nigerian building and civil engineering firm

Costain West Africa is a building and civil engineering firm founded in Nigeria in 1948. Notably, it was the first building and civil engineering firm to be listed on the Nigerian Stock Exchange. The company has undertaken various significant projects, including the construction of the 140-meter-high NECOM house, which was built over loose sands using a shallow raft foundation design, as well as the University College Teaching Hospital in Ibadan. As one of the oldest civil engineering and building companies established in Nigeria, Costain West Africa executed highway, road, building, and civil works projects in both the private and public sectors from 1950 to the end of the twentieth century. However, in recent years, the company's fortunes have been mixed, with occasional difficulties in meeting its obligations.

== History ==
Costain West Africa was established in 1948 as a civil engineering and building company with substantial shareholdings held by John Holt Plc. It was founded as a subsidiary of Richard Costain. Involved in projects in all regions of the country, in the mid-1950s, the firm completed civil works at Ijora Power Station and extension of Apapa Wharf, and its building division built Bishopscourt along the Marina, Lagos. In 1957, a partnership with CDC and the government of Northern Nigeria led to the construction of a housing estate in Kaduna, the firm was involved in the construction of Wuya bridge over Kaduna River a Bida and Shell estates in Port Harcourt.

In 1982, the company won a state bid that gave it one of its biggest orders, a project to develop Oyo State water supply system.

== Projects ==
- Ahmadu Bello Stadium, Kaduna work order from the regional Ministry of Social Welfare and Cooperatives, Northern Nigeria.
- Bata Shoe factory.
- Phase II Nigerian Telecommunication System
- Central Bank, Enugu
- Apapa factory of Flour Mills of Nigeria.
