= Hoseyni, Yazd =

Hoseyni حسيني
- Village
- Location within Iran
- Coordinates: 31°46′21″N 54°13′23″E
- Country: Iran
- Province: Yazd
- County: Taft
- Bakhsh: Central
- Rural District: Pishkuh

Population (2006)
  - Total: 880
- Time zone: UTC+3:30 (IRST)
  - Summer (DST): UTC+4:30 (IRDT)

Hoseyni (Persian: حسيني, also Romanized as Ḩoseynī and Hoseini; also known as ’aşīrī, Husaini, and ’oseynī) is a village in Pishkuh Rural District, in the Central District of Taft County, Yazd Province, Iran. At the 2006 census, its population was 880, in 145 families.
