= Shahrak Emam Khomeyni, Kerman =

Shahrak Emam Khomeyni شهرك امام خميني
- Village
- Country: Iran
- Province: Kerman
- County: Manujan
- Bakhsh: Central
- Rural District: Qaleh

Population (2006)
  - Total: 912
- Time zone: UTC+3:30 (IRST)
  - Summer (DST): UTC+4:30 (IRDT)

Shahrak Emam Khomeyni (Persian: شهرك امام خميني, also Romanized as Shahrak Emām Khomeynī) is a village in Qaleh Rural District, in the Central District of Manujan County, Kerman Province, Iran. At the 2006 census, its population was 912, in 189 families.
