= Emam Shahr, Fars =

City in Fars province, Iran

Emam Shahr Persian: امام شهر
- City
- Location within Iran
- Coordinates: 28°26′49″N 53°09′07″E
- Country: Iran
- Province: Fars
- County: Qir and Karzin
- District: Central

Population (2016)
  - Total: 5,803
- Time zone: UTC+3:30 (IRST)

Emam Shahr (Persian: امام شهر) (Note: Formerly Shahrak-e Emam (شهرك امام), also romanized as Shahrak-e Emām; also known as Shahrak-e Emām Khomeynī) is a city in the Central District of Qir and Karzin County, Fars province, Iran.

== Demographics ==
=== Population ===
At the time of the 2006 National Census, the population was 4,973 in 1,073 households, when it was a village in Fathabad Rural District. The following census in 2011 counted 5,190 people in 1,399 households, by which time the village had been elevated to the status of a city. The 2016 census measured the population of the city as 5,803 people in 1,607 households.
