= Ab Bad-e Sivandi =

Ab Bad-e Sivandi اببادسيوندي
- Village
- Location within Iran
- Coordinates: 28°49′27″N 56°15′15″E
- Country: Iran
- Province: Kerman
- County: Baft
- Bakhsh: Central
- Rural District: Khabar

Population (2006)
  - Total: 59
- Time zone: UTC+3:30 (IRST)
  - Summer (DST): UTC+4:30 (IRDT)

Ab Bad-e Sivandi (Persian: اببادسيوندي, also Romanized as Āb Bād-e Sīvandī; also known as Āb Bād) is a village in Khabar Rural District, in the Central District of Baft County, Kerman Province, Iran. At the 2006 census, its population was 59, in 10 families.
