= Ab Bad, Faryab =

Ab Bad اب باد
- Village
- Location within Iran
- Coordinates: 28°18′37″N 57°02′30″E
- Country: Iran
- Province: Kerman
- County: Faryab
- Bakhsh: Central
- Rural District: Hur

Population (2006)
  - Total: 219
- Time zone: UTC+3:30 (IRST)
  - Summer (DST): UTC+4:30 (IRDT)

Ab Bad (Persian: اب باد, also Romanized as Āb Bād; also known as Āb Bār) is a village in Hur Rural District, in the Central District of Faryab County, Kerman province, Iran. At the 2006 census, its population was 219, in 52 families.
