= Sar Chah-e Duruznab =

Sar Chah-e Duruznab سرچاه دوروزناب
- Village
- Location within Iran
- Coordinates: 32°48′07″N 48°21′33″E
- Country: Iran
- Province: Khuzestan
- County: Andimeshk
- Bakhsh: Alvar-e Garmsiri
- Rural District: Qilab

Population (2006)
  - Total: 116
- Time zone: UTC+3:30 (IRST)
  - Summer (DST): UTC+4:30 (IRDT)

Sar Chah-e Duruznab (Persian: سرچاه دوروزناب, also Romanized as Sar Chāh-e Dūrūznāb; also known as Sar Chāh) is a village in Qilab Rural District, Alvar-e Garmsiri District, Andimeshk County, Khuzestan Province, Iran. At the 2006 census, its population was 116, in 23 families.
