= Danian, Markazi =

Danian دانيان
- Village
- Location within Iran
- Coordinates: 33°39′33″N 50°00′43″E
- Country: Iran
- Province: Markazi
- County: Khomeyn
- Bakhsh: Kamareh
- Rural District: Khorram Dasht

Population (2006)
  - Total: 114
- Time zone: UTC+3:30 (IRST)
  - Summer (DST): UTC+4:30 (IRDT)

Danian (Persian: دانيان, also Romanized as Dānīān, Dāneyān, Dānyāl, and Daniyan) is a village in Khorram Dasht Rural District, Kamareh District, Khomeyn County, Markazi Province, Iran. At the 2006 census, its population was 114, in 37 families.
