= Galleh Dar, Bavanat =

Galleh Dar گله دار
- Village
- Location within Iran
- Coordinates: 30°22′09″N 53°23′49″E
- Country: Iran
- Province: Fars
- County: Bavanat
- Bakhsh: Central
- Rural District: Simakan

Population (2006)
  - Total: 85
- Time zone: UTC+3:30 (IRST)
  - Summer (DST): UTC+4:30 (IRDT)

Galleh Dar (Persian: گله دار, also Romanized as Galleh Dār and Galeh Dār; also known as Galleh Dār-e Bālā, Gilehdār, and Qal‘eh Dar) is a village in Simakan Rural District, in the Central District of Bavanat County, Fars province, Iran. At the 2006 census, its population was 85, in 24 families.
