= Shahrak-e Emam Khomeyni, Eqlid =

Shahrak-e Emam Khomeyni شهرك امام خميني
- Village
- Country: Iran
- Province: Fars
- County: Eqlid
- Bakhsh: Sedeh
- Rural District: Aspas

Population (2006)
  - Total: 298
- Time zone: UTC+3:30 (IRST)
  - Summer (DST): UTC+4:30 (IRDT)

Shahrak-e Emam Khomeyni (Persian: شهرك امام خميني, also Romanized as Shahrak-e Emām Khomeynī) is a village in Aspas Rural District, Sedeh District, Eqlid County, Fars province, Iran. At the 2006 census, its population was 298, in 62 families.
