= Al-Asiri =

Al-Asiri is an Arabic toponymic surname (nisba) meaning someone from Asir. Notable people with the surname include:

- Abdullah al-Asiri (1986–2009), a Saudi Arabian al-Qaeda suicide bomber
- Ahmed Al-Assiri (disambiguation), several people
- Ibrahim al-Asiri (born 1981), a Saudi Arabian al-Qaeda bombmaker
- Turki Mash Awi Zayid Al Asiri, a Saudi Arabian who was held in extrajudicial detention at Guantanamo

== See also ==
- Ahmad Asiri (general)
