= Beriskan =

Beriskan بريسكان
- Village
- Location within Iran
- Coordinates: 28°43′36″N 54°17′03″E
- Country: Iran
- Province: Fars
- County: Darab
- Bakhsh: Central
- Rural District: Fasarud

Population (2006)
  - Total: 944
- Time zone: UTC+3:30 (IRST)
  - Summer (DST): UTC+4:30 (IRDT)

Beriskan (Persian: بريسكان, also Romanized as Berīskān; also known as Āb Bād) is a village in Fasarud Rural District, in the Central District of Darab County, Fars province, Iran. At the 2006 census, its population was 944, in 216 families.
