= Bisheh Zard, Fasa =

Bisheh Zard بیشه‌زرد
- Village
- Location within Iran
- Coordinates: 28°37′18″N 53°55′00″E
- Country: Iran
- Province: Fars
- County: Fasa
- Bakhsh: Shibkaveh
- Rural District: Miyan Deh

Population (2006)
  - Total: 410
- Time zone: UTC+3:30 (IRST)
  - Summer (DST): UTC+4:30 (IRDT)

Bisheh Zard (Persian: بیشه‌زرد, also Romanized as Bīsheh Zard) is a village in Miyan Deh Rural District, Shibkaveh District, Fasa County, Fars province, Iran. At the 2006 census, its population was 410, in 78 families.
