= Asir, Iran =

City in Fars province, Iran

Asir Persian: اسير
- City
- Location within Iran
- Coordinates: 27°43′27″N 52°39′46″E
- Country: Iran
- Province: Fars
- County: Mohr
- District: Asir

Population (2016)
  - Total: 3,042
- Time zone: UTC+3:30 (IRST)

Asir (Persian: اسير) (Note: Also romanized as Asīr; also known as Sīr) is a city in, and the capital of, Asir District of Mohr County, Fars province, Iran. It also serves as the administrative center for Asir Rural District.

== Demographics ==
=== Population ===
At the time of the 2006 National Census, Asir's population was 2,181 in 465 households, when it was a village in Asir Rural District. The following census in 2011 counted 2,180 people in 605 households, by which time the village had been elevated to the status of a city. The 2016 census measured the population of the city as 3,042 people in 865 households.
