= Shahrak-e Emam Khomeyni, Hormozgan =

Shahrak-e Emam Khomeyni شهرك امام خميني
- Village
- Location within Iran
- Coordinates: 26°43′21″N 54°53′36″E
- Country: Iran
- Province: Hormozgan
- County: Bandar Lengeh
- Bakhsh: Central
- Rural District: Howmeh

Population (2006)
  - Total: 183
- Time zone: UTC+3:30 (IRST)
  - Summer (DST): UTC+4:30 (IRDT)

Shahrak-e Emam Khomeyni (Persian: شهرك امام خميني, also romanized as Shahrak-e Emām Khomeynī) is a village in Howmeh Rural District, in the Central District of Bandar Lengeh County, Hormozgan Province, Iran. At the 2006 census, its population was 183, in 61 families.
