= Galleh Dar, Ilam =

Galleh Dar گله دار
- Village
- Location within Iran
- Coordinates: 33°15′45″N 47°09′40″E
- Country: Iran
- Province: Ilam
- County: Darreh Shahr
- Bakhsh: Badreh
- Rural District: Hendmini

Population (2006)
  - Total: 850
- Time zone: UTC+3:30 (IRST)
  - Summer (DST): UTC+4:30 (IRDT)

Galleh Dar (Persian: گله دار, also Romanized as Galleh Dār) is a village in Hendmini Rural District, Badreh District, Darreh Shahr County, Ilam Province, Iran. At the 2006 census, its population was 850, in 150 families. The people of this village speak Kurdish, specifically the Laki dialect.
