= Sar Chah-e Shur =

Sar Chah-e Shur سرچاه شور
- Village
- Location within Iran
- Coordinates: 32°13′00″N 58°54′19″E
- Country: Iran
- Province: South Khorasan
- County: Khusf
- Bakhsh: Jolgeh-e Mazhan
- Rural District: Qaleh Zari

Population (2006)
  - Total: 105
- Time zone: UTC+3:30 (IRST)
  - Summer (DST): UTC+4:30 (IRDT)

Sar Chah-e Shur (Persian: سرچاه شور, also Romanized as Sar Chāh-e Shūr, Sar Chah Shoor, Sar Chāh Shūr, and Sar-e Chāh Shūr) is a village in Qaleh Zari Rural District, Jolgeh-e Mazhan District, Khusf County, South Khorasan Province, Iran. At the 2006 census, its population was 105, in 27 families.
