= Band Bast, Hormozgan =

Band Bast بندبست
- Village
- Location within Iran
- Coordinates: 25°47′15″N 58°31′13″E
- Country: Iran
- Province: Hormozgan
- County: Jask
- Bakhsh: Central
- Rural District: Gabrik

Population (2006)
  - Total: 314
- Time zone: UTC+3:30 (IRST)
  - Summer (DST): UTC+4:30 (IRDT)

Band Bast (Persian: بندبست; also known as Banbast) is a village in Gabrik Rural District, in the Central District of Jask County, Hormozgan Province, Iran. At the 2006 census, its population was 314, in 77 families.
