= Ab Bidak-e Zilayi =

Ab Bidak-e Zilayi اب بيدك زيلائي
- Village
- Location within Iran
- Coordinates: 31°32′24″N 50°36′36″E
- Country: Iran
- Province: Kohgiluyeh and Boyer-Ahmad
- County: Boyer-Ahmad
- Bakhsh: Margown
- Rural District: Zilayi

Population (2006)
  - Total: 218
- Time zone: UTC+3:30 (IRST)
  - Summer (DST): UTC+4:30 (IRDT)

Ab Bidak-e Zilayi (Persian: اب بيدك زيلائي, also Romanized as Āb Bīdak-e Zīlāyī; also known as Āb Bīdak) is a village in Zilayi Rural District, Margown District, Boyer-Ahmad County, Kohgiluyeh and Boyer-Ahmad Province, Iran. At the 2006 census, its population was 218, in 43 families.
