= Nowabad, Dabuy-ye Jonubi =

Nowabad نواباد
- Village
- Location within Iran
- Coordinates: 36°34′53″N 52°25′34″E
- Country: Iran
- Province: Mazandaran
- County: Amol
- Bakhsh: Dabudasht
- Rural District: Mid Dabu

Population (2016)
  - Total: 122
- Time zone: UTC+3:30 (IRST)

Nowabad (Persian: نواباد, also Romanized as Nowābād) is a village in Dabudasht District of Amol County, Mazandaran Province, Iran.

At the time of the 2006 National Census, the village's population was 131 in 33 households, when it was in Dabuy-ye Jonubi Rural District. The following census in 2011 counted 122 people in 37 households. The 2016 census measured the population of the village as 122 people in 39 households, by which time it was transferred to Dabuy-ye Miyani Rural District.
