= Abad-e Chehel Tan =

Abad-e Chehel Tan ابادچهل تن
- Village
- Location within Iran
- Coordinates: 28°30′54″N 58°31′49″E
- Country: Iran
- Province: Kerman
- County: Narmashir
- Bakhsh: Rud Ab
- Rural District: Rud Ab-e Gharbi

Population (2006)
  - Total: 213
- Time zone: UTC+3:30 (IRST)
  - Summer (DST): UTC+4:30 (IRDT)

Abad-e Chehel Tan (Persian: ابادچهل تن, also Romanized as Ābād-e Chehel Tan and Ābād Chehel Tan; also known as Āb Bād-e Chehel Tan) is a village in Rud Ab-e Gharbi Rural District, Rud Ab District, Narmashir County, Kerman province, Iran. At the 2006 census, its population was 213, in 51 families.
