= Agi Band Bast =

Agi Band Bast آگي بند بست
- Village
- Location within Iran
- Coordinates: 25°43′14″N 58°54′13″E
- Country: Iran
- Province: Hormozgan
- County: Jask
- Bakhsh: Lirdaf
- Rural District: Piveshk

Population (2006)
  - Total: 102
- Time zone: UTC+3:30 (IRST)
  - Summer (DST): UTC+4:30 (IRDT)

Agi Band Bast (Persian: آگي بند بست, also Romanized as Āgī Band Bast; also known as Band Bast) is a village in Piveshk Rural District, Lirdaf District, Jask County, Hormozgan Province, Iran. At the 2006 census, its population was 102, in 27 families.
