= Galleh Dar =

City in Fars province, Iran

Galleh Dar Persian: گله‌دار
- City
- Location within Iran
- Coordinates: 27°39′28″N 52°39′34″E
- Country: Iran
- Province: Fars
- County: Mohr
- District: Galleh Dar

Population (2016)
  - Total: 13,448
- Time zone: UTC+3:30 (IRST)

Galleh Dar (Persian: گله‌دار) (Note: Also romanized as Galehdār and Galleh Dār; also known as Gilehdār and Kaleh Dār) is a city in, and the capital of, Galleh Dar District of Mohr County, Fars province, Iran. It also serves as the administrative center for Galleh Dar Rural District.

== Demographics ==
=== Population ===
At the time of the 2006 National Census, the city's population was 9,982 in 1,995 households. The following census in 2011 counted 11,354 people in 2,648 households. The 2016 census measured the population of the city as 13,448 people in 3,589 households.
