= Ab Bad-e Kaleb Ali Khani =

Ab Bad-e Kaleb Ali Khani اببادكلبعلي خاني
- Village
- Country: Iran
- Province: Kerman
- County: Baft
- Bakhsh: Central
- Rural District: Khabar

Population (2006)
  - Total: 56
- Time zone: UTC+3:30 (IRST)
  - Summer (DST): UTC+4:30 (IRDT)

Ab Bad-e Kaleb Ali Khani (Persian: اببادكلبعلي خاني, also Romanized as Āb Bād-e Kaleb ʿAlī Khānī) is a village in Khabar Rural District, in the Central District of Baft County, Kerman Province, Iran. At the 2006 census, its population was 56, in 12 families.
