= Shahrak-e Emam Khomeyni, Mazandaran =

Shahrak-e Emam Khomeyni شهرك امام خميني
- Village
- Location within Iran
- Coordinates: 36°28′00″N 52°13′00″E
- Country: Iran
- Province: Mazandaran
- County: Nur
- Bakhsh: Chamestan
- Rural District: Mianrud

Population (2006)
  - Total: 271
- Time zone: UTC+3:30 (IRST)
  - Summer (DST): UTC+4:30 (IRDT)

Shahrak-e Emam Khomeyni (Persian: شهرك امام خميني, also Romanized as Shahrak-e Emām Khomeynī) is a village in Mianrud Rural District, Chamestan District, Nur County, Mazandaran Province, Iran. At the 2006 census, its population was 271, in 63 families.
