= Nowabad, Dasht-e Sar =

Village in Mazandaran province, Iran

Nowabad Persian: نو آباد
- Village
- Location within Iran
- Coordinates: 36°24′34″N 52°24′31″E
- Country: Iran
- Province: Mazandaran
- County: Amol
- District: Dasht-e Sar
- Rural District: Dasht-e Sar-e Sharqi

Population (2016)
  - Total: 150
- Time zone: UTC+3:30 (IRST)

Nowabad (Persian: نو آباد) (Note: Also romanized as Nowābād) is a village in Dasht-e Sar-e Sharqi Rural District (Note: Formerly Dasht-e Sar Rural District) of Dasht-e Sar District in Amol County, Mazandaran province, Iran.

== Demographics ==
=== Population ===
At the time of the 2006 National Census, the village's population was 149 in 37 households, when it was in Dasht-e Sar Rural District (Note: Renamed Dasht-e Sar-e Sharqi Rural District) of Dabudasht District. The following census in 2011 counted 105 people in 30 households. The 2016 census measured the population of the village as 150 people in 48 households, by which time the rural district had been separated from the district in the formation of Dasht-e Sar District and renamed Dasht-e Sar-e Sharqi Rural District.
