= Galleh Dar Rural District =

Rural district in Fars province, Iran

Galleh Dar Rural District Persian: دهستان گله‌دار
- Rural District
- Location within Iran
- Coordinates: 27°37′33″N 52°38′10″E
- Country: Iran
- Province: Fars
- County: Mohr
- District: Galleh Dar
- Capital: Galleh Dar

Population (2016)
  - Total: 2,568
- Time zone: UTC+3:30 (IRST)

Galleh Dar Rural District (Persian: دهستان گله‌دار) is in Galleh Dar District of Mohr County, Fars province, Iran. It is administered from the city of Galleh Dar.

== Demographics ==
=== Population ===
At the time of the 2006 National Census, the rural district's population was 343 in 66 households. There were 2,124 inhabitants in 496 households at the following census of 2011. The 2016 census measured the population of the rural district as 2,568 in 685 households. The most populous of its four villages was Karun, with 1,109 people.
