= Ab Bad-e Qahremani =

Ab Bad-e Qahremani اببادقهرماني
- Village
- Location within Iran
- Coordinates: 28°49′36″N 56°15′45″E
- Country: Iran
- Province: Kerman
- County: Baft
- Bakhsh: Central
- Rural District: Khabar

Population (2006)
  - Total: 104
- Time zone: UTC+3:30 (IRST)
  - Summer (DST): UTC+4:30 (IRDT)

Ab Bad-e Qahremani (Persian: اببادقهرماني, also Romanized as Āb Bād-e Qahremānī; also known as Āb Yād-e Qahremānī) is a village in Khabar Rural District, in the Central District of Baft County, Kerman Province, Iran. At the 2006 census, its population was 104, in 21 families.
