= Fal Rural District =

Rural district in Fars province, Iran

Fal Rural District Persian: دهستان فال
- Rural District
- Location within Iran
- Coordinates: 27°37′17″N 52°42′45″E
- Country: Iran
- Province: Fars
- County: Mohr
- District: Galleh Dar
- Capital: Hajjiabad

Population (2016)
  - Total: 6,538
- Time zone: UTC+3:30 (IRST)

Fal Rural District (Persian: دهستان فال) is in Galleh Dar District of Mohr County, Fars province, Iran. Its capital is the village of Hajjiabad. The previous capital of the rural district was the village of Fal (now a city).

== Demographics ==
=== Population ===
At the time of the 2006 National Census, the rural district's population was 5,869 in 1,120 households. There were 6,514 inhabitants in 1,514 households at the following census of 2011. The 2016 census measured the population of the rural district as 6,538 in 1,692 households. The most populous of its seven villages was Fal (now a city), with 3,757 people.
