= Ab Bad-e Pedari =

Ab Bad-e Pedari اببادپدري
- Village
- Location within Iran
- Coordinates: 28°49′23″N 56°15′10″E
- Country: Iran
- Province: Kerman
- County: Baft
- Bakhsh: Central
- Rural District: Khabar

Population (2006)
  - Total: 12
- Time zone: UTC+3:30 (IRST)
  - Summer (DST): UTC+4:30 (IRDT)

Ab Bad-e Pedari (Persian: اببادپدري, also Romanized as Āb Bād-e Pedarī; also known as Āb Bād, Āb Bād-e Peders, and Āb Yād-e Badrī) is a village in Khabar Rural District, in the Central District of Baft County, Kerman Province, Iran. At the 2006 census, its population was 12, in 4 families.
