= Galleh Dar District =

District in Fars province, Iran

Galleh Dar District Persian: بخش گله‌دار
- District
- Location within Iran
- Coordinates: 27°37′17″N 52°40′50″E
- Country: Iran
- Province: Fars
- County: Mohr
- Capital: Galleh Dar

Population (2016)
  - Total: 22,554
- Time zone: UTC+3:30 (IRST)

Galleh Dar District (Persian: بخش گله‌دار) is in Mohr County, Fars province, Iran. Its capital is the city of Galleh Dar.

== History ==
After the 2016 National Census, the village of Fal was elevated to the status of a city.

== Demographics ==
=== Population ===
At the time of the 2006 census, the district's population was 16,194 in 3,181 households. The following census in 2011 counted 19,992 people in 4,658 households. The 2016 census measured the population of the district as 22,554 inhabitants in 5,966 households.

=== Administrative divisions ===
Galleh Dar District Population
Administrative Divisions	2006	2011	2016
Fal RD	5,869	6,514	6,538
Galleh Dar RD	343	2,124	2,568
Fal (city) (Note: Became a city after the 2016 census)			
Galleh Dar (city)	9,982	11,354	13,448
Total	16,194	19,992	22,554
RD = Rural District
