= Qotbabad Rural District =

Rural district in Fars province, Iran

Qotbabad Rural District Persian: دهستان قطب آباد
- Rural District
- Location within Iran
- Coordinates: 28°44′39″N 53°31′19″E
- Country: Iran
- Province: Fars
- County: Jahrom
- District: Kordian
- Capital: Qotbabad

Population (2016)
  - Total: 1,562
- Time zone: UTC+3:30 (IRST)

Qotbabad Rural District (Persian: دهستان قطب آباد) is in Kordian District of Jahrom County, Fars province, Iran. It is administered from the city of Qotbabad.

== Demographics ==
=== Population ===
At the time of the 2006 National Census, the rural district's population was 1,569 in 369 households. There were 1,395 inhabitants in 422 households at the following census of 2011. The 2016 census measured the population of the rural district as 1,562 in 522 households. The most populous of its 61 villages was Goldamcheh, with 548 people.
