= Alaviyeh Rural District =

Rural district in Fars province, Iran

Alaviyeh Rural District Persian: دهستان علويه
- Rural District
- Location within Iran
- Coordinates: 28°33′00″N 53°49′35″E
- Country: Iran
- Province: Fars
- County: Jahrom
- District: Kordian
- Capital: Baba Arab

Population (2016)
  - Total: 5,813
- Time zone: UTC+3:30 (IRST)

Alaviyeh Rural District (Persian: دهستان علويه) is in Kordian District of Jahrom County, Fars province, Iran. Its capital is the village of Baba Arab (Alaviyeh).

== Demographics ==
=== Population ===
At the time of the 2006 National Census, the rural district's population was 6,006 in 1,441 households. There were 5,542 inhabitants in 1,559 households at the following census of 2011. The 2016 census measured the population of the rural district as 5,813 in 1,914 households. The most populous of its 19 villages was Musaviyeh, (Note: Formerly Deh Zir) with 2,217 people.
