= Fathabad Rural District (Qir and Karzin County) =

Rural district in Fars province, Iran

Fathabad Rural District Persian: دهستان فتح آباد
- Rural District
- Location within Iran
- Coordinates: 28°27′28″N 53°00′23″E
- Country: Iran
- Province: Fars
- County: Qir and Karzin
- District: Central
- Capital: Karzin

Population (2016)
  - Total: 6,036
- Time zone: UTC+3:30 (IRST)

Fathabad Rural District (Persian: دهستان فتح آباد) is in the Central District of Qir and Karzin County, Fars province, Iran. It is administered from the city of Karzin. (Note: Formerly the city of Fathabad)

== Demographics ==
=== Population ===
At the time of the 2006 National Census, the rural district's population was 9,753 in 2,177 households. There were 5,142 inhabitants in 1,364 households at the following census of 2011. The 2016 census measured the population of the rural district as 6,036 in 1,751 households. The most populous of its 111 villages was Shahrak-e Aliabad, with 2,468 people.
