= Mobarakabad Rural District =

Rural district in Fars province, Iran

Mobarakabad Rural District Persian: دهستان مبارک‌آباد
- Rural District
- Location within Iran
- Coordinates: 28°21′23″N 53°19′37″E
- Country: Iran
- Province: Fars
- County: Qir and Karzin
- District: Central
- Capital: Mobarakabad

Population (2016)
  - Total: 4,244
- Time zone: UTC+3:30 (IRST)

Mobarakabad Rural District (Persian: دهستان مبارک‌آباد) is in the Central District of Qir and Karzin County, Fars province, Iran. It is administered from the city of Mobarakabad.

== Demographics ==
=== Population ===
At the time of the 2006 National Census, the rural district's population was 7,970 in 1,706 households. There were 4,395 inhabitants in 1,229 households at the following census of 2011. The 2016 census measured the population of the rural district as 4,244 in 1,249 households. The most populous of its 69 villages was Shahrak-e Qalat, with 1,032 people.
