= Hengam Rural District (Qir and Karzin County) =

Rural district in Fars province, Iran

Hengam Rural District Persian: دهستان هنگام
- Rural District
- Location within Iran
- Coordinates: 28°21′36″N 52°38′44″E
- Country: Iran
- Province: Fars
- County: Qir and Karzin
- District: Central
- Capital: Shahrak-e Hengam

Population (2016)
  - Total: 4,736
- Time zone: UTC+3:30 (IRST)

Hengam Rural District (Persian: دهستان هنگام) is in the Central District of Qir and Karzin County, Fars province, Iran. Its capital is the village of Shahrak-e Hengam.

== Demographics ==
=== Population ===
At the time of the 2006 National Census, the rural district's population was 4,877 in 1,024 households. There were 5,301 inhabitants in 1,371 households at the following census of 2011. The 2016 census measured the population of the rural district as 4,736 in 1,458 households. The most populous of its 45 villages was Shahrak-e Hengam, with 1,432 people.
