= Zakharuiyeh Rural District =

Rural district in Fars province, Iran

Zakharuiyeh Rural District Persian: دهستان زاخروئيه
- Rural District
- Location within Iran
- Coordinates: 28°12′34″N 52°50′26″E
- Country: Iran
- Province: Fars
- County: Qir and Karzin
- District: Efzar
- Capital: Mazraeh-ye Pahn

Population (2016)
  - Total: 4,095
- Time zone: UTC+3:30 (IRST)

Zakharuiyeh Rural District (Persian: دهستان زاخروئيه) is in Efzar District of Qir and Karzin County, Fars province, Iran. Its capital is the village of Mazraeh-ye Pahn.

== Demographics ==
=== Population ===
At the time of the 2006 National Census, the rural district's population was 3,104 in 655 households. There were 3,908 inhabitants in 992 households at the following census of 2011. The 2016 census measured the population of the rural district as 4,095 in 1,231 households. The most populous of its 38 villages was Mazraeh-ye Pahn, with 668 people.
