= Asir Rural District =

Rural district in Fars province, Iran

Asir Rural District Persian: دهستان اسير
- Rural District
- Location within Iran
- Coordinates: 27°42′34″N 52°38′40″E
- Country: Iran
- Province: Fars
- County: Mohr
- District: Asir
- Capital: Asir

Population (2016)
  - Total: 5,818
- Time zone: UTC+3:30 (IRST)

Asir Rural District (Persian: دهستان اسير) is in Asir District of Mohr County, Fars province, Iran. It is administered from the city of Asir.

== Demographics ==
=== Population ===
At the time of the 2006 National Census, the rural district's population was 8,553 in 1,758 households. There were 4,691 inhabitants in 1,114 households at the following census of 2011. The 2016 census measured the population of the rural district as 5,818 in 1,376 households. The most populous of its 24 villages was Chah Kabkan, with 2,150 people.
