= Kordian District =

District in Fars province, Iran

Kordian District Persian: بخش کردیان
- District
- Location within Iran
- Coordinates: 28°40′42″N 53°40′37″E
- Country: Iran
- Province: Fars
- County: Jahrom
- Capital: Qotbabad

Population (2016)
  - Total: 14,851
- Time zone: UTC+3:30 (IRST)

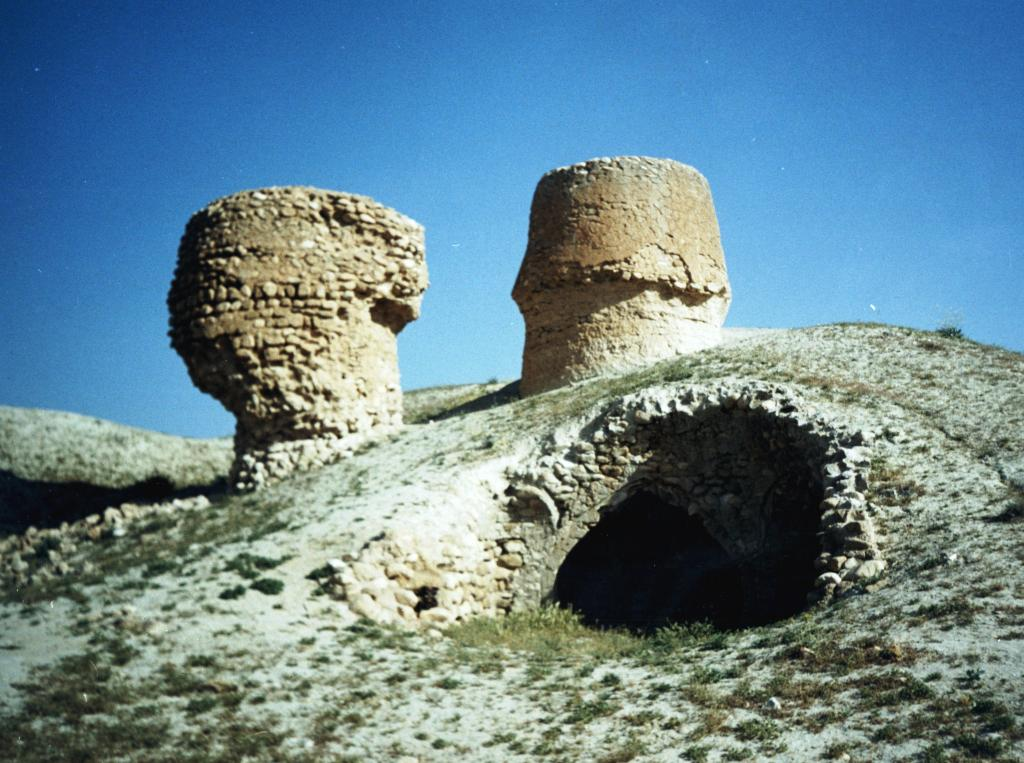

Kordian District (Persian: بخش کردیان) is in Jahrom County, Fars province, Iran. Its capital is the city of Qotbabad.

== Demographics ==
=== Population ===
At the time of the 2006 National Census, the district's population was 14,025 in 3,391 households. The following census in 2011 counted 13,691 people in 3,806 households. The 2016 census measured the population of the district as 14,851 inhabitants in 4,686 households.

=== Administrative divisions ===
Kordian District Population
| Administrative Divisions | 2006 | 2011 | 2016 |
|---|---|---|---|
| Alaviyeh RD | 6,006 | 5,542 | 5,813 |
| Qotbabad RD | 1,569 | 1,395 | 1,562 |
| Qotbabad (city) | 6,450 | 6,754 | 7,476 |
| Total | 14,025 | 13,691 | 14,851 |
RD = Rural District
