= Dasht-e Laleh Rural District =

Rural district in Fars province, Iran

Dasht-e Laleh Rural District Persian: دهستان دشت لاله
- Rural District
- Location within Iran
- Coordinates: 27°52′05″N 52°30′30″E
- Country: Iran
- Province: Fars
- County: Mohr
- District: Asir
- Capital: Shahrak-e Emam Khomeyni

Population (2016)
  - Total: 5,143
- Time zone: UTC+3:30 (IRST)

Dasht-e Laleh Rural District (Persian: دهستان دشت لاله) is in Asir District of Mohr County, Fars province, Iran. Its capital is the village of Shahrak-e Emam Khomeyni.

== Demographics ==
=== Population ===
At the time of the 2006 National Census, the rural district's population was 4,471 in 900 households. There were 4,324 inhabitants in 1,021 households at the following census of 2011. The 2016 census measured the population of the rural district as 5,143 in 1,364 households. The most populous of its 38 villages was Shahrak-e Emam Khomeyni, with 1,770 people.
