= Efzar Rural District =

Rural district in Fars province, Iran

Efzar Rural District Persian: دهستان افزر
- Rural District
- Location within Iran
- Coordinates: 28°21′15″N 52°58′06″E
- Country: Iran
- Province: Fars
- County: Qir and Karzin
- District: Efzar
- Capital: Shahrak-e Shomali

Population (2016)
  - Total: 8,172
- Time zone: UTC+3:30 (IRST)

Efzar Rural District (Persian: دهستان افزر) is in Efzar District of Qir and Karzin County, Fars province, Iran. Its capital is the village of Shahrak-e Shomali.

== Demographics ==
=== Population ===
At the time of the 2006 National Census, the rural district's population was 8,693 in 1,841 households. There were 7,871 inhabitants in 2,086 households at the following census of 2011. The 2016 census measured the population of the rural district as 8,172 in 2,413 households. The most populous of its 68 villages was Mozaffari, with 1,573 people.
