= Central District (Qir and Karzin County) =

District in Fars province, Iran

Central District (Qir and Karzin County) Persian: بخش مرکزی شهرستان قیر و کارزین
- District
- Location within Iran
- Coordinates: 28°27′28″N 52°59′01″E
- Country: Iran
- Province: Fars
- County: Qir and Karzin
- Capital: Qir

Population (2016)
  - Total: 54,377
- Time zone: UTC+3:30 (IRST)

The Central District of Qir and Karzin County (Persian: بخش مرکزی شهرستان قیر و کارزین) is in Fars province, Iran. Its capital is the city of Qir.

== History ==
After the 2006 National Census, the village of Shahrak-e Emam was elevated to the status of the city of Emam Shahr. The village of Mobarakabad rose to city status as well.

== Demographics ==
=== Population ===
At the time of the 2006 census, the district's population was 47,392 in 10,280 households. The following census in 2011 counted 50,747 people in 13,172 households. The 2016 census measured the population of the district as 54,377 inhabitants in 15,554 households.

=== Administrative divisions ===
Central District (Qir and Karzin County) Population
Administrative Divisions	2006	2011	2016
Fathabad RD	9,753	5,142	6,036
Hengam RD	4,877	5,301	4,736
Mobarakabad RD	7,970	4,395	4,244
Emam Shahr (city) (Note: Formerly the village of Shahrak-e Emam)		5,190	5,803
Karzin (city) (Note: Formerly the city of Fathabad)	7,953	8,446	8,841
Mobarakabad (city)		4,235	4,707
Qir (city)	16,839	18,038	20,010
Total	47,392	50,747	54,377
RD = Rural District
