= Asir District =

District in Fars province, Iran

Asir District Persian: بخش اسیر
- District
- Location within Iran
- Coordinates: 27°50′25″N 52°34′17″E
- Country: Iran
- Province: Fars
- County: Mohr
- Capital: Asir

Population (2016)
  - Total: 14,003
- Time zone: UTC+3:30 (IRST)

Asir District (Persian: بخش اسیر) is in Mohr County, Fars province, Iran. Its capital is the city of Asir.

== History ==
After the 2006 National Census, the village of Asir became a city.

== Demographics ==
=== Population ===
At the time of the 2006 census, the district's population was 13,024 in 2,658 households. The following census in 2011 counted 11,195 people in 2,740 households. The 2016 census measured the population of the district as 14,003 inhabitants in 3,605 households.

=== Administrative divisions ===
Asir District Population
Administrative Divisions	2006	2011	2016
Asir RD	8,553	4,691	5,818
Dasht-e Laleh RD	4,471	4,324	5,143
Asir (city)		2,180	3,042
Total	13,024	11,195	14,003
RD = Rural District
