= Efzar District =

District in Fars province, Iran

Efzar District Persian: بخش افزر
- District
- Location within Iran
- Coordinates: 28°15′59″N 52°53′06″E
- Country: Iran
- Province: Fars
- County: Qir and Karzin
- Capital: Efzar

Population (2016)
  - Total: 14,924
- Time zone: UTC+3:30 (IRST)

Efzar District (Persian: بخش افزر) is in Qir and Karzin County, Fars province, Iran. Its capital is the city of Efzar.

== Demographics ==
=== Population ===
At the time of the 2006 National Census, the district's population was 14,040 in 2,966 households. The following census in 2011 counted 14,117 people in 3,708 households. The 2016 census measured the population of the district as 14,924 inhabitants in 4,375 households.

=== Administrative divisions ===
Efzar District Population
Administrative Divisions	2006	2011	2016
Efzar RD	8,693	7,871	8,172
Zakharuiyeh RD	3,104	3,908	4,095
Efzar (city)	2,243	2,338	2,657
Total	14,040	14,117	14,924
RD = Rural District
