= Mohr County =

County in Fars province, Iran

Mohr County Persian: شهرستان مُهر
- County
- Location of Mohr County in Fars province (bottom left, purple)

- Location of Fars province in Iran
- Coordinates: 27°42′N 52°44′E
- Country: Iran
- Province: Fars
- Capital: Mohr
- Districts: Central, Asir, Galleh Dar, Varavi

Population (2016)
  - Total: 64,827
- Time zone: UTC+3:30 (IRST)

Mohr County (Persian: شهرستان مُهر) is in Fars province, Iran. Its capital is the city of Mohr.

== History ==
After the 2006 National Census, the village of Asir became a city. After the 2011 census, the village of Khuzi rose to the level of a city. After the 2016 census, the village of Fal was elevated to the status of a city.

== Demographics ==
=== Population ===
At the time of the 2006 census, the county's population was 54,094 in 10,999 households. The following census in 2011 counted 59,727 people in 14,083 households. The 2016 census measured the population of the county as 64,827 in 17,262 households.

=== Administrative divisions ===
Mohr County's population history and administrative structure over three consecutive censuses are shown in the following table.

Mohr County Population
Administrative Divisions	2006	2011	2016
Central District	13,265	15,213	15,386
Arudan RD	4,372	4,942	5,012
Mohr RD	2,705	2,448	2,590
Mohr (city)	6,188	7,823	7,784
Asir District	13,024	11,195	14,003
Asir RD	8,553	4,691	5,818
Dasht-e Laleh RD	4,471	4,324	5,143
Asir (city)		2,180	3,042
Galleh Dar District	16,194	19,992	22,554
Fal RD	5,869	6,514	6,538
Galleh Dar RD	343	2,124	2,568
Fal (city) (Note: Became a city after the 2016 census)			
Galleh Dar (city)	9,982	11,354	13,448
Varavi District	11,611	13,065	12,884
Khuzi RD	4,092	5,585	1,837
Varavi RD	3,463	3,509	3,180
Khuzi (city)			3,245
Varavi (city)	4,056	3,971	4,622
Total	54,094	59,727	64,827
RD = Rural District

== Climate ==
The climate is hot and dry.

== Economy ==
The county's main industries are based on its rich gas sources. Tabnak, Homa, Shanol, Varavi and Parsian refineries are important gas zones in this region.

== See also ==
Media related to Mohr County at Wikimedia Commons
