= Qir and Karzin County =

County in Fars province, Iran

Qir and Karzin County Persian: شهرستان قیر و کارزین
- County
- Location of Qir and Karzin County in Fars province (bottom left, green)

- Location of Fars province in Iran
- Coordinates: 28°19′40″N 52°58′55″E
- Country: Iran
- Province: Fars
- Capital: Qir
- Districts: Central, Efzar

Population (2016)
  - Total: 71,203
- Time zone: UTC+3:30 (IRST)

Qir and Karzin County (Persian: شهرستان قیر و کارزین) (Note: Also romanized as Shahrestan Qir va Karzin) is located in Fars province, Iran. Its capital is the city of Qir.

== History ==
After the 2006 National Census, the village of Shahrak-e Emam was elevated to the status of the city of Emam Shahr. The village of Mobarakabad rose to city status as well.

== Demographics ==
=== Population ===
At the time of the 2006 census, the county's population was 61,432, in 13,246 households. The following census in 2011 counted 65,045 people, in 16,906 households. The 2016 census measured the population of the county as 71,203, in 20,508 households.

=== Administrative divisions ===
Qir and Karzin County's population history and administrative structure over three consecutive censuses are shown in the following table.

Qir and Karzin County Population
Administrative Divisions	2006	2011	2016
Central District	47,392	50,747	54,377
Fathabad RD	9,753	5,142	6,036
Hengam RD	4,877	5,301	4,736
Mobarakabad RD	7,970	4,395	4,244
Emam Shahr (city) (Note: Formerly the village of Shahrak-e Emam)		5,190	5,803
Karzin (city) (Note: Formerly the city of Fathabad)	7,953	8,446	8,841
Mobarakabad (city)		4,235	4,707
Qir (city)	16,839	18,038	20,010
Efzar District	14,040	14,117	14,924
Efzar RD	8,693	7,871	8,172
Zakharuiyeh RD	3,104	3,908	4,095
Efzar (city)	2,243	2,338	2,657
Total	61,432	65,045	71,203
RD = Rural District

== See also ==
Media related to Qir and Karzin County at Wikimedia Commons
