= Mir Maleki =

Mir Maleki ميرملكي
- Village
- Location within Iran
- Coordinates: 27°27′54″N 53°04′44″E
- Country: Iran
- Province: Fars
- County: Mohr
- Bakhsh: Varavi
- Rural District: Varavi

Population (2006)
  - Total: 798
- Time zone: UTC+3:30 (IRST)
  - Summer (DST): UTC+4:30 (IRDT)

Mir Maleki (Persian: ميرملكي, also Romanized as Mīr Malekī) is a village in Varavi Rural District, Varavi District, Mohr County, Fars province, Iran. At the 2006 census, its population was 798, in 152 families.
