= Toll-e Mallu =

Toll-e Mallu تل ملو
- Village
- Location within Iran
- Coordinates: 27°24′36″N 53°01′28″E
- Country: Iran
- Province: Fars
- County: Mohr
- Bakhsh: Varavi
- Rural District: Khuzi

Population (2006)
  - Total: 61
- Time zone: UTC+3:30 (IRST)
  - Summer (DST): UTC+4:30 (IRDT)

Toll-e Mallu (Persian: تل ملو, also Romanized as Toll-e Mallū; also known as Tol-e Mallū-ye Pā’īn and Tūleh-ye Mallū) is a village in Khuzi Rural District, Varavi District, Mohr County, Fars province, Iran. At the 2006 census, its population was 61, in 13 families.
