= Gudarzi =

Gudarzi گودرزي
- Village
- Location within Iran
- Coordinates: 27°25′19″N 52°58′32″E
- Country: Iran
- Province: Fars
- County: Mohr
- Bakhsh: Varavi
- Rural District: Khuzi

Population (2006)
  - Total: 22
- Time zone: UTC+3:30 (IRST)
  - Summer (DST): UTC+4:30 (IRDT)

Gudarzi (Persian: گودرزي, also Romanized as Gūdarzī, Goodarzi, and Gowdarzī; also known as Gowd-e Razī and Manţaqeh-ye Gowdarzī) is a village in Khuzi Rural District, Varavi District, Mohr County, Fars province, Iran. At the 2006 census, its population was 22, in 6 families.
