= Tall-e Mollai =

Tall-e Mollai تل ملايي
- Village
- Location within Iran
- Coordinates: 27°25′38″N 53°09′53″E
- Country: Iran
- Province: Fars
- County: Mohr
- Bakhsh: Varavi
- Rural District: Varavi

Population (2006)
  - Total: 38
- Time zone: UTC+3:30 (IRST)

Tall-e Mollai (Persian: تل ملايي, also Romanized as Tall-e Mollā’ī and Toll-e Mollā’ī; also known as Qoll-e Mollā’ī) is a village in Varavi Rural District, Varavi District, Mohr County, Fars province, Iran. At the 2006 census, its population was 38, in 9 families.
