= Chah Sharaf =

Chah Sharaf چاه شرف
- Village
- Location within Iran
- Coordinates: 27°26′56″N 53°08′10″E
- Country: Iran
- Province: Fars
- County: Mohr
- Bakhsh: Varavi
- Rural District: Varavi

Population (2006)
  - Total: 919
- Time zone: UTC+3:30 (IRST)
  - Summer (DST): UTC+4:30 (IRDT)

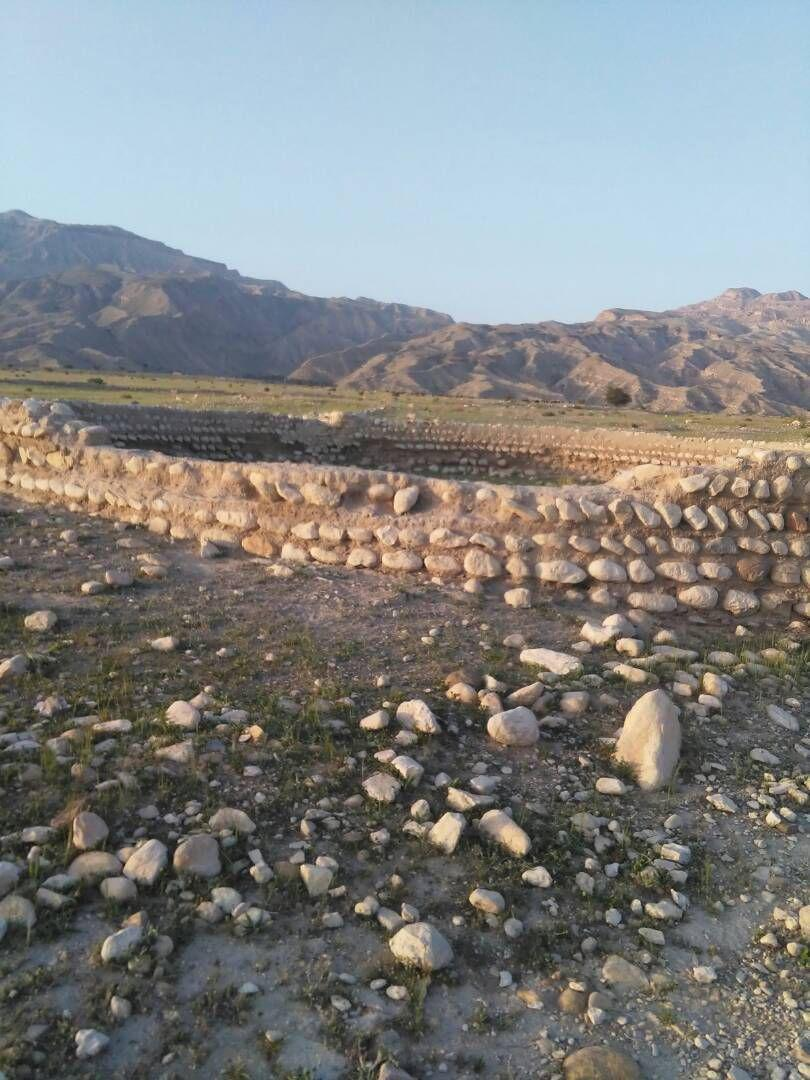
Sarooji pool in Chah Sharaf

Chah Sharaf (Persian: چاه شرف, also Romanized as Chāh Sharaf and Chāh-e Sharaf) is a village in Varavi Rural District, Varavi District, Mohr County, Fars province, Iran. At the 2006 census, its population was 919, in 217 families.
