= Nerman, Iran =

Village in Fars province, Iran

Nerman Persian: نرمان
- Village
- Location within Iran
- Coordinates: 27°30′04″N 53°00′47″E
- Country: Iran
- Province: Fars
- County: Mohr
- District: Varavi
- Rural District: Varavi

Population (2016)
  - Total: 926
- Time zone: UTC+3:30 (IRST)

Nerman (Persian: نرمان) (Note: Also romanized as Nermān) is a village in Varavi Rural District of Varavi District, Mohr County, Fars province, Iran.

== Demographics ==
=== Population ===
At the time of the 2006 National Census, the village's population was 1,071 in 215 households. The following census in 2011 counted 1,077 people in 268 households. The 2016 census measured the population of the village as 926 people in 259 households. It was the most populous village in its rural district.
