= Chah Gazi, Mohr =

Chah Gazi چاه گزي
- Village
- Location within Iran
- Coordinates: 27°23′40″N 53°02′34″E
- Country: Iran
- Province: Fars
- County: Mohr
- Bakhsh: Varavi
- Rural District: Khuzi

Population (2006)
  - Total: 498
- Time zone: UTC+3:30 (IRST)
  - Summer (DST): UTC+4:30 (IRDT)

Chah Gazi (Persian: چاه گزي, also Romanized as Chāh Gazī and Chāh-e Gazī) is a village in Khuzi Rural District, Varavi District, Mohr County, Fars province, Iran. At the 2006 census, its population was 498, in 101 families.
