= Nurabad, Mohr =

Village in Fars province, Iran

Nurabad Persian: نوراباد
- Village
- Location within Iran
- Coordinates: 27°24′30″N 53°00′24″E
- Country: Iran
- Province: Fars
- County: Mohr
- District: Varavi
- Rural District: Khuzi

Population (2016)
  - Total: 1,187
- Time zone: UTC+3:30 (IRST)

Nurabad (Persian: نوراباد) (Note: Also romanized as Noor Abad and Nūrābād) is a village in Khuzi Rural District of Varavi District, Mohr County, Fars province, Iran.

== Demographics ==
=== Population ===
At the time of the 2006 National Census, the village's population was 1,064 in 231 households. The following census in 2011 counted 1,049 people in 266 households. The 2016 census measured the population of the village as 1,187 people in 339 households. It was the most populous village in its rural district.
