= Chah Gazi =

Chah Gazi or Chah-e Gazi (Persian: چاه گزي) may refer to:

- Chah Gazi, Lamerd
- Chah Gazi, Mohr
