= Salman Farsi University of Kazerun =

University in Iran

Coordinates: 29.6277038°N 51.6629653°E

- دانشگاه سلمان فارسی کازرون; Dāneshgāh-e-Salmān-e-Fārsi-e Kāzerun
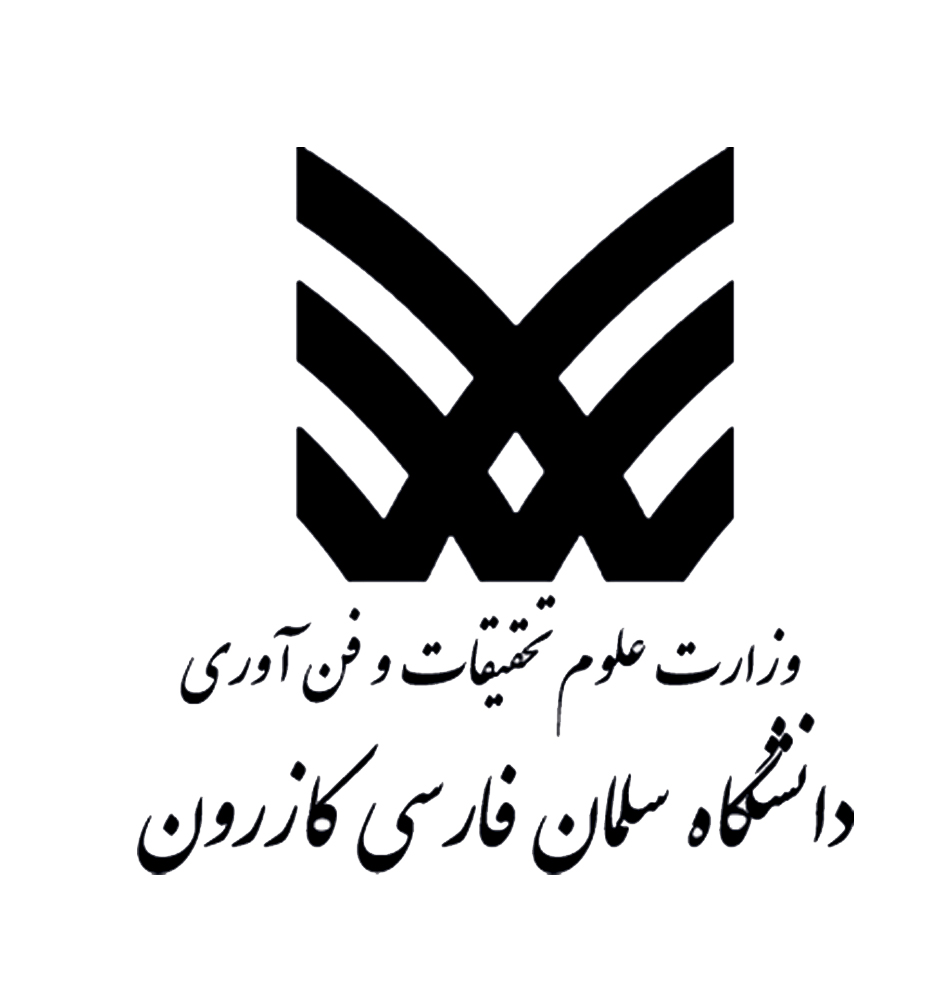
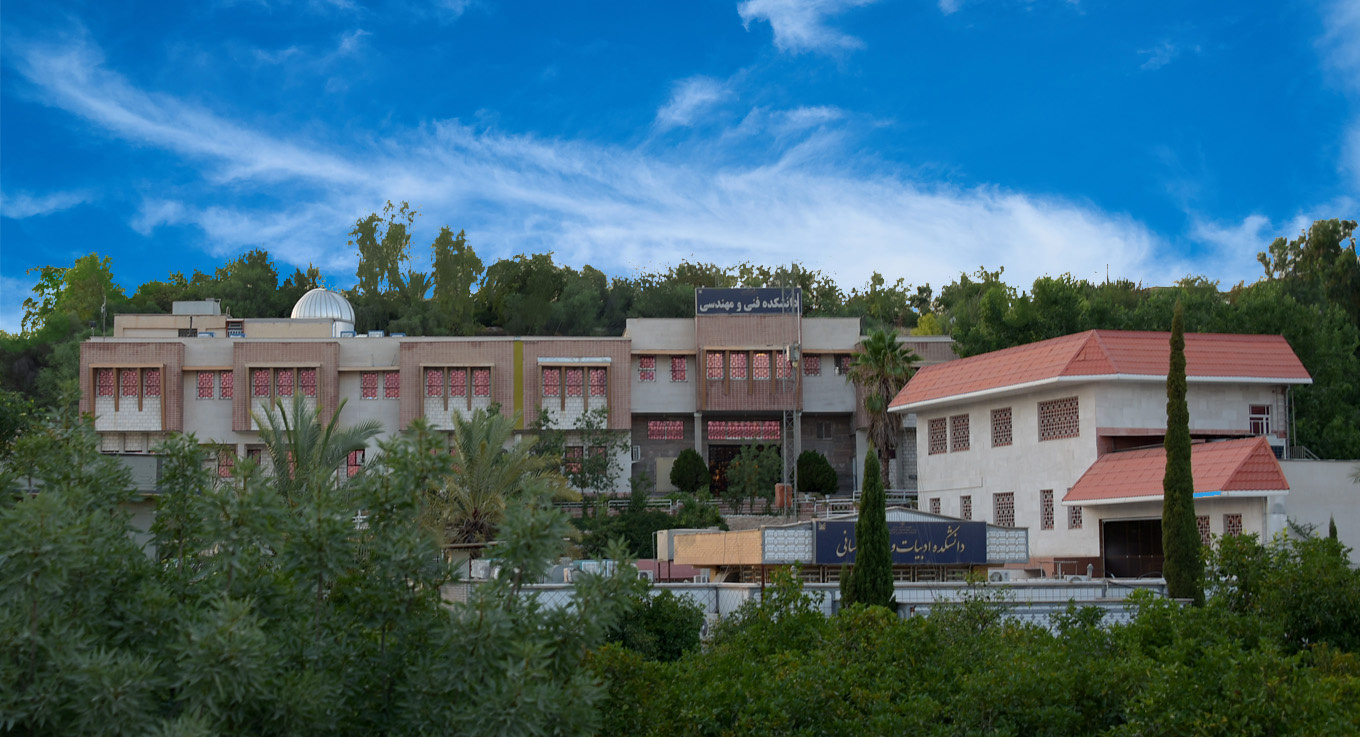
- Motto: کازرون، دیار افتخارات ماندگار ایران
- Motto in English: Kazerun, the Land of Lasting Honors of Iran
- Type: Public
- Established: 1993
- Chancellor: Dr. Yahya Gordani
- Faculty: 70
- Students: around 2000
- Location: Kazerun, Fars, Iran
- Campus: Urban
- Website: www.kazerunsfu.ac.ir

Salman Farsi University of Kazerun (Persian: دانشگاه سلمان فارسی کازرون Dāneshgāh-e-Salmān-e-Fārsi-e Kāzerun) is a public university located in Kazerun, Iran, established in 1993. This university is affiliated to the Ministry of Science, Research and Technology. Salman Farsi University is known as the western scientific pole of Fars province.

== History ==
In 1993, the Faculty of Teacher Training of Kazerun was established in this city, and after 10 years of operation in 2003, it was promoted to the Higher Education Center of Kazerun. In 2010, this educational center was upgraded to Kazerun University Complex. On December 10, 2011, this complex was upgraded to Salman Farsi University of Kazerun by the approval of the Board of Ministers.

=== Name ===
At the suggestion of the officials of that time and considering that the city of Kazerun was the birthplace of Salman the Persian (romanized: Salmān-e-Fārsi), Companions the Prophet of Islam, this university was named after him.

== Students and Graduates ==
Currently, more than 2000 students are studying in Salman Farsi University of Kazerun. So far, more than 2,500 people have graduated from this university.

== Faculties and Fields of study ==
Salman Farsi University of Kazerun has three faculties of Humanities, Basic Sciences and Technical and Engineering.

=== Faculty of Humanities ===
This faculty has three Academic department, including English language, Psychology, and Persian language and literature, and includes the following fields of study:

Educational stage	Field	Academic department
PhD	Persian language and literature – Pure	Persian language and literature
Master	Persian language and literature – Pure	Persian language and literature
Master	Persian language and literature – Writing and Editing	Persian language and literature
Master	Psychology	Psychology
Master	Teaching English language	English language
Bachelor	English language	English language
Bachelor	Psychology	Psychology
Bachelor	Persian language and literature	Persian language and literature

=== Faculty of Basic Sciences ===
This faculty has two Academic department including Mathematics and Computer science and Physics and Engineering physics and includes the following fields of study:

Educational stage	Field	Academic department
Bachelor	Computer science	Mathematics and Computer science
Bachelor	Physics	Physics and Engineering physics
Bachelor	Engineering science	Physics and Engineering physics
Bachelor	Engineering physics	Physics and Engineering physics
Bachelor	Applied mathematics	Mathematics and Computer science

=== Faculty of Technical and Engineering ===
This faculty has three Academic department including Computer engineering, Electrical engineering and Urban engineering and includes the following fields of study:

Educational stage	Field	Academic department
Bachelor	Urban engineering	Urban engineering
Bachelor	Information Technology engineering	Computer engineering
Bachelor	Electronic technology engineering	Electrical engineering
Bachelor	Electrical engineering	Electrical engineering
Bachelor	Optical engineering	Electrical engineering

== Research institutes and Scientific centers ==
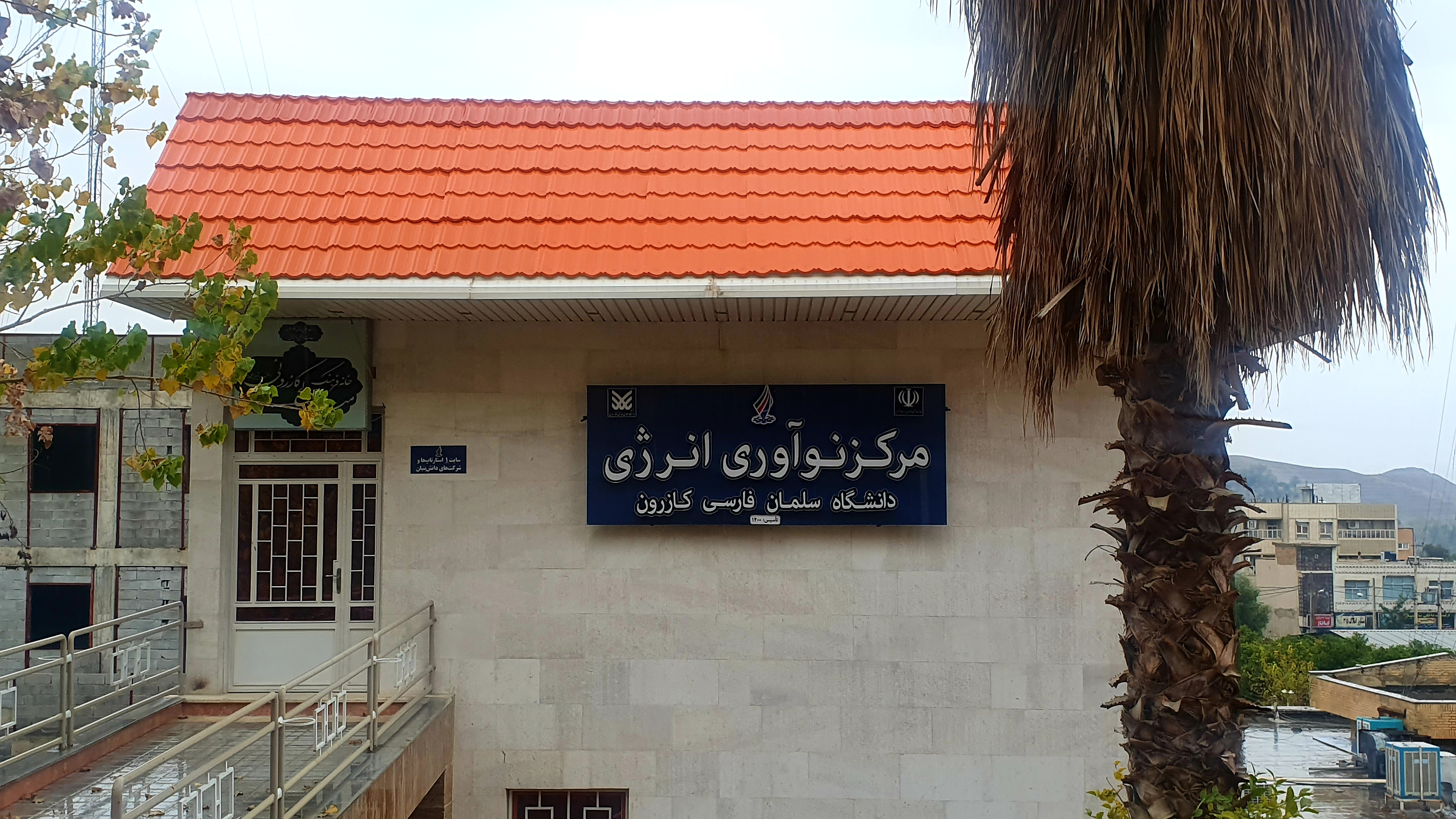
Energy Innovation Center of Salman Farsi University of Kazerun, The second Energy Innovation Center in Iran

Salman Farsi University of Kazerun has various Research institutes and Scientific and Innovation centers, and Knowledge enterprise operate in these centers.

Name	Location	Stablishment year
Observatory	Central building	2011
Kazerun Incubator of Technology units	Central building	2022
Energy Innovation Center	Central building	2021
Artificial intelligence Center	Central building	2022
Statistics, Data mining and Data science consulting center	Central building	2023
Computing and Complexity Research Group	University campus	
Nanotechnology Research Institute	University campus	
Center for Cultural and Social Studies	University campus	2021
Free and virtual education center		
Entrepreneurship and industry relations group		
Language learning center		

== Forums and Publications ==
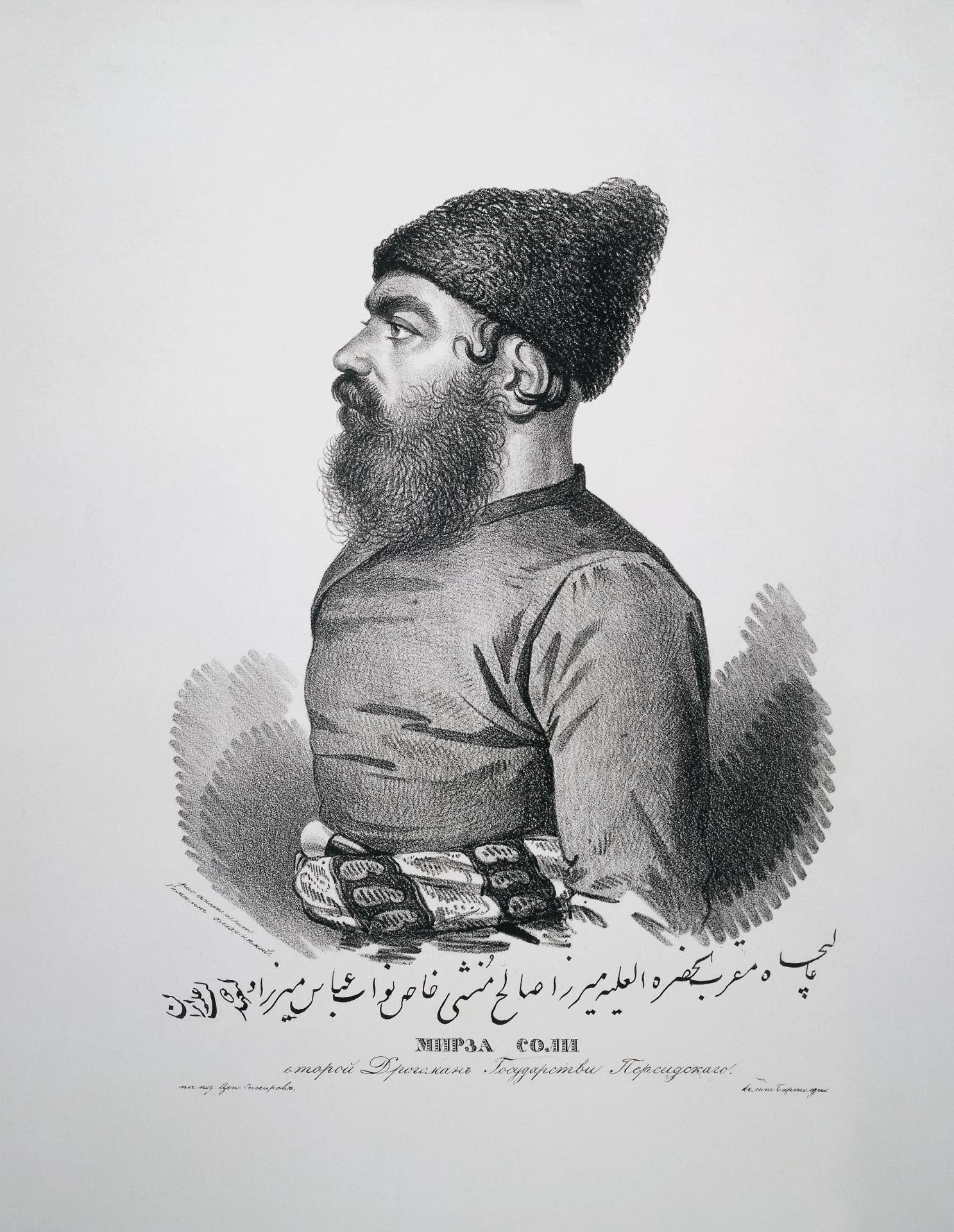
Mirza Saleh Kazeruni, The publisher of the first newspaper in Iran and the first Iranian educated in Europe

Mirza Saleh Kazeruni Culture House is the place of activities of Scientific associations, Cultural centers, Organizations and Student publications of Salman Farsi University of Kazerun, which is located in the central building of this university. The official newsletter of the university describes the news of the university and related matters.

List of associations and centers that have a dedicated publication

Name of the Association or Center	Name of the Publication
Persian Language and Literature Student Scientific Association	Darug
Information Technology Engineering Student Scientific Association	Farāyand (Process)
Psychology Student Scientific Association	Rowzaneh (Aperture)
Physics Student Scientific Association	Manshour (Prism)
Applied Mathematics Student Scientific Association	Algorithm
Urban Engineering Student Scientific Association	Ārmān-Shār
Electrical Engineering Student Scientific Association	Pulse
Astronomy Student Scientific Association	Fazāy-e-Bikarān (Infinite space)
Robotics Student Scientific Association	Mechatronics
Scientific Student Association of Engineering Science	Mokaab-Mostatil (Rectangular cuboid)
English Language Teaching Student Scientific Association	View Point
Computer Science Student Scientific Association	Sefr-o-Yek (Zero and One)
The Student Basij	Javaneh (Bud)
The Islamic Organization of Pen and Thought	Sobh-e-Ghalam (Pen's Morning)
The center of Quran and Etrat	Thaqalayn
Center for Mental health helpers	Āvāy-e-Moshāver (Adviser's voice)
Tourism and Iran Tour Center	Tafarroj (Outing)
Juibar Literary Center	Juibar (Rivulet)
Film and Photo Center	Suzheh (Subject)
Independent Student Center	Āyāydon

List of other centers

Kazerun Studies Center
Environment Center (Green oak)
Pulse of Life Student Charity Center
Peace Center
Theater Center
Eighth Note Music Center

== Center Library ==
Ayatollah Imani Library of Salman Farsi University of Kazerun started working in 1993 and now it has a collection of over 29,000 printed books, 90 publications and 2 databases.

== Campus of Salman Farsi University ==
The operation of building the campus of Salman Farsi University of Kazerun started in the 2000s in an area of 87 hectares in the west of Kazerun and adjacent to Payam Noor University of Kazerun with the aim of developing the physical space of the university. This project was put into operation in 2022. So far, the buildings of the Faculty of Basic Sciences and Central Self-Service, as well as the Artificial turf Field, have been put into operation in this campus. Other big projects such as the building of Classrooms, the new building of the Technical and Engineering faculty, the Dormitory, the Student bazaar and the Academicians housing, along with the completion of landscaping and other projects, are under construction.

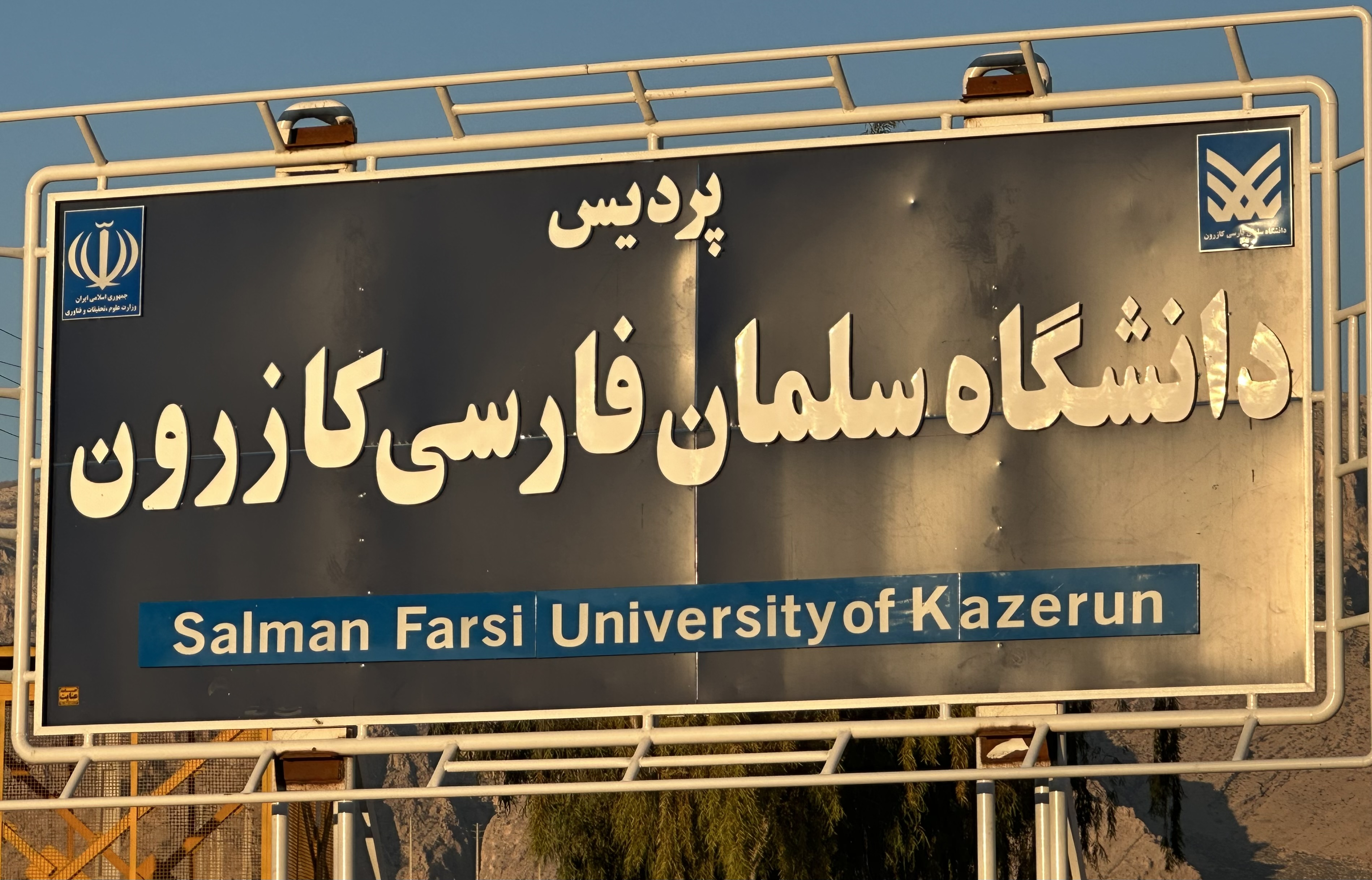

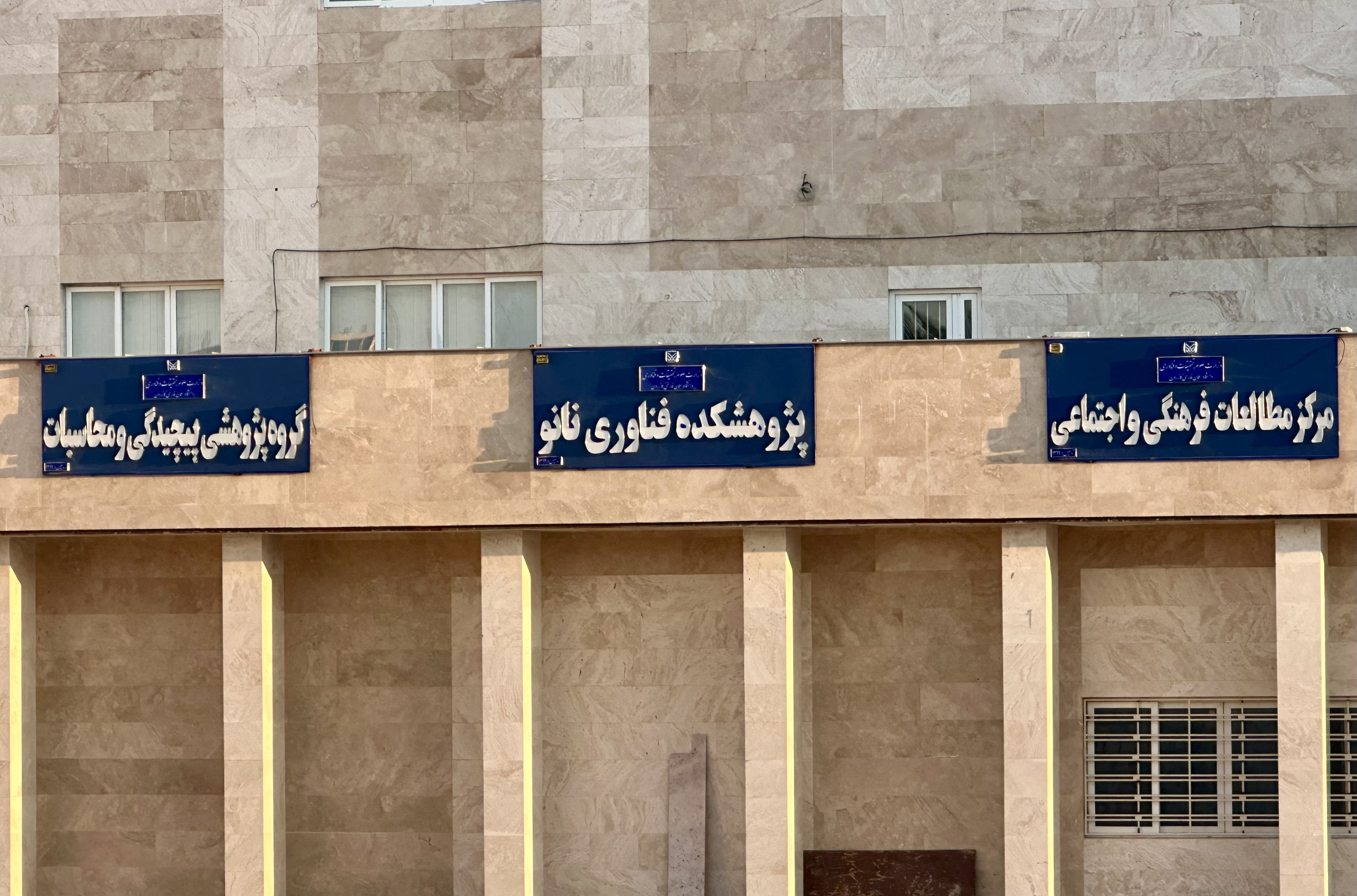
Scientific and Research Centers on the University Campus

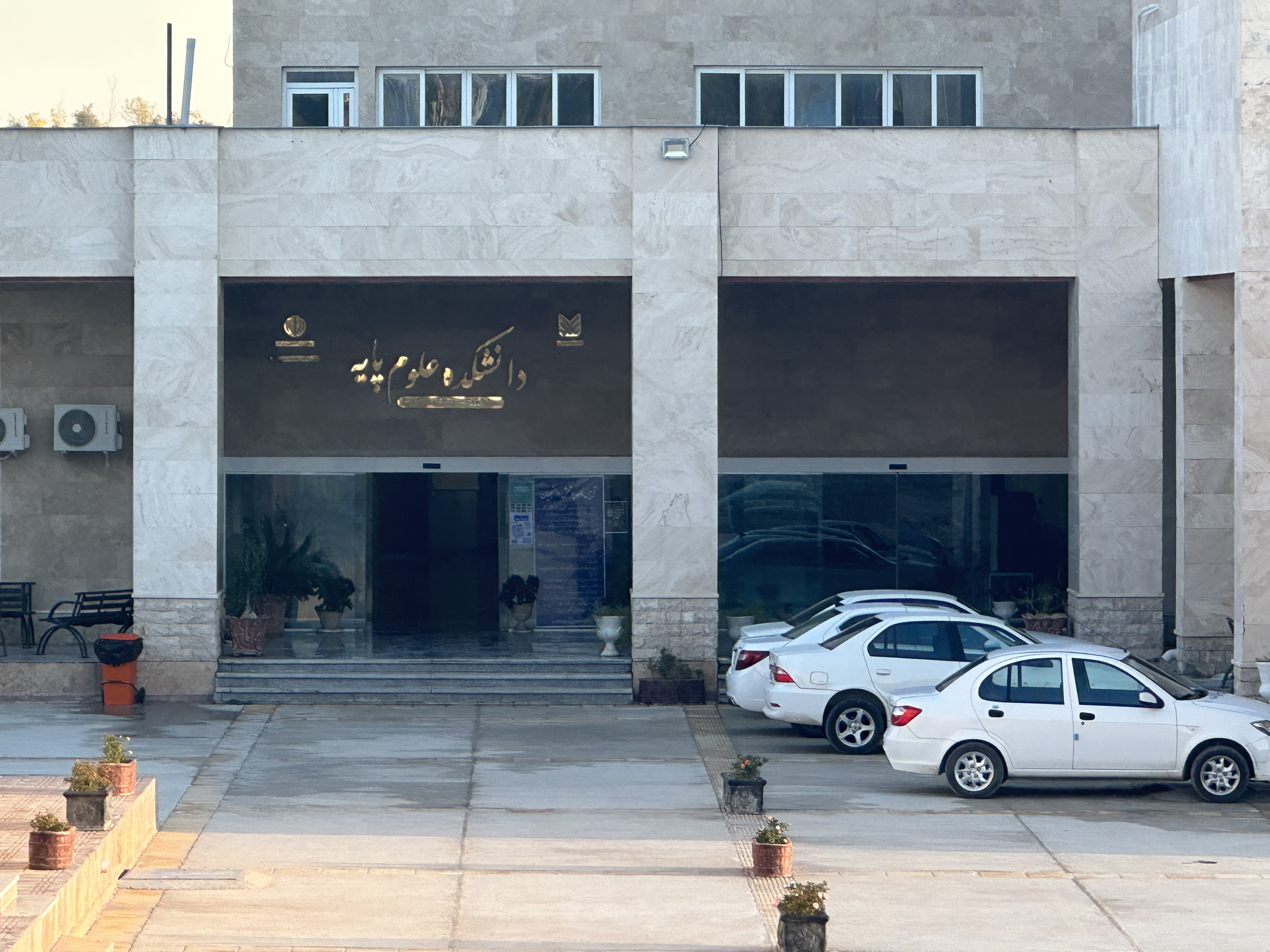
Faculty of Basic Sciences

== Supporters Foundation of Salman Farsi University of Kazerun ==
The Foundation of Supporters of Salman Farsi University of Kazerun was established in 2022 by a group of professors and elites of Kazerun. Famous founders of this foundation include Fereydoon Abbasi, Reza Malekzadeh, Mohammad Hossein Rajabi Davani, Mohammad Aref and Mohammad Javad Dehghani. Among the famous members of the board of trustees of this foundation, we can mention Emaduddin Sheikh Al-Hokamaei and Hossein Bonyadi. In this regard, in 2023, Ali Mohammad Moazzeni, a professor of Tehran University from Kazerun, donated his personal library to Salman Farsi University. Also, Fereydoun Mahboodi, another elite of Kazerun and a member of the faculty of Pasteur Institute of Iran, is building a large dormitory in the campus of Salman Farsi University in Kazerun. Also in 2022, Ali Hossein Sazmand, the director of Danje publishing house from Kazerun, was associated with this foundation by donating 116 book volumes.

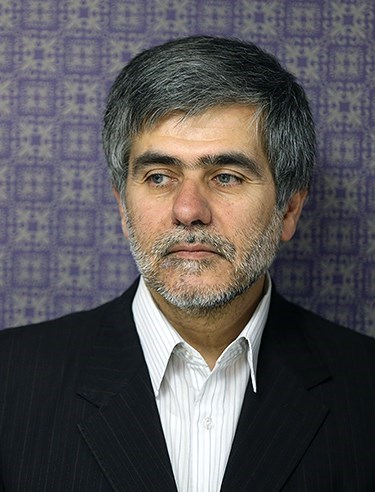
Dr. Fereydoon Abbasi: Former head of the Atomic Energy Organization and Former Vice President

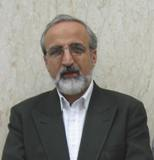
Dr. Reza Malekzadeh: Former Minister of Health and Medical Education

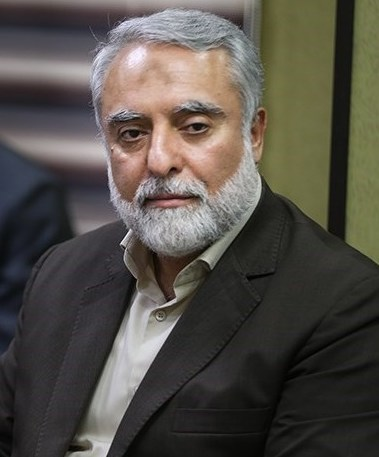
Dr. Mohammad Hossein Rajabi Davani: head of Iranology Foundation

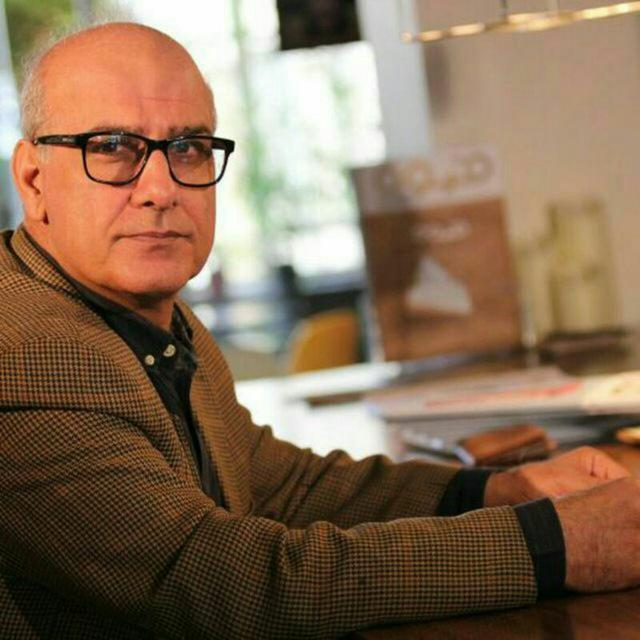
Dr. Mohammad Aref: Prominent Iranian researcher

== Memorandums of Understanding ==
Some of the memorandums of understanding of Salman Farsi University of Kazerun with other universities and institutions are:

- Memorandum of cooperation with Fars province Science Park
- Memorandum of cooperation with Shiraz University
- Memorandum of cooperation with Shiraz University of Medical Sciences
- Memorandum of cooperation with Persian Gulf University
- Memorandum of cooperation with Kazerun Municipality
- Memorandum of cooperation with Academic Center for Education, Culture and Research of Fars province
- Memorandum of cooperation with Foundation of Martyrs and Veterans Affairs
- Memorandum of cooperation with Research Institute of Humanities and Cultural Studies
- Memorandum of cooperation with Islamic World Science Citation Database
- Memorandum of cooperation with General Department of Culture and Islamic Guidance of Fars province
- Memorandum of cooperation with Rang Science and Technology Research Institute of the Ministry of Science, Research and Technology
- Memorandum of cooperation with Institute of advanced materials and new energies (IROST)
- Memorandum of cooperation with Shahid Dr. Peyravian incubator
- Memorandum of cooperation with Iranian Manuscripts Research Scientific Association

== Presidents and Faculty members ==
Dr. Yahya Gordani is the current president of Salman Farsi University of Kazerun. This university currently has 70 faculty members.

The list of presidents of Salman Farsi University of Kazerun since its inception

Name	Presidency	
Name	Beginning	End
Dr. Reza Pooladi	September 1993	June 2005
Dr. Mohtasham Mohammadi	June 2005	August 2006
Dr. Farhad Khormaei	August 2006	March 2013
Dr. Reza Pooladi	March 2013	September 2015
Dr. Farhad Barati	September 2015	August 2018
Dr. Anushiravan Ghaffari-Pour	August 2018	June 2020
Dr. Gharib Fazel-Nia	June 2020	September 2023
Dr. Alireza Farsi-Nezhad	September 2023	June 2025
Dr. Yahya Gordani	June 2025	so far

== See also ==
- Education in Iran
- Higher education in Iran

== Resources ==
- Salman Farsi University of Kazerun (Persian Wikipedia)
- Official website of Salman Farsi University of Kazerun
- Linkedin
- Nature Index
- Edu Rank
- AD Scientific Index
- Academia Edu
- Higher Education Letter – Comparing the Intelligence of Students According to Gender and Field of Study in Salman Farsi University of Kazerun
- African Research Nexus
