= Fasa University of Medical Sciences =

University in Fasa

- دانشگاه علوم پزشکی و خدمات بهداشتی درمانی فسا
- Established: 1977
- Chancellor: Dr. Mehdi Rezaeian
- Administrative staff: 93
- Students: 1,200
- Location: Fasa, Iran
- Website: fums.ac.ir

Fasa University of Medical Sciences (Persian: دانشگاه علوم پزشکی و خدمات بهداشتی درمانی فسا) is a public university in Fasa, Iran. The university has four faculties including medicine, health care, nursing, and paramedicine.

== Hospitals ==
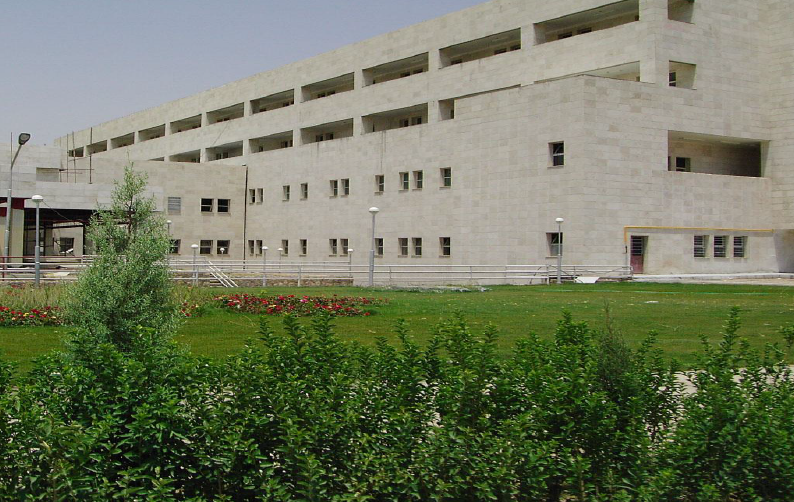
Vali-e-Asr Hospital

=== Vali-e-Asr Hospital ===
Vali-e-Asr Hospital is an educational and therapeutic hospital located in Fasa, southern Fars Province, under the supervision of Fasa University of Medical Sciences. The design of the hospital was carried out in 1990 by the Ministry of Housing and Urban Development. Groundbreaking took place in 1996, and after some time, the project was transferred from the Ministry of Health to Shiraz University of Medical Sciences. With the efforts of the then-president of Fasa University of Medical Sciences, Mehrdad Afarid, the project which had remained incomplete due to financial shortages and frequent changes in management and had reached only 40% progress by 2005 was finally entrusted to Fasa University of Medical Sciences. Through his efforts, it was inaugurated in 2007 with an expenditure of 130 billion rials, on land covering 69 hectares with a building area of 24,000 square meters.

Vali-e-Asr Hospital, with 251 approved and 322 active beds, includes departments of cardiology, internal medicine, pediatrics, surgery, obstetrics and gynecology, emergency, laboratory, radiology, physiotherapy, angiography, ultrasonography, CT scan, CCU, ICU, lithotripsy, and various specialized and subspecialty clinics.

=== Dr. Ali Shariati Hospital ===
Dr. Shariati Hospital is an educational and therapeutic hospital in the city of Fasa, Fars Province, affiliated with Fasa University of Medical Sciences. It was established in 1973 with a capacity of 25 active beds, and it currently operates with 144 active beds.

The existing inpatient wards of this hospital include infectious diseases, neurology, psychiatry, emergency, and oncology.

=== Imam Hossein Hospital ===
Imam Hossein Hospital is an educational and therapeutic hospital in Fasa, eastern Fars Province, under the supervision of Fasa University of Medical Sciences, with a capacity of 184 beds. Construction of this hospital began in 2010 on a site with a building area of 16,000 square meters across four floors. It was inaugurated in 2023 with construction and equipment costs totaling 10 trillion rials.

=== Vali-e-Asr Cancer Screening Center ===
This center, built on an area of 1,000 square meters with an expenditure of more than 15 billion rials, is located within Vali-e-Asr Hospital in Fasa. It is equipped with mammography, endoscopy, ultrasonography, and colonoscopy devices. In addition to Fasa, residents of eastern Fars Province can benefit from its services. Breast, skin, stomach, colorectal, bladder, and prostate cancers are among the most common in Fasa; however, with the improved equipment of this center, more effective steps can be taken in diagnosing and preventing these diseases.
