= Iradj Fazel =

Iranian surgeon and academic

- ایرج فاضل
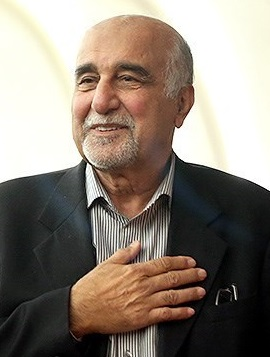

Minister of Health
- In office 29 August 1989 – 13 January 1991
- President: Ali Akbar Rafsanjani
- Preceded by: Alireza Marandi
- Succeeded by: Reza Malekzadeh

Minister of Science
- In office 20 August 1984 – 28 October 1985
- President: Ali Khamenei
- Prime Minister: Mir-Hossein Mousavi
- Preceded by: Mohammad-Ali Najafi
- Succeeded by: Mohammad Farhadi

Personal details
- Born: 1939 Ardestan, Iran

Iradj Fazel (Persian: ایرج فاضل, romanized: Īraj Fāżel; born 24 April 1939) is a prominent Iranian surgeon and academic. He was the president of the Iranian Academy of Medical Sciences for 19 years, until 2010. In the aftermath of the 2009 Iranian presidential election, he wrote a public letter, protesting the way Iranian youth were being treated. Subsequently, he was removed as the president of the Iranian Academy of Medical Sciences by President Ahmadinejad.

Fazel studied medicine at University of Tehran and pursued his studies in the United States. He specialized in organ transplantation.

Fazel is a full professor at the medical school of National University of Iran (then Shahid Beheshti University). He is a former minister of health and medical education and president of the Iranian Society of Surgeons.

Fazel graduated from Tehran Medical School in 1964. He is a diplomate of the American Board of Surgery and professor of surgery at Shahid Beheshti University of Medical Sciences in Tehran, Iran. He is a founding member of Iranian Association of Surgeons and its current president, and president of the Iranian Society for Organ Transplantation. He served as the minister of Higher Education in 1985 and the minister of Health and Medical Education in 1989. He also served two terms as the president of Iran Medical Council in 1991-1996 and 2017-2019.

== Representative publications ==
- Malakoutian, T; Hakemi, MS; Nassiri, AA; Rambod, M; Haghighi, AN; Broumand, B; Fazel, I (2007). "Socioeconomic status of Iranian living unrelated kidney donors: a multicenter study". Transplantation Proceedings. 39 (4): 824–5. doi:10.1016/j.transproceed.2007.04.018. PMID 17524823.
- Fazel, I; Pourshams, A; Merat, S; Hemayati, R; Sotoudeh, M; Malekzadeh, R (2007). "Modified jejunoileal bypass surgery with biliary diversion for morbid obesity and changes in liver histology during follow-up". Journal of Gastrointestinal Surgery. 11 (8): 1033–8. doi:10.1007/s11605-007-0184-1. PMID 17514410. S2CID 23473126.
