= Mehrdad Afarid =

Iranian ophthalmologist

- مهرداد آفرید
- Born: Shiraz, Iran
- Occupations: Ophthalmologist, academic
- Known for: Vitreoretinal surgery
- Title: Professor of Ophthalmology

Academic background
- Education: MD; Fellowship in Vitreoretinal Surgery
- Alma mater: Shiraz University of Medical Sciences

Academic work
- Institutions: Shiraz University of Medical Sciences; Fasa University of Medical Sciences
- Notable works: Ocular Manifestations of Rheumatologic Disorders (2015)

Mehrdad Afarid (In Persian language: مهرداد آفرید) is an Iranian ophthalmologist and academic who teaches at Shiraz University of Medical Sciences (SUMS). He previously served as the president of Fasa University of Medical Sciences. His clinical focus is on retinal and vitreous diseases.

== Early life and education ==
Afarid was born in Shiraz, Iran. He attended Towhid High School and later studied medicine at Shiraz University of Medical Sciences. He completed both his ophthalmology residency and a fellowship in vitreoretinal surgery at the same institution. In 1993, he was ranked first in Iran's national Chemistry Olympiad.

== Academic and administrative career ==
Afarid has held academic appointments at Shiraz University of Medical Sciences and served in several administrative roles. While at Fasa University of Medical Sciences, he was involved in expanding academic programs and developing campus infrastructure. During his tenure as President of Fasa University of Medical Sciences, the institution became an independent university and opened a 220-bed teaching hospital.

== Clinical work ==
In 2017, Afarid participated in a team at SUMS that performed an artificial retina implant procedure, one of the first of its kind in Iran. The surgery aimed to restore limited visual function in patients with severe retinal disorders using a sensor linked to a camera system.

== Research and publications ==
Afarid has published articles on topics including retinal disease, inflammation, nanotechnology applications in ophthalmology, and biologic therapies. In 2015, he authored a Persian-language textbook titled Ocular Manifestations of Rheumatologic Disorders (ISBN 9786006884271). His research profiles are available on academic platforms such as Google Scholar and ResearchGate.

== Selected publications ==
- Afarid, M., Bahari, H., & Sanie-Jahromi, F. (2023). In vitro evaluation of apoptosis, inflammation, angiogenesis, and neuroprotection gene expression in retinal pigmented epithelial cells treated with interferon α-2b. Journal of Interferon & Cytokine Research, 43(7), 299–306.
- Afarid, M., Mahmoodi, S., & Baghban, R. (2022). Recent achievements in nano-based technologies for ocular disease diagnosis and treatment: Review and update. Journal of Nanobiotechnology, 20(1), 361.
- Afarid, M., Meshksar, A., Salehi, A., & Safarpour, M. M. (2020). Evaluation of the effect of topical interferon α2b as a complementary treatment of macular edema of patients with diabetic retinopathy: A double-blind placebo-controlled randomized clinical trial. Retina, 40(5), 936–942.
- Afarid, M., Namvar, E., & Sanie-Jahromi, F. (2020). Diabetic retinopathy and BDNF: A review on its molecular basis and clinical applications. Journal of Ophthalmology, 2020(1), 1602739.
- Afarid, M., Torabi-Nami, M., & Zare, B. (2016). Neuroprotective and restorative effects of brain-derived neurotrophic factor in retinal diseases. Journal of the Neurological Sciences, 363, 43–50.

== See also ==
- Shiraz University of Medical Sciences
- Vitreoretinal surgery
- Artificial retina
