= Chah Gazi, Lamerd =

Chah Gazi چاه گزي
- Village
- Location within Iran
- Coordinates: 27°40′32″N 52°55′33″E
- Country: Iran
- Province: Fars
- County: Lamerd
- Bakhsh: Alamarvdasht
- Rural District: Alamarvdasht

Population (2006)
  - Total: 273
- Time zone: UTC+3:30 (IRST)
  - Summer (DST): UTC+4:30 (IRDT)

Chah Gazi (Persian: چاه گزي, also Romanized as Chāh Gazī and Chāh-e Gazī) is a village in Alamarvdasht Rural District, Alamarvdasht District, Lamerd County, Fars province, Iran. At the 2006 census, its population was 273, in 58 families.
