= Iranian Academy of Medical Sciences =

The Academy of Medical Sciences of Iran (Persian: فرهنگستان علوم پزشکی جمهوری اسلامی ایران) was formally inaugurated in 1990. It had received its mandate from the High Council of Cultural Revolution and Legislature of the Islamic Republic of Iran two years earlier and its existence had been foreseen in the 1986 Charter of the Ministry of Health and Medical Education. It is one of the four academies of the Islamic Republic of Iran.

== Organization ==
The Academy consists of the president of the country as the director of the academy, a general assembly, the president of the academy (currently Iradj Fazel), a vice-president for research (currently Reza Malekzadeh), a scientific council, and a secretary. The Academy publishes Archives of Iranian Medicine, a peer-reviewed medical journal.

== Objectives ==
Among the major objectives of The Academy of Medical Sciences of Iran are the development of medical sciences and techniques as well as reinforcement of the spirit of research, the attainment of scientific and cultural independence, promotion of the level of the national medical sciences, attainment of the latest findings and, innovation in the field of medical science through collective endeavors and encouragement of scientists and researchers.

== Members ==
The Academy has three types of members including Permanent, Associate and Honorary.

== See also ==
- Healthcare in Iran
- Higher education in Iran
- Science and technology in Iran
