= Shiraz University of Arts =

University of Arts in Iran

- دانشگاه هنر شیراز
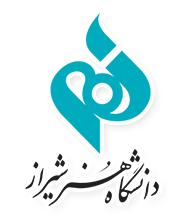
- Type: Public
- Established: 2010
- Chancellor: Sattar Khaledian
- Location: Shiraz, Fars, Iran; 29°37′29.6″N 52°33′32.84″E
- Campus: Urban
- Website: http://shirazartu.ac.ir

Shiraz University of Arts (Persian: دانشگاه هنر شيراز) is the fourth university of arts in Iran and the first in the southern part of the country.

== Majors ==
- Carpet
- Monument Restoration
- Museum Management
- Interior Architecture
- Archaeology
- Theatrical Literature
- Painting
