= Khuzi =

City in Fars province, Iran

Khuzi Persian: خوزی
- City
- Location within Iran
- Coordinates: 27°26′50″N 52°58′17″E
- Country: Iran
- Province: Fars
- County: Mohr
- District: Varavi

Population (2016)
  - Total: 3,245
- Time zone: UTC+3:30 (IRST)

Khuzi (Persian: خوزی) (Note: Also romanized as Khūzī; also known as Hūzi) is a city in Varavi District of Mohr County, Fars province, Iran, serving as the administrative center for Khuzi Rural District.

== Demographics ==
=== Population ===
At the time of the 2006 National Census, Khuzi's population was 2,277 in 481 households, when it was a village in Khuzi Rural District. The following census in 2011 counted 3,646 people in 798 households. The 2016 census measured the population as 3,245 people in 723 households, by which time the village had been elevated to the status of a city.
