= Varavi =

City in Fars province, Iran

Varavi Persian: وراوی
- City
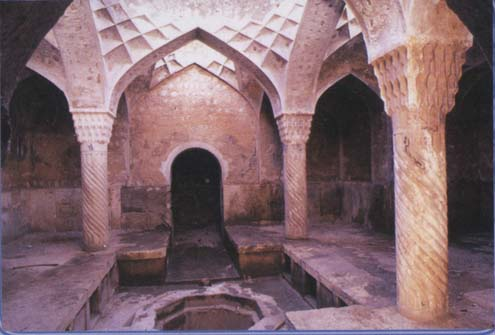
- A bathhouse in Varavi, Iran

- Location within Iran
- Coordinates: 27°27′56″N 53°03′09″E
- Country: Iran
- Province: Fars
- County: Mohr
- District: Varavi

Population (2016)
  - Total: 4,622
- Time zone: UTC+3:30 (IRST)

Varavi (Persian: وراوی) (Note: Also romanized as Varāvī, Vorāvī, Waravi, and Warāwi) is a city in, and the capital of, Varavi District of Mohr County, Fars province, Iran. It also serves as the administrative center for Varavi Rural District.

== Demographics ==
=== Population ===
At the time of the 2006 National Census, the city's population was 4,056 in 847 households. The following census in 2011 counted 3,971 people in 1,007 households. The 2016 census measured the population of the city as 4,622 people in 1,302 households.
