= Reza Malekzadeh =

Iranian medical scientist and gastroenterologist

- رضا ملک‌زاده
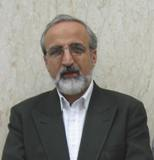
- Malekzadeh in 2006

Minister of Health and Medical Education
- In office 5 March 1991 – 16 August 1993; Acting: 14 January – 5 March 1991
- President: Akbar Hashemi Rafsanjani
- Preceded by: Iradj Fazel
- Succeeded by: Alireza Marandi

Personal details
- Born: 16 January 1952 (age 74) Baladeh, Kazerun County, Fars Province, Iran
- Party: Executives of Construction Party
- Education: Shiraz University of Medical Sciences

Reza Malekzadeh (Persian: رضا ملک‌زاده; born 1952 in Kazerun, Fars Province, Iran) is an Iranian researcher, in medical fields and a gastroenterologist.

== Career ==
Malekzadeh pursued education at Shiraz University. He advanced his training by specializing in Internal Medicine at the university, where he also completed his fellowship in gastroenterology. In 1985 he became part of the gastroenterology department at Free Royal Hospital in London. Upon returning to Iran he secured a faculty role at Shiraz University. Subsequently, at Tehran University of Medical Sciences. where he is currently a full professor of internal medicine. He is also an Honorary Professor at University of Birmingham, UK.

Reza Malekzadeh served as the Minister of Health in Irans government between 1991 and 1993. Between 2000 and 2004 Malekzadeh held the position of secretary at the Iranian Academy of Medical Sciences . From 2005 onward he has been the academys vice-president for research. He leads the Digestive Disease Research Center . Was named director of Shariati Hospital , in 2007. Dr Malekzadeh is also the Deputy-Editor of Archives of Iranian Medicine .

He is conducting research on a cancer cohort in Bandar-Turkeman, Golestan Province of Iran to examine the environmental and hereditary factors responsible, for oesophageal cancer.

== Achievements ==
In addition to his fame as a gastroenterologist Professor Malekzadeh has played a role in developing and implementing an effective and feasible method for detecting cancerous and non-cancerous esophageal lesions across Iran suitable for both urban and rural settings. He became a TWAS member, in 2004.

Reza Malekzadeh was honored with the "Permanent Personages Award" during the Third Permanent Personages session on October 22, 2003. This prestigious national accolade is bestowed upon Irans exceptional and notable citizens. He has a list of respected scientific articles, in gastroenterology and liver diseases. Dr Malekzadeh was named a professor at Tehran University of Medical Sciences in 2008.

== Views ==
Amid the COVID-19 pandemic in Iran, Supreme Leader Ali Khamenei alongside Hossein Salami proposed that the coronavirus outbreak, in the nation resulted from a biological attack. On 13 March Reza Malekzadeh dismissed this hypothesis.

== Family life ==
Dr Malekzadeh was born in Baladeh village located in Fars. Reza Malekzadeh has been married for 31 years. Has four children: three daughters and one son. Three of them pursued studies like him while one is studying architecture. He continues to visit Baladeh and plays a significant role, in philanthropic efforts there.

== Memberships ==
- Member of the International Association for Study of the Liver (IASL)
- Member of the American Gastroenterology Association (AGA)
- Member of the European Association for Gastroenterology & Endoscopy (EAGE)
- Member of the American Society for Gastrointestinal Endoscopy (ASGE)
- Secretary of the Iranian Society of Gastroenterology and Hepatology
- Member of the Iranian Society of Physicians
- Counsellor of the Iranian Board of Internal Medicine
- Permanent Member of the Iranian Academy of Medical Sciences
- Member of the American Association for Advancement of Science (AAAS)

== See also ==
- Iranian science
- Iranian Academy of Medical Sciences
