= Khuzi Rural District =

Rural district in Fars province, Iran

Khuzi Rural District Persian: دهستان خوزی
- Rural District
- Location within Iran
- Coordinates: 27°25′39″N 52°58′32″E
- Country: Iran
- Province: Fars
- County: Mohr
- District: Varavi
- Capital: Khuzi

Population (2016)
  - Total: 1,837
- Time zone: UTC+3:30 (IRST)

Khuzi Rural District (Persian: دهستان خوزی) is in Varavi District of Mohr County, Fars province, Iran. It is administered from the city of Khuzi.

== Demographics ==
=== Population ===
At the time of the 2006 National Census, the rural district's population was 4,092 in 859 households. There were 5,585 inhabitants in 1,252 households at the following census of 2011. The 2016 census measured the population of the rural district as 1,837 in 523 households. The most populous of its 11 villages was Nurabad, with 1,187 people.
