= Varavi Rural District =

Rural district in Fars province, Iran

Varavi Rural District Persian: دهستان وراوی
- Rural District
- Location within Iran
- Coordinates: 27°29′10″N 53°05′08″E
- Country: Iran
- Province: Fars
- County: Mohr
- District: Varavi
- Capital: Varavi

Population (2016)
  - Total: 3,180
- Time zone: UTC+3:30 (IRST)

Varavi Rural District (Persian: دهستان وراوی) is in Varavi District of Mohr County, Fars province, Iran. It is administered from the city of Varavi.

== Demographics ==
=== Population ===
At the time of the 2006 National Census, the rural district's population was 3,463 in 716 households. There were 3,509 inhabitants in 832 households at the following census of 2011. The 2016 census measured the population of the rural district as 3,180 in 866 households. The most populous of its five villages was Nerman, with 926 people.
