= Varavi District =

District in Fars province, Iran

Varavi District Persian: بخش وراوی
- District
- Location within Iran
- Coordinates: 27°26′51″N 53°02′07″E
- Country: Iran
- Province: Fars
- County: Mohr
- Capital: Varavi

Population (2016)
  - Total: 12,884
- Time zone: UTC+3:30 (IRST)

Varavi District (Persian: بخش وراوی) is in Mohr County, Fars province, Iran. Its capital is the city of Varavi.

== History ==
After the 2011 National Census, the village of Khuzi was elevated to the status of a city.

== Demographics ==
=== Population ===
At the time of the 2006 census, the district's population was 11,611 in 2,422 households. The following census in 2011 counted 13,065 people in 3,091 households. The 2016 census measured the population of the district as 12,884 inhabitants in 3,414 households.

=== Administrative divisions ===
Varavi District Population
Administrative Divisions	2006	2011	2016
Khuzi RD	4,092	5,585	1,837
Varavi RD	3,463	3,509	3,180
Khuzi (city)			3,245
Varavi (city)	4,056	3,971	4,622
Total	11,611	13,065	12,884
RD = Rural District
