= Fars province =

Province of Iran

Fars استان فارس (Persian)
- Province
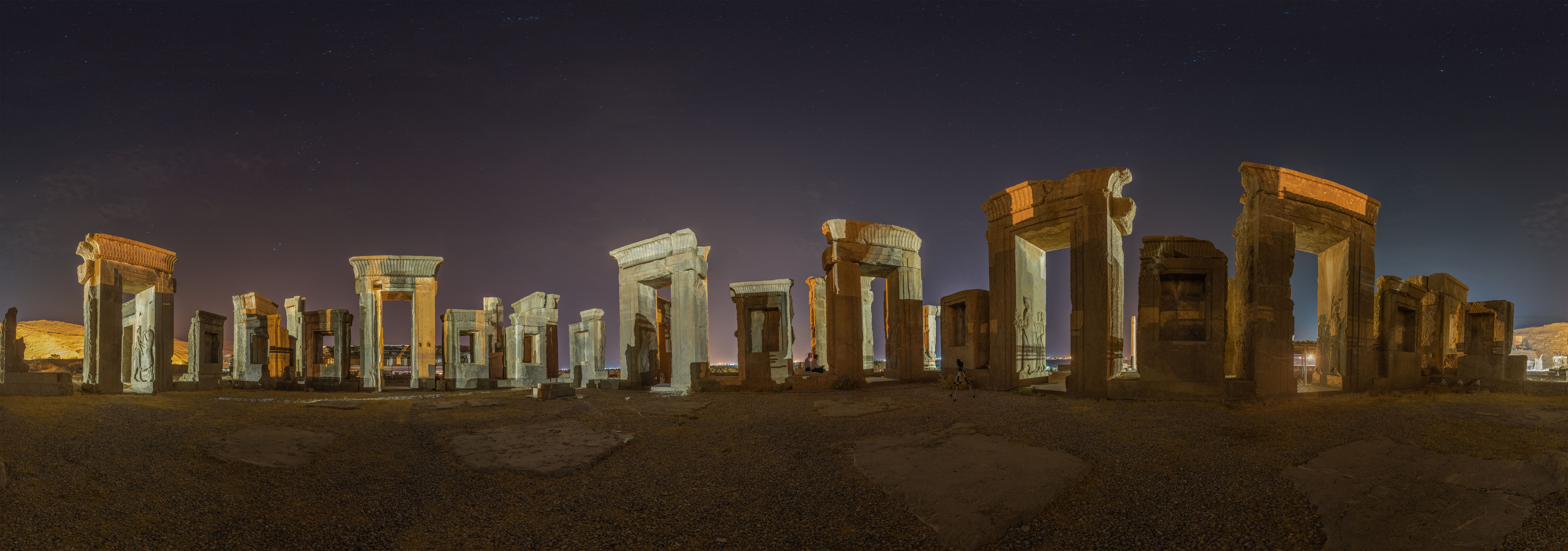
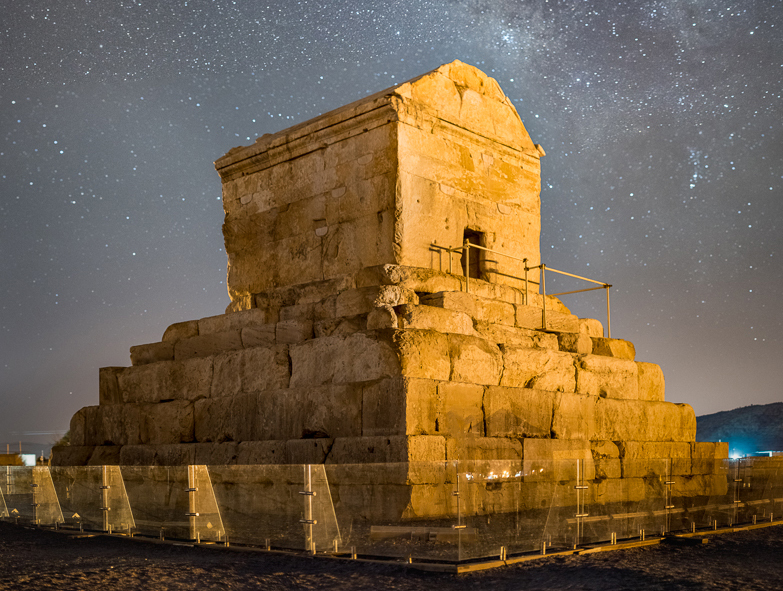
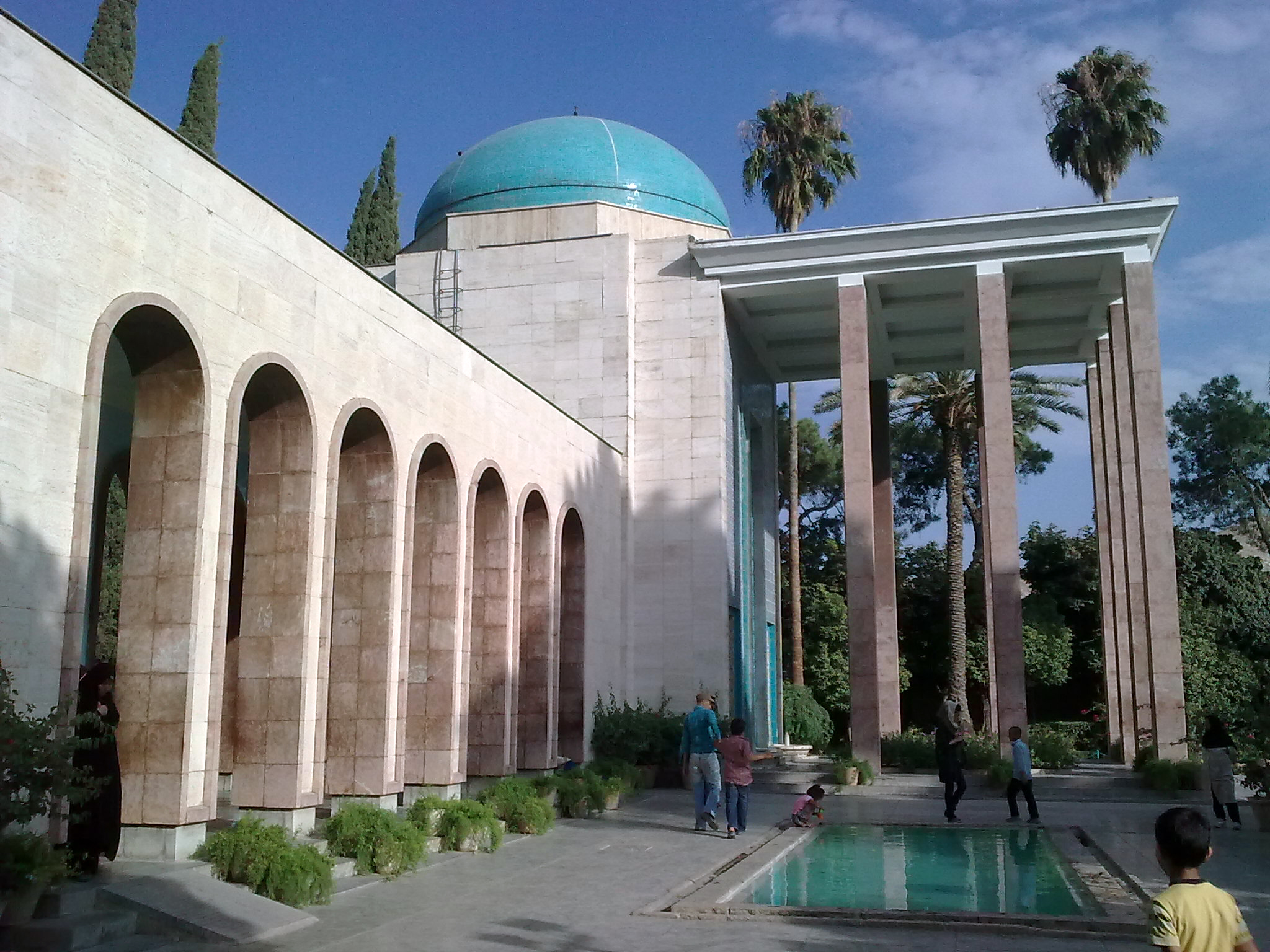
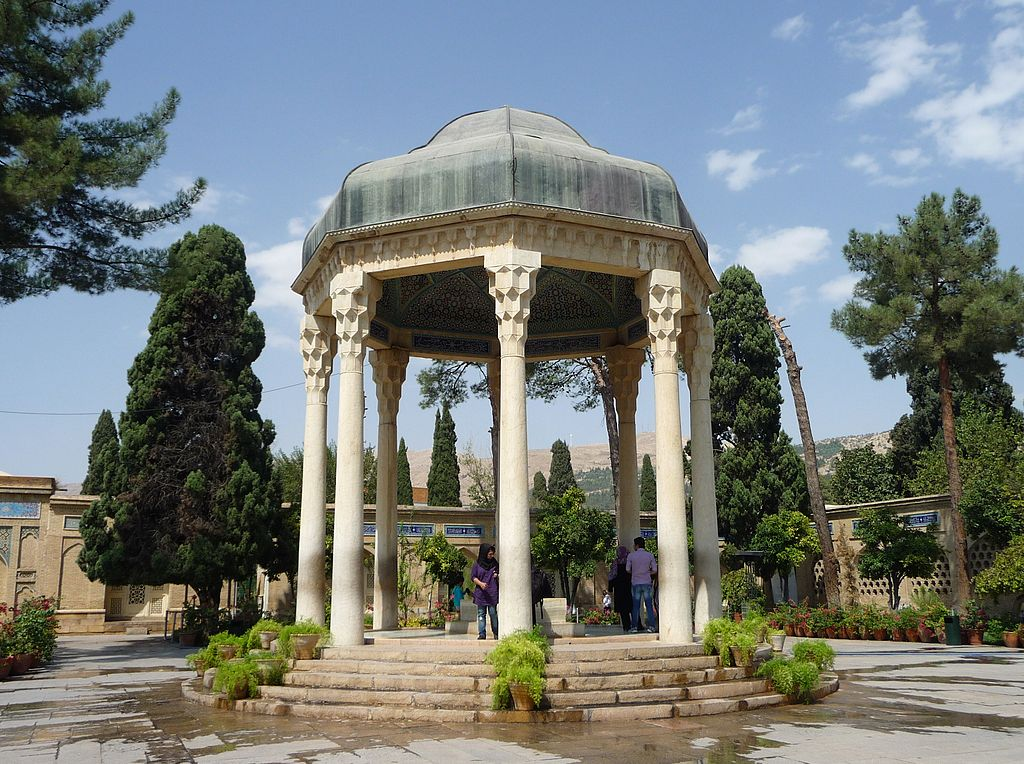
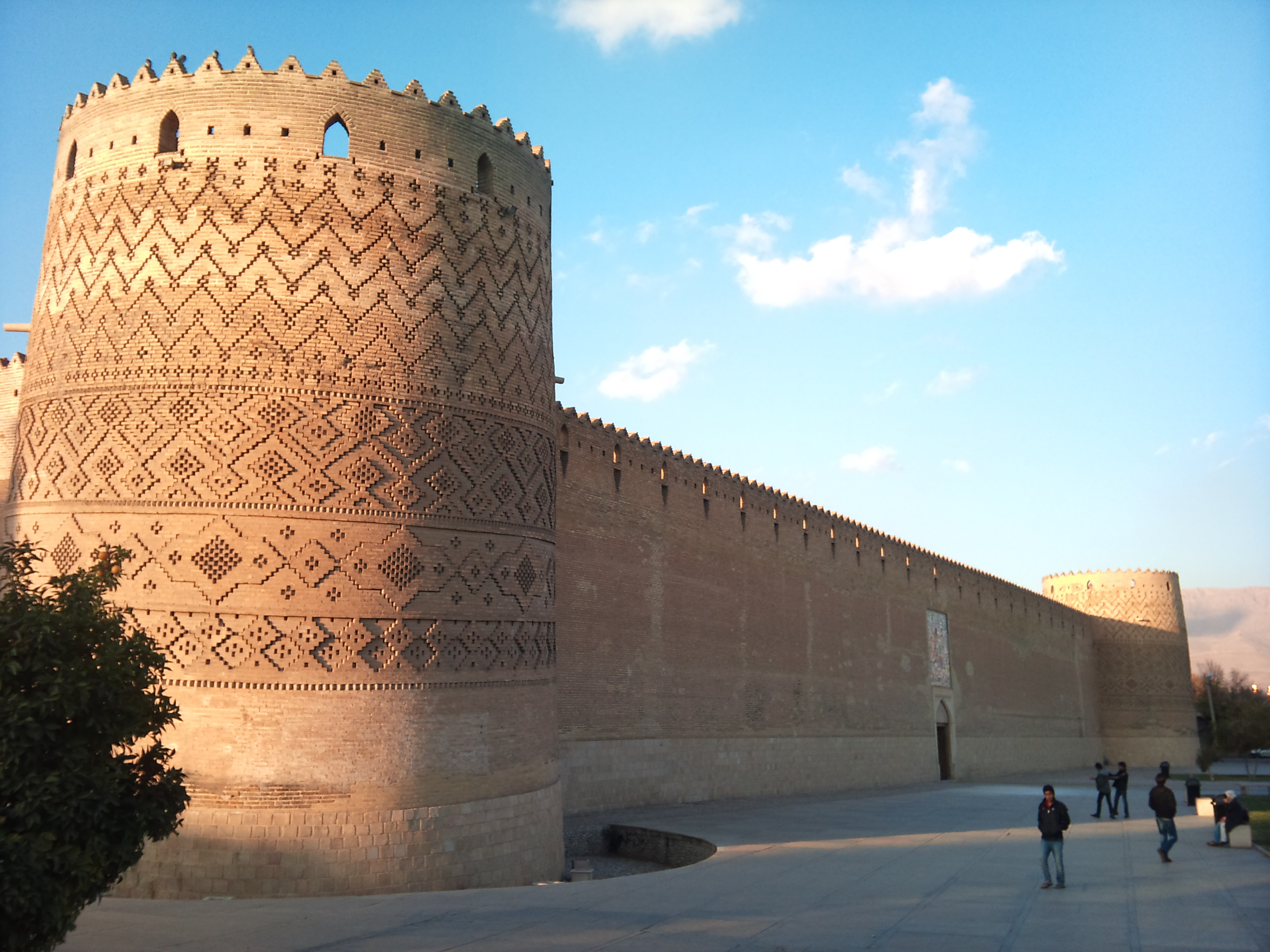
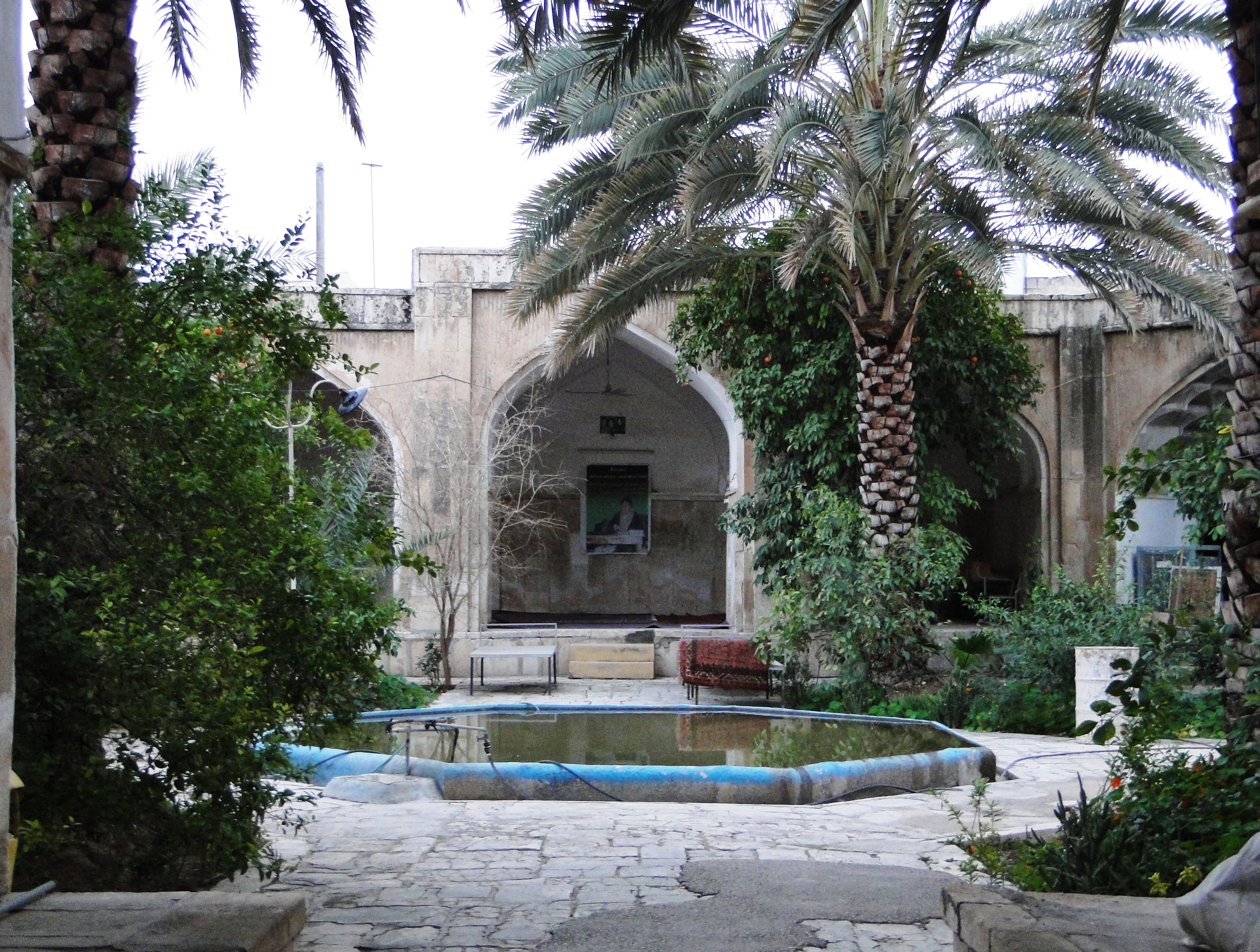
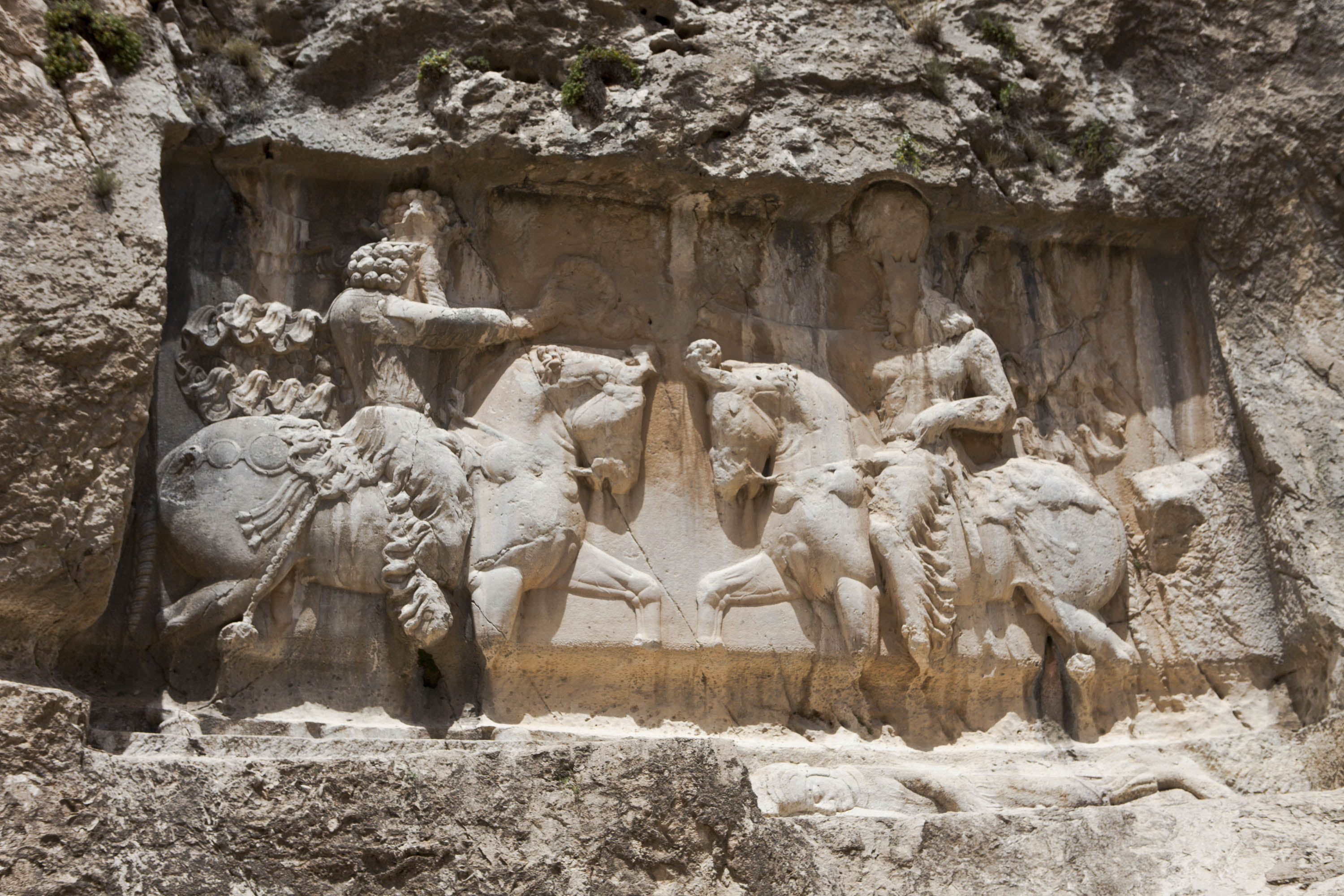
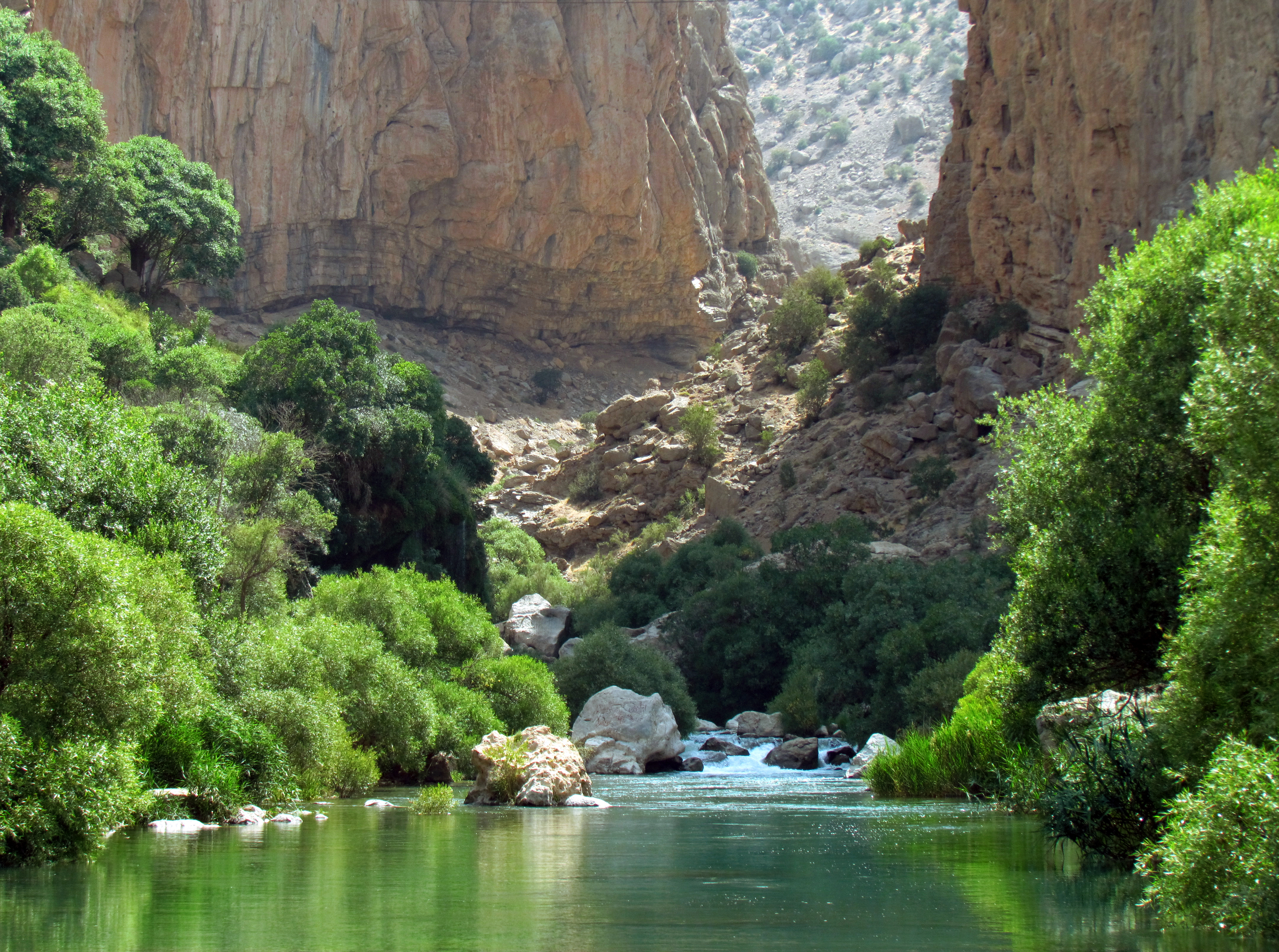

- Location of Fars Province within Iran
- Coordinates: 29°25′N 53°14′E
- Country: Iran
- Region: Region 2
- Capital: Shiraz
- Counties: 37

Government
  - Governor-general: Hossein-Ali Amiri (Independent)

Area
  - Total: 122,608 km^{2} (47,339 sq mi)

Population (2016)
  - Total: 4,851,274
  - Estimate (2020): 5,051,000
  - Rank: 4th
  - Density: 39.5674/km^{2} (102.479/sq mi)
- Time zone: UTC+03:30 (IRST)
- Area code: 071
- ISO 3166 code: IR-07
- Main language(s): Persian; Qashqai; Luri; Dialects of Fars

Fars province historical population
Year	Pop.	±%
2006	4,220,721	—
2011	4,596,658	+8.9%
2016	4,851,274	+5.5%

Fars Province, (Note: Persian: استان فارس, romanized: Ostâne Fârs, pronounced [osˈt̪ʰɒːne fɒː(ɹ)s]) historically known as Pars, Farsistan, and Persis, is one of the 31 provinces of Iran. Its capital is the city of Shiraz.

Fars province has an area of 122,400 km^{2} and is located in Iran's southwest, in Region 2. It neighbours the provinces of Bushehr to the west, Hormozgan to the south, Kerman and Yazd to the east, Isfahan to the north, and Kohgiluyeh and Boyer-Ahmad to the northwest.

== Etymology ==
The Persian word Fârs (فارس), derived from the earlier form Pârs (پارس), which is in turn derived from Pârsâ (𐎱𐎠𐎼𐎿), the native Old Persian name for the region and the source of the Ancient Greek word Persis. The English word Persia also originates from this region, ultimately through the Ancient Greek Persis.

Pars is the historical homeland of the Persian people. It was the homeland of the Achaemenid and Sasanian Persian dynasties of Iran, who reigned on the throne by the time of the ancient Persian Empires. The ruins of the Achaemenid capitals Pasargadae and Persepolis, among others, demonstrate the ancient history of the region. Due to the historical importance of this region, the entire country has historically been also referred to as Persia in the West. Prior to caliphate rule, this region was known as Pars.

== History ==
=== Persis ===
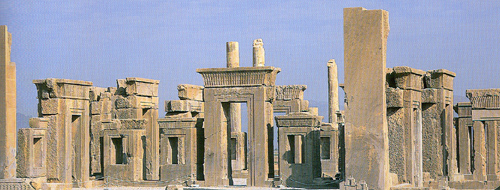
The ruins of Persepolis

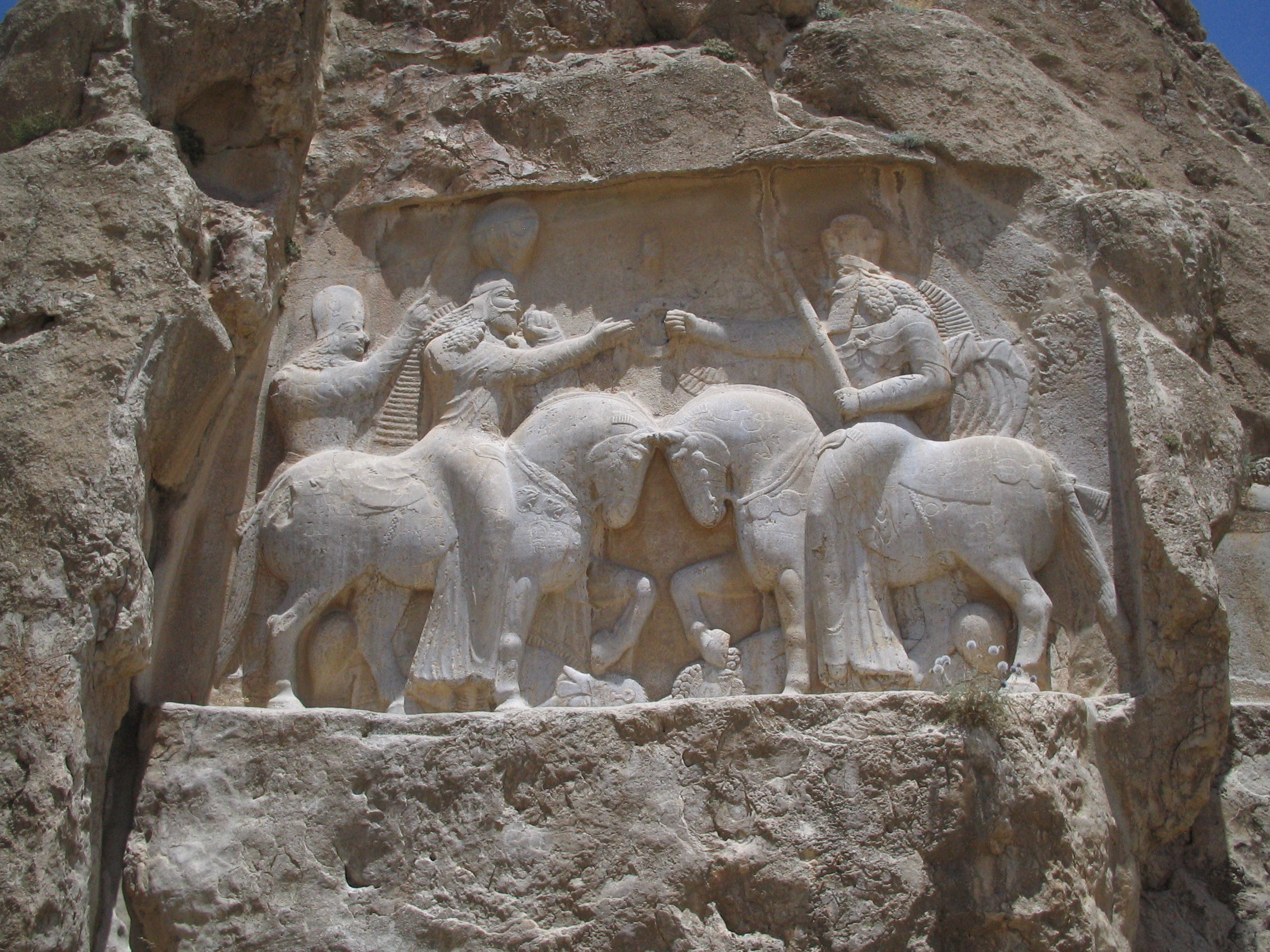
A Sassanid relief showing the investiture of Ardashir I

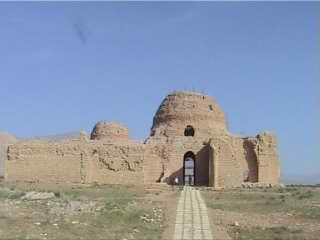
Sarvestan Palace in Sarvestan

The ancient Persians were present in the region from about the 10th century BC, and became the rulers of the largest empire the world had yet seen under the Achaemenid dynasty which was established in the mid 6th century BC, at its peak stretching from Thrace-Macedonia, Bulgaria-Paeonia and Eastern Europe proper in the west, to the Indus Valley in its far east. The ruins of Persepolis and Pasargadae, two of the four capitals of the Achaemenid Empire, are located in Pars.

The Achaemenid Empire was defeated by Alexander the Great in 333 BC, incorporating most of their vast empire. Shortly after this the Seleucid Empire was established. However, it never extended its power in Pars beyond the main trade routes, and by the reign of Antiochus I or possibly later Persis emerged as an independent state that minted its own coins.

The Seleucid Empire was subsequently defeated by the Parthians in 238 BC, but by 205 BC, the Seleucid king Antiochus III had extended his authority into Persis and it ceased to be an independent state.

Babak was the ruler of a small town called Kheir. Babak's efforts in gaining local power at the time escaped the attention of Artabanus IV, the Parthian Arsacid Emperor of the time. Babak and his eldest son Shapur I managed to expand their power over all of Persis.

The subsequent events are unclear. Following the death of Babak around 220, Ardashir who at the time was the governor of Darabgird, got involved in a power struggle of his own with his elder brother Shapur.

At this point, Ardashir moved his capital further to the south of Persis and founded a capital at Ardashir-Khwarrah (formerly Gur, modern day Firouzabad). After establishing his rule over Persis, Ardashir I rapidly extended the territory of his Sassanid Persian Empire, demanding fealty from the local princes of Pars, and gaining control over the neighboring provinces of Kerman, Isfahan, Susiana, and Mesene.

Artabanus marched a second time against Ardashir I in 224. Their armies clashed at Hormizdegan, where Artabanus IV was killed. Ardashir was crowned in 226 at Ctesiphon as the sole ruler of Persia, bringing the 400-year-old Parthian Empire to an end, and starting the virtually equally long rule of the Sassanian Empire, over an even larger territory, once again making Persia a leading power in the known world, only this time along with its arch-rival and successor to Persia's earlier opponents (the Roman Republic and the Roman Empire); the Byzantine Empire.

The Sassanids ruled for 425 years, until the Muslim armies conquered the empire. Afterwards, the Persians started to convert to Islam, this making it much easier for the new Muslim empire to continue the expansion of Islam.

Persis then passed hand to hand through numerous dynasties, leaving behind numerous historical and ancient monuments; each of which has its own values as a world heritage, reflecting the history of the province, Iran, and West Asia. The ruins of Bishapur, Persepolis, and Firouzabad are all reminders of this. The Arab invaders brought about an end to centuries of Zoroastrian political and cultural dominance over the region; supplanted as the faith of the ruling class in the 7th century by Islam, which and over the next 200 years gradually expanded to include a majority of the population.

== Demographics ==
=== Language and ethnicity ===
The main ethnic group in the province consists of indigenous Persians (including Larestani people and the Basseri), while Qashqai, Lurs, Arabs, Kurds, Georgians, and Circassians constitute minorities.

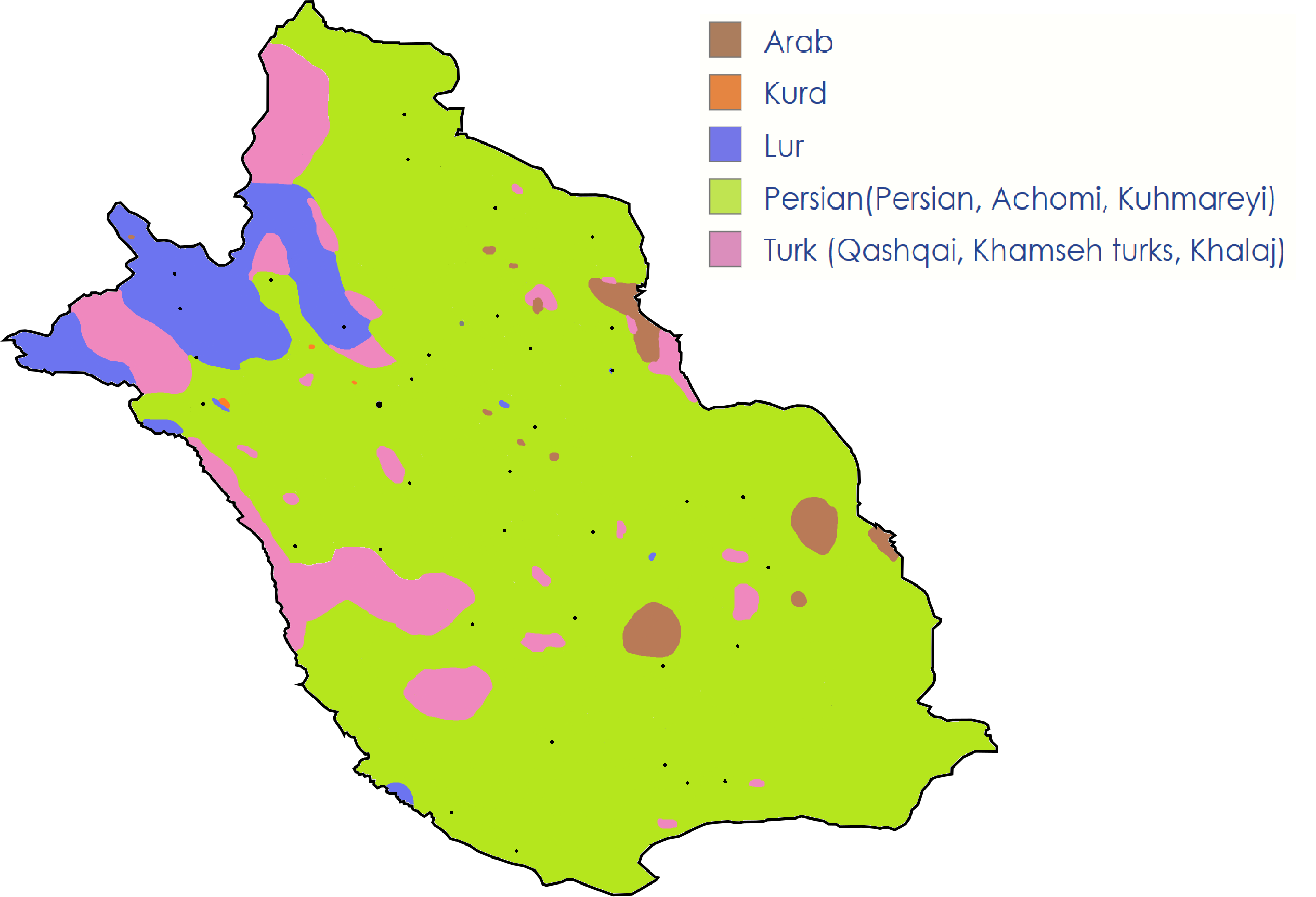
Majority Ethnic groups in fars province

Due to the geographical characteristics of Fars and its proximity to the Persian Gulf, Fars has long been a residing area for various peoples and rulers of Iran. However, the tribes of Fars including, Mamasani Lurs, Khamseh and Kohkiluyeh have kept their native and unique cultures and lifestyles which constitute part of the cultural heritage of Iran attracting many tourists. Kurdish tribes include Uriad, Zangana, Chegini, Kordshuli and Kuruni.

Among the hundreds of thousands of Georgians and Circassians that were transplanted to Persia under Shah Abbas I, his predecessors, and successors, a certain amount of them were to guard the main caravan routes; many were settled around Āspās and other villages along the old Isfahan-Shiraz road. By now the vast majority Caucasians that were settled in Pars have lost their cultural, linguistic, and religious identity, having mostly been assimilated into the population.

=== Population ===
At the time of the 2006 National Census, the province's population was 4,220,721 people in 1,014,690 households. The following census in 2011 counted 4,596,658 people in 1,250,135 households, of whom 67.6% were registered as urban dwellers (urban/suburbs), 32.1% villagers (small town/rural), and 0.3% nomad tribes. The 2016 census measured the population of the province as 4,851,274 people in 1,443,027 households.

=== Administrative divisions ===
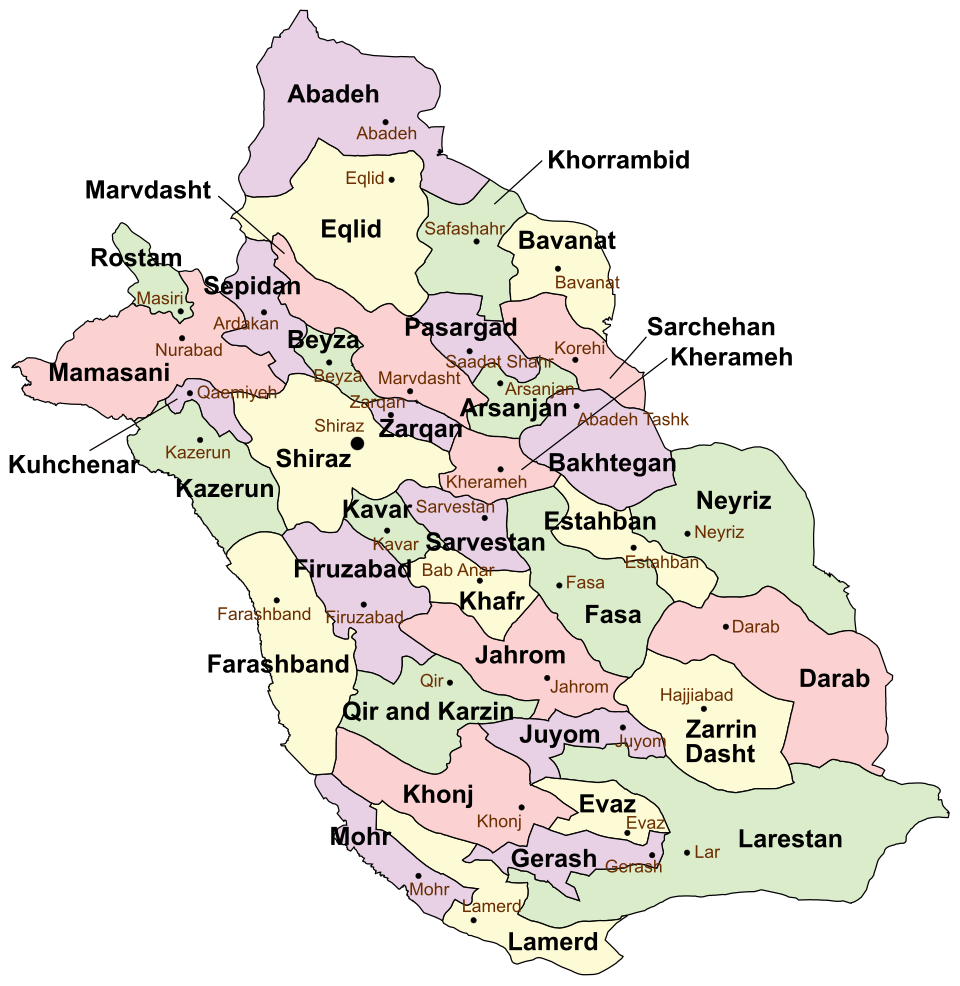

The population history and structural changes of Fars province's administrative divisions over three consecutive censuses are shown in the following table.

Pars province
Counties	2006	2011	2016
Abadeh	87,203	98,188	100,831
Arsanjan	40,916	41,476	42,725
Bakhtegan (Note: Separated from Neyriz County after the 2016 census)	—	—	—
Bavanat	44,069	48,416	50,418
Beyza (Note: Separated from Sepidan County after the 2016 census)	—	—	—
Darab	172,938	189,345	201,489
Eqlid	99,003	93,975	93,763
Estahban	66,391	66,172	68,850
Evaz (Note: Separated from Larestan County after the 2016 census)	—	—	—
Farashband	38,679	42,760	45,459
Fasa	188,189	203,129	205,187
Firuzabad	111,973	119,721	121,417
Gerash (Note: Separated from Larestan County after the 2006 census)	—	47,055	53,907
Jahrom	197,331	209,312	228,532
Juyom (Note: Separated from Larestan County after the 2016 census)	—	—	—
Kavar (Note: Separated from Shiraz County after the 2006 census)	—	77,836	83,883
Kazerun	258,097	254,704	266,217
Khafr (Note: Separated from Jahrom County after the 2016 census)	—	—	—
Kharameh (Note: Separated from Shiraz County after the 2011 census)	—	61,580	54,864
Khonj	37,978	41,133	41,359
Khorrambid	44,669	50,252	50,522
Kuhchenar (Note: Separated from Kazerun County after the 2016 census)	—	—	—
Lamerd	76,971	83,916	91,782
Larestan	223,235	226,879	213,920
Mamasani	162,694	116,386	117,527
Marvdasht	294,621	307,492	323,434
Mohr	54,094	59,727	64,827
Neyriz	105,241	113,750	113,291
Pasargad	29,825	31,504	30,118
Qir and Karzin	61,432	65,045	71,203
Rostam (Note: Separated from Mamasani County after the 2006 census)	—	46,851	44,386
Sarchehan (Note: Separated from Bavanat County after the 2016 census)	—	—	—
Sarvestan (Note: Separated from Shiraz County after the 2006 census)	—	40,531	38,114
Sepidan	87,801	89,398	91,049
Shiraz	1,676,927	1,700,687	1,869,001
Zarqan (Note: Separated from Shiraz County after the 2016 census)	—	—	—
Zarrin Dasht	60,444	69,438	73,199
Total	4,220,721	4,596,658	4,851,274

=== Cities ===
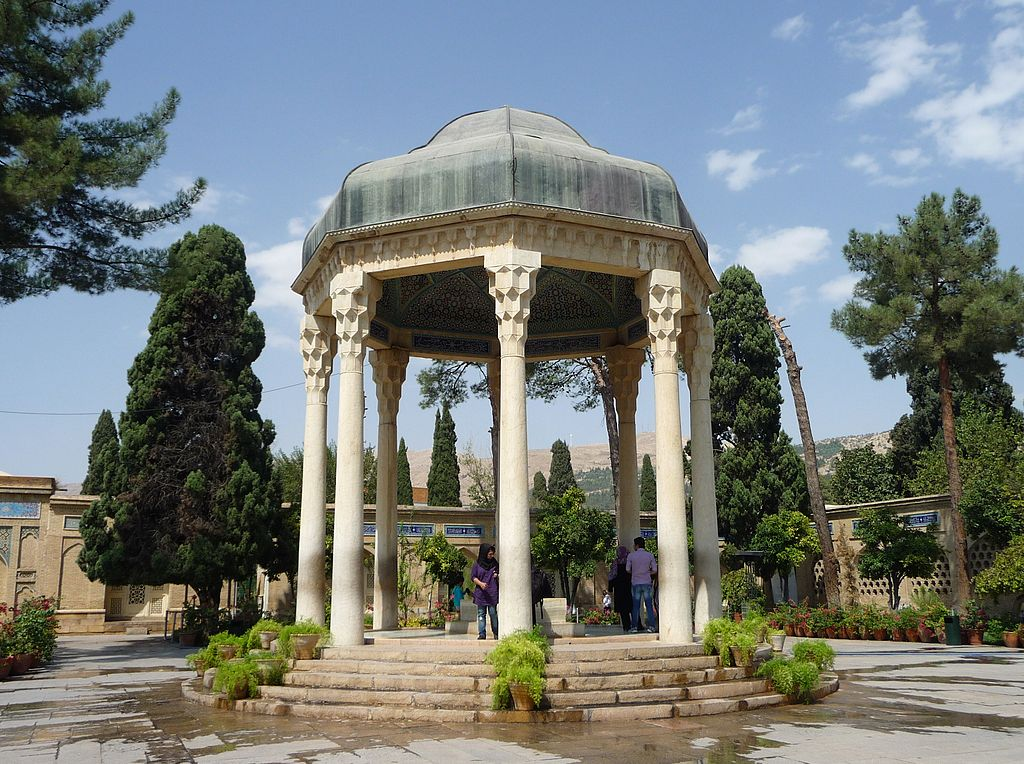
Shiraz

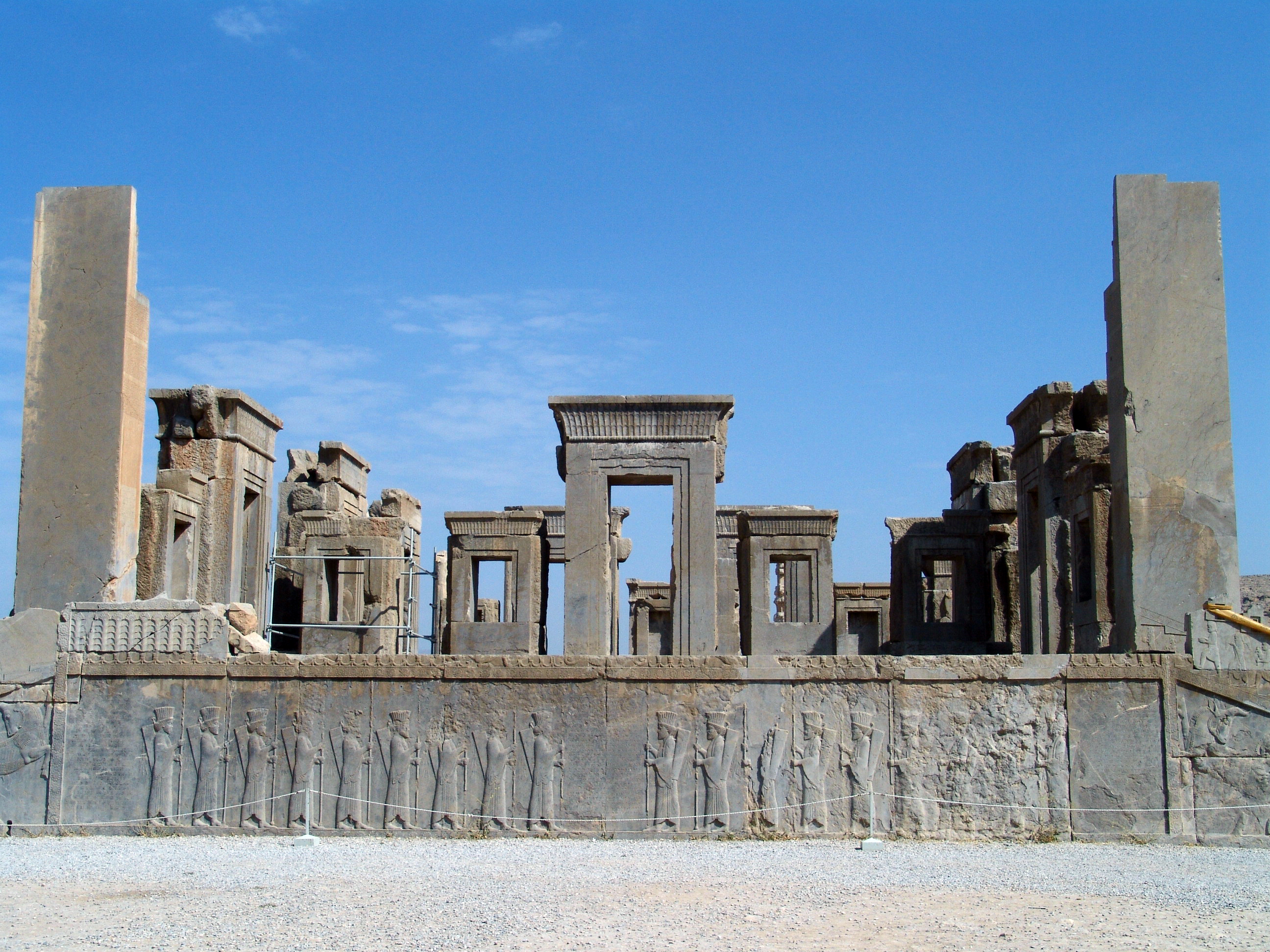
Marvdasht

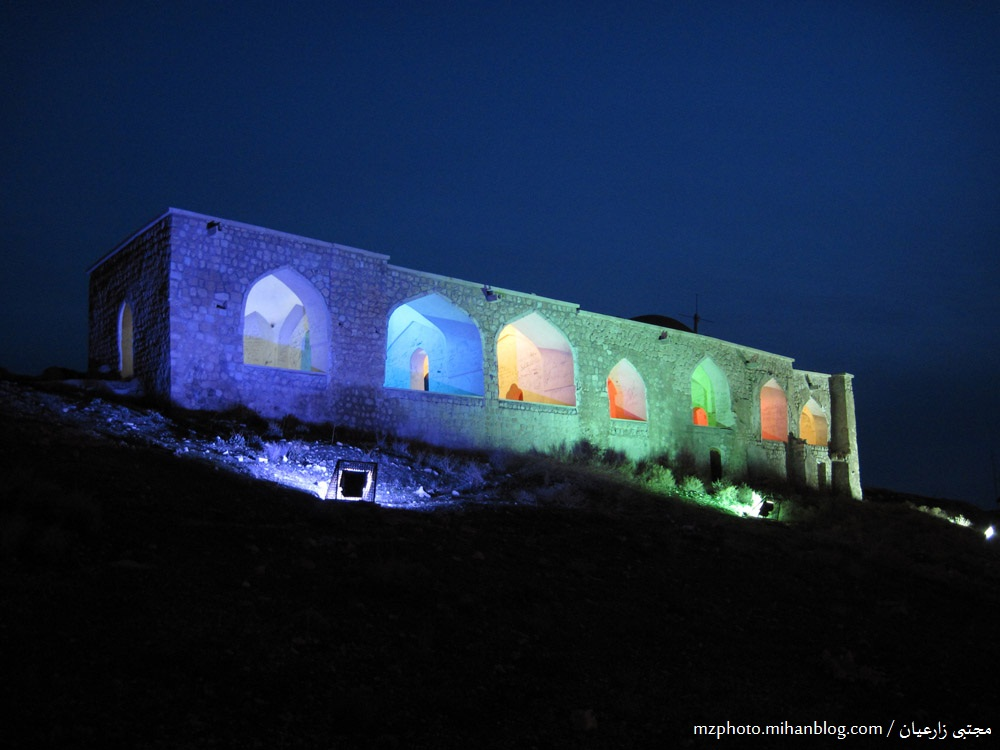
Jahrom

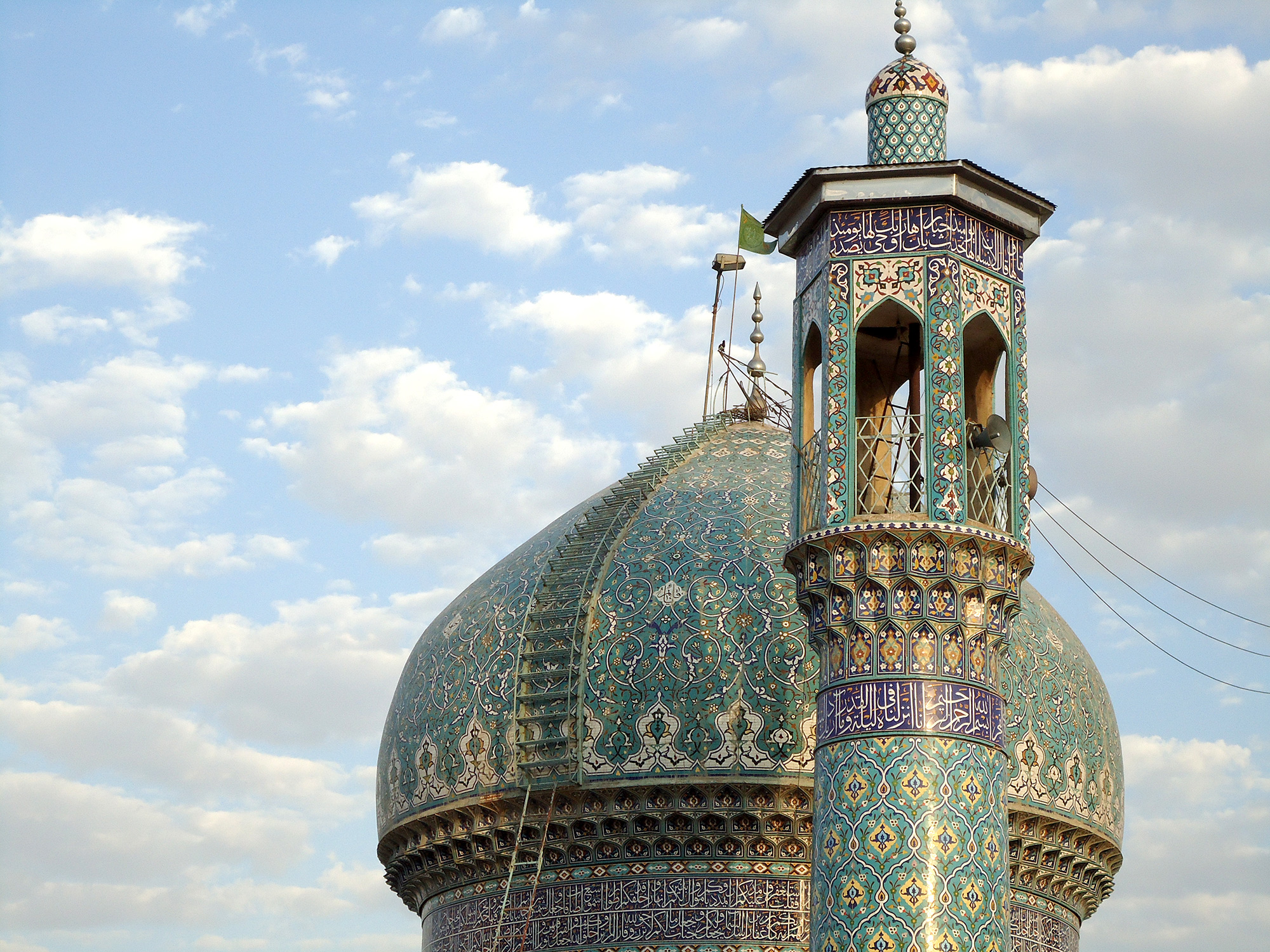
Fasa

According to the 2016 census, 3,401,675 people (over 70% of the population of Pars province) live in the following cities:

City	Population
Abadeh	59,116
Abadeh Tashk	7,379
Ahel	3,179
Alamarvdasht	4,068
Ardakan	14,633
Arsanjan	17,706
Asir	3,042
Bab Anar	7,061
Baba Monir	1,379
Bahman	7,568
Baladeh	5,972
Banaruiyeh	9,077
Beyram	7,300
Beyza	7,252
Darab	70,232
Darian	10,037
Dehram	3,468
Dezhkord	3,924
Do Borji	2,907
Dobiran	13,809
Duzeh	1,348
Efzar	2,657
Emad Deh	4,235
Emam Shahr	5,803
Eqlid	44,341
Eshkanan	9,115
Estahban	36,410
Evaz	19,987
Fadami	4,097
Farashband	20,320
Fasa	110,825
Firuzabad	65,417
Galleh Dar	13,448
Gerash	34,469
Hajjiabad	21,675
Hamashahr	3,852
Hasanabad	2,045
Hesami	3,131
Ij	6,246
Izadkhast	5,910
Jahrom	141,634
Jannat Shahr	13,598
Juyom	8,010
Kamfiruz	3,713
Karzin	8,841
Kavar	31,711
Kazerun	96,683
Khaneh Zenyan	4,027
Khaniman	3,020
Khavaran	4,332
Kherameh	18,477
Khesht	9,599
Khonj	19,217
Khumeh Zar	6,220
Khur	7,338
Khuzi	3,245
Konartakhteh	6,081
Korehi	3,954
Kuhenjan	3,281
Kupon	3,237
Lamerd	29,380
Lapui	8,985
Lar	62,045
Latifi	7,300
Madar-e Soleyman	1,546
Marvdasht	148,858
Masiri	9,031
Mazayjan	3,567
Meshkan	4,617
Meymand	10,120
Miyan Deh	5,912
Mobarakabad	4,707
Mohr	7,784
Neyriz	49,850
Now Bandegan	2,410
Nowdan	2,892
Nujin	3,769
Nurabad	57,058
Qaderabad	14,973
Qaemiyeh	26,918
Qarah Bolagh	6,772
Qatruyeh	2,895
Qir	20,010
Qotbabad	7,476
Ramjerd	2,550
Runiz	5,760
Saadat Shahr	17,131
Safashahr	26,933
Sarvestan	18,187
Sedeh	6,747
Seyyedan	8,574
Shahr-e Pir	8,927
Shahr-e Sadra	91,863
Sheshdeh	5,960
Shiraz	1,565,572
Soghad	12,582
Soltanabad	1,928
Surian	9,776
Surmaq	3,050
Varavi	4,622
Zahedshahr	9,719
Zarqan	32,261

=== Most populous cities ===
The following sorted table lists the most populous cities in Pars according to the 2016 census results announced by the Statistical Center of Iran.

Most populous urban areas in Pars province
Rank	City	County	Population
1	Shiraz	Shiraz	1,565,572
2	Marvdasht	Marvdasht	148,858
3	Jahrom	Jahrom	141,634
4	Fasa	Fasa	110,825
5	Kazerun	Kazerun	96,683
6	Sadra	Shiraz	91,863
7	Darab	Darab	70,232
8	Firuzabad	Firuzabad	65,417
9	Lar	Larestan	62,045
10	Abadeh	Abadeh	59,116

== Climate and wildlife ==
There are three distinct climatic regions in the Pars province. First, the mountainous area of the north and northwest with moderate cold winters and mild summers. Secondly, the central regions, with relatively rainy mild winters, and hot dry summers. The third region located in the south and southeast has cold winters with hot summers. The average temperature of Shiraz is 16.8 °C, ranging between 4.7 °C and 29.2 °C.

The geographical and climatic variation of the province causes varieties of plants; consequently, variation of wildlife has been formed in the province. Additional to the native animals of the province, many kinds of birds migrate to the province every year. Many kinds of ducks, storks and swallows migrate to this province in an annual parade. The main native animals of the province are gazelle, deer, mountain wild goat, ram, ewe and many kinds of birds. In the past, like in Khuzestan Plain, the Persian lion had occurred here.

The province of Pars includes many protected wildlife zones. The most important protected zones are:

- Toot Siah (Black Berry) Hunt Forbidden Zone, which is located at the end of Boanat region.
- Basiran Hunt Forbidden Zone, which is located 4 kilometers south to Abadeh;
- Bamu National Park, which is located north-east of Shiraz;
- Estahban Forest Park (Parke Jangaly), which is located on the outskirts of Touraj mountain;
- Hermoodlar Protected Zone, which is located east to Larestan.
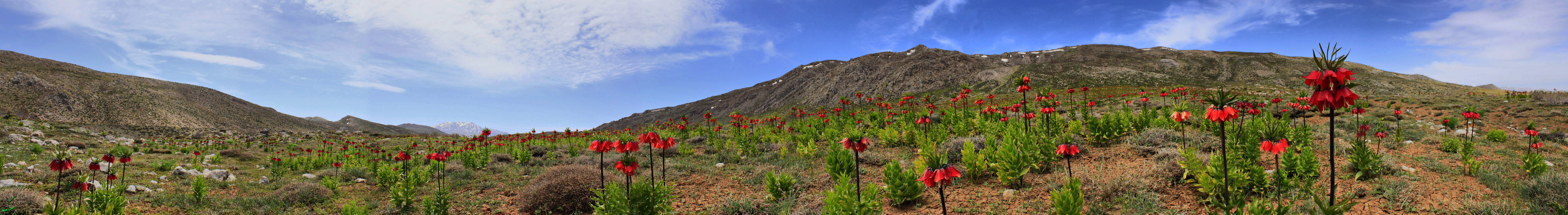
Crown imperial plain, Sepidan

Arjan Meadow 22 km^{2} (8.5 sq mi) and Lake Parishan 40 km^{2} (15 sq mi) are designated Wetlands of International Importance under the Ramsar convention.

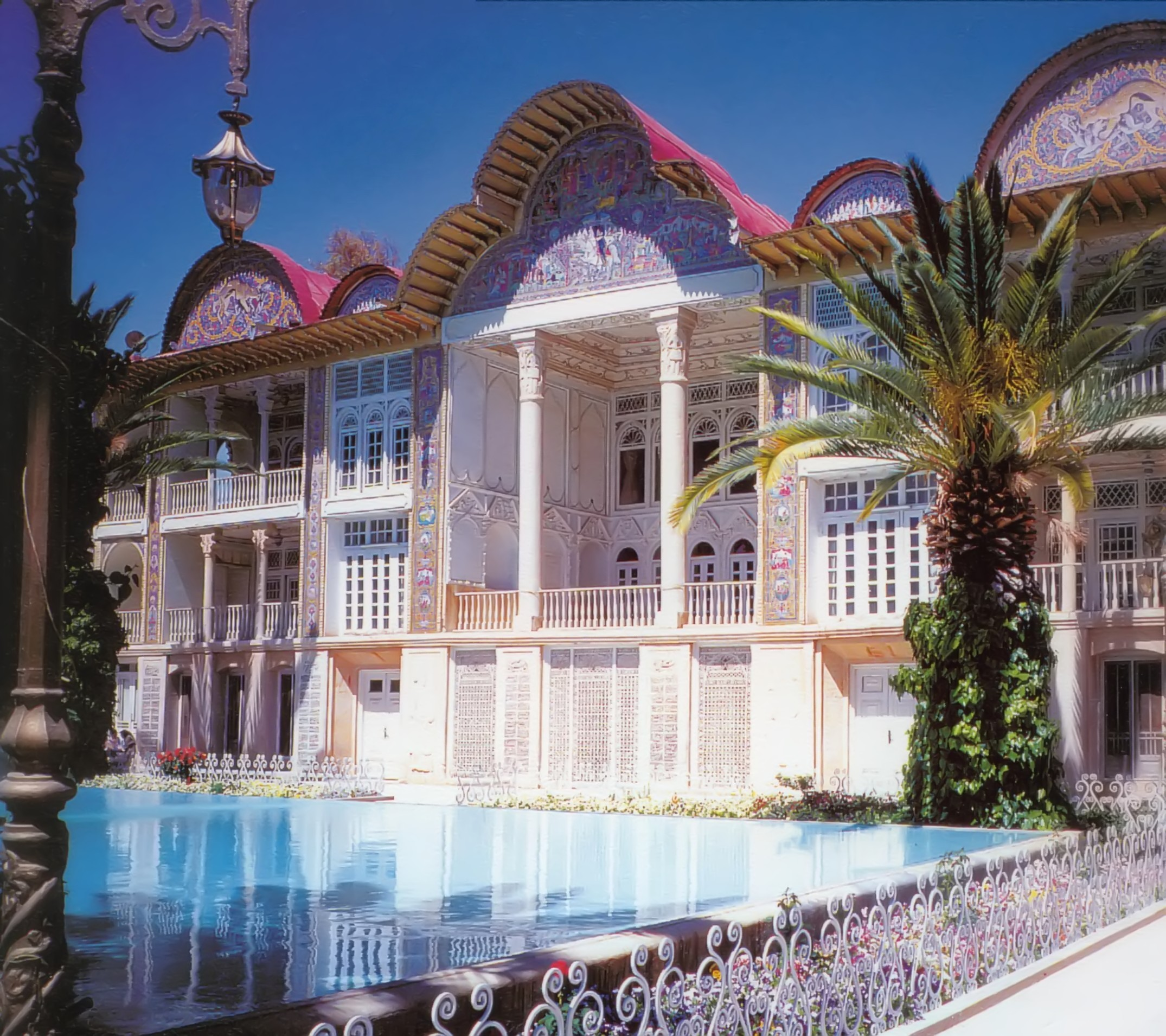
Eram Garden

== Economy ==
Agriculture is of great importance in Pars. The major products include cereal (wheat and barley), citrus fruits, dates, sugar beets and cotton. Pars has major petrochemical facilities, along with an oil refinery, a factory for producing tires, a large electronics industry, and a sugar mill. Tourism is also a large industry in the province. UNESCO has designated an area in the province, called Arzhan (known as Dasht e Arjan) as a biosphere reserve. Shiraz, provincial capital of Pars, is the namesake of Shirazi wine. A large number of wine factories existed in the city.

== Transportation ==
Shiraz Airport is the main international airport of the province and the second in the country. The cities of Jahrom, Lar and Lamerd also have airports linking them with Shiraz and Tehran and nearby Persian Gulf countries such as the UAE and Bahrain. Shiraz is along the main route from Tehran to southern Iran.

== Higher education ==
The Pars province is home to many higher education institutes and universities. The main universities of the province include Shiraz University, Shiraz University of Arts, Shiraz University of Medical Sciences, Shiraz University of Technology, Salman Farsi University of Kazerun, Jahrom University, Jahrom University of Medical Sciences, Fasa University of Medical Sciences, Islamic Azad University of Shiraz, and Islamic Azad University of Jahrom.

== Notable people ==
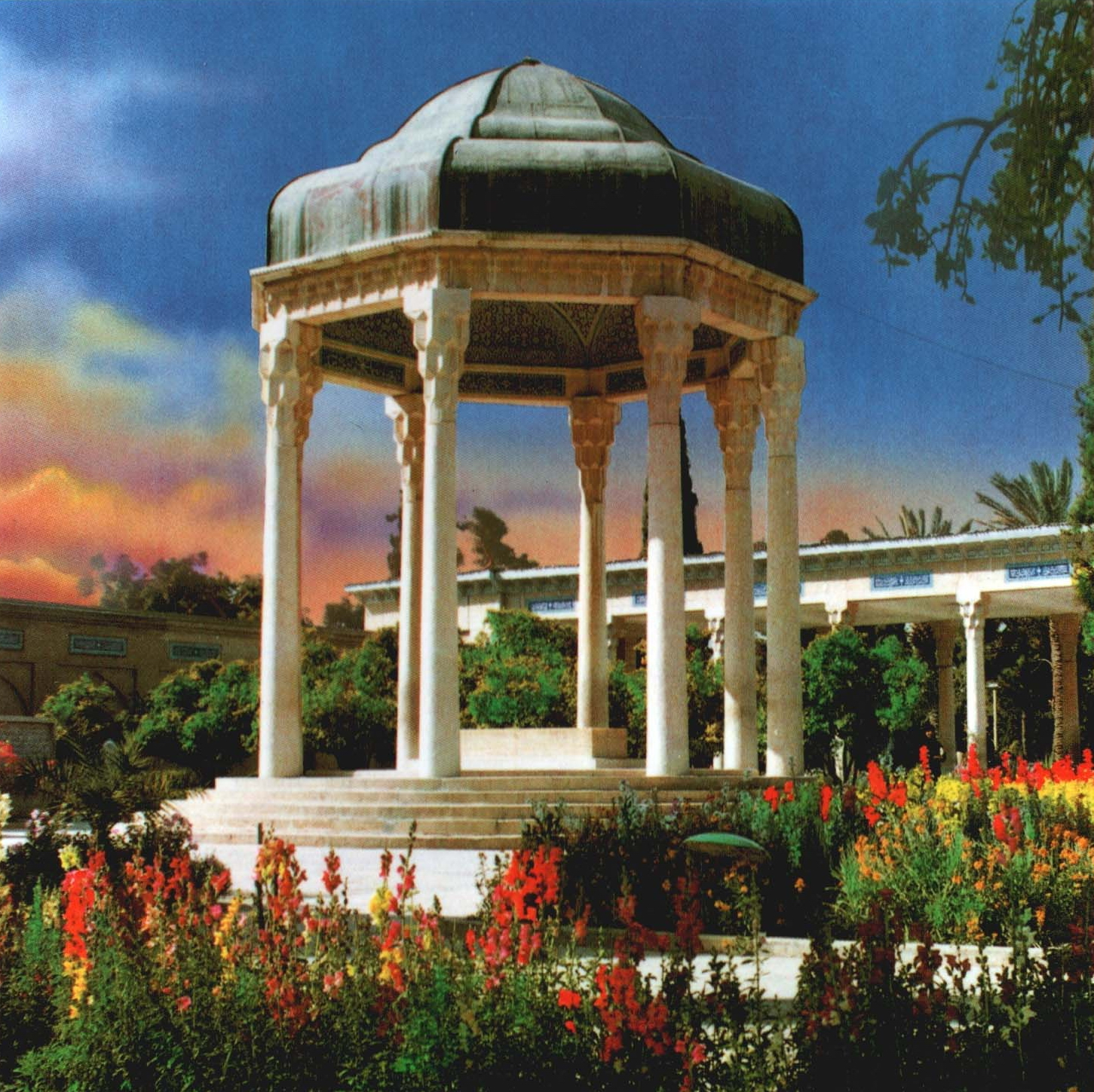
Tomb of Hafez

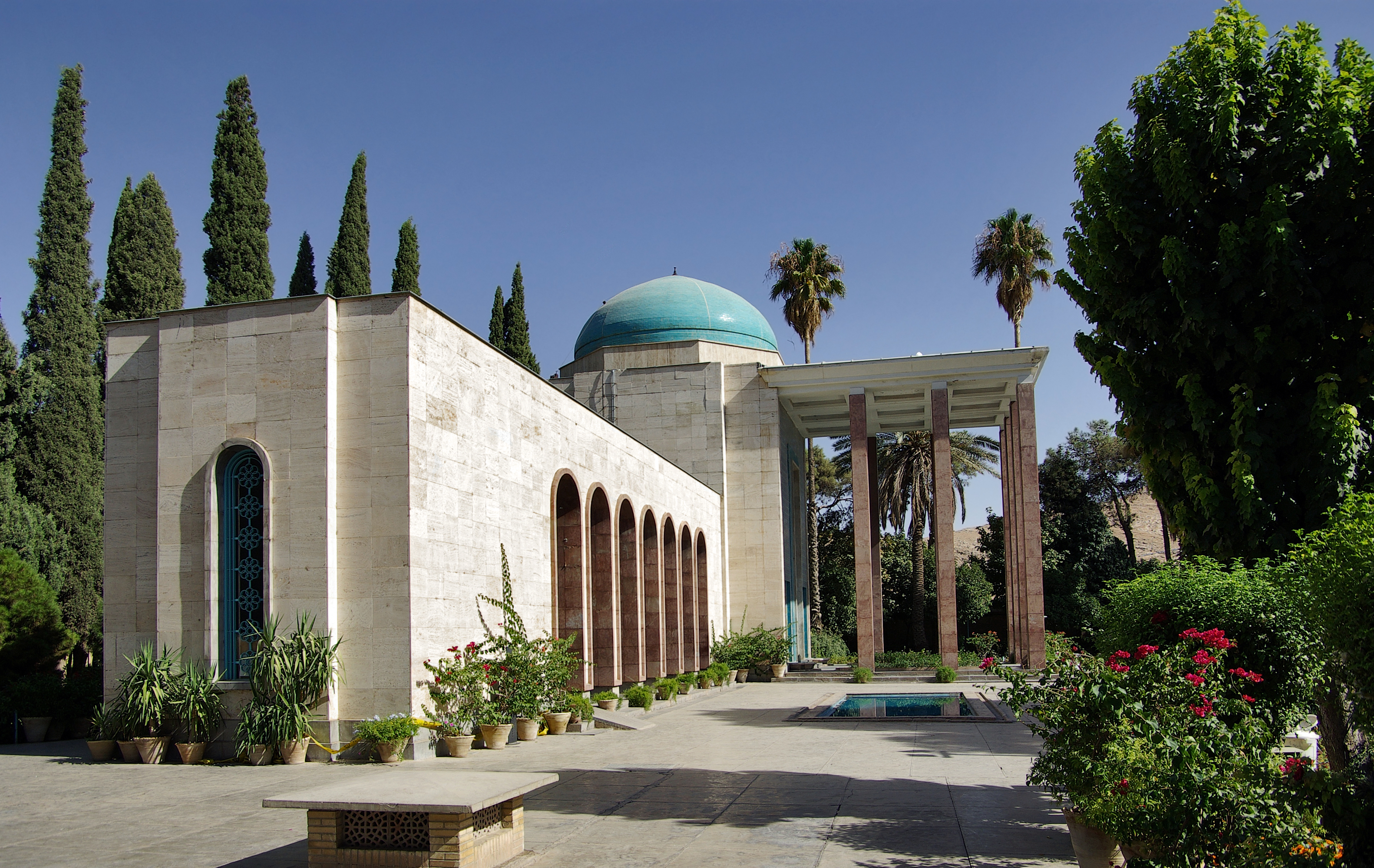
Tomb of Saadi

- Cyrus the Great, founder of the Achaemenian Empire
- Ardashir the Unifier, founder of the Sassanian Empire
- Karim Khan, founder of the Zand dynasty
- Lotf Ali Khan, the last ruler of the Zand dynasty
- Saadi, writer and poet, born and died in Shiraz
- Hafez Shirazi, poet, born and died in Shiraz
- Barbad, the Persian musician of the Sassanid era, born in Jahrom
- Mulla Sadra, Iranian Shia Islamic philosopher and theologian
- Qotb al-Din Kazeruni, born in Kazerun
- Mansur Hallaj, Persian mystic, killed in the 9th century AD
- Salman the Persian, a companion of the Islamic prophet Muhammad and the first Persian who converted to Islam
- Gholamhossein Saber, artist
- Reza Malekzadeh, born in Kazerun
- Christiane Amanpour's father is originally from Sarvestan, Fars.
- Sibawayh, one of the founders of Arabic grammar, died in Shiraz
- Hakim Salman Jahromi, the special doctor of Abbas the Great. He was from Jahrom.
- Ibn Muqaffa, or Ruzbeh Dadwayh, Persian writer and translator from the 8th century AD
- Zahra Kazemi, photographer, born in Shiraz
- Ladan and Laleh Bijani, famous conjoined twins, born in Shiraz
- Khwaju Kermani, buried in Shiraz
- Jamshid Amouzegar
- Seyyed Zia'eddin Tabatabaee, born in Shiraz
- Ibn Khafif, a 9th-century sage, buried in Shiraz
- Sheikh Ruzbehan
- Afshin Ghotbi, football manager of Iranian National Team
- Meulana Shahin Shirazi, Persian Jewish poet and wiseman
- Junayd Shirazi
- Mohsen Kadivar
- Ata'ollah Mohajerani, representative of Shiraz in the Majlis
- Saeed Emami
- Gholam Reza Azhari
- Siyyid Mírzá 'Alí-Muhammad, the Báb
- Mohammad Hashem Pesaran, the most honored Iranian economist
- Firouz Naderi, Iranian-American scientist and the associate director of NASA's Jet Propulsion Laboratory (JPL), responsible for Project Formulation and Strategy. He was born in Shiraz.
- Ebrahim Golestan, filmmaker and literary figure
- Kaveh Golestan, photojournalist and artist
- Habibollah Peyman, Iranian politician
- Mohsen Safaei Farahani, Iranian politician
- Simin Daneshvar, academic, renowned novelist, fiction writer and translator

== See also ==
Media related to Fars Province at Wikimedia Commons

Fars travel guide from Wikivoyage

== Bibliography ==
- W. Barthold (1984). "Fars". An Historical Geography of Iran. Translated by Svat Soucek. Princeton University Press. pp. 148–168. ISBN 978-1-4008-5322-9.
