= Qaleh-ye Seyyed =

Qaleh-ye Seyyed or Qaleh-i-Saiyid (Persian: قلعه سيد) may refer to various places in Iran:

- Qaleh-ye Seyyed, Kazerun, Fars Province
- Qaleh-ye Seyyed, alternate name of Borj-e Seyyed, Kazerun County, Fars Province
- Qaleh-ye Seyyed, Mohr, Fars Province
- Qaleh-ye Seyyed, Behbahan, Khuzestan Province
- Qaleh-ye Seyyed, Dezful, Khuzestan Province
- Qaleh-ye Seyyed, Ramhormoz, Khuzestan Province
- Qaleh-ye Seyyed, Tehran
