= Khowshabad =

Khowshabad or Khvoshabad or Khushabad (Persian: خوش اباد), also rendered as Khosh Abad, may refer to:

- Khvoshabad, Ardabil
- Khvoshabad, Fars
- Khvoshabad, Hamadan
- Khvoshabad, Hormozgan
- Khowshabad, Isfahan
- Khvoshabad, Razavi Khorasan
- Khowshabad, South Khorasan
