= List of earthquakes in 2020 =

Earthquakes in 2020
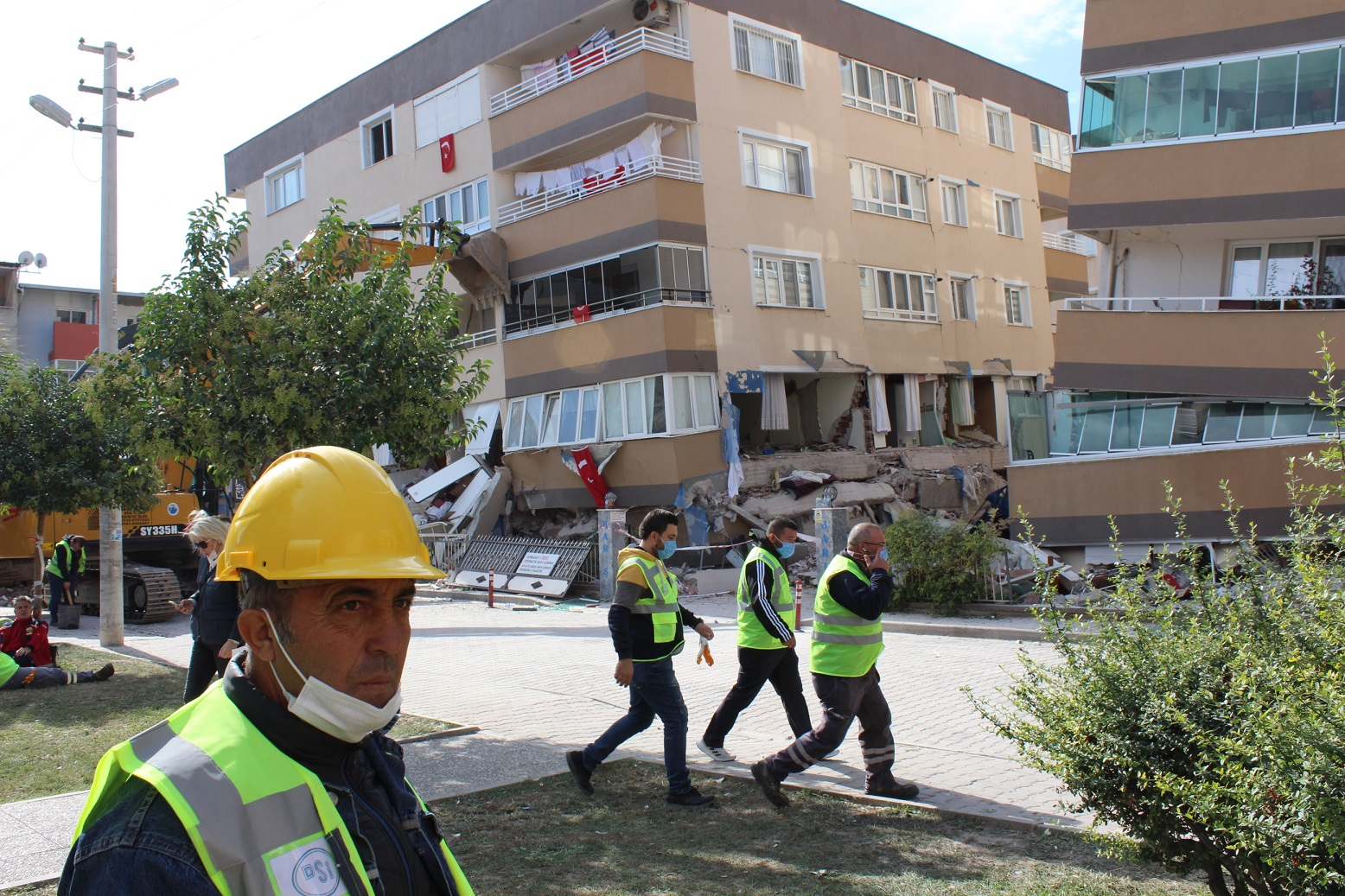
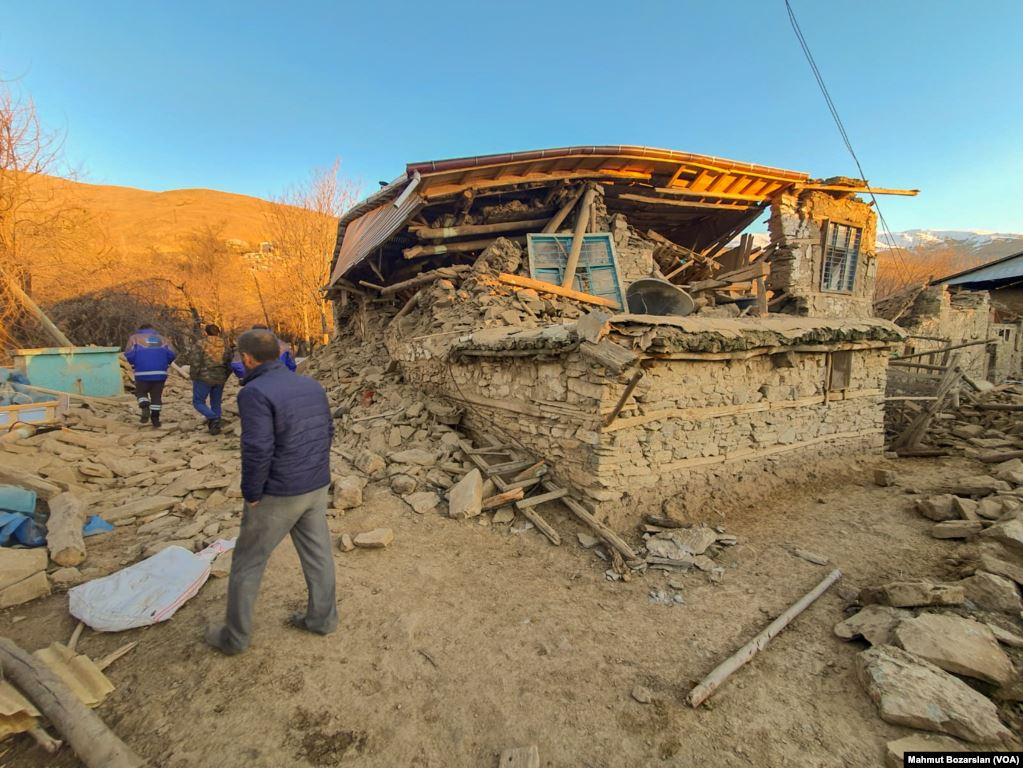
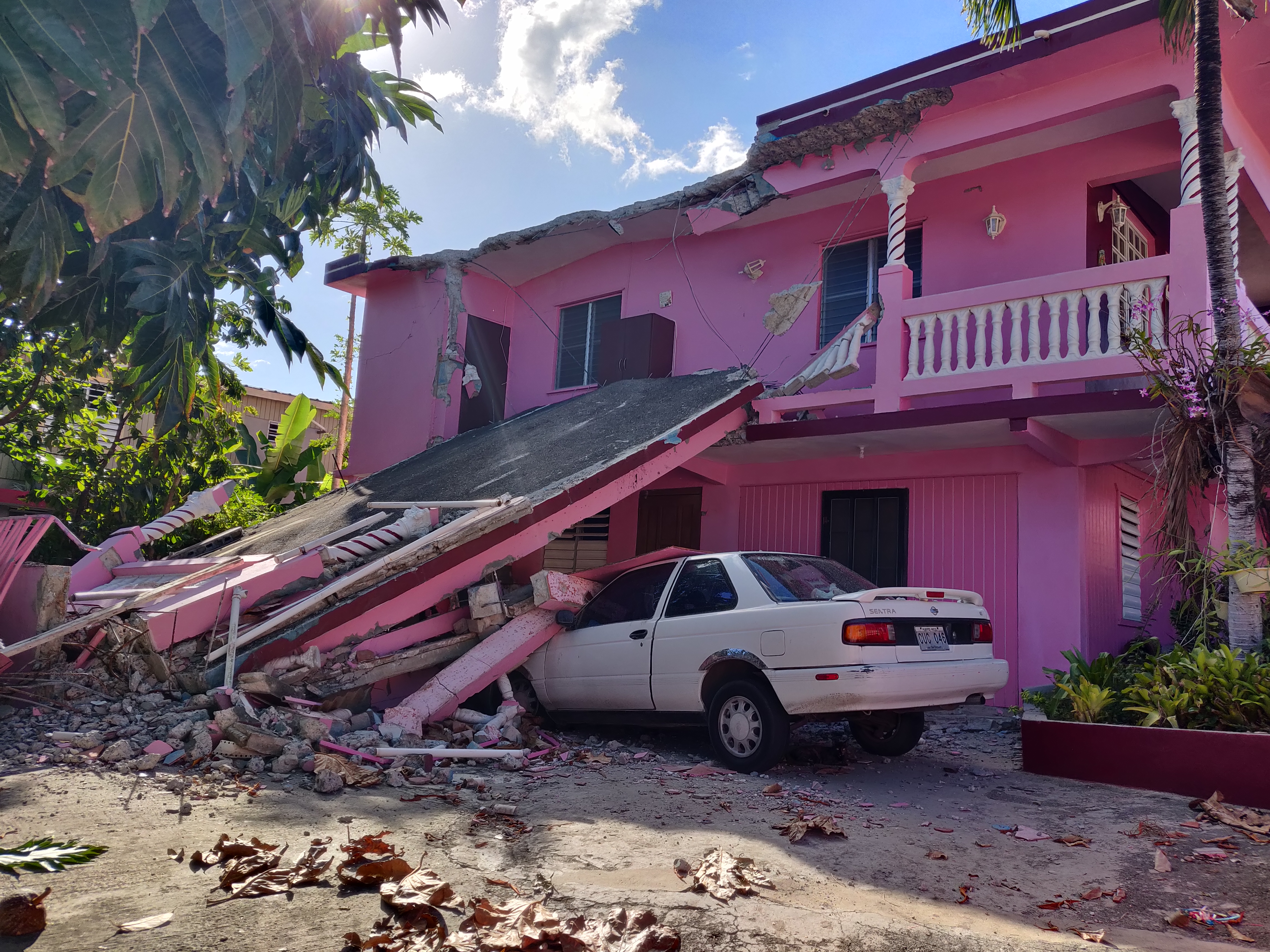
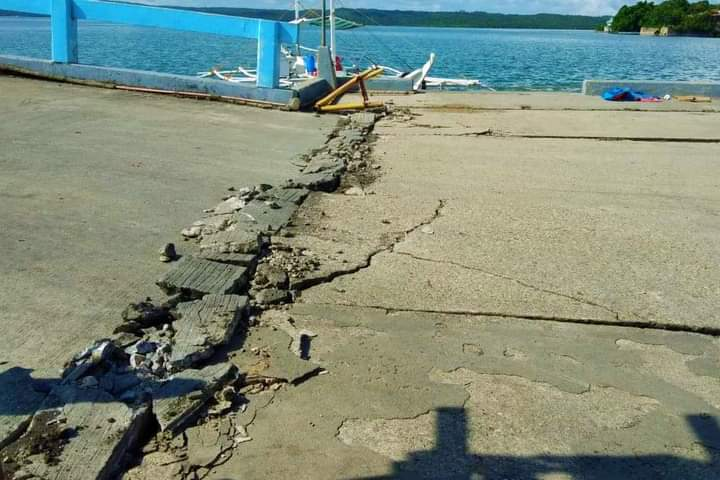
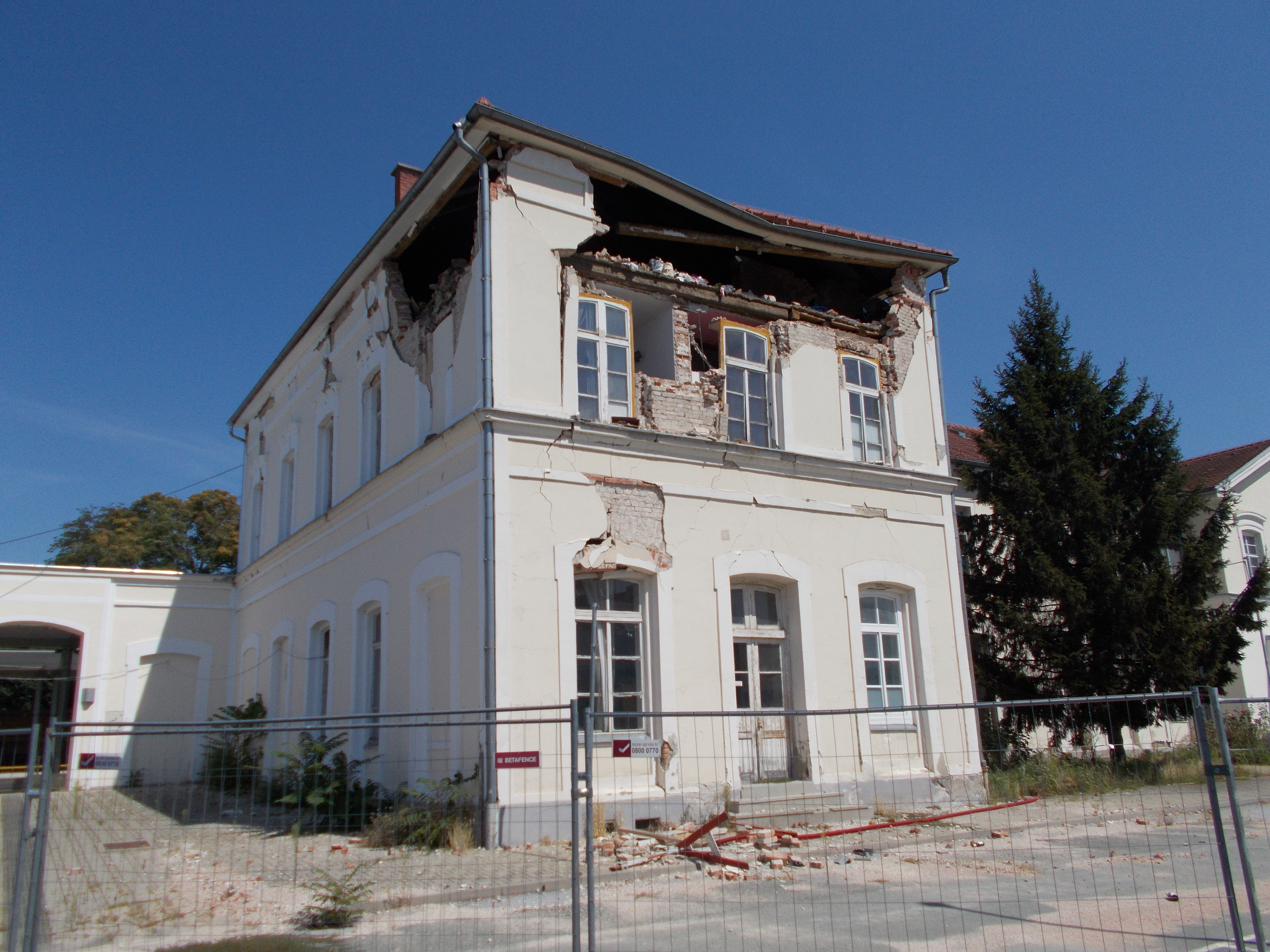
- From top, left to right: Emergency workers walk past a partially collapsed apartment in İzmir after the 2020 Aegean Sea earthquake • A damaged building in the village of Çevtaş in Sivrice after the 2020 Elazığ earthquake • Collapsed house in Yauco after the series of 2019–20 Puerto Rico earthquakes • Cracks found in Cataingan Port following the 2020 Masbate earthquake • Damage to station buildings in Sisak after the 2020 Petrinja earthquake

Approximate epicenters of notable earthquakes in 2020
- 4.0–5.9 magnitude
- 6.0–6.9 magnitude
- 7.0–7.9 magnitude
- 8.0+ magnitude
- Strongest: 7.8 M_{w} (United States) United States
- Deadliest: 7.0 M_{w} (Greece) Greece; 119 deaths
- Total fatalities: 209

Number by magnitude
- 9.0+: 0
- 8.0–8.9: 0
- 7.0–7.9: 9
- 6.0–6.9: 112
- 5.0–5.9: 1,315
- 4.0–4.9: 12,216

This is a list of earthquakes in 2020. Only earthquakes of magnitude 6 or above are included, unless they result in damage and/or casualties, or are notable for other reasons. All dates are listed according to UTC time. Maximum intensities are indicated on the Modified Mercalli intensity scale and are sourced from United States Geological Survey (USGS) ShakeMap data.

For the second consecutive year, activity was well below average, with only nine major quakes, it was also the first year since 2016 with no magnitude 8.0+ earthquakes. With just over 200 deaths reported, it is the least deadly year in the 21st century for earthquakes, but almost all of them came from Turkey, struck by three deadly events. In the last days of the year, Croatia experienced one of its strongest earthquakes in its history, with casualties and structural damage.

== Compared to other years ==
Number of earthquakes worldwide for 2010–2020
Magnitude	2010	2011	2012	2013	2014	2015	2016	2017	2018	2019	2020
8.0–9.9	1	1	2	2	1	1	0	1	1	1	0
7.0–7.9	23	19	14	17	11	18	16	6	16	9	9
6.0–6.9	151	187	117	123	143	127	131	104	118	135	112
5.0–5.9	2,220	2,486	1,546	1,460	1,580	1,413	1,550	1,447	1,671	1,484	1,315
4.0–4.9	10,138	13,129	10,955	11,877	15,817	13,777	13,700	11,544	12,782	11,897	12,216
Total	12,536	15,822	12,635	13,480	17,552	15,336	15,397	13,102	14,589	13,530	13,654

An increase in detected earthquake numbers does not necessarily represent an increase in earthquakes per se. Population increase, habitation spread, and advances in earthquake detection technology all contribute to higher earthquake numbers being recorded over time.

== By death toll ==
Rank	Death toll	Magnitude	Location	MMI	Depth (km)	Date	Event
1	119	7.0	Greece, North Aegean offshore	VIII (Severe)	21.0	30 October	2020 Aegean Sea earthquake
2	44	6.7	Turkey, Elazığ	IX (Violent)	10.0	24 January	2020 Elazığ earthquake
3	10	7.4	Mexico, Oaxaca	IX (Violent)	20.0	23 June	2020 Oaxaca earthquake
3	10	5.8	Iran, West Azarbaijan	VII (Very strong)	10.0	23 February	2020 Iran–Turkey earthquakes

Listed are earthquakes with at least 10 dead.

== By magnitude ==
Rank	Magnitude	Death toll	Location	MMI	Depth (km)	Date	Event
1	7.8	0	United States, Alaska offshore	VII (Very strong)	28.0	22 July	July 2020 Alaska Peninsula earthquake
2	7.7	0	Cayman Islands offshore	VI (Strong)	14.9	28 January	2020 Caribbean earthquake
3	7.6	0	United States, Alaska offshore	VII (Very strong)	28.4	19 October	October 2020 Alaska Peninsula earthquake
4	7.5	1	Russia, Kuril Islands offshore	V (Moderate)	56.7	25 March	–
5	7.4	10	Mexico, Oaxaca	IX (Violent)	20.0	23 June	2020 Oaxaca earthquake
5	7.4	0	New Zealand, Kermadec Islands offshore	VII (Very strong)	10.0	18 June	–
7	7.0	119	Greece, North Aegean offshore	VIII (Severe)	21.0	30 October	2020 Aegean Sea earthquake
7	7.0	1	Papua New Guinea, Oro offshore	VII (Very strong)	73.0	17 July	–
7	7.0	0	Russia, Kuril Islands offshore	VI (Strong)	144.0	13 February	–

Listed are earthquakes with at least 7.0 magnitude.

== By month ==
=== January ===
January
- Strongest: 7.7 M_{w} Cayman Islands
- Deadliest: 6.7 M_{w} Turkey; 41 deaths
- Total fatalities: 46

Number by magnitude
- 8.0–8.9: 0
- 7.0–7.9: 1
- 6.0–6.9: 14
- 5.0–5.9: 144
- 4.0–4.9: 1,217

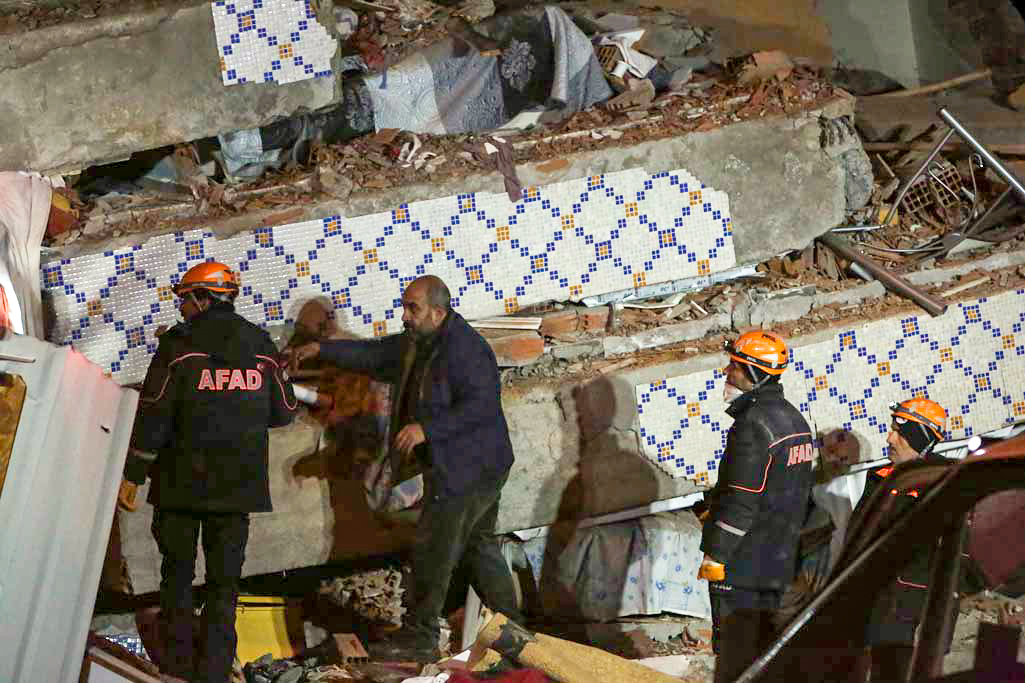
The moment people were being rescued under the rubble after the earthquake in Elazığ, Turkey.

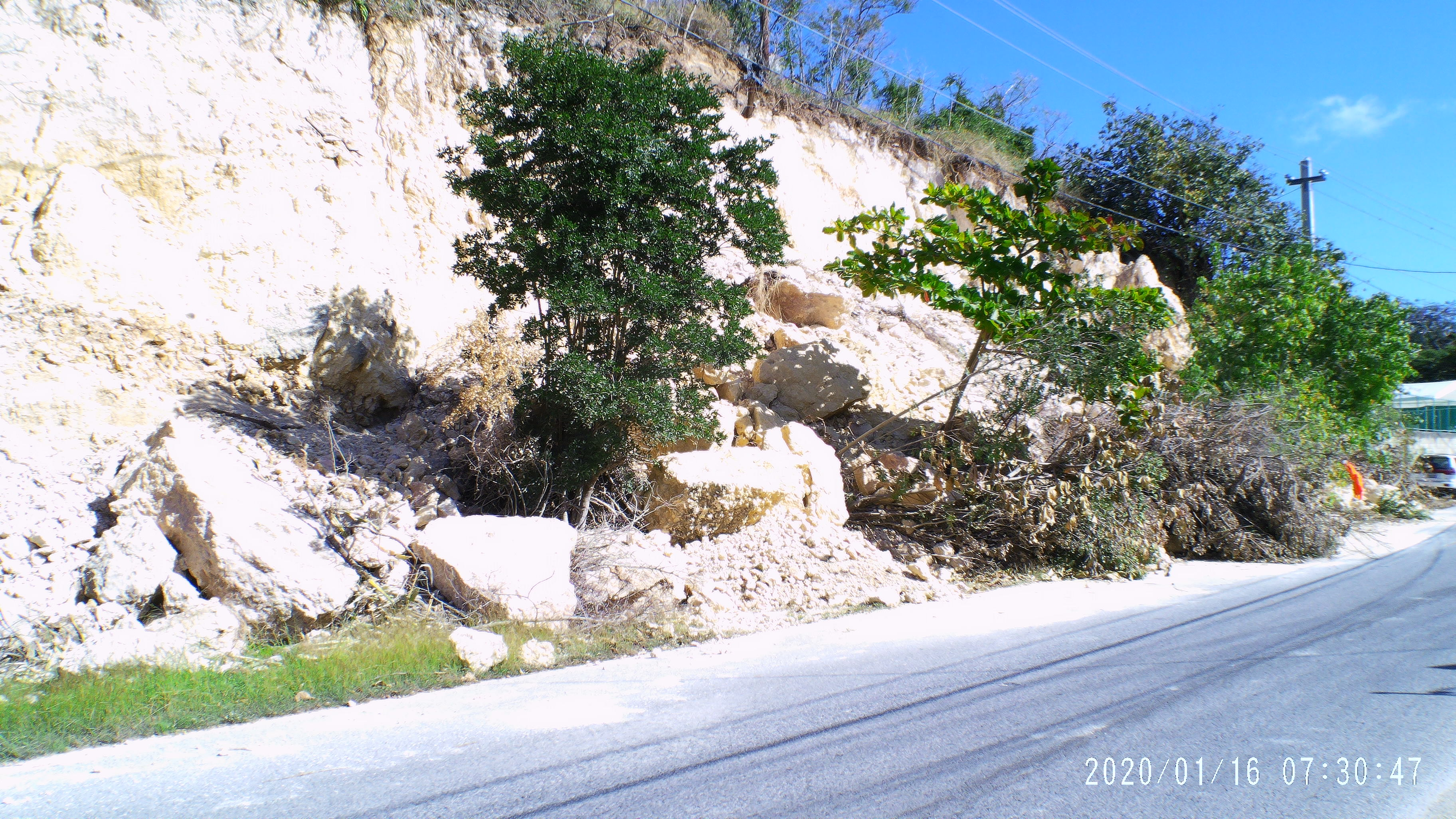
Landslides after the Puerto Rico earthquake.

Date	Country and location	M_{w}	Depth (km)	MMI	Notes	Casualties	
Date	Country and location	M_{w}	Depth (km)	MMI	Notes	Dead	Injured
2	Iran, Khorasan-e Razavi, 81 km southwest of Taybad	5.5	10.0	VII	At least 100 houses were damaged, some of them seriously.	–	–
5	Mexico, Oaxaca, 3 km west of Reforma de Pineda	5.9	87.0	V	Some homes suffered minor damage.	-	-
6	Puerto Rico, Guayanilla offshore, 14 km south of Indios	5.8	6.0	VI	Further information: 2019–20 Puerto Rico earthquakes	-	-
7	Indonesia, Aceh offshore, 14 km south of Sinabang	6.3	17.0	VI	Cracks in walls or broken windows were observed in some buildings in Sinabang.	-	-
7	Puerto Rico, Guayanilla offshore, 13 km south of María Antonia	6.4	9.0	VIII	Further information: 2019–20 Puerto Rico earthquakes	3	8
7	Papua New Guinea, East New Britain, 130 km east northeast of Kimbe	6.0	117.0	IV	–	–	–
8	Iran, Bushehr, 13 km southeast of Borajzan	4.9	10.0	VI	Some damage was caused and seven people were injured. This earthquake struck near the Bushehr nuclear plant, but did not damage it.	–	7
9	Russia, Chukotka Autonomous Okrug, 341 km northeast of Tilichiki	6.4	10.0	VII	–	–	–
10	Puerto Rico, Guánica offshore, 4 km south of María Antonia	5.2	9.0	VI	Further information: 2019–20 Puerto Rico earthquakes	1	–
11	Puerto Rico, , Guayanilla offshore, 5 km southeast of María Antonia	5.9	5.0	VII	Further information: 2019–20 Puerto Rico earthquakes	–	–
12	Philippines, Calabarzon, 3 km south southwest of Talisay	4.7	10.0	–	It was the first of the three largest earthquakes in a swarm related to the eruption of the Taal Volcano. Several houses were damaged in Lemery.	–	–
15	Argentina, Mendoza, 17 km north northwest of San Martín	4.5	40.0	III	Light damage was observed in the city of Mendoza. One person fainted from fear during a live TV show.	–	1
17	Mexico, Oaxaca, 6 km northeast of Ixtepec	5.2	17.5	VI	Various adobe houses and a church were damaged. The earthquake also caused some landslides and falling rocks blocked roads.	–	–
18	Indonesia, Papua, 146 km west of Abepura	6.0	44.0	VI	-	-	-
19	China, Xinjiang, 104 km east northeast of Kashgar	6.0	5.6	VIII	Further information: 2020 Kashgar earthquake	1	2
19	Indonesia, North Sulawesi offshore, 108 km southeast of Gorontalo	6.1	121.7	IV	–	–	–
19	United States, Kansas, 2 km west of South Hutchinson	4.5	5.0	VI	There were reports of bricks breaking off chimneys and sidewalks cracking in the Hutchinson area.	–	–
20	South Georgia and the South Sandwich Islands offshore, 25 km south southeast of Bristol Island	6.1	93.0	V	–	–	–
22	Turkey, Manisa, 15 km east southeast of Kırkağaç	5.6	5.6	VII	A few structures collapsed, with people running outside for safety. Four people were injured. The earthquake was felt in Istanbul and İzmir.	–	4
23	United States, Alaska offshore, Aleutian Islands, 84 km west of Adak	6.2	10.0	VI	–	–	–
24	Turkey, Elazığ, 13 km north of Doğanyol	6.7	10.0	IX	Further information: 2020 Elazığ earthquake	41	1,631
26	United States, Alaska offshore, Aleutian Islands, 240 km west southwest of Adak	6.1	17.0	V	It was an aftershock of the 6.2 quake two days prior.	–	–
27	Solomon Islands, Makira-Ulawa offshore, 102 km west northwest of Kirakira	6.3	21.0	VI	–	–	–
28	Cayman Islands offshore, 123 km north northwest of Lucea, Jamaica	7.7	14.9	VI	Further information: 2020 Caribbean earthquake	–	–
28	Cayman Islands, Grand Cayman offshore, 55 km southeast of East End	6.1	10.0	V	It was an aftershock of the 7.7 earthquake a few hours earlier.	–	–
29	Solomon Islands, Makira-Ulawa offshore, 70 km west of Kirakira	6.0	85.0	V	It was an aftershock of the 6.3 quake two days prior.	–	–

=== February ===
February
- Strongest: 7.0 M_{w} Russia
- Deadliest: 5.8 M_{w} Iran Turkey; 10 deaths
- Total fatalities: 10

Number by magnitude
- 8.0–8.9: 0
- 7.0–7.9: 1
- 6.0–6.9: 6
- 5.0–5.9: 97
- 4.0–4.9: 900

Date	Country and location	M_{w}	Depth (km)	MMI	Notes	Casualties	
Date	Country and location	M_{w}	Depth (km)	MMI	Notes	Dead	Injured
5	Indonesia, East Java offshore, 113 km north northeast of Bangkalan	6.2	592.4	I	–	–	–
6	Indonesia, North Sulawesi offshore, 13 km south of Miangas	6.0	19.0	IV	–	–	–
8	India, Uttarakhand, 29 km northeast of Bageshwar	4.7	18.8	IV	Some houses were damaged, and one collapsed in Bageshwar district. Two people were injured by the rubble.	–	2
8	South Georgia and the South Sandwich Islands offshore, 113 km south southeast of Bristol Island	6.0	16.0	III	–	–	–
9	Papua New Guinea, East New Britain offshore, 127 km south of Kokopo	6.1	34.0	VI	–	–	–
13	Russia, Kuril Islands offshore, 95 km east northeast of Kurilsk	7.0	143.0	VI	–	–	–
16	Iran, Ardabil, 12 km south southeast of Ardabil	4.3	10.0	–	Some damage was caused, and 27 people were injured.	–	27
23	Iran, West Azerbaijan, 30 km southeast of Salmas	5.8	10.0	VII	Further information: 2020 Iran–Turkey earthquakes	10	141
23	Iran, West Azerbaijan, 37 km east southeast of Özalp, Turkey	6.0	10.0	VII	Further information: 2020 Iran–Turkey earthquakes	–	–
24	Italy, Calabria, 2 km east of San Vincenzo La Costa	4.8	10.0	VI	Various buildings were damaged and one collapsed in Cosenza province. One person was injured during a religious office by falling bricks.	–	1
25	Turkey, Malatya, 21 km northeast of Doganyol	5.0	10.0	IV	Minor damage was caused, and six people suffered injuries.	–	6
26	Indonesia, Maluku offshore, 273 km southwest of Tual	6.0	54.0	V	–	–	–

=== March ===
March
- Strongest: 7.5 M_{w} Russia
- Deadliest: 5.3 M_{w} Croatia; 1 death 7.5 M_{w} Russia; 1 death
- Total fatalities: 2

Number by magnitude
- 8.0–8.9: 0
- 7.0–7.9: 1
- 6.0–6.9: 8
- 5.0–5.9: 111
- 4.0–4.9: 960

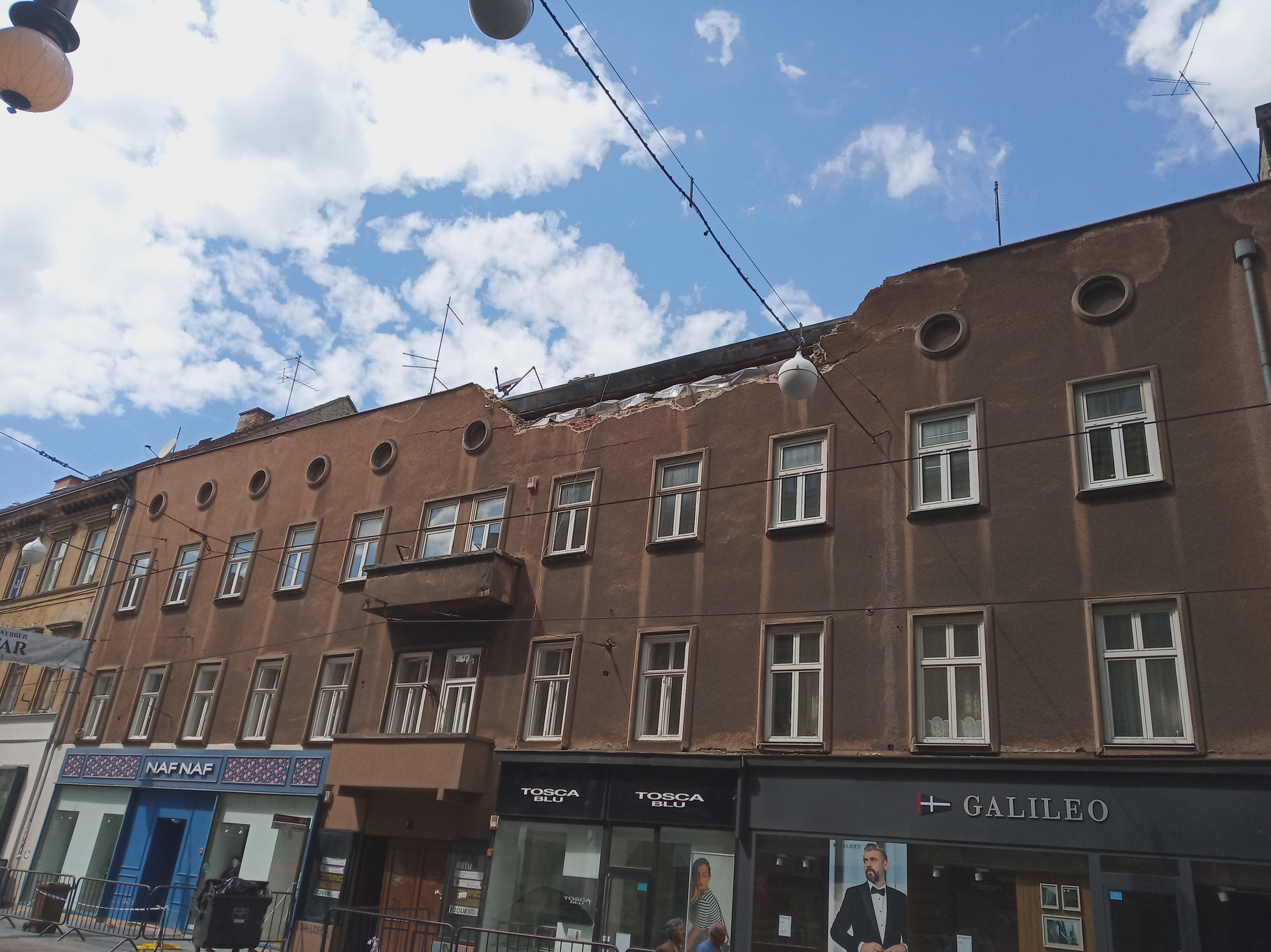
A building in Ilica Street, Zagreb damaged by the earthquake of 22 March 2020.

Date	Country and location	M_{w}	Depth (km)	MMI	Notes	Casualties	
Date	Country and location	M_{w}	Depth (km)	MMI	Notes	Dead	Injured
1	Philippines, Eastern Visayas offshore, 6 km north northwest of Guindapunan	5.4	10.0	VI	Many buildings were damaged in Leyte. Five schools were damaged in the town of Capoocan, causing class suspensions.	–	–
4	Myanmar, Sagaing, 116 km west of Bhamo	4.8	10.0	–	Religious buildings were damaged.	–	–
6	China, Sichuan	3.9	13.0	–	Minor damage was observed in the epicentral area.	–	–
6	Southwest Indian Ridge	6.0	10.0	–	–	–	–
7	Mexico, Baja California offshore, 71 km southeast of Estación Coahuila	5.5	10.0	VII	Minor damage were observed, such as falling objects and rockfalls.	–	–
7	Portugal, Madeira offshore, 27 km south of Caniço	5.3	10.0	V	Minor damage was reported in Funchal, like cracks in walls and fallen plaster. At least three roads were partially blocked by landslides.	–	–
10	Indonesia, West Java, 11 km west of Cicurug	5.0	10.0	VI	Around 90 houses were damaged in Sukabumi, and two people were slightly injured.	–	2
12	Japan, Ishikawa, 26 km north northwest of Nanao	5.3	10.0	VII	One person was injured after suffering a fall during the quake.	–	1
14	New Zealand, Kermadec Islands offshore, 298 km northeast of Raoul Island	6.4	10.0	III	–	–	–
15	Iran, Hormozgan, 94 km northwest of Bandar Abbas	5.4	10.0	VI	Minor damage was caused to many buildings and one partially collapsed in Hormozgan province. Two people were injured.	–	2
17	Tonga, Niuatoputapu offshore, 171 km east of Hihifo	6.0	10.0	IV	Samoa was shaken, although the epicentre was in Tonga.	–	–
18	Vanuatu, Torba offshore, 99 km northwest of Sola	6.1	176.0	IV	–	–	–
18	United States, Utah, 5 km north northeast of Magna	5.7	11.9	VII	Further information: 2020 Salt Lake City earthquake	–	Several
18	Indonesia, Bali offshore, 249 km south of Nusa Dua	6.2	20.7	VI	–	–	–
20	China, Tibet, 85 km northeast of Lobujya, Nepal	5.7	10.0	VII	More than 300 buildings were damaged, affecting 67 villages. At least 2,855 people were evacuated.	–	–
20	Mongolia, Govi-Altai, 178 km southwest of Altai	5.5	10.0	VII	Minor damage was caused to many structures, including a government building.	–	–
21	Greece, Epirus, 14 km north northeast of Kanallaki	5.7	10.0	VII	Some old buildings were damaged and some also collapsed in Kanallaki. Three people were slightly injured.	–	3
22	Croatia, Zagreb, 5 km east of Gornja Bistra	5.3	10.0	VII	Further information: 2020 Zagreb earthquake	1	26
22	Central East Pacific Rise	6.1	10.0	–	–	–	–
25	Russia, Kuril Islands offshore, 221 km south southeast of Severo-Kurilsk	7.5	57.8	V	Following this earthquake, tsunami warnings were issued at first, but were later rescinded, with tsunami heights of 0.5 m observed in Severo-Kurilsk. One person died, trying to evacuate from the tsunami.	1	-
26	Philippines, Soccksargen offshore, 27 km southwest of Burias	6.1	59.0	VI	Some minor damage was observed, like cracks in walls.	–	–
28	Indonesia, Central Sulawesi, 73 km west southwest of Poso	5.9	10.0	VII	At least three people were injured. 33 houses and several public facilities were damaged. Power outage was reported in some affected areas.	–	3
31	United States, Idaho, 31 km north northwest of Stanley	6.5	12.1	VIII	Further information: 2020 Central Idaho earthquake	–	–

=== April ===
April
- Strongest: 6.6 M_{w} Japan

Number by magnitude
- 8.0–8.9: 0
- 7.0–7.9: 0
- 6.0–6.9: 7
- 5.0–5.9: 99
- 4.0–4.9: 1,006

Date	Country and location	M_{w}	Depth (km)	MMI	Notes	Casualties	
Date	Country and location	M_{w}	Depth (km)	MMI	Notes	Dead	Injured
1	China, Qinghai, 274 km northeast of Qamdo	5.4	10.0	VII	Some houses were damaged in Serxu.	–	–
5	Indonesia, North Maluku offshore, 124 km west-northwest of Ternate	6.0	42.0	V	–	–	–
12	French Southern and Antarctic Lands offshore, 96 km north of Amsterdam Island	6.1	10.0	IV	–	–	–
14	New Zealand, Kermadec Islands offshore, 194 km southeast of Raoul Island	6.0	31.0	–	–	–	–
15	Colombia, Bolívar, 13 km north northeast of Pinillos	5.7	53.0	V	Some old houses sustained damage in Cesar Department. In Magdalena, three houses collapsed and one child was slightly injured.	–	1
16	Italy, Emilia-Romagna, 2 km southeast of Marsaglia	4.5	10.0	V	Some damage was caused in Cerignale. Various buildings sustained cracks in walls, and a church was slightly damaged.	-	-
16	Honduras, Bay Islands offshore, 59 km north northeast of Savannah Bight	6.1	12.0	V	–	–	–
17	Myanmar, Sagaing, 39 km east southeast of Falam	5.9	10.0	VII	Various buildings were damaged, including several schools, a pagoda, and a fire station.	-	-
17	Greenland, Sermersooq, 27 km north of Tasiilaq	4.6	10.0	–	Some buildings suffered minor damage.	–	–
18	Japan, Bonin Islands offshore, 209 km west of Chichijima	6.6	453.0	IV	–	–	–
19	Japan, Iwate offshore, 31 km southeast of Ōfunato	6.3	38.0	VI	–	–	–
24	Tajikistan, Khatlon, 7 km southwest of Orzu	4.8	10.0	–	Extensive damage was caused in Orzu. This was the strongest of an earthquake swarm.	–	–
25	Papua New Guinea, Bougainville offshore, 140 km south of Panguna	6.1	19.0	IV	–	–	–
30	Indonesia, North Sumatra, 40 km east southeast of Padangsidempuan	5.0	17.1	V	Some buildings, including houses, mosques and schools, were damaged in South Tapanuli.	–	–

=== May ===
May
- Strongest: 6.8 M_{w} Indonesia
- Deadliest: 5.2 M_{w} China; 4 deaths
- Total fatalities: 6

Number by magnitude
- 8.0–8.9: 0
- 7.0–7.9: 0
- 6.0–6.9: 9
- 5.0–5.9: 108
- 4.0–4.9: 1,113

Date	Country and location	M_{w}	Depth (km)	MMI	Notes	Casualties	
Date	Country and location	M_{w}	Depth (km)	MMI	Notes	Dead	Injured
1	Bulgaria, Plovdiv, 6 km southwest of Rakovski	4.5	10.0	V	Structural damage such as collapsed chimneys, falling plaster, and cracks on walls were observed in Plovdiv.	–	–
2	Puerto Rico, Peñuelas offshore, 6 km south of Tallaboa community	5.4	9.0	VII	Some buildings were partially damaged in Ponce, and power was cut in various cities.	–	–
2	Greece, Crete offshore, 91 km south of Néa Anatolí	6.5	10.0	VI	A tsunami warning was issued, and a small tsunami of 20 cm was measured in Ierapetra. Some landslides were observed along the roads.	–	–
6	Iran, Lorestan, 10 km west northwest of Aleshtar	4.8	10.0	V	Some structures were damaged, and 25 people sustained light injuries.	–	25
6	Indonesia, Maluku offshore, 205 km northwest of Saumlaki	6.8	96.0	VI	–	–	–
7	Papua New Guinea, Bougainville offshore, 215 km north northwest of Arawa	6.1	471.2	II	–	–	–
7	Iran, Tehran, 3 km north northwest of Damavand	4.6	10.0	V	Some minor damage was caused in the capital Tehran. A person in Damavand died of a head injury, while another died in Tehran of a heart attack. 38 others were injured.	2	38
12	Solomon Islands, Santa Cruz Islands offshore, 175 km south southeast of Lata	6.6	107.0	VI	–	–	–
15	United States, Nevada, 33 km southeast of Mina	6.5	2.7	VIII	Further information: 2020 Nevada earthquake	–	–
18	Sweden, Lapland, 3 km south southeast of Kiruna	4.9	1.0	VII	It was the most powerful earthquake to hit Sweden in 12 years. It caused some rockslides in Kiruna Mine, which had to be evacuated.	–	–
18	China, Yunnan, 42 km west of Zhaotong	5.1	10.0	VI	Further information: 2020 Qiaojia earthquake	4	28
22	Mexico, Baja California Sur offshore, 173 km east southeast of San José del Cabo	6.1	10.0	IV	–	–	–
23	Philippines, Central Luzon, 14 km south of Suklayin	5.2	43.5	IV	A supermarket and a government building were damaged. One person was injured after he suffered a fall during the quake.	–	1
24	Iran, Kohgiluyeh and Boyer-Ahmad, 3 km north northwest of Dogonbadan	4.9	10.0	VI	Serious damage occurred in the historical city of Dehdasht, and 16 people were injured.	–	16
27	Vanuatu, Shefa offshore, 51 km west northwest of Port-Vila	6.2	9.7	V	–	–	–
28	Tonga, ʻEua offshore, 111 km south southeast of 'Ohonua	6.0	10.0	IV	–	–	–
31	Peru, Puno, 19 km southwest of Vilavila	6.1	186.0	IV	–	–	–

=== June ===
June
- Strongest: 7.4 M_{w} Mexico; 7.4 M_{w} New Zealand
- Deadliest: 7.4 M_{w} Mexico; 10 deaths
- Total fatalities: 12

Number by magnitude
- 8.0–8.9: 0
- 7.0–7.9: 2
- 6.0–6.9: 9
- 5.0–5.9: 118
- 4.0–4.9: 1101

Date	Country and location	M_{w}	Depth (km)	MMI	Notes	Casualties	
Date	Country and location	M_{w}	Depth (km)	MMI	Notes	Dead	Injured
3	Chile, Antofagasta, 48 km southwest of San Pedro de Atacama	6.8	112.0	VI	A church collapsed in Camar, Antofagasta and moderate damage was caused in San Pedro de Atacama.	–	–
3	Fiji offshore, south of the Fiji Islands	6.0	69.8	–	–	–	–
3	Indonesia, Aceh offshore, 23 km northwest of Banda Aceh	4.6	10.0	V	Some buildings were damaged in Sabang, with collapsed walls and roofs.	–	–
4	Indonesia, North Maluku offshore, 133 km north northeast of Tobelo	6.4	112.9	V	More than 300 houses were damaged in Morotai.	–	–
5	Turkey, Malatya, 25 km west southwest of Doğanyol	5.1	10.0	VI	At least 20 buildings suffered damage in Pütürge following the quake, two of them severely.	–	–
7	Peru, Ancash offshore, 33 km west southwest of Puerto Casma	4.5	57.2	III	A young man died of a heart attack in a panic during the evacuation.	1	–
9	Iran, Fars, 56 km northeast of Mohr	5.7	10.0	VII	Eighty buildings were damaged by the earthquake, three of them severely. One person was slightly injured.	–	1
10	Saint Helena, Ascension and Tristan da Cunha offshore, 783 km west of Jamestown	6.0	10.0	–	–	–	–
13	Japan, Ryukyu Islands offshore, 130 km west northwest of Naze	6.6	165.0	IV	–	–	–
13	Northern Mariana Islands, Agrihan offshore, 420 km north of Saipan	6.2	622.0	II	–	–	–
14	Turkey, Bingöl, 14 km east of Yedisu	5.9	10.0	VII	Further information: 2020 Bingöl earthquake	1	35
14	India, Gujarat, 9 km north of Bhachau	5.1	10.0	VI	Cracks appeared on some houses in Chotila, while in Bhachau, the roof of a building collapsed.	–	–
16	Vietnam, Lai Châu, 100 km north northeast of Phôngsali, Laos	4.5	10.0	V	In Lai Châu, a ceiling in a nursery school partially collapsed and fell on a group of children who were sleeping when the quake hit. Four of them suffered minor injuries.	–	4
18	New Zealand, Kermadec Islands offshore, 683 km northeast of Opotiki	7.4	10.0	VII	A tsunami warning was issued, then cancelled, with waves of 12 cm (4.7 in) hitting Korotiti Bay, Great Barrier Island.	–	–
21	Iceland, Northeastern region offshore, 27 km north northeast of Siglufjörður	6.0	10.0	V	–	–	–
21	India, Mizoram, 22 km east of North Vanlaiphai	5.6	10.8	VII	Several buildings and a church were damaged in Champhai district.	–	–
23	Indonesia, Gorontalo offshore, 97 km southeast of Gorontalo	6.0	109.0	IV	–	–	–
23	Mexico, Oaxaca, 9 km southeast of Santa María Xadani	7.4	20.0	IX	Further information: 2020 Oaxaca earthquake	10	23
24	United States, California, 18 km south southeast of Lone Pine	5.8	4.7	VIII	The earthquake triggered rockslides near the main parking lot in Whitney Portal.	–	–
24	Japan, Chiba offshore, 36 km southeast of Hasaki	5.9	29.1	V	Two people were injured.	–	2
25	Turkey, Van, 14 km south southwest of Özalp	5.4	10.0	VI	Around 15 houses sustained damage, and five people were hospitalized with light injuries.	–	5
25	China, Tibet, 278 km southeast of Hotan	6.3	10.0	VIII	–	–	–

=== July ===
July
- Strongest: 7.8 M_{w} United States
- Deadliest: 7.0 M_{w} Papua New Guinea; 1 death
- Total fatalities: 1

Number by magnitude
- 8.0–8.9: 0
- 7.0–7.9: 2
- 6.0–6.9: 9
- 5.0–5.9: 91
- 4.0–4.9: 1,091

Date	Country and location	M_{w}	Depth (km)	MMI	Notes	Casualties	
Date	Country and location	M_{w}	Depth (km)	MMI	Notes	Dead	Injured
3	Puerto Rico, Lajas offshore, 9 km south southeast of La Parguera	5.3	3.0	VI	Further information: 2019–20 Puerto Rico earthquakes	–	–
4	Tajikistan, Districts under Central Government Jurisdiction, 47 km east of Rasht	5.4	10.0	VI	Dozens of houses were damaged in the Tojikobod District, including at least ten in the village of Shrinchashma.	–	–
6	Micronesia, Yap offshore, 257 km north of Fais	6.2	10.0	III	–	–	–
6	Indonesia, Java offshore, 98 km north of Batang	6.6	533.8	II	Some houses were damaged in Raguklampitan village.	–	–
11	China, Hebei, 1 km east northeast of Zhaogezhuang	4.8	10.0	VI	Cracks appeared in old buildings and rail services were suspended.	–	–
17	Papua New Guinea, Oro offshore, 114 km north northwest of Popondetta	7.0	73.0	VII	A tsunami warning was issued. A dozen homes were damaged and some collapsed in Sohe District. One woman was killed by a landslide and another injured when her home collapsed.	1	1
17	Chile, Tarapacá, 3 km southeast of Iquique	5.9	73.6	VII	Power outages and rockslides was observed in Pica.	–	–
17	India, Andaman Islands offshore, 239 km east of Port Blair	6.1	10.0	III	–	–	–
18	Tonga, Niuatoputapu offshore, 141 km east northeast of Hihifo	6.1	12.0	IV	–	–	–
21	Fiji, Lau offshore	6.0	605.2	–	–	–	–
22	United States, Alaska offshore, 99 km south southeast of Perryville	7.8	28.0	VII	Further information: 2021 Chignik earthquake § July 2020	–	–
22	United States, Alaska offshore, 101 km east southeast of Sand Point	6.1	16.5	VI	It was an aftershock of the 7.8 quake a few minutes before.	–	–
22	China, Tibet	6.3	10.0	VII	Fourteen buildings were damaged in the quake. There was also damage to eight uninhabited buildings and two public buildings.	–	–
26	South Georgia and the South Sandwich Islands offshore, South Sandwich Islands region	6.4	10.0	III	–	–	–
27	Vietnam, Sơn La, 120 km west of Hanoi	4.9	10.0	VI	At least 126 buildings were damaged in five towns near the epicenter, and some partially collapsed.	–	–
27	Philippines, Caraga, 3 km north of La Paz	5.8	43.4	V	In Talacogon, a wall of a residential building collapsed. In San Francisco, the ceiling of a mall fell.	–	–
28	United States, Alaska offshore, 75 km southwest of Sand Point	6.1	35.2	V	It was an aftershock of the 7.8 quake on 22 July.	–	–

=== August ===
August
- Strongest: 6.9 M_{w} Indonesia; Two events
- Deadliest: 6.6 M_{w} Philippines; 2 deaths
- Total fatalities: 3

Number by magnitude
- 8.0–8.9: 0
- 7.0–7.9: 0
- 6.0–6.9: 15
- 5.0–5.9: 123
- 4.0–4.9: 721

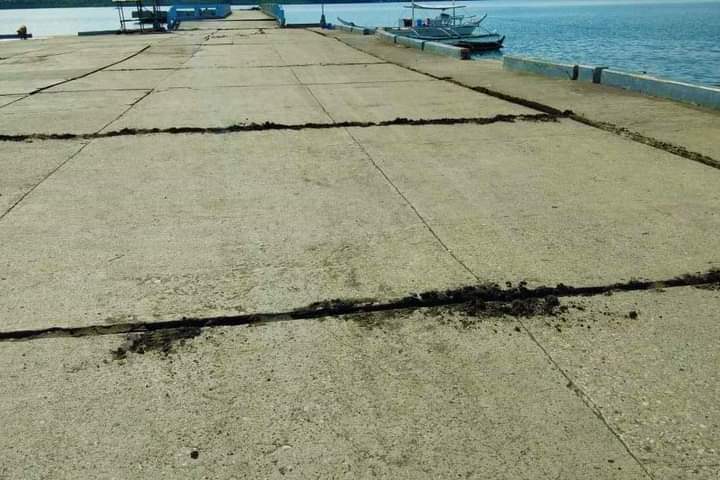
Damage to a port in Cataingan after the deadly Masbate earthquake.

Date	Country and location	M_{w}	Depth (km)	MMI	Notes	Casualties	
Date	Country and location	M_{w}	Depth (km)	MMI	Notes	Dead	Injured
1	Philippines, Bangsamoro offshore, 11 km southwest of Polloc	6.4	483.0	III	-	–	–
1	Papua New Guinea offshore, Bismarck Sea, 199 km southeast of Lorengau	6.1	10.0	IV	–	–	–
4	Turkey, Adiyaman, 18 km northeast of Sincik	5.6	10.0	VII	Around five houses were destroyed in Malatya. It was an aftershock of the 2020 Elazig earthquake.	–	–
5	Vanuatu, Malampa offshore, 69 km east of Lakatoro	6.4	181.9	IV	–	–	–
6	South Africa offshore, Prince Edward Islands region	6.3	10.0	–	–	–	–
7	Puerto Rico, Guayanilla, 2 km south southeast of Magas Arriba	4.8	12.0	VI	Further information: 2019–20 Puerto Rico earthquakes	–	–
7	Algeria, Mila, 3 km north northeast of Sidi Merouane	5.0	10.0	VII	At least three homes were completely destroyed, and 31 residential buildings and a road suffered minor damage. No injuries were reported.	–	–
7	Turkey, Siirt, 3 km south southeast of Beğendik	4.8	15.1	–	There were reports of cracks on walls of some masonry houses in Hizan.	–	–
9	United States, North Carolina, 4 km southeast of Sparta	5.1	4.1	VII	Further information: 2020 Sparta earthquake	–	1
12	Tanzania, Pwani offshore, 66 km north northeast of Kilindoni	6.0	17.6	V	Some damage, like cracked walls and broken windows, were reported in some buildings.	–	–
14	Pakistan, Balochistan, 57 km southwest of Surab	5.6	14.0	VI	Around 300 houses were destroyed in the earthquake, affecting around 700 people.	–	–
18	Philippines, Eastern Visayas offshore, 13 km east of San Pedro	6.6	10.0	VIII	Further information: 2020 Masbate earthquake	2	170
18	Indonesia, Sumatra offshore, 138 km west southwest of Bengkulu	6.8	22.0	IV	This pair of similarly sized earthquakes in a few minutes can be considered as a doublet earthquake.	–	–
18	Indonesia, Sumatra offshore, 122 km west southwest of Bengkulu	6.9	26.0	IV	This pair of similarly sized earthquakes in a few minutes can be considered as a doublet earthquake.	–	–
21	Indonesia offshore, Banda Sea, 222 km south southeast of Katabu	6.9	624.0	III	–	–	–
24	Costa Rica, Puntarenas, 4 km south southwest of Jacó	6.0	20.0	V	–	–	–
25	Papua New Guinea, East New Britain, 141 km south southwest of Kokopo	6.0	23.0	VI	This pair of similarly sized earthquakes in a few minutes can be considered as a doublet earthquake.	–	–
25	Papua New Guinea, East New Britain, 141 km south southwest of Kokopo	6.2	22.0	VI	This pair of similarly sized earthquakes in a few minutes can be considered as a doublet earthquake.	–	–
29	Iran, Semnan, 26 km north of Damghan	4.0	10.0	IV	No damage was reported, but one person died of a heart attack.	1	–
30	Brazil, Bahia, 6 km south southwest of Mutuípe	4.6	10.0	VI	It was the strongest earthquake in the state of Bahia in the last 30 years. At least 22 houses were damaged.	–	–
30	Central Mid-Atlantic Ridge	6.5	10.0	V	–	–	–
31	British Indian Ocean Territory offshore, Chagos Archipelago region	6.1	10.0	IV	–	–	–

=== September ===
September
- Strongest: 6.9 M_{w}, central Mid-Atlantic Ridge
- Total fatalities: 0

Number by magnitude
- 8.0–8.9: 0
- 7.0–7.9: 0
- 6.0–6.9: 14
- 5.0–5.9: 105
- 4.0–4.9: 743

Date	Country and location	M_{w}	Depth (km)	MMI	Notes	Casualties	
Date	Country and location	M_{w}	Depth (km)	MMI	Notes	Dead	Injured
1	Chile, Atacama offshore, 86 km northwest of Vallenar	6.8	21.0	VII	Some damage was observed in the city of Copiapó, near the epicenter.	–	–
1	Chile, Atacama offshore, 78 km northwest of Vallenar	6.3	16.2	VI	It was an aftershock of the 6.8 quake one hour earlier.	–	–
1	Chile, Atacama offshore, 94 km northwest of Vallenar	6.5	16.0	VI	It was an aftershock of the 6.8 quake a few hours earlier.	–	–
4	Japan, Fukui, 2 km northwest of Fukui-shi	4.6	10.0	V	Some damage was caused, and 13 people sustained minor injuries.	–	13
4	India, Maharashtra	4.0	5.0	–	At least one house collapsed and several others were damaged in Palghar district.	–	–
4	Chile, Coquimbo, 40 km northwest of Ovalle	6.3	30.0	VI	–	–	–
6	Vanuatu, Shefa offshore, 104 km northwest of Port-Vila	6.2	10.0	IV	–	–	–
6	Central Mid-Atlantic Ridge	6.7	10.0	–	–	–	–
6	Philippines, Davao offshore, 25 km east of Talagutong	6.3	120.0	IV	–	–	–
6	Iran, Golestan, 13 km south southwest of Azadshahr	5.3	10.0	VI	The quake caused damage to 50 houses in the region. At least 34 people were injured.	–	34
7	Vanuatu, Shefa offshore, 72 km north northeast of Port-Vila	6.2	10.0	VI	It was an aftershock of the 6.2 quake the day before.	–	–
7	Indonesia, Talaud Islands offhsore, 188 km southeast of Sarangani, Philippines	5.7	17.0	V	At least 27 homes and four religious buildings suffered minor damage, and some walls collapsed. Two people were injured by falling debris.	–	2
11	Chile, Tarapacá, 82 km north northeast of Tocopilla	6.2	51.0	VII	Some houses were damaged, and one person was slightly injured.	–	1
12	Japan, Iwate offshore, 58 km southeast of Ōfunato	6.1	34.0	IV	–	–	–
13	Indonesia, West Sulawesi, 76 km northeast of Mamuju	4.8	25.6	–	Some houses were destroyed, and several people were injured by falling debris.	–	Several
15	Russia, Kamchatka, 21 km west of Esso	6.4	344.0	III	–	–	–
15	Nepal, Bagmati, 14 km southwest of Kodari	5.3	10.0	V	Several houses collapsed in the Kathmandu area, and one person was injured after fleeing in panic.	–	1
18	Central Mid-Atlantic Ridge	6.9	10.0	III	–	–	–
19	United States, California, 3 km southwest of South El Monte	4.5	16.9	VI	Some damage was observed in Los Angeles, such as cracks in walls.	–	–
26	Turkmenistan, Balkan, 88 km southwest of Serdar	5.2	10.0	III	Eighty homes were damaged and power outages occurred in Northern Iran.	–	–
26	south of Africa	6.1	10.0	–	–	–	–

=== October ===
October
- Strongest: 7.6 M_{w} United States
- Deadliest: 7.0 M_{w} Greece; 119 deaths
- Total fatalities: 120

Number by magnitude
- 8.0–8.9: 0
- 7.0–7.9: 2
- 6.0–6.9: 6
- 5.0–5.9: 133
- 4.0–4.9: 861

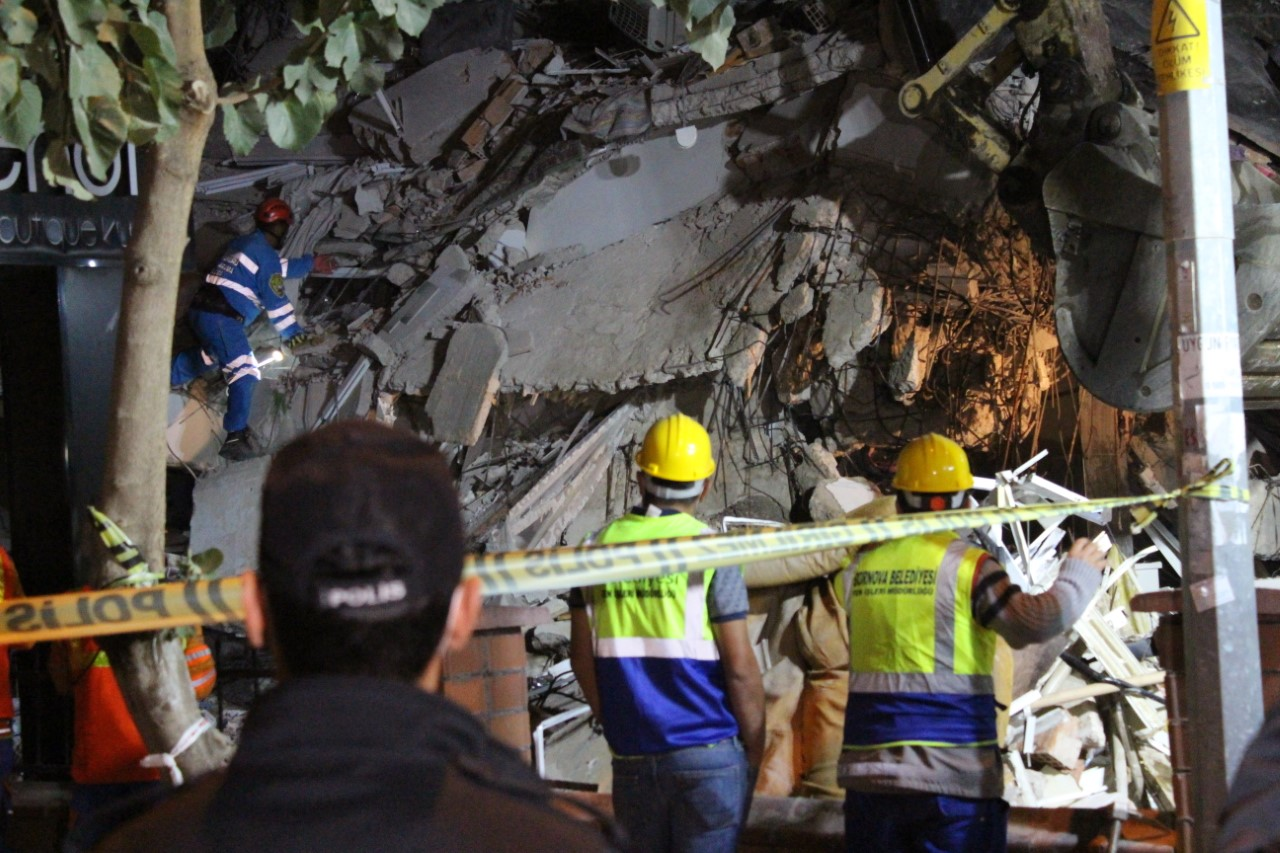
Rescuers search through the rubble of a collapsed apartment after the 2020 Aegean Sea earthquake.

Date	Country and location	M_{w}	Depth (km)	MMI	Notes	Casualties	
Date	Country and location	M_{w}	Depth (km)	MMI	Notes	Dead	Injured
1	Spain, Navarre, 3 km north northeast of Huarte-Uharte	4.4	10.0	IV	Some houses suffered slight damage in Pamplona, like cracks in walls or broken windows.	–	–
1	Tonga, Haʻapai offshore, 39 km northeast of Pangai	6.4	28.0	VI	–	–	–
1	Papua New Guinea, West New Britain, 100 km west northwest of Kandrian	6.1	74.0	V	–	–	–
8	Papua New Guinea, Eastern Highlands, 40 km east northeast of Kainantu	6.3	106.0	V	–	–	–
17	Russia, Kemerovo Oblast, 1 km south of Artyshta	4.6	10.0	V	This small earthquake caused a mine collapse in Sheregesh. Two miners were injured.	–	2
19	United States, Alaska offshore, 99 km southeast of Sand Point	7.6	28.4	VII	Further information: 2021 Chignik earthquake § October 2020	–	–
23	Fiji offshore, south of the Fiji Islands	6.1	454.0	III	–	–	–
25	Indonesia, West Java offshore, 72 km south southwest of Kawalu	5.4	43.0	IV	Around ten houses suffered damage, and three people sustained minor injuries.	–	3
27	Indonesia, West Sulawesi offshore, 54 km north northeast of Mamuju	5.4	22.0	VI	Various houses were damaged in Mamuju Regency. A pregnant woman was killed after falling in a panic during the earthquake.	1	–
28	Turkey, Erzincan, 8 km northwest of Tercan	4.5	10.0	–	At least 23 houses were damaged in Çayırlı and Tercan.	–	–
30	Greece, North Aegean offshore, 13 km north northeast of Néon Karlovásion	7.0	21.0	VIII	Further information: 2020 Aegean Sea earthquake	119	1,053

=== November ===
November
- Strongest: 6.4 M_{w} Russia
- Total fatalities: 0

Number by magnitude
- 8.0–8.9: 0
- 7.0–7.9: 0
- 6.0–6.9: 9
- 5.0–5.9: 73
- 4.0–4.9: 659

Date	Country and location	M_{w}	Depth (km)	MMI	Notes	Casualties	
Date	Country and location	M_{w}	Depth (km)	MMI	Notes	Dead	Injured
1	Croatia, Zadar, 2 km northeast of Starigrad	4.6	10.0	VI	There were two instances of wall collapse in Vir. Landslides were also observed in Paklenica.	–	–
3	Chile, Aysén offshore	6.0	10.0	–	–	–	–
7	Tonga, Niuatoputapu offshore, 83 km north northeast of Hihifo	6.2	34.0	IV	–	–	–
8	United States, Massachusetts, 10 km south of Bliss Corner	3.6	10.0	V	Minor damage was observed, such as cracks in walls and collapsed chimneys.	–	–
11	Fiji, Lau offshore, 291 km west northwest of Haveluloto, Tonga	6.0	417.0	III	–	–	–
15	Philippines, Caraga offshore, 5 km south of Marihatag	6.0	43.0	V	Some minor damage was observed in Caraga, like cracks in walls.	–	–
17	Indonesia, West Sumatra offshore, 222 km south southwest of Padang	6.0	19.0	IV	–	–	–
22	Chile, Maule offshore, 100 km northwest of Constitución	6.1	22.0	IV	–	–	–
22	Algeria, Skikda, 24 km west southwest of Azzaba	5.1	10.0	VI	Some houses were damaged in El Harrouch and Aïn Bouziane, including a hospital. Several people were injured.	–	Several
29	Argentina, Salta, 33 km east of Humahuaca	5.8	8.0	VI	The earthquake caused rockslides in this mountainous region. In Caspalá, various adobe houses were badly damaged, and some collapsed.	-	-
30	Russia, Khabarovsk offshore, 88 km south southeast of Sovetskaya Gavan'	6.4	589.0	II	–	–	–
30	Argentina, Salta, 71 km west of San Antonio de los Cobres	6.3	189.0	IV	–	–	–

=== December ===
December
- Strongest: 6.7 M_{w} Chile
- Deadliest: 6.4 M_{w} Croatia; 9 deaths
- Total fatalities: 9

Number by magnitude
- 8.0–8.9: 0
- 7.0–7.9: 0
- 6.0–6.9: 11
- 5.0–5.9: 105
- 4.0–4.9: 723

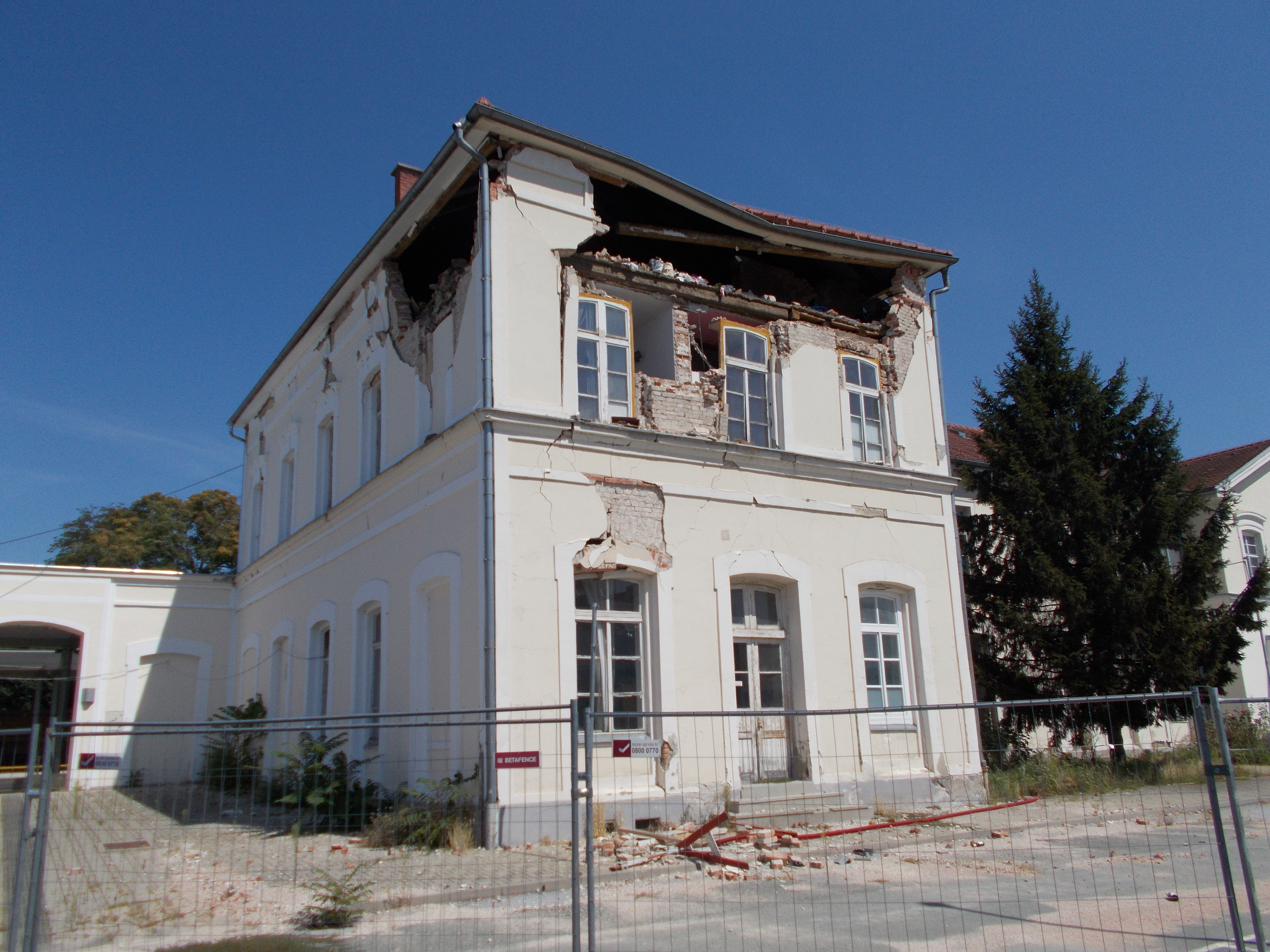
Damaged station building in Sisak, Croatia.

Date	Country and location	M_{w}	Depth (km)	MMI	Notes	Casualties	
Date	Country and location	M_{w}	Depth (km)	MMI	Notes	Dead	Injured
1	United States, Alaska offshore, Aleutian Islands, 46 km east southeast of Nikolski	6.4	23.0	VII	–	–	–
2	Greece, Thiva, 2 km west of Árma	4.5	10.0	VI	A cemetery was completely destroyed in the village of Kallithea, while in the same village a displacement of 6 cm was observed.	–	–
2	Antarctica offshore, Balleny Islands region	6.0	10.0	–	–	–	–
5	Turkey, Antalya offshore, 45 km west southwest of Gazipaşa	5.3	84.5	VI	One person was injured after he jumped out of a window due to panic.	–	1
6	Chile, Tarapacá, 115 km east of Iquique	6.1	105.0	VI	–	–	–
9	Russia, Buryatia, 41 km north of Kabansk	5.4	17.0	VI	More than twenty schools and social facilities suffered minor damage as a result of the earthquake. Cracks were also observed in several homes.	–	–
10	Taiwan, Yilan offshore, 27 km east of Yilan	6.1	71.0	V	–	–	-
10	Indonesia, West Java, 30 km southeast of Karangsembung	4.0	10.0	–	23 homes and two public buildings were damaged in Kuningan.	–	–
14	Chile, Antofagasta, 75 km north northeast of Calama	6.0	114.0	IV	–	–	–
15	Philippines, Davao offshore, 25 km south of Sarangani	6.1	14.0	VI	Some houses sustained cracks in General Santos.	–	–
16	Peru, Arequipa, 2 km south southeast of Quequeña	5.6	90.4	V	Various buildings were damaged in Arequipa Province. Rockslides were also observed, blocking roads.	–	–
20	Japan, Aomori offshore, 100 km east northeast of Hachinohe	6.3	35.0	V	One person was injured in Aomori.	–	1
22	Italy, Sicily, 7 km northwest of Scoglitti	4.5	23.0	V	Several buildings were damaged in Ragusa, including a multi-storey residential building.	–	–
23	Palau, offshore, 90 km southwest of Angaur State	6.1	11.0	IV	–	–	–
24	Philippines, Calabarzon, 2 km east southeast of Calatagan	6.3	109.0	VI	Four (three in Lubang and one in Mariveles) houses were damaged.	–	–
27	Turkey, Elazığ, 7 km west northwest of Sivrice	5.5	9.0	VII	It was an aftershock of the 2020 Elazığ earthquake. Some damage was caused, and 68 people were injured, two of them seriously after jumping from windows in a panic.	–	68
27	Peru, Arequipa offshore, 25 km south southeast of Atiquipa	5.7	39.0	V	Some houses were seriously damaged in Caraveli district, and eight of them had to be evacuated.	–	–
27	Chile, Los Ríos offshore, 141 km west northwest of Corral	6.7	10.0	V	A tsunami was observed with heights of 0.16 m (0.52 ft) in Bahía Mansa.	–	–
28	Croatia, Sisak-Moslavina, 8 km west of Petrinja	4.8	10.0	VI	It was a foreshock of the 6.4 quake the day after. Various buildings were damaged in Petrinja, Glina and Sisak.	–	–
29	Croatia, Sisak-Moslavina, 2 km west southwest of Petrinja	6.4	10.0	IX	Further information: 2020 Petrinja earthquake	9	25

== See also ==
- Lists of earthquakes
- Lists of 21st-century earthquakes
- Lists of earthquakes by year
