= Sadereh =

Sadereh صادره
- Village
- Location within Iran
- Coordinates: 27°31′25″N 52°55′16″E
- Country: Iran
- Province: Fars
- County: Mohr
- Bakhsh: Central
- Rural District: Mohr

Population (2006)
  - Total: 473
- Time zone: UTC+3:30 (IRST)
  - Summer (DST): UTC+4:30 (IRDT)

Sadereh (Persian: صادره, also Romanized as Şādereh; also known as Sādara) is a village in Mohr Rural District, in the Central District of Mohr County, Fars province, Iran. At the 2006 census, its population was 473, in 103 families.
