= Tang Mohr =

Tang Mohr تنگ مهر
- Village
- Location within Iran
- Coordinates: 27°31′10″N 52°51′36″E
- Country: Iran
- Province: Fars
- County: Mohr
- Bakhsh: Central
- Rural District: Mohr

Population (2006)
  - Total: 51
- Time zone: UTC+3:30 (IRST)
  - Summer (DST): UTC+4:30 (IRDT)

Tang Mohr (Persian: تنگ مهر; also known as Tang Mehr-e Jonūbī) is a village in Mohr Rural District, in the Central District of Mohr County, Fars province, Iran. At the 2006 census, its population was 51, in 10 families.
