= Faryab, Mohr =

Faryab فارياب
- Village
- Location within Iran
- Coordinates: 27°29′26″N 52°56′24″E
- Country: Iran
- Province: Fars
- County: Mohr
- Bakhsh: Central
- Rural District: Mohr

Population (2006)
  - Total: 310
- Time zone: UTC+3:30 (IRST)
  - Summer (DST): UTC+4:30 (IRDT)

Faryab (Persian: فارياب, also Romanized as Fāryāb, Fāreyāb, and Fāriāb; also known as Fariyab Varadi and Fāryāb-e Varādī) is a village in Mohr Rural District, in the Central District of Mohr County, Fars province, Iran. At the 2006 census, its population was 310, in 51 families.
