= Qaleh-ye Mohammad Ali =

Qaleh-ye Mohammad Ali or Qaleh Mohammad Ali (Persian: قلعه محمدعلي) may refer to:

- Qaleh-ye Mohammad Ali, Fars
- Qaleh-ye Mohammad Ali, Kermanshah

== See also ==
- Qaleh-ye Mohammad Ali Khan
