= Zighan =

Zighan زيغان
- Village
- Location within Iran
- Coordinates: 27°35′43″N 52°44′27″E
- Country: Iran
- Province: Fars
- County: Mohr
- Bakhsh: Central
- Rural District: Arudan

Population (2006)
  - Total: 456
- Time zone: UTC+3:30 (IRST)
  - Summer (DST): UTC+4:30 (IRDT)

Zighan (Persian: زيغان, also Romanized as Zīghān; also known as Zīqān) is a village in Arudan Rural District, in the Central District of Mohr County, Fars province, Iran. At the 2006 census, its population was 456, in 100 families.
