= Arudan =

Arudan or Aroodan (Persian: ارودان) may refer to:

- Arudan-e Olya
- Arudan-e Sofla
- Arudan Rural District
