= Hajjiabad, Mohr =

Hajjiabad حاجي اباد
- Village
- Location within Iran
- Coordinates: 27°30′29″N 52°56′31″E
- Country: Iran
- Province: Fars
- County: Mohr
- Bakhsh: Central
- Rural District: Mohr

Population (2006)
  - Total: 448
- Time zone: UTC+3:30 (IRST)
  - Summer (DST): UTC+4:30 (IRDT)

Hajjiabad (Persian: حاجي اباد, also Romanized as Ḩājjīābād and Ḩājīābād) is a village in Mohr Rural District, in the Central District of Mohr County, Fars province, Iran. At the 2006 census, its population was 448, in 95 families.
