= Chah Sargahi =

Chah Sargahi چاه سرگاهی
- Village
- Location within Iran
- Coordinates: 27°35′36″N 52°46′25″E
- Country: Iran
- Province: Fars
- County: Mohr
- Bakhsh: Central
- Rural District: Arudan

Population (2006)
  - Total: 410
- Time zone: UTC+3:30 (IRST)
  - Summer (DST): UTC+4:30 (IRDT)

Chah Sargahi (Persian: چاه سرگاهی, also Romanized as Chāh Sargāhī and Chāh-e Sar Gāhī; also known as Chāh-e Saḩargāhī and Sargaya) is a village in Arudan Rural District, in the Central District of Mohr County, Fars province, Iran. At the 2006 census, its population was 410, in 80 families.
