= Nakhelstan-e Mohr =

Nakhelstan-e Mohr نخلستان مهر
- Village
- Country: Iran
- Province: Fars
- County: Mohr
- Bakhsh: Central
- Rural District: Mohr

Population (2006)
  - Total: 20
- Time zone: UTC+3:30 (IRST)
  - Summer (DST): UTC+4:30 (IRDT)

Nakhelstan-e Mohr (Persian: نخلستان مهر, also Romanized as Nakhlestān-e Mohr) is a village in Mohr Rural District, in the Central District of Mohr County, Fars province, Iran. At the 2006 census, its population was 20, in 4 families.
