= Bardeh Kuyeh =

Bardeh Kuyeh برده كويه
- Village
- Location within Iran
- Coordinates: 27°32′05″N 52°57′23″E
- Country: Iran
- Province: Fars
- County: Mohr
- Bakhsh: Central
- Rural District: Mohr

Population (2006)
  - Total: 464
- Time zone: UTC+3:30 (IRST)
  - Summer (DST): UTC+4:30 (IRDT)

Bardeh Kuyeh (Persian: برده كويه, also Romanized as Bardeh Kūyeh; also known as Bard Kooyeh) is a village in Mohr Rural District, in the Central District of Mohr County, Fars province, Iran. At the 2006 census, its population was 464, in 89 families.
