= Tang-e Cheh Zarreh =

Tang-e Cheh Zarreh تنگ چه زره
- Village
- Country: Iran
- Province: Fars
- County: Mohr
- Bakhsh: Central
- Rural District: Mohr

Population (2006)
  - Total: 19
- Time zone: UTC+3:30 (IRST)
  - Summer (DST): UTC+4:30 (IRDT)

Tang-e Cheh Zarreh (Persian: تنگ چه زره) is a village in Mohr Rural District, in the Central District of Mohr County, Fars province, Iran. At the 2006 census, its population was 19, in 4 families.
