= 2020 Oaxaca earthquake =

Earthquake in Mexico

- Location within Oaxaca Location within Mexico
- UTC time: 2020-06-23 15:29:05
- ISC event: 618580119
- USGS-ANSS: ComCat
- Local date: 23 June 2020
- Local time: 10:29 a.m.
- Magnitude: 7.4 M_{w}
- Depth: 20.0 km (12.4 mi)
- Epicenter: 15.932°N 95.937°W
- Type: Thrust
- Areas affected: Mexico, Oaxaca, Mexico City
- Max. intensity: MMI IX (Violent)
- Tsunami: Up to 1.57 m (5.2 ft) in Mazunte
- Casualties: 10 dead 23 injured

An earthquake struck the Mexican state of Oaxaca at 10:29 local time on June 23, 2020, with a magnitude of 7.4 M_{w}. The epicenter was 19 miles (31 km) from San Miguel del Puerto and 7.5 miles (12.1 km) south-southwest of Santa María Zapotitlán. The quake was felt by an estimated 49 million people in Mexico and Guatemala, with some tremors felt as far away as 640 kilometers (400 mi). Thousands of houses in Oaxaca were damaged and 10 deaths were reported. A tsunami warning was issued for southern Mexico, El Salvador, Guatemala, and Honduras.

== Tectonic setting ==
Oaxaca lies above the convergent boundary where the Cocos plate is being subducted beneath the North American plate. The rate of convergence in this part of the boundary is 60 mm per year. This boundary is associated with many damaging earthquakes; along the plate interface, within the descending Cocos slab and within the overriding North American plate. The most recent event in the same region as the 2020 earthquakes was the 2018 Oaxaca earthquake, which struck 225 km to the northwest. 6-year catalog of seismicity states that Oaxaca had had over 14,000 earthquakes near or in the region since 1995. The reason is that Oaxaca is in a region with many shallow subduction angles. 25 percent of all the earthquakes in Mexico are in Oaxaca. Oaxaca is near the Tehuantepec fracture zone, which is where the plates stick together causing frictions leading to earthquakes. Oaxaca collides with Cocos, North American and the Caribbean plate making it the perfect formula for big and dangerous plates.

== Earthquake ==
Modified Mercalli intensities in selected locations
MMI	Locations	Population exposure
MMI IX (Violent)	Mazunte	1,000
MMI VIII (Severe)	Santa Maria Xadani; San Miguel del Puerto	45,000
MMI VII (Very strong)	Santa Maria Huatulco	204,000
MMI VI (Strong)	Santo Domingo Tehuantepec	1.48 million
MMI V (Moderate)	Iztacalco	1.63 million
MMI IV (Light)	Mexico City	37.7 million

According to the United States Geological Survey (USGS), the epicenter of the earthquake was located 12 kilometers (7.5 mi) south-southwest of Santa María Zapotitlán, Oaxaca, between La Crucecita in the Bahías de Huatulco tourist resort to the southwest and the port of Salina Cruz to the northeast. The hypocentral depth was 20.0 km (12.4 mi). The depth and the observed focal mechanism are consistent with displacement on the plate interface. Aftershocks and smaller quakes continued through Tuesday afternoon, and could be felt by residents of Oaxaca.

Sentinel-1 radar measurements

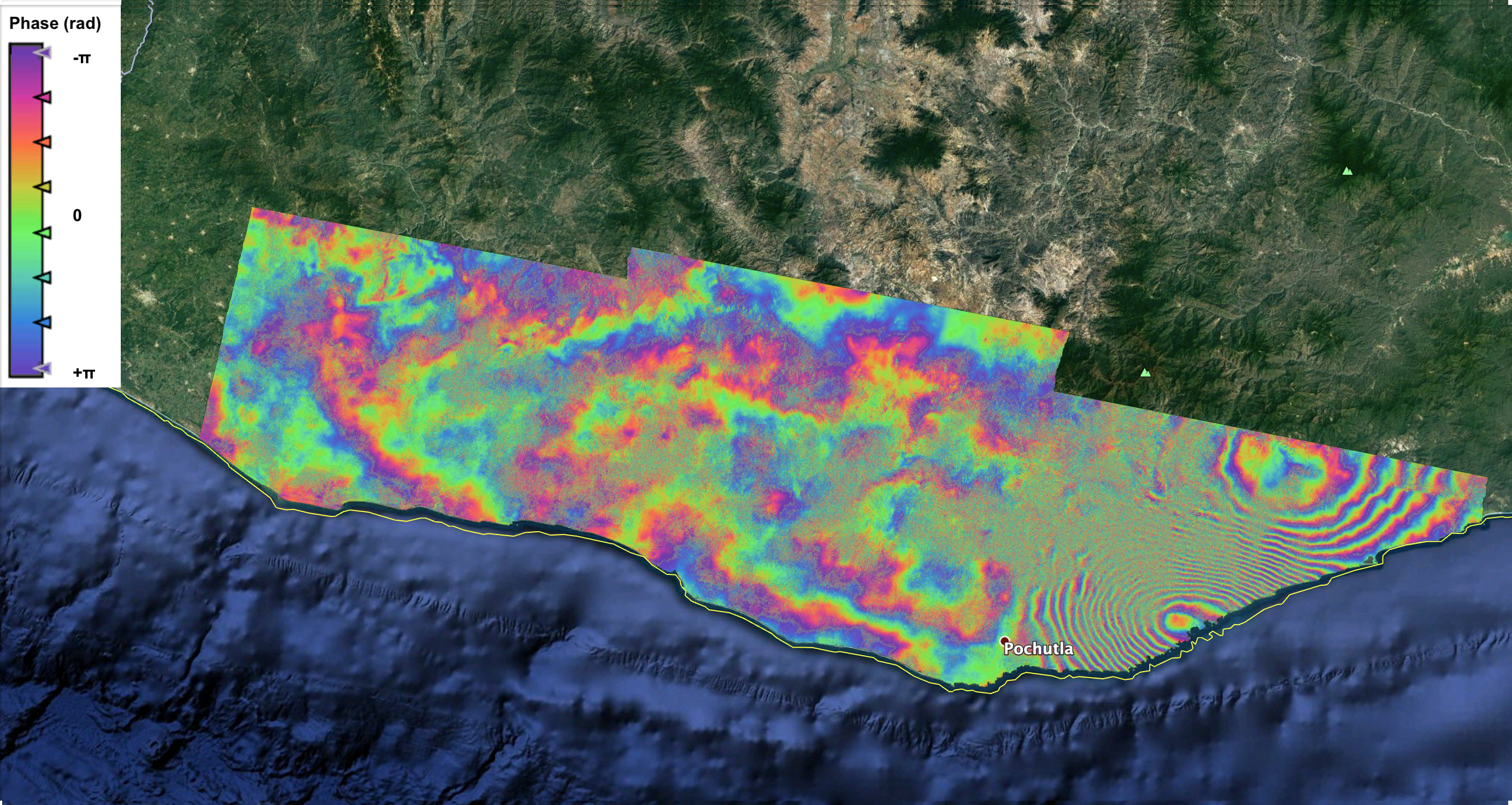
Surface displacement

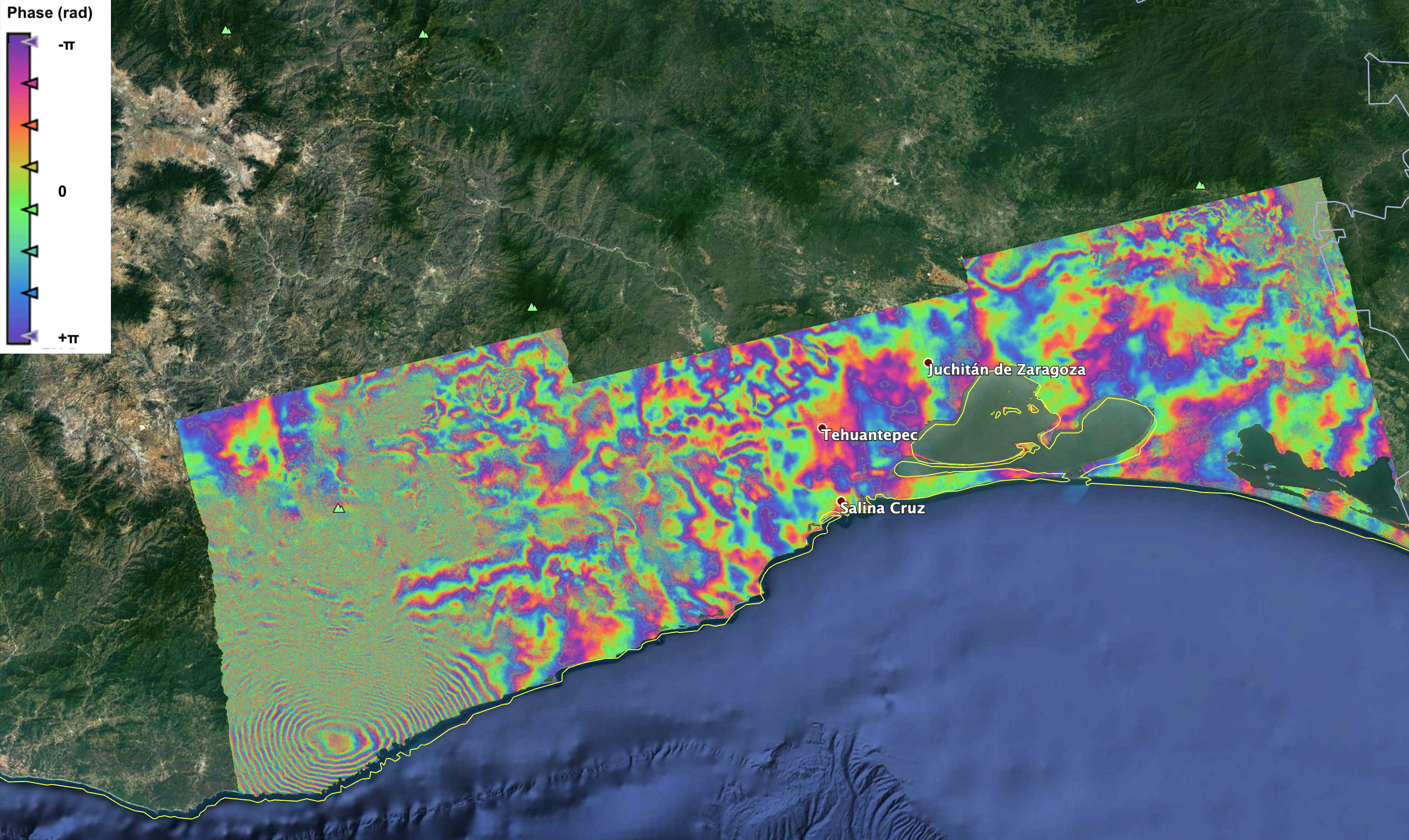
Surface displacement

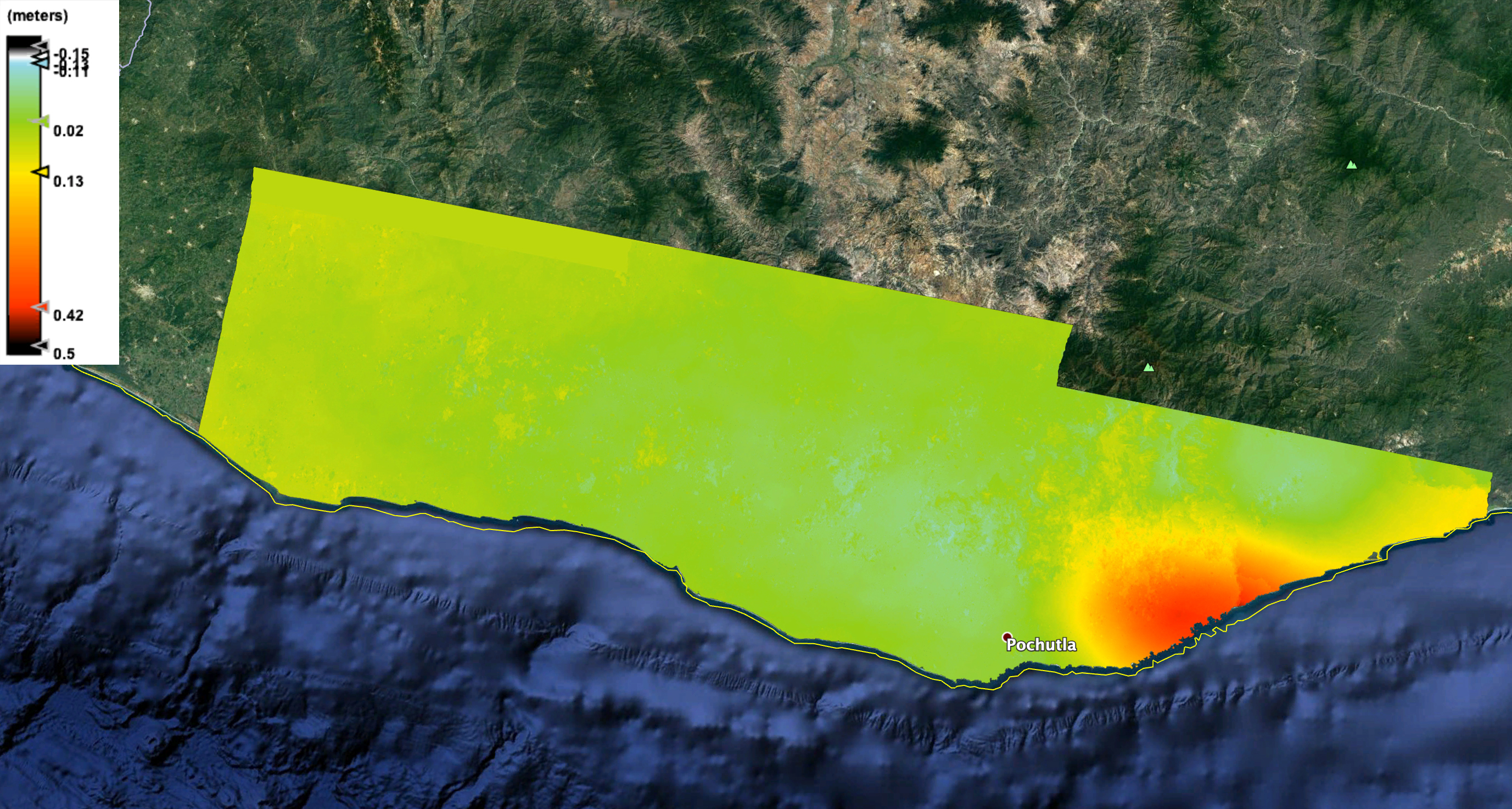
Surface deformation

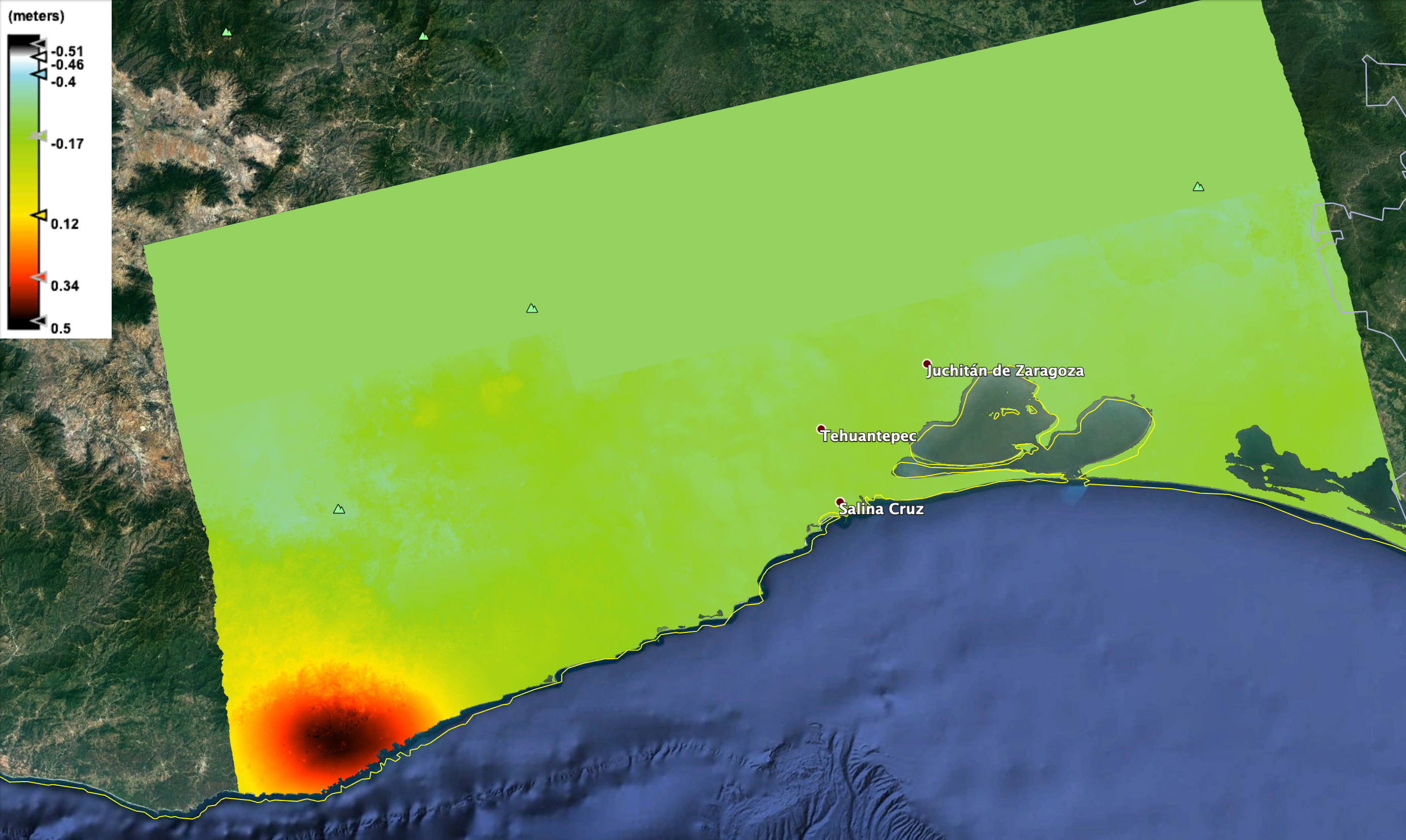
Surface deformation

== Damage ==
Widespread damage was reported from Oaxaca, with over 8,000 houses affected across 145 of the state's 570 municipalities. Other damaged structures included 213 schools, 15 health centers, three hospitals, 7 bridges and 25 sections of state highways. Streets and buildings were also shaken in Mexico City, and damage was observed in at least 14 buildings across the city, including the collapse of a single floor residence and 3 buildings already seriously damaged by the 2017 Puebla earthquake. Oaxaca's governor said that there were around 500 houses that have been damage by the earthquake. Also an archeological museum and a few schools were affected by the earthquake. They estimate the total cost in damage is around 100 million. Houses were scarred by wide cracks across walls and residents sought to clear debris from the streets. Experts said that its location off the coast helps explain the relatively limited damage.

=== Casualties ===
Ten people were killed in Oaxaca, and 25 people were injured. Most casualties were due to structural failure. A worker at the PEMEX oil refinery in Salina Cruz fell to his death from the top of a structure. A fire at the refinery injured another worker, although the fire was extinguished quickly.

== Response ==
Because its tectonic setting leads to frequent earthquakes in Mexico, the Mexican government's response has improved over the years. The Mexican government sent out a warning about the incoming earthquake with its alert system this allowed the residents to have enough time to get outdoors where it was safe. With some hospitals being damaged during the earthquake some patients had to be evacuated until it was safe to return.

== Tsunami ==
After the earthquake, warnings for a tsunami were set out for a radius of 1,600 kilometers (990 mi) allowing people to be prepared and stay alert. The highest wave that reached the coast was measured at 1.57 metres (5.2 ft) in Mazunte.

== See also ==
- List of earthquakes in 2020
- List of earthquakes in Mexico
