= Qaleh-ye Seyyed, Mohr =

Qaleh-ye Seyyed قلعه سيد
- Village
- Location within Iran
- Coordinates: 27°35′43″N 52°51′32″E
- Country: Iran
- Province: Fars
- County: Mohr
- Bakhsh: Central
- Rural District: Mohr

Population (2006)
  - Total: 27
- Time zone: UTC+3:30 (IRST)
  - Summer (DST): UTC+4:30 (IRDT)

Qaleh-ye Seyyed (Persian: قلعه سيد, also Romanized as Qal‘eh-ye Seyyed; also known as Qal‘eh Saiyid and Seyyed) is a village in Mohr Rural District, in the Central District of Mohr County, Fars province, Iran. At the 2006 census, its population was 27, in 6 families.
