= Khvoshabad, Fars =

Khvoshabad خوش اباد
- Village
- Location within Iran
- Coordinates: 27°28′26″N 52°57′19″E
- Country: Iran
- Province: Fars
- County: Mohr
- Bakhsh: Central
- Rural District: Mohr

Population (2006)
  - Total: 139
- Time zone: UTC+3:30 (IRST)
  - Summer (DST): UTC+4:30 (IRDT)

Khvoshabad (Persian: خوش اباد, also Romanized as Khvoshābād and Khowshābād; also known as Khosh Abad and Khushāba) is a village in Mohr Rural District, in the Central District of Mohr County, Fars province, Iran. At the 2006 census, its population was 139, in 29 families.
