= Northwest Samar State University =

Public university in Samar, Philippines

- Pamantasang Pampamahalaan ng Hilagang Kanlurang Samar (Filipino)
- Former names: Tiburcio Tancinco Memorial Vocational School (1959–1982); Tiburcio Tancinco Memorial Institute of Science and Technology (1982–2009)
- Motto in English: Resilience | Integrity | Service | Excellence
- Type: State university
- Established: 1959
- President: Dr. Benjamin L. Pecayo
- Vice-president: Dr. Ramil S. Catamora (VP for Academic Affairs); Dr. Riz Rupert L. Ortiz (VP for Research, Extension & External Affairs); Engr. Rhio C. Dimakiling (VP for Administrative Affairs)
- Location: Calbayog, Samar, Philippines; 12°04′15″N 124°35′46″E
- Colors: Green, White, & Rust Orange
- Nickname: NwSSU Lions
- Website: www.nwssu.edu.ph
- Location in the Visayas Location in the Philippines

Northwest Samar State University is a public university in the Philippines located in Calbayog with extension campus in San Jorge, Samar. It is mandated to provide advanced education, higher technological, professional instruction and training in trade, fishery, agriculture, science, education, commerce, engineering, forestry, nautical courses and other related fields. It is also mandated to undertake research and extension services, and provide progressive leadership in its areas of specialization. Its main campus is in Calbayog.

== History ==
In 1948, Calbayog High School was established to cater to the underprivileged students of Calbayog. It existed for seven years until closed due to lack of funding support.

On June 21, 1959, Republic Act 2441 was passed into law to establish Tiburcio Tancingo Memorial Vocational School, named after a prominent judge Tiburcio Tancinco.

On November 14, 1982, Batas Pambansa 304 was passed into law converting Tiburcio Tancinco Memorial Vocational School into Tiburcio Tancinco Memorial Institute of Science and Technology.

On June 14, 1998, Republic Act 8655 then Samar National Agricultural School was renamed Samar State College of Agriculture and Fisheries of would become now San Jorge, Samar campus.

On October 14, 2009, Republic Act No. 9719 was signed into law, renaming Tiburcio Tancinco Memorial Institute of Science and Technology into Northwest Samar State University integrating therewith Samar State College of Agriculture and Forestry located in San Jorge, Samar.

== Campuses ==
- Calbayog (main)
- San Jorge

== Sources ==
- Batas Pambansa Blg. 304
- Republic Act No. 9719
