= Qaleh-ye Mohammad Ali, Fars =

Qaleh-ye Mohammad Ali قلعه محمدعلی
- Village
- Location within Iran
- Coordinates: 27°34′44″N 52°48′57″E
- Country: Iran
- Province: Fars
- County: Mohr
- Bakhsh: Central
- Rural District: Arudan

Population (2006)
  - Total: 1,234
- Time zone: UTC+3:30 (IRST)
  - Summer (DST): UTC+4:30 (IRDT)

Qaleh-ye Mohammad Ali (Persian: قلعه محمدعلی, also Romanized as Qal‘eh-ye Moḩammad 'Alī and Qal‘eh Moḩammad 'Alī; also known as Qal‘eh-ye Bolandī) is a village in Arudan Rural District, in the Central District of Mohr County, Fars province, Iran. At the 2006 census, its population was 1,234, in 238 families.
