= Chahu, Mohr =

Village in Fars province, Iran

Chahu Persian: چاهو
- Village
- Location within Iran
- Coordinates: 27°34′21″N 52°50′35″E
- Country: Iran
- Province: Fars
- County: Mohr
- District: Central
- Rural District: Mohr

Population (2016)
  - Total: 846
- Time zone: UTC+3:30 (IRST)

Chahu (Persian: چاهو) (Note: Also romanized as Chāhū) is a village in Mohr Rural District of the Central District of Mohr County, Fars province, Iran.

== Demographics ==
=== Population ===
At the time of the 2006 National Census, the village's population was 754 in 154 households. The following census in 2011 counted 784 people in 187 households. The 2016 census measured the population of the village as 846 people in 243 households. It was the most populous village in its rural district.
