= San Jorge, Samar =

Municipality in Samar, Philippines

San Jorge
- Municipality
- Municipality of San Jorge
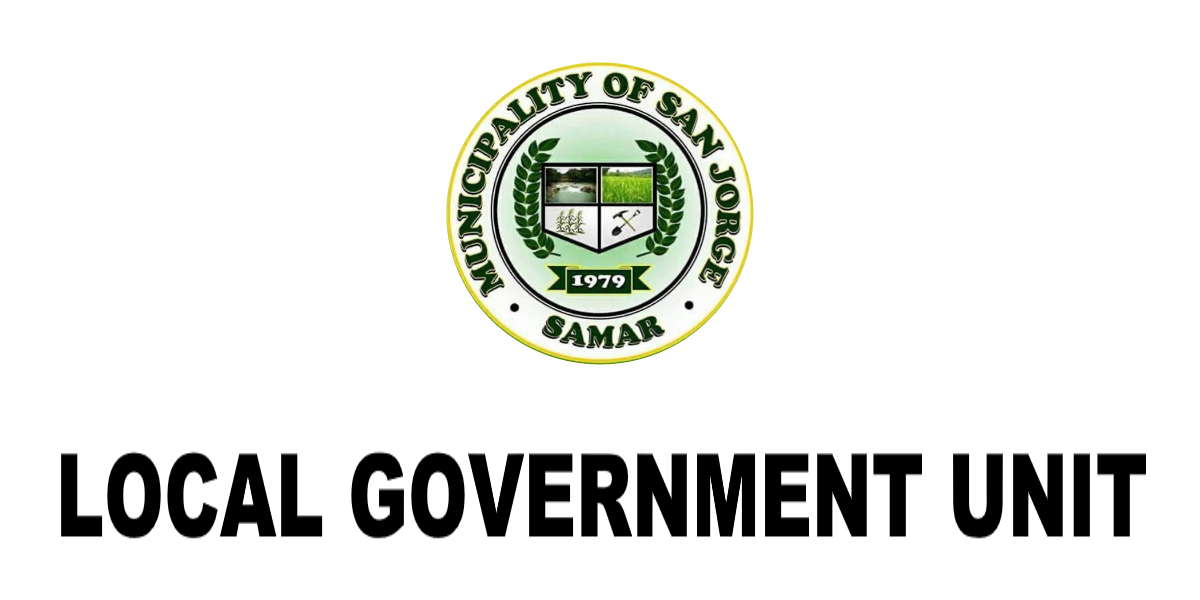
- Flag

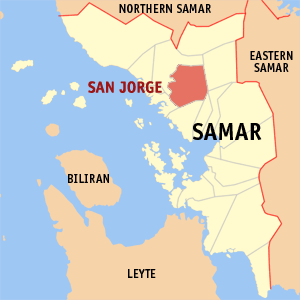
- Map of Samar with San Jorge highlighted
- Interactive map of San Jorge
- Location within the Philippines
- Coordinates: 11°59′N 124°49′E
- Country: Philippines
- Region: Eastern Visayas
- Province: Samar
- District: 1st district
- Founded: 1979
- Named for: Saint George
- Barangays: 41 (see Barangays)

Government
  - Type: Sangguniang Bayan
  - Mayor: Leoncio U. De Guia
  - Vice Mayor: Jay G. Bisnar0
  - Representative: Stephen James Tan
  - Councilors: 1. Marcelina D. Yu; 2. Albert De Guia; 3. Boyet Elles; 4. Maria Carmela Grey; 5. Rita Rama; 6. Marlon Montes; 7. Salvador Paquit; 8. Wilfredo Sale; DILG Masterlist of Officials
  - Electorate: 15,976 voters (2025)

Area
  - Total: 241.20 km^{2} (93.13 sq mi)
- Elevation: 168 m (551 ft)
- Highest elevation: 839 m (2,753 ft)
- Lowest elevation: 0 m (0 ft)

Population (2024 census)
  - Total: 17,863
  - Density: 74.059/km^{2} (191.81/sq mi)
  - Households: 3,990

Economy
  - Income class: 3rd municipal income class
  - Poverty incidence: 31.85% (2023)
  - Revenue: ₱ 164.4 million (2024)
  - Assets: ₱ 412.3 million (2024)
  - Expenditure: ₱ 162.6 million (2024)
  - Liabilities: ₱ 88.69 million (2024)

Service provider
  - Electricity: Samar 1 Electric Cooperative (SAMELCO 1)
- Time zone: UTC+8 (PST)
- ZIP code: 6723
- PSGC: 0806025000
- IDD : area code: +63 (0)55
- Native languages: Waray; Tagalog

San Jorge, officially the Municipality of San Jorge (Waray: Bungto han San Jorge; Tagalog: Bayan ng San Jorge), is a municipality in the province of Samar, Philippines. According to the 2024 census, it has a population of 17,863 people.

The town is famous for its Blanca Aurora Falls near Barangay Blanca Aurora along the Blanca Aurora river. An inauguration is held every 10 October since 1979.

Due to farming abundancy here in San Jorge, they proclaimed Saint George as their Patron Saint and because it happened that the name were similar to a historical person named George Curn.

== History ==
The community is one of the oldest barangay of municipality of Gandara. Its history can be traced back to the American regime. Even its name San Jorge was in honor of an American soldier by the name of George Curn who happened to own and donate the site where the old barangay was formerly located. The present location is the second site of the barangay. Its old site was located across the Sapinit River where the San Jorge Elementary School is presently nestled.

The municipality of San Jorge was established by virtue of Batas Pambansa Blg. 11 issued on December 6, 1978, upon separation of 29 barangays in Gandara, with a barangay with the same name the seat of government. A plebiscite was held on February 4, 1979.

== Geography ==
=== Barangays ===
San Jorge is divided into 41 barangays. Each barangay consists of puroks and some have sitios.

- Aurora
- Blanca Aurora
- Buenavista I
- Bulao
- Bungliw
- Cogtoto-og
- Calundan
- Cantaguic
- Canyaki
- Erenas
- Guadalupe
- Hernandez
- Himay
- Janipon
- La Paz
- Libertad
- Lincoro
- Matalud
- Mobo-ob
- Quezon
- Ranera
- Rosalim
- San Isidro
- San Jorge I (Poblacion)
- Sapinit
- Sinit-an
- Tomogbong
- Gayondato
- Puhagan
- Anquiana
- Bay-ang
- Buenavista II
- Cabugao
- Cag-olo-olo
- Guindapunan
- Mabuhay
- Mancol (Poblacion)
- Mombon
- Rawis
- San Jorge II (Poblacion)
- San Juan

=== Climate ===
Climate data for San Jorge, Samar
| Month | Jan | Feb | Mar | Apr | May | Jun | Jul | Aug | Sep | Oct | Nov | Dec | Year |
|---|---|---|---|---|---|---|---|---|---|---|---|---|---|
| Mean daily maximum °C (°F) | 28 (82) | 29 (84) | 29 (84) | 31 (88) | 31 (88) | 30 (86) | 29 (84) | 29 (84) | 29 (84) | 29 (84) | 29 (84) | 28 (82) | 29 (85) |
| Mean daily minimum °C (°F) | 21 (70) | 21 (70) | 21 (70) | 22 (72) | 24 (75) | 24 (75) | 24 (75) | 25 (77) | 24 (75) | 24 (75) | 23 (73) | 22 (72) | 23 (73) |
| Average precipitation mm (inches) | 72 (2.8) | 52 (2.0) | 65 (2.6) | 62 (2.4) | 87 (3.4) | 129 (5.1) | 153 (6.0) | 124 (4.9) | 147 (5.8) | 157 (6.2) | 139 (5.5) | 117 (4.6) | 1,304 (51.3) |
| Average rainy days | 17.4 | 13.4 | 16.8 | 18.0 | 22.0 | 25.3 | 26.2 | 24.2 | 24.9 | 26.0 | 23.3 | 20.8 | 258.3 |
Source: Meteoblue

=== Flooding and erosion potential ===
Two mountainside slope rolling down to the San Jorge National High School and a Gasoline Station were observed to be a potential flood prone areas, developer and planning engineers constructed a Rectangular Culvert alongside the 1 AH 26 Sleeves going to the San Jorge River. With a vast water shed area just below the municipality of San Jose de Buan, San Jorge area is really a drainage area in times of rainy season. In a matter of two consecutive days rain, flood waters automatically rumbles down the slopes going to the lowland areas from Buenavista, Bulao, La Paz, Mombon, San Jorge Proper, Erenas then directly towards the low-lying areas of the town of Gandara then to the town of Pagsanghan and the samar sea finally. Areas like the barangays of Buenavista, Janipon, Bulao, Guindapunan, La Paz, Mombon, and Anquiana could be soaked for a couple of days which usually leads to destruction of standing crops in the lowlands. These are usually rice, corn, vegetables and other crops in the flat lands.

== Demographics ==
Population census of San Jorge
| Year | Pop. | ±% p.a. |
|---|---|---|
| 1980 | 9,123 | — |
| 1990 | 10,111 | +1.03% |
| 1995 | 11,935 | +3.16% |
| 2000 | 13,376 | +2.47% |
| 2007 | 14,134 | +0.76% |
| 2010 | 16,340 | +5.42% |
| 2015 | 17,184 | +0.96% |
| 2020 | 17,579 | +0.48% |
| 2024 | 17,863 | +0.39% |
Source: Philippine Statistics Authority

== Tourism ==
=== geo-Science and Tourism ===
An underwater (Creek) Pipes are to be installed from Tumogbong (Binubukalan) will be connected directly to main Village of Blanca Aurora to keep the beauty of the old Falls of Blanca.

Aleco Water resort

Secret Falls 2

Nature Island (Branch Water Resort)

Cabubas Water Resort

La Isla Sanare at Brgy. Tomogbong
La Isla Sanare

== Economy ==
Poverty incidence of San Jorge (%)

Source: Philippine Statistics Authority

== Infrastructure ==
Water Systems
Japan International Coordination Agency (JICA) constructed a water systems on this town, the source of water was on Tomogbong (284 meters above MeanSeaLevel), there is a Distilled Water Spring uphill the Atigbang proper. The pipelines runs to the town Proper above then Mayor Cristeta Racuyal Corrales a Concrete Reservoir and distribute it back to the barrios. Saint George elevation is 272 meters below Tomogbong (Reference Elevation 1), there is a proposed pipelines that will run from Town Proper to Atigbang Sapinit, Rosalim, Aurora and County 27 November; at Sapinit Primary School elevation is 257 meters below Ref.Point, at Near San Jorge Cemetery elevation is 250 meters below Reference Point 1, approaching Mabuhay elevation higher than passed barrios is elevation 241 meters below Ref. Point 1, at 1 AH (Asian Highway) 26 kilometer Post 777 elevation is 216 meters below Ref. POint and approaching Quezon is 67 meters above MSL.

Blanca village is above the Tidal Level (20 meters) as seen on the Blanca Aurora Falls, the pipelines runs above the Village streets, this installation were a Vacuum type installation, towners ask and wonder why they have to make the faucet always be open, and the answer is the type of hydraulic design they got from JICA.

There is another planned development and business of the Town of Saint George, it is by supplying the town of Gandera a potable water, the highest elevation that will encounter is 268 meters below Tomogbong and 6 Kilometers distance pipelines.

Blanca Solar and Diesel Powered Water Chlorination Plant (proposed)

Solid Waste Management
A Garbage truck collects the garbage of the town, it is dumped in the common dumping area in Hinogacan, Gandara, Samar.

Department of Agriculture (Bio&Seed Farm)

LaPaz Agricultural micro-Bridge

LaPaz-Puhagan Dam and Irrigation Canals

Blanca Farm-to-Market Road Bridge

Blanca to Pinipisakan Tourism Road Extension
