= Arudan-e Olya =

Village in Fars province, Iran

Arudan-e Olya Persian: ارودان عليا
- Village
- Location within Iran
- Coordinates: 27°35′10″N 52°48′00″E
- Country: Iran
- Province: Fars
- County: Mohr
- District: Central
- Rural District: Arudan

Population (2016)
  - Total: 1,984
- Time zone: UTC+3:30 (IRST)

Arudan-e Olya (Persian: ارودان عليا) (Note: Also romanized as Ārūdān-e ‘Olyā; also known as Aroodan, Arūdān, Arūdān-e Bālā, and Arudūn) is a village in, and the capital of, Arudan Rural District of the Central District of Mohr County, Fars province, Iran.

== Demographics ==
=== Population ===
At the time of the 2006 National Census, the village's population was 1,755 in 357 households. The following census in 2011 counted 1,953 people in 471 households. The 2016 census measured the population of the village as 1,984 people in 539 households. It was the most populous village in its rural district.
