= 2020 Masbate earthquake =

2020 earthquake in the Philippines

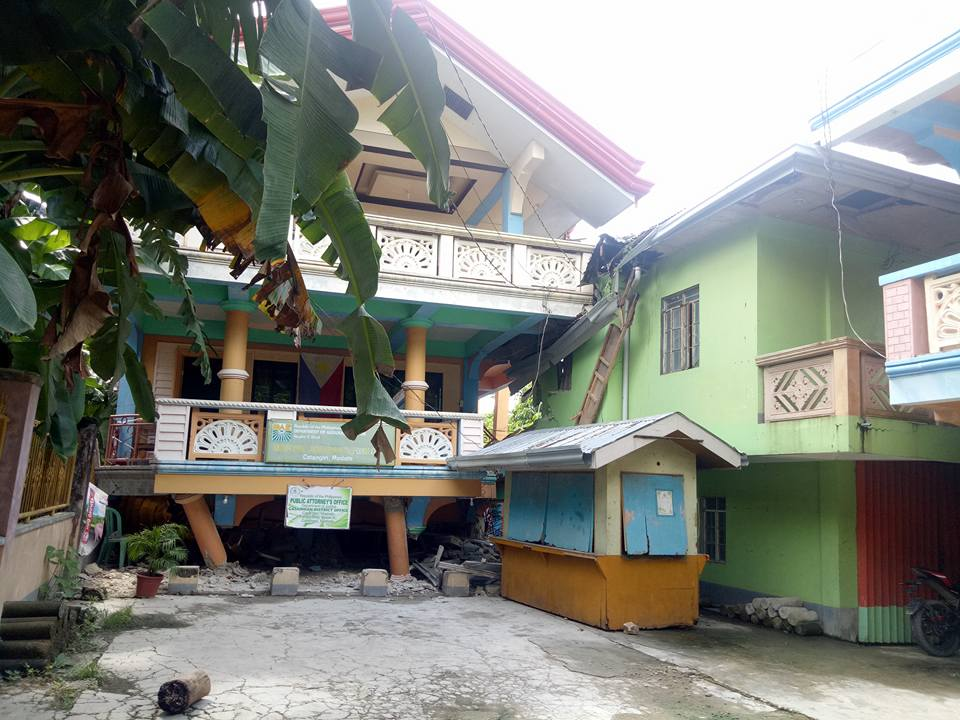
- Partially collapsed building housing the Public Attorney's Office and Department of Agrarian Reform in Cataingan

- Location within Visayas Location within Philippines
- UTC time: 2020-08-18 00:03:47
- ISC event: 618734405
- USGS-ANSS: ComCat
- Local date: August 18, 2020
- Local time: 8:03:47 PST
- Magnitude: 6.6 M_{ww}
- Depth: 13 km (8 mi)
- Epicenter: 11.98°N 124.01°E
- Fault: Philippine Fault
- Type: Strike-slip
- Areas affected: Bicol Region, Central Visayas, Eastern Visayas, Western Visayas
- Total damage: ₱23.9 million
- Max. intensity: MMI VIII (PEIS VII)
- Tsunami: None
- Casualties: 2 dead, 170 injured

On August 18, 2020, at 8:03 PST (00:03 UTC), a 6.6 magnitude earthquake struck the island province of Masbate in the Philippines, leaving at least 2 dead and 170 injured.

== Earthquake ==
The Philippine Institute of Volcanology and Seismology (PHIVOLCS) initially reported a magnitude 6.5 earthquake striking at 8:03 am Philippine Standard Time (PST) in Cataingan, Masbate. The report was later revised to a magnitude 6.6 earthquake. The earthquake was also felt in several parts of Luzon and the Visayas. The fault from which the earthquake originated is the Masbate segment of the Philippine fault system.

PHIVOLCS intensity
Intensity	Location
VII	Cataingan, & Pio V. Corpus, Masbate
VI	Palanas, Dimasalang, Placer, & Esperanza, Masbate
V	Masbate City, Cawayan, Baleno, Aroroy, & Mobo, Masbate; Almagro, & Tagapul-an, Samar
IV	San Jacinto, Masbate; Almeria, Naval, Cabucgayan, Caibiran, Culaba, Kawayan, Maripipi, & Biliran, Biliran; Catarman, Mapanas, and Palapag, Northern Samar; Iriga City, & Baao, Camarines Sur; Ormoc City, City of Tacloban, Babatngon, Barugo, Capoocan, Dagami, Dulag, Jaro, Julita, Kananga, La Paz, Palo, Pastrana, Tanauan, Tolosa, & Leyte, Leyte; Bulusan, Irosin, & Sorsogon City, Sorsogon; Ligao City, & Legazpi City, Albay; San Andres, Quezon; Cebu City; Bantayan, Madridejos, Santa Fe, & Talisay City, Cebu; Ivisan, & Roxas City, Capiz; Kalibo, Aklan; Sagay City, Negros Occidental
III	San Pascual, Milagros, & Claveria, Masbate; Catbalogan City, Samar; Baybay City, Abuyog, Hilongos, Isabel, Javier, and Matalom, Leyte; Naga City; Goa, and San Jose, Camarines Sur; Panganiban, Catanduanes; Mulanay, Quezon; San Julian, & Balangiga, Eastern Samar; Batan, Makato, Malinao, New Washington, Numancia, & Tangalan, Aklan; Iloilo City; Bacolod City; Bago City, Kabankalan City, Victorias City, & Binalbagan City, Negros Occidental; Daanbantayan, Cebu
II	President Roxas, Capiz; Ibajay, Lezo, and Nabas, Aklan; Patnongon, San Jose de Buenavista, & Tibiao, Antique; Daet, Camarines Norte; Virac, Catanduanes; Guinayangan and Lopez, Quezon; Lapu-Lapu City; Mandaue City; City of Bogo, Cordova, Pinamungajan, and Sogod, Cebu; La Carlota City, Negros Occidental; Candijay, Bohol
I	Dumaguete City, Negros Oriental; Sipalay City, Negros Occidental

== Damage ==
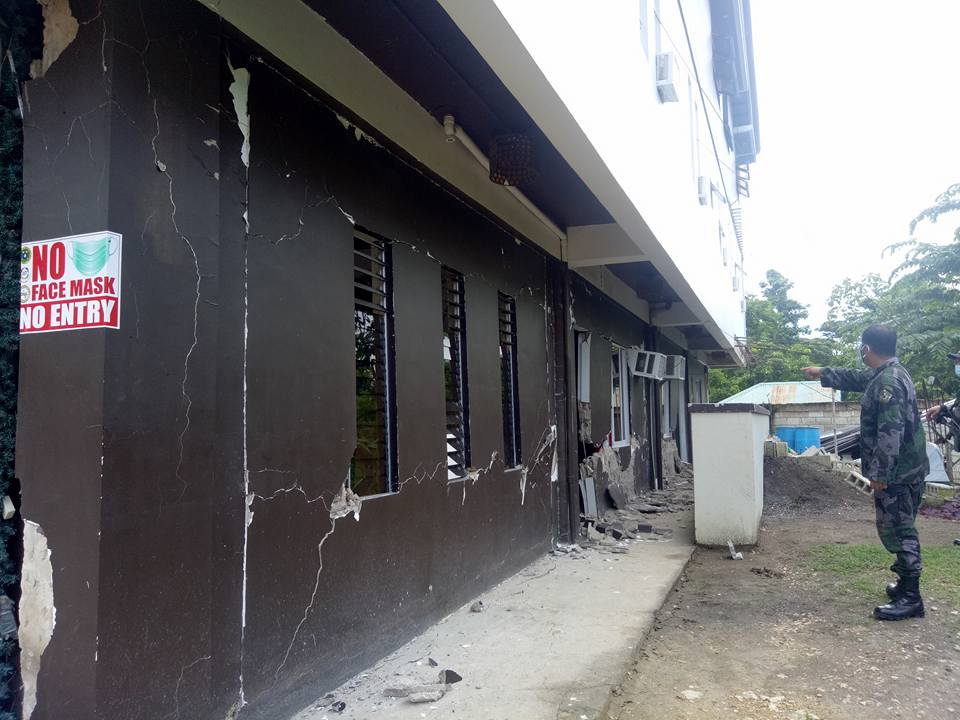
A residential building damaged by the earthquake

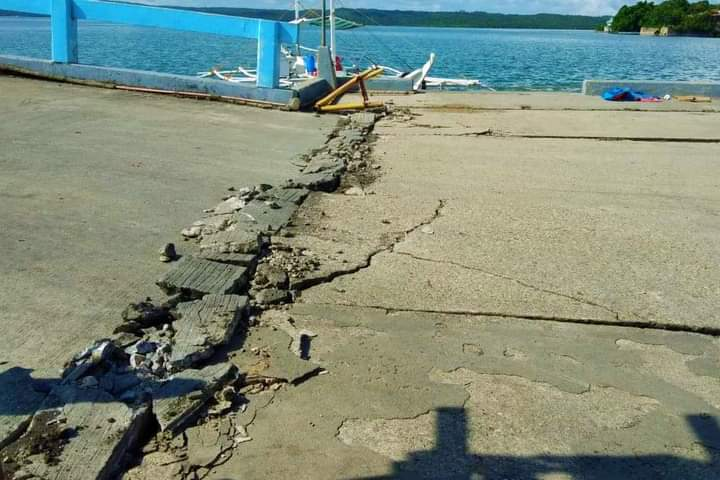
Cracks found in Cataingan Port following the quake

Several houses and buildings in Cataingan, Masbate collapsed due to the earthquake, including a three-story building, its old and new public market, a police station, and the docking area of Cataingan Port. Several roads and buildings throughout Masbate were also damaged according to the Office of Civil Defense of the Bicol Region. Power lines were also toppled down in the province, resulting in an unscheduled power interruption.

== Casualties ==
At least 170 people were injured, while 2 were confirmed dead; one retired policeman died after getting trapped when his house collapsed in Cataingan and one had a heart attack.

== See also ==
- List of earthquakes in 2020
- List of earthquakes in the Philippines
