= Qaleh-ye Seyyed, Kazerun =

Qaleh-ye Seyyed قلعه سيد
- Village
- Location within Iran
- Coordinates: 29°38′03″N 51°34′12″E
- Country: Iran
- Province: Fars
- County: Kazerun
- Bakhsh: Central
- Rural District: Deris

Population (2016)
  - Total: 2,185
- Time zone: UTC+3:30 (IRST)
  - Summer (DST): UTC+4:30 (IRDT)

Qaleh-ye Seyyed (Persian: قلعه سيد, also romanized as Qal‘eh-ye Seyyed and Qal‘eh-i-Saiyid) is a village in Deris Rural District, in the Central District of Kazerun County, Fars province, Iran. At the 2016 census, its population was 2,185, in 585 families.
