= Qaleh-ye Mohammad Ali, Kermanshah =

Village in Kermanshah, Iran

Qaleh-ye Mohammad Ali قلعه محمدعلي
- Village
- Location within Iran
- Coordinates: 34°16′19″N 47°26′02″E
- Country: Iran
- Province: Kermanshah
- County: Harsin
- Bakhsh: Bisotun
- Rural District: Shirez

Population (2006)
  - Total: 159
- Time zone: UTC+3:30 (IRST)
  - Summer (DST): UTC+4:30 (IRDT)

Qaleh-ye Mohammad Ali (Persian: قلعه محمدعلي, also Romanized as Qal‘eh-ye Moḩammad ‘Alī; also known as Qal‘a Imam Ali, Qal‘eh Imām ‘Ali, and Qal‘eh-ye Moḩammad ‘Alīkhān) is a village in Shirez Rural District, Bisotun District, Harsin County, Kermanshah Province, Iran. At the 2006 census, its population was 159, in 40 families.
