= Mohr, Fars =

City in Fars province, Iran

Mohr Persian: مهر
- City
- Location within Iran
- Coordinates: 27°33′05″N 52°52′56″E
- Country: Iran
- Province: Fars
- County: Mohr
- District: Central

Population (2016)
  - Total: 7,784
- Time zone: UTC+3:30 (IRST)

Mohr (Persian: مهر) (Note: Also romanized as Mehr; also known as Mohur, Mohur-i-Saiyidān, and Mūr) is a city in the Central District of Mohr County, Fars province, Iran, serving as capital of both the county and the district. It also serves as the administrative center for Mohr Rural District.

== Demographics ==
=== Population ===
At the time of the 2006 National Census, the city's population was 6,188 in 1,316 households. The following census in 2011 counted 7,823 people in 1,834 households. The 2016 census measured the population of the city as 7,784 people in 2,170 households.

== Economy ==
Mohr's main industries are based on its rich gas sources. Tabnak, Homa, Shanol, and Varavi are important gas zones in this region. It has a dry hot climate.
