= Qaleh-ye Seyyed, Ramhormoz =

Qaleh-ye Seyyed قلعه سيد
- Village
- Location within Iran
- Coordinates: 31°15′31″N 49°39′25″E
- Country: Iran
- Province: Khuzestan
- County: Ramhormoz
- Bakhsh: Central
- Rural District: Howmeh-ye Sharqi

Population (2006)
  - Total: 50
- Time zone: UTC+3:30 (IRST)
  - Summer (DST): UTC+4:30 (IRDT)

Qaleh-ye Seyyed (Persian: قلعه سيد, also Romanized as Qal‘eh-ye Seyyed) is a village in Howmeh-ye Sharqi Rural District, in the Central District of Ramhormoz County, Khuzestan Province, Iran. At the 2006 census, its population was 50, in 12 families.
