= Khvoshabad, Hormozgan =

Khvoshabad خوش اباد
- Village
- Location within Iran
- Coordinates: 28°28′12″N 55°28′12″E
- Country: Iran
- Province: Hormozgan
- County: Hajjiabad
- Bakhsh: Central
- Rural District: Dar Agah

Population (2006)
  - Total: 36
- Time zone: UTC+3:30 (IRST)
  - Summer (DST): UTC+4:30 (IRDT)

Khvoshabad (Persian: خوش اباد, also Romanized as Khvoshābād; also known as Khvoshnābād) is a village in Dar Agah Rural District, in the Central District of Hajjiabad County, Hormozgan Province, Iran. At the 2006 census, its population was 36, in 8 families.
