= Khvosh Hava =

Khvosh Hava خوش هوا
- Village
- Location within Iran
- Coordinates: 36°30′23″N 59°37′22″E
- Country: Iran
- Province: Razavi Khorasan
- County: Mashhad
- Bakhsh: Central
- Rural District: Tabadkan

Population (2006)
  - Total: 772
- Time zone: UTC+3:30 (IRST)
  - Summer (DST): UTC+4:30 (IRDT)

Khvosh Hava (Persian: خوش هوا, also Romanized as Khvosh Havā; also known as Khoshharā, Khushwar, and Khvoshābād) is a village in Tabadkan Rural District, in the Central District of Mashhad County, Razavi Khorasan Province, Iran. At the 2006 census, its population was 772, in 181 families.
