= Qaleh-ye Seyyed, Behbahan =

Qaleh-ye Seyyed قلعه سيد
- Village
- Location within Iran
- Coordinates: 30°36′30″N 50°18′53″E
- Country: Iran
- Province: Khuzestan
- County: Behbahan
- Bakhsh: Central
- Rural District: Howmeh

Population (2006)
  - Total: 765
- Time zone: UTC+3:30 (IRST)
  - Summer (DST): UTC+4:30 (IRDT)

Qaleh-ye Seyyed (Persian: قلعه سيد, also Romanized as Qal‘eh-ye Seyyed; also known as Qal‘eh-ye Seyyed Moqīm) is a village in Howmeh Rural District, in the Central District of Behbahan County, Khuzestan Province, Iran. At the 2006 census, its population was 765, in 139 families.
