= Khowshabad, South Khorasan =

Khowshabad خوش اباد
- Village
- Location within Iran
- Coordinates: 33°19′44″N 59°58′25″E
- Country: Iran
- Province: South Khorasan
- County: Zirkuh
- Bakhsh: Central
- Rural District: Zirkuh

Population (2006)
  - Total: 21
- Time zone: UTC+3:30 (IRST)
  - Summer (DST): UTC+4:30 (IRDT)

Khowshabad (Persian: خوش اباد, also Romanized as Khowshābād) is a village in Zirkuh Rural District, Central District, Zirkuh County, South Khorasan Province, Iran. At the 2006 census, its population was 21, in 6 families.
