= Santa María Xadani =

- Municipality and town
- Location in Mexico
- Coordinates: 16°22′N 95°1′W
- Country: Mexico
- State: Oaxaca
- District: Juchitán District

Area
  - Total: 89.31 km^{2} (34.48 sq mi)
- Elevation: 20 m (66 ft)
- Time zone: UTC-6 (Central Standard Time)

Santa María Xadani is a town and municipality in Oaxaca in south-western Mexico. It is part of the Juchitán District in the west of the Istmo de Tehuantepec region.

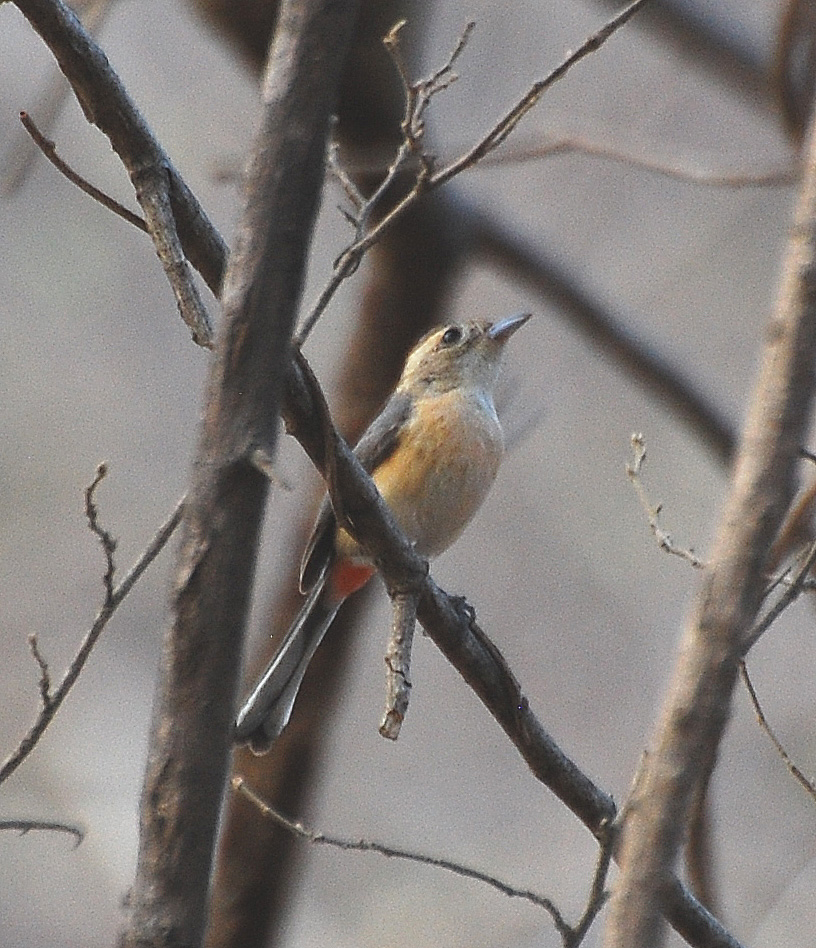
Red-breasted chat (Granatellus venustus) below Santa Maria Xadani

== Geography ==
The municipality covers an area of 89.31 km^{2}. The town is 20 meters above sea level, and is about 3 km from the Laguna Superior. The Los Perros river passes through the municipality and is used for irrigation. The climate is tropical, with summer rainfall averaging 950 mm.

=== Flora and fauna ===
Flora include mesquite, ceiba, sapodilla, coconut, gulavere, willow, fruit trees and native grasslands. Wild fauna include armadillo, iguana, rabbit, opossum and birds such as mockingbird and rook. Some efforts have been made to involve the inhabitants in reforestation programs, but with limited success.

== Demography ==
As of 2005, the municipality had 1,492 households with a total population of 7,283 of whom 6,114 spoke an indigenous language.

== Economy ==
Economic activities include cultivation of beans, sorghum, maize, sesame, pumpkin, peanut, melon and watermelon, animal husbandry of cattle, pigs and goats, and fishing for shrimp and other crustaceans in the lagoon.
