= Guindapunan =

- Location within the Philippines
- Coordinates: 11°58′48.576″N 124°51′21.924″E
- Country: Philippines

Population (2010)
  - Total: 549

Guindapunan is a barangay in the municipality of Daram on the island of Samar in the Philippines. Precinct COMELEC Code Number 60250021.

== History ==
Guindapunan has primary education, but intermediate education students enroll at Bulao Elementary School on the nearby island of Samar.

== Elected officials ==
Barangay Captain:

- Lolito Tamor - Captain

Newly Elected Barangay Captain:

- Mateo R. Bentillo - Brgy. Chairman/Captain

Councilors

== Name ==
The town of Guindapunan was named after a brook flowing into a main river in the area.

== Location ==
Said barangay is about 5 kilometers away from the town of San Jorge, going east. It is bounded in the north by Gandara River(Brgy. Proper) in the east by Brgy. Buenavista, to the south are mountain ranges and a portion of Brgy. Anquiana, to the west by the Municipality of San Jorge and Brgy. La Paz.

== Main Source of Livelihood ==
Guindapunanons are mostly farmers who sustain themselves by planting rice, corn, coconut, root-crops and other vegetables. Those who do not have any land, which can be farmed, work as labourers on the other plantations. There is an existing irrigation system in the area which is of little practical use due to the fact that there is no defined group to operate and take charge of the operation and maintenance of the system. If a system of operation and maintenance were organised, it would contribute greatly to the lives of the local farmers. Most farmers are practicing the old fashioned way of cultivating their fields. Rice is grown twice a year but the harvest is minimal. There are also farmers who harvest more, but these are the ones who have greater capital to invest in their businesses. Vegetable production at one time boomed in the area, but due to unorganised production, the production has failed because of rivalry and envy between the farmers. The people on the island are not yet ready for large scale production of goods as well as services.
