= Arudan Rural District =

Rural district in Fars province, Iran

Arudan Rural District Persian: دهستان ارودان
- Rural District
- Location within Iran
- Coordinates: 27°35′11″N 52°46′48″E
- Country: Iran
- Province: Fars
- County: Mohr
- District: Central
- Capital: Arudan-e Olya

Population (2016)
  - Total: 5,012
- Time zone: UTC+3:30 (IRST)

Arudan Rural District (Persian: دهستان ارودان) is in the Central District of Mohr County, Fars province, Iran. Its capital is the village of Arudan-e Olya.

== Demographics ==
=== Population ===
At the time of the 2006 National Census, the rural district's population was 4,372 in 877 households. There were 4,942 inhabitants in 1,173 households at the following census of 2011. The 2016 census measured the population of the rural district as 5,012 in 1,376 households. The most populous of its eight villages was Arudan-e Olya, with 1,984 people.
