= Mohr Rural District =

Rural district in Fars province, Iran

Mohr Rural District Persian: دهستان مهر
- Rural District
- Location within Iran
- Coordinates: 27°31′30″N 52°52′57″E
- Country: Iran
- Province: Fars
- County: Mohr
- District: Central
- Capital: Mohr

Population (2016)
  - Total: 2,590
- Time zone: UTC+3:30 (IRST)

Mohr Rural District (Persian: دهستان مهر) is in the Central District of Mohr County, Fars province, Iran. It is administered from the city of Mohr.

== Demographics ==
=== Population ===
At the time of the 2006 National Census, the rural district's population was 2,705 in 545 households. There were 2,448 inhabitants in 582 households at the following census of 2011. The 2016 census measured the population of the rural district as 2,590 in 731 households. The most populous of its 12 villages was Chahu, with 846 people.
