= Central District (Mohr County) =

District in Fars province, Iran

Central District (Mohr County) Persian: بخش مرکزی شهرستان مهر
- District
- Location within Iran
- Coordinates: 27°33′06″N 52°50′35″E
- Country: Iran
- Province: Fars
- County: Mohr
- Capital: Mohr

Population (2016)
  - Total: 15,386
- Time zone: UTC+3:30 (IRST)

The Central District of Mohr County (Persian: بخش مرکزی شهرستان مهر) is in Fars province, Iran. Its capital is the city of Mohr.

== Demographics ==
=== Population ===
At the time of the 2006 National Census, the district's population was 13,265 in 2,738 households. The following census in 2011 counted 15,213 people in 3,6613,589households. The 2016 census measured the population of the district as 15,386 inhabitants in 4,277 households.

=== Administrative divisions ===
Central District (Mohr County) Population
Administrative Divisions	2006	2011	2016
Arudan RD	4,372	4,942	5,012
Mohr RD	2,705	2,448	2,590
Mohr (city)	6,188	7,823	7,784
Total	13,265	15,213	15,386
RD = Rural District
