= 1883 in Iran =

- Decades
- See also: Other events of 1883; Years in Iran

The following lists events that happened during 1883 in Qajar era.

== Incumbents ==
- Monarch: Naser al-Din Shah Qajar

== Births ==
- January 19 – Kasbar Ipegian, Armenian playwright.
- February 14 – Tadj al-Saltaneh, Persian princess and memoirist of the Qajar Dynasty..
- ? – Abdolhossein Teymourtash, Iranian politician.
- ? – Ali Torab Jahromi, Iranian poet.
- ? – Fakhr-ol-Dowleh, Qajar princess.
- ? – Sems Kesmai, Iranian poet.
- ? – Zhaleh Alamtaj Qaem-Maqami, 20th century feminist Iranian poet.
