= Fazl ibn Musa ibn Ja'far =

Shrine in Jahrom, Fars, Iran

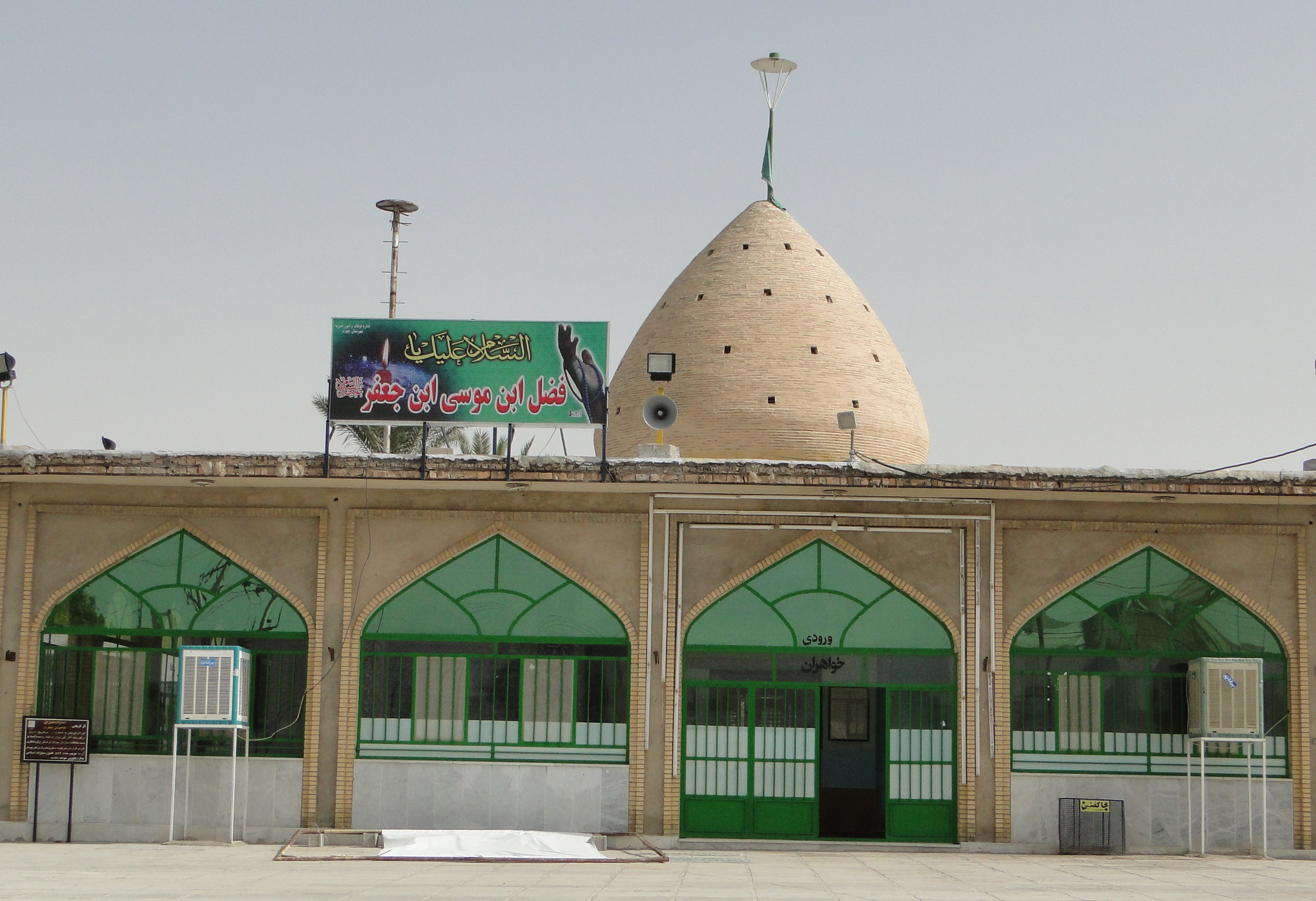
- The shrine, in 2009

- Location of the shrine in Iran

Religion
- Affiliation: Shia Islam
- Ecclesiastical or organisational status: Mausoleum, shrine, and mosque
- Status: Active

Location
- Location: Jahrom, Fars
- Country: Iran
- Coordinates: 28°30′44″N 53°35′15″E

Architecture
- Type: Mosque architecture
- Style: Seljuk
- Founder: Muhammad Seljuk
- Completed: 806 AH (1403/1404 CE)

Specifications
- Dome: One
- Shrines: One (a son of Musa al-Kadhim)
- Materials: Bricks

Fazl ibn Musa ibn Ja'far (Persian: امامزاده فضل بن موسی بن جعفر) is a Shi'ite mausoleum, shrine, and mosque complex, located in Jahrom, in the province of Fars, Iran. The complex contains the tomb of one of the sons of Musa al-Kadhim.

== Overview ==
The shrine is a small simple building with a simple brick dome and no decorations or tiling inside. The shrine was completed in 806 AH (1403/1404 CE), on the orders of King Muhammad Seljuk.

The monument has long attracted the attention of the people of Jahrom County and surrounding cities.

== See also ==
- Shia Islam in Iran
- List of imamzadehs in Iran
- List of mosques in Iran
