= 1874 in Iran =

- Decades
- See also: Other events of 1874; Years in Iran

The following lists events that happened during 1874 in Qajar era.

== Incumbents ==
- Monarch: Naser al-Din Shah Qajar

== Births ==
- January 3 – Javad bey Shikhlinski, Azerbaijani general.
- December 24 – Naser Divan Kazeruni, Iranian politician.
- ? – Bibi Maryam Bakhtiari, Iranian politician.
- ? – Ghassem Khan Vali, Sardar Homayoun, Iranian general.
- ? – Nari (poet), poet.
- ? – Yussef E'tesami, Iranian journalist, politician, publisher.
- ? – Mirza Ebrahim Khan Akkas Bashi, Iranian cinematographer and photographer.
- ? – Iraj Mirza, Iranian poet.
