= Hossein Ayatollahi =

Iranian Ayatollah (1931-2001)

Seyyed Hossein Ayatollahi
- Born: August 1931; Jahrom, Fars, Iran
- Died: 14 January 2001 (aged 69); Tehran, Fars, Iran

Seyyed Hossein Ayatollahi (Persian:سید حسین آیت‌اللهی) (August 1931 – 14 January 2001) was a Shiite clergyman, Ruhollah Khomeini Representative and Imam of Friday prayer of Jahrom.

== See also ==
- Abd al-Husayn Najafi Lari
