= Behrooz Mahmoodi-Bakhtiari =

- بهروز محمودی بختیاری
- Born: January 4, 1974 (age 52)

Academic background
- Education: Allameh Tabatabaee University (BA, MA, PhD)
- Thesis: نظام حالت در زبان‌های ایرانی (غربی): پژوهشی رده‌شناختی (Case system in Iranian (Western) Languages: A Typological Research) (2005)
- Doctoral advisor: Ali Mohammad Haghshenas
- Website: https://profile.ut.ac.ir/en/~mbakhtiari

Behrooz Mahmoodi-Bakhtiari (born January 1, 1974 Tehran; Persian: بهروز محمودی بختیاری) is an Iranian linguist and associate professor of literature at College of Fine Arts (University of Tehran).

== Life and works ==
He received his PhD in linguistics from Allameh Tabatabaee University in 2005 and formerly the head of the Department of Performing Arts at the University of Tehran.
