= Jahrom =

City in Fars province, Iran

Jahrom Persian: جهرم
- City
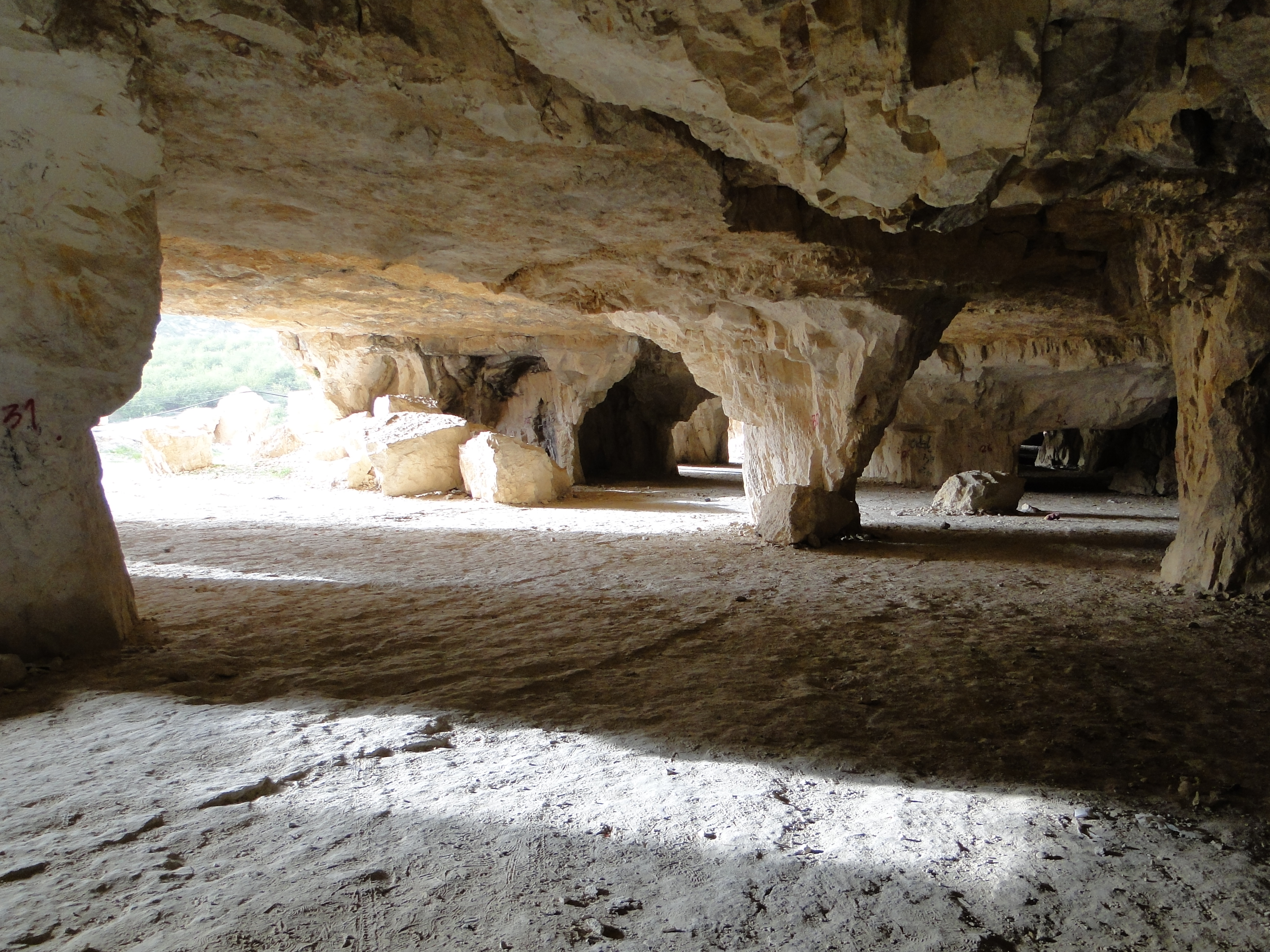
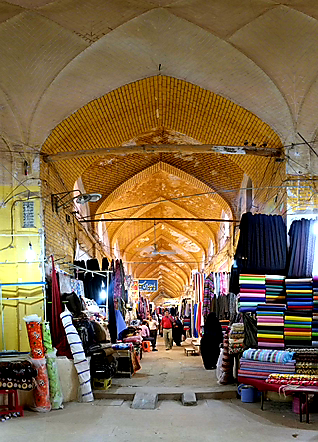
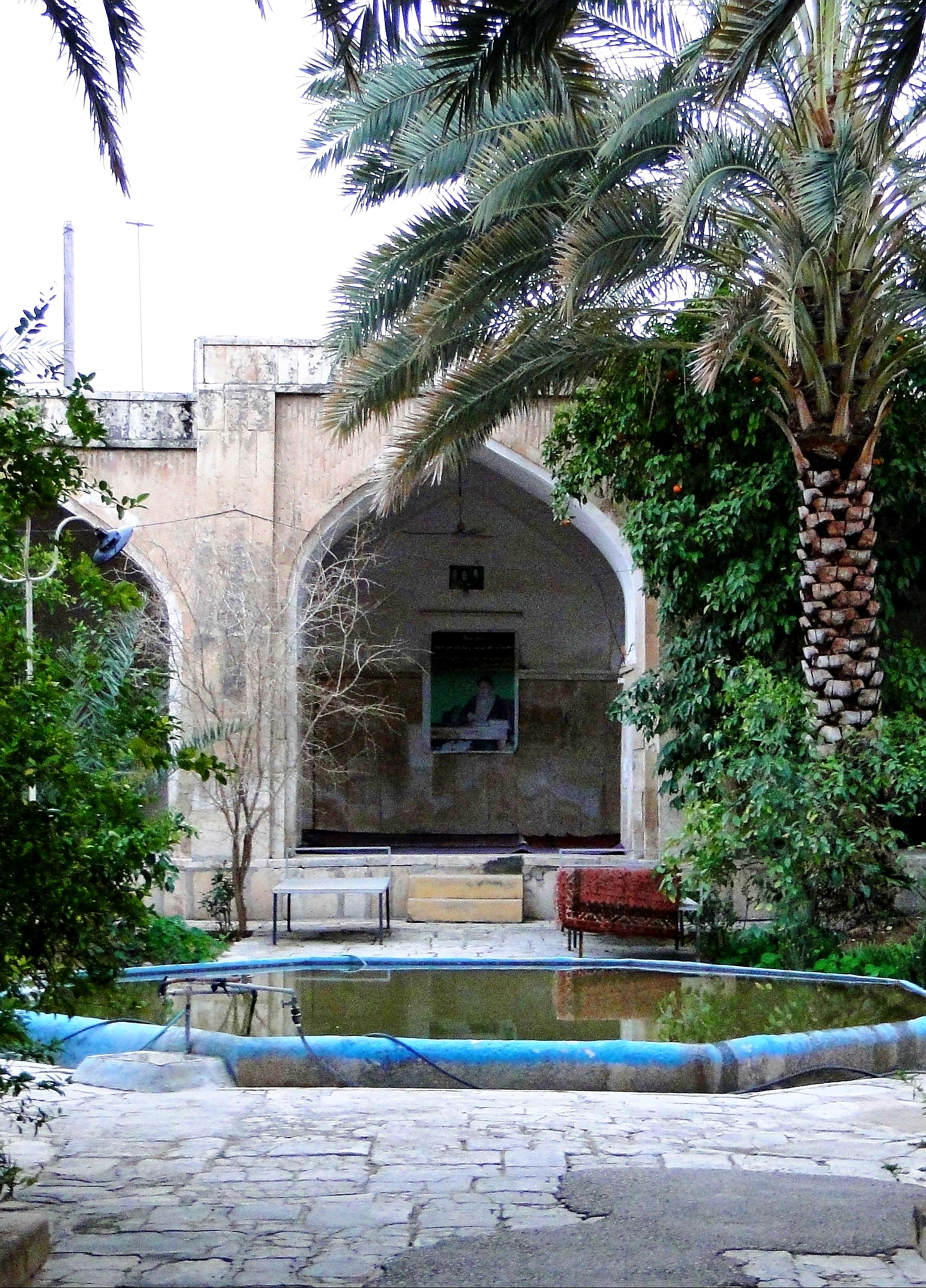
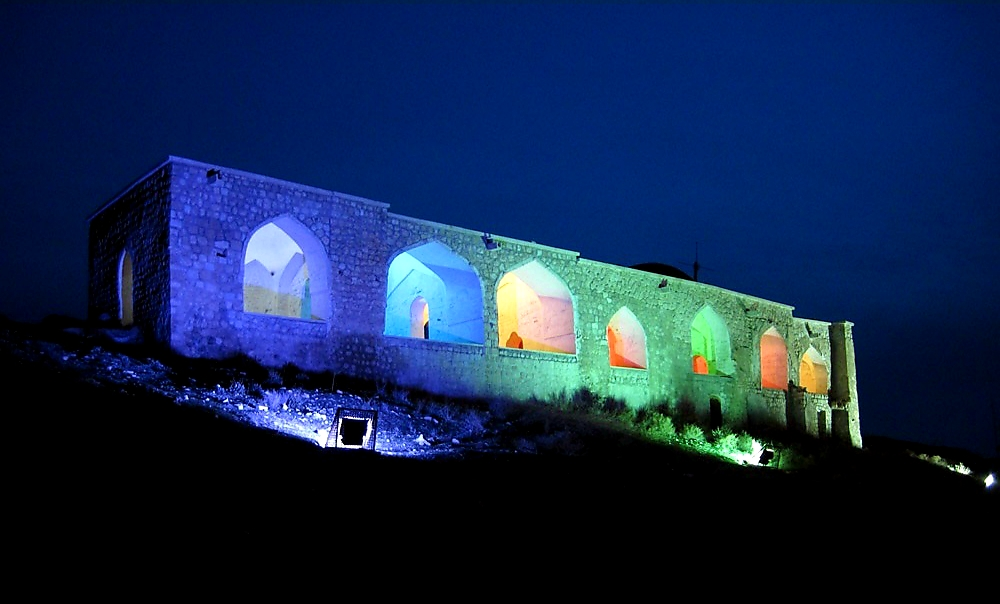
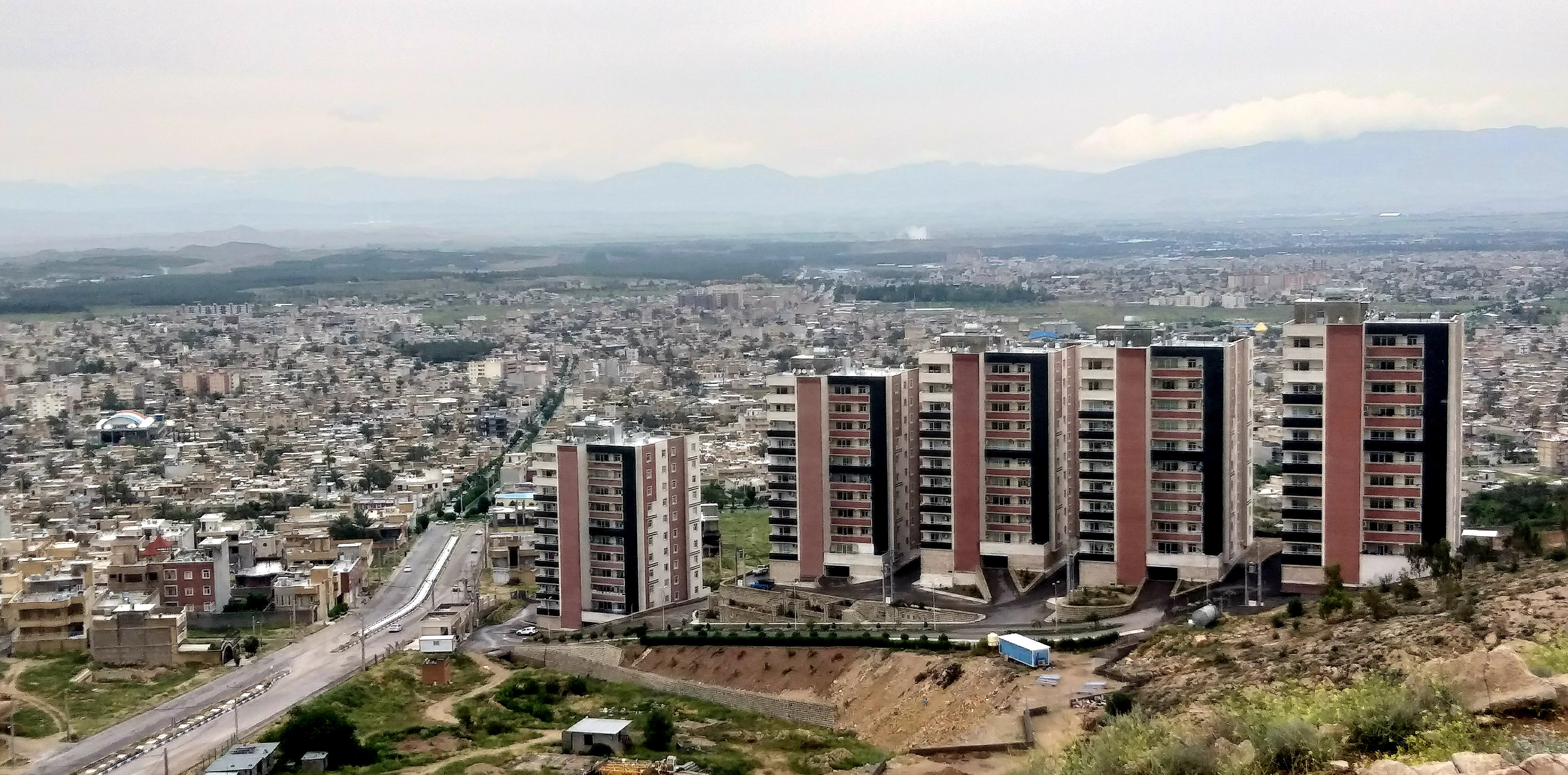
- From top to bottom, left to right: Sangtarashan cave, Bazaar of Jahrom, Khan Mosque, Jahrom fire temple (Qadamgah) and Skyline of Jahrom
- Nicknames: The Green Umbrella, Dar ol-Momenin, City of Sour Gold, Land of Palms and Oranges
- Location within Iran
- Coordinates: 28°30′53″N 53°34′23″E
- Country: Iran
- Province: Fars
- County: Jahrom
- District: Central

Area
  - Total: 40 km^{2} (15 sq mi)
  - Rank: 2nd
- Elevation: 1,050 m (3,440 ft)

Population (2025)
  - Total: 202,098
  - Estimate: 202,098
  - Density: 5,100/km^{2} (13,000/sq mi)
  - Population rank: 2rd
- Time zone: UTC+3:30 (IRST)
- Routes: Road 67; Road 674
- License plate: 73, 83
- Website: jahrom.ir

Jahrom (Persian: جهرم) (Note: Also known as Jahrūm) is a city in the Central District of Jahrom County, Fars province, Iran, serving as capital of both the county and the district. It is also the administrative center for Jolgah Rural District. The previous capital of the rural district was the village of Heydarabad. Jahrom is the largest city in southern Fars and the second-largest in the province.

Jahrom is one of the historical cities of Iran. The founder of the city of Jahrom, Artaxerxes I of Persia, the son of Xerxes I, the fifth Achaemenid king. Ferdosi has mentioned Jahrom many times in Shahnameh, especially in the stories related to Ardashir I. There are many ancient monuments and tourist attractions in Jahrom, Such as Sangtarashan cave, Jameh Mosque of Jahrom, Jahrom bazaar, Khan school and fire temple of Jahrom (Qadamgah).

Jahrom is 170 kilometres (110 mi) southeast of Shiraz, the capital of Fars province. Jahrom has a hot semi-arid climate, the average rainfall is about 285 millimetres (11.2 in) per year, and the average temperature is about 20 °C (68 °F). The average height of Jahrom is about 1,050 metres (3,440 ft) above sea level. The majority of people in Jahrom are Persians and Shia Muslims.

Jahrom, with several universities, hospitals and medical centers, is one of the academic and medical hubs of southern Iran. Jahrom has two industrial towns, a special economic zone, a dry port, a petrochemical plant, an international airport, an IRIB center, customs and a combined cycle power plant. Jahrom has special governorate and the municipality of the city is the second municipality in Fars province in terms of history of establishment and degree of municipality after Shiraz.

Jahrom's economy is based on agriculture and industry, and its most important agricultural products are dates and citrus. Jahrom produces 1.2% of the world's dates and 6% of its citrus fruits every year. Jahrom International Airport serves the city.

== Etymology ==
There are three theories about the name Jahrom. Based on Kar-Namag i Ardashir i Pabagan, in which Jahrom is mentioned as "Zarham"; It is probable that Jahrom means "green space". Based on Ahmad Kasravi, the late Iranian historian and philologist, the name Jahrom can be analyzed to render a "warm-place". Jahrom consists of "Ja" and "Hrom", Ja means "place" and "Hrom" in Avestan means "high and forbidden fortress", which is other name of the city of Barzeh (the current Takht-e Soleymān) In Iranian Azerbaijan, near the city of Maragheh.

=== Nicknames ===
"Green umbrella" is a nickname of Jahrom due to the resemblance of the huge masses of palm trees of Jahrom to green umbrellas. "Dar ol-Momenin" is the other nickname which means "house of faithful people" because of high percentage of Islam believers in the city.

Jahrom is also known as the "City of Sour Gold" due to production of lime and the "Land of Palms and Oranges", which are the two well-known plant species of the city and surrounding areas.

== History ==
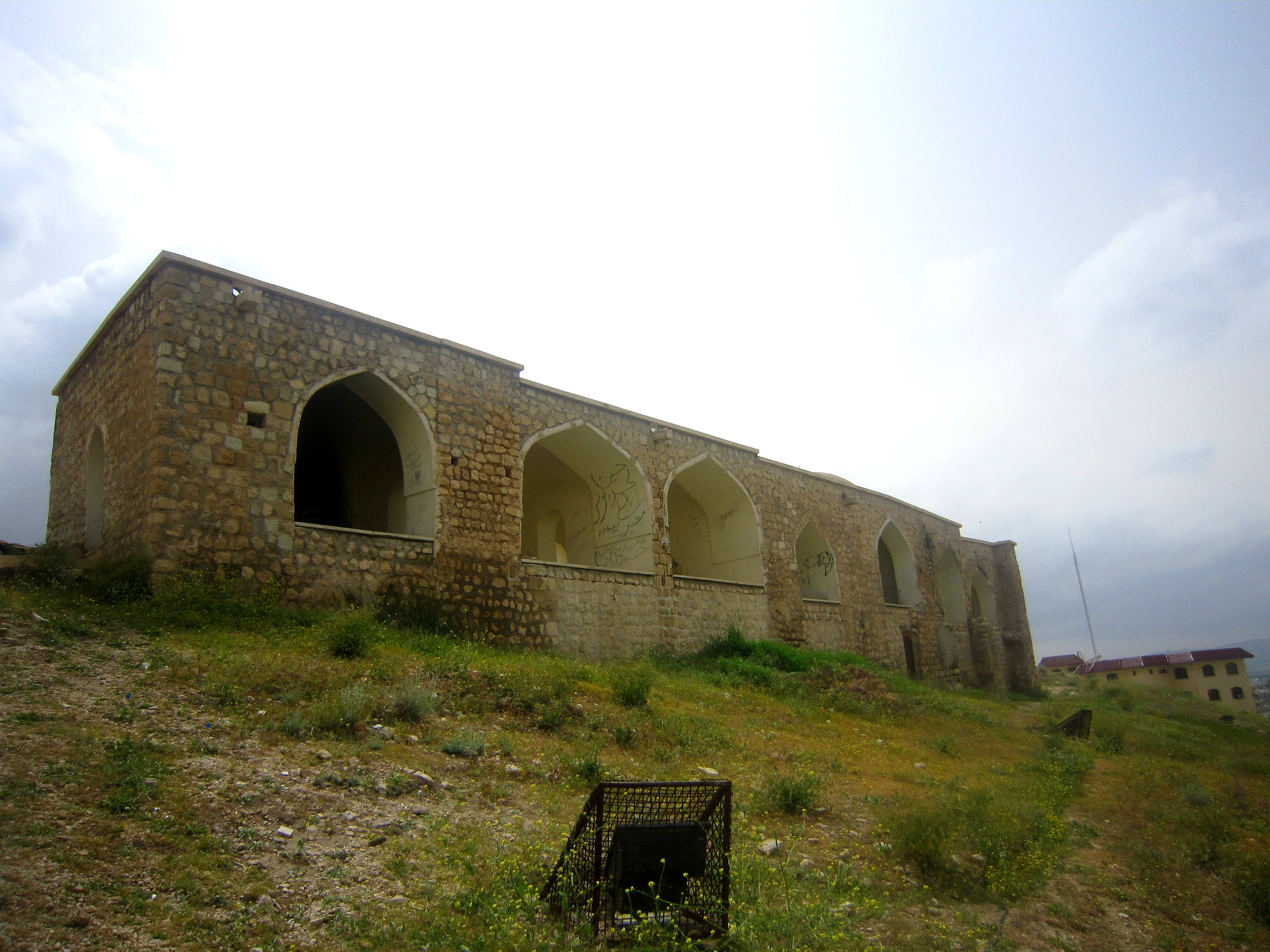
Qadamgah in Jahrom

Jahrom's history goes back some 2500 years when the Achaemenids established the Persian Empire. The establishment of the city is attributed to Artaxerxes I of Persia. The Sassanid monument of Qadamgāh is located to the south of the city, experts believe the monument was constructed during the late Sasanian dynastic era (224-651 AD), and it was a Zoroastrian shrine, probably a fire temple. Jahrom is the birthplace of Barbod, who became the main lyricist and musician in the court of the great Sassanid king Khosrau II (Parviz).

Jahrom was conquered by the Muslims in 641 or 644 after a fierce battle. "The Valley of the Martyrs" in west of the city was the site of this battle, which is why it is called so. As it is described in Fars-Nama, Jahrom's taxes were paid to the Crown Prince during the Buyid period. In the late Safavid and early Zand periods, was the start date of planting trees in Jahrom, specially palm trees.

During the Qajar period, the ruler of this city began to build buildings and places for urban affairs, including the construction of the bazaar, as well as numerous caravanserais and the development of the city. In 1887, Mohammad Hassan Mirza Mohandes, introduced Jahrom as the largest and most prosperous city in Persia after Shiraz and Bushehr. Etemad os-Saltanah describes Jahrom in the late Qajar period a larger city than cities like Qom and Kashan. People of Jahrom had an important rule in tobacco protests of 1890 and Persian Constitutional Revolution of early 20th century. Abd al-Husayn Najafi Lari was the Islamic leader of the city in this period.

Jahrom also had an important role in the Islamic revolution of Iran and was one of the 11 cities with martial law in pre-revolution protests. Seyyed Hossein ayatollahi was the Islamic leader of Jahrom in that period. A soldier killed the military governor of Jahrom on the birthday of Mohammad Reza Pahlavi on 6 October 1978. 1,200 people of Jahrom were martyred during Iran–Iraq War.

== Demographics ==
=== Population ===
Population pyramid 2010
| % | Males | Age | Females | % |
|---|---|---|---|---|
| 0.4 | | 85+ | | 0.4 |
| 0.4 | | 80–84 | | 0.4 |
| 0.6 | | 75–79 | | 0.6 |
| 0.7 | | 70–74 | | 0.7 |
| 1.0 | | 65–69 | | 1.0 |
| 1.3 | | 60–64 | | 1.3 |
| 2.1 | | 55–59 | | 1.9 |
| 2.6 | | 50–54 | | 2.4 |
| 3.0 | | 45–49 | | 2.9 |
| 3.3 | | 40–44 | | 3.3 |
| 3.4 | | 35–39 | | 3.5 |
| 4.5 | | 30–34 | | 4.7 |
| 6.4 | | 25–29 | | 6.1 |
| 6.0 | | 20–24 | | 5.8 |
| 4.3 | | 15–19 | | 4.0 |
| 3.6 | | 10–14 | | 3.5 |
| 3.4 | | 5–9 | | 3.2 |
| 3.7 | | 0–4 | | 3.5 |

As of 2016, Jahrom has a population of 141,634, in 25,946 families. Jahrom is the largest city in the southern half of Fars province, the second one in the whole province, and the 67th most populated city in Iran. As of the same year, the city had a population density of 4,754 inhabitants per square kilometre (12,310/sq mi) and +11.38% population growth; while Jahrom County had a population of 228,532 inhabitants; which decreased to 186,269 after the promotion of Khafr District to Khafr County in 2019.

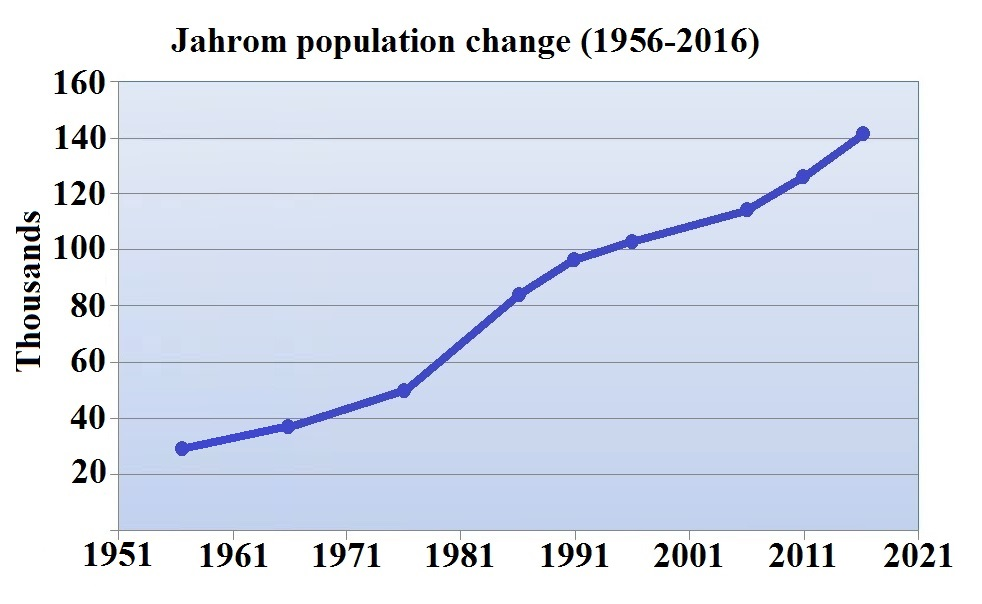
Jahrom population change

Historical population
| Year | Pop. | ±% |
|---|---|---|
| 1956 | 29,913 | — |
| 1966 | 39,354 | +31.6% |
| 1976 | 50,333 | +27.9% |
| 1986 | 83,478 | +65.9% |
| 1991 | 96,690 | +15.8% |
| 1996 | 103,627 | +7.2% |
| 2006 | 116,562 | +12.5% |
| 2011 | 127,159 | +9.1% |
| 2016 | 141,634 | +11.4% |

At the time of the 2006 National Census, the city's population was 103,023 in 25,946 households. The following census in 2011 counted 114,108 people in 32,766 households. The 2016 census measured the population of the city as 141,634 people in 43,349 households.

=== Ethnicity ===
The main ethnic group in Jahrom consists of Persians, while Basseries and Arabs constitute small minorities. They had nomadic life and later sedentism. Due to the geographical characteristics of Jahrom, specially good Rangeland for nomads, Jahrom has long been a residing area for these nomadic peoples.

=== Language ===
People in Jahrom speak Persian language. They have a special accent which is closely related to Middle Persian. The most significant sign of Jahromi accent is dropping the last letter in words ending in vowels.

Following is an example of a Jahromi poem:

| English | Jahromi | Romanization | Standard Persian |
|---|---|---|---|
| Do not fire leaves of the palm tree, they used to be her hair. They were her beautiful green hair hanging from her head. | پیش تَرُک، تش نزنین زلف سرش بوده یه وخت گیس قشنگ سبز او تا کمرش بوده یه وَخت | Pīše tarok taš nazanīn zolfe sareš bude ye vaxt Gīse qašange sabze u tā kamareš bude ye vaxt | برگ‌های نخل را آتش نزنید چرا که روزی گیسوانش بوده‌اند گیسوان قشنگ و سبز آن که تا کمرش می‌آمده‌اند |

=== Religion ===
The majority of city are Shia Muslims, but there is also a small Immigrant Sunni minority in the city. Religion conversion from Zoroastrianism to Islam occurred after Muslims conquer in 641 or 644 AD. Before that era, Zoroastrianism was the dominant religion of Jahrom as the other parts of the Sassanid Iran. According to Ibn Hawqal, in his day (the late tenth century), the people of Jahrom followed Mu'tazilism Jahrom also had a small Jewish community all of whom migrated to Shiraz and Israel in the past decades. After the establishment of Baháʼí Faith in 1863, a significant Baháʼí community formed in Jahrom, some of whom were killed during anti-Baháʼí rebellions and now all of them have migrated.

== Geography ==
=== Location ===
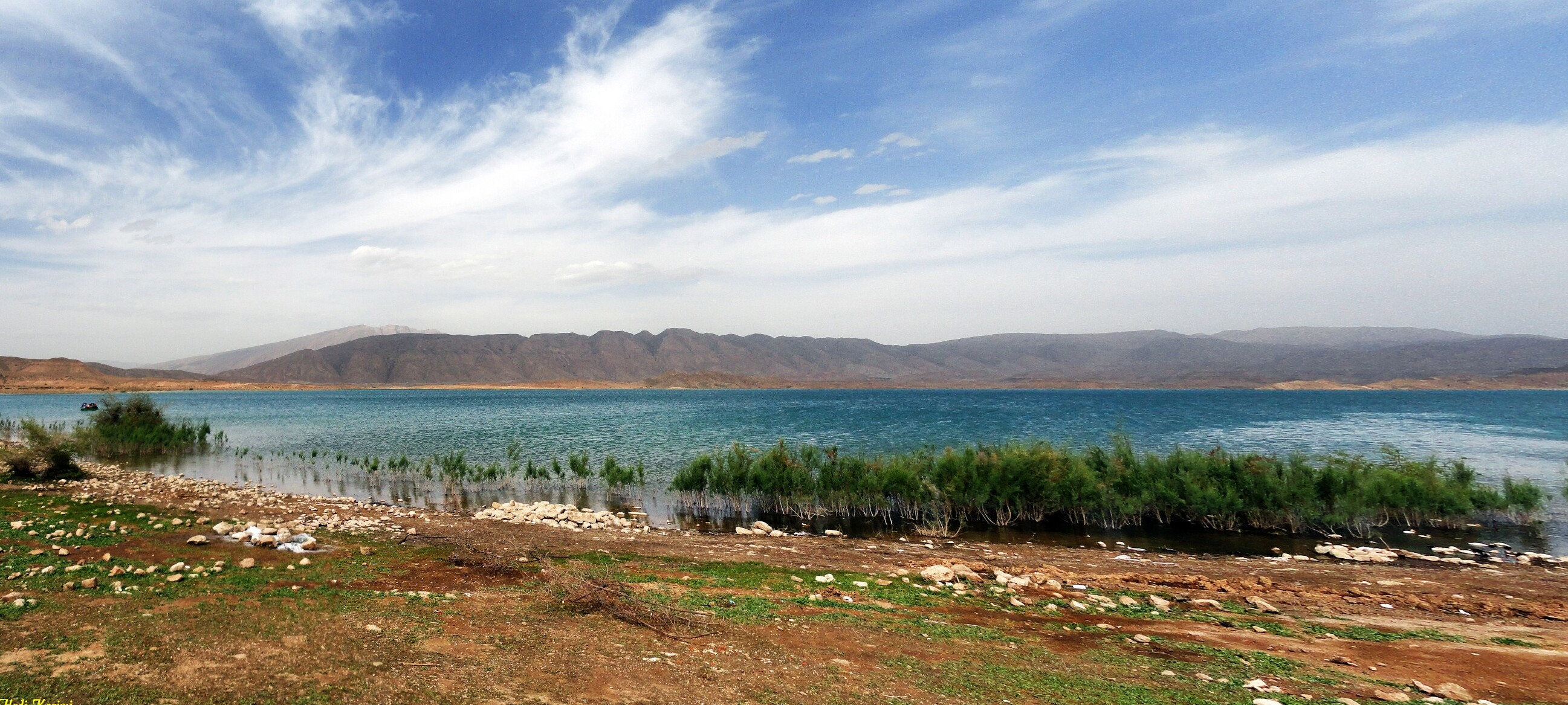
The lake of Salman Farsi Dam

Jahrom, the capital of Jahrom County, is located in the south of Fars province. The county has an area of 3,962 square kilometres (1,530 sq mi), Khafr County borders it to the north, Fasa and Zarrindasht Counties borders it to the east, Larestan County borders it to the south, and Firuzabad and Qir and Karzin Counties borders it to the west.

About four-fifths of the area of Jahrom County is mountainous and the rest is consist of plains. The heights are parts of Zagros Mountains. The average height of the city is about 1,050 metres (3,440 ft), the highest point of the county is the "Sepidar peak" between Khafr county and Simkan district which is about 3,170 metres (10,400 ft), and the lowest point is about 850 metres (2,790 ft) in Simkan district. Qare Aghaj, Shoor and Simakan are among the rivers of Jahrom County. Salman Farsi Dam is located 40 kilometres (25 mi) west of Jahrom.

=== Climate ===
Jahrom has a hot semi-arid climate (Köppen climate classification: BSh); The average rainfall is about 285 millimetres (11.2 in) per year. The average temperature in this city is about 20 °C (68 °F). The maximum temperature in summer reaches 45 °C (113 °F) and the minimum temperature in winter reaches −5 °C (23 °F).

Climate data for Jahrom
| Month | Jan | Feb | Mar | Apr | May | Jun | Jul | Aug | Sep | Oct | Nov | Dec | Year |
|---|---|---|---|---|---|---|---|---|---|---|---|---|---|
| Record high °C (°F) | 27.8 (82.0) | 26.4 (79.5) | 33.0 (91.4) | 35.0 (95.0) | 41.4 (106.5) | 45.0 (113.0) | 45.4 (113.7) | 45.2 (113.4) | 43.6 (110.5) | 38.6 (101.5) | 34.2 (93.6) | 27.4 (81.3) | 45.4 (113.7) |
| Mean daily maximum °C (°F) | 16.5 (61.7) | 17.2 (63.0) | 21.2 (70.2) | 25.8 (78.4) | 33.0 (91.4) | 38.4 (101.1) | 40.5 (104.9) | 39.7 (103.5) | 37.5 (99.5) | 33.1 (91.6) | 26.3 (79.3) | 19.5 (67.1) | 29.1 (84.4) |
| Daily mean °C (°F) | 9.5 (49.1) | 10.2 (50.4) | 13.7 (56.7) | 17.9 (64.2) | 24.1 (75.4) | 28.6 (83.5) | 31.6 (88.9) | 31.1 (88.0) | 28.3 (82.9) | 23.4 (74.1) | 17.4 (63.3) | 11.9 (53.4) | 20.7 (69.3) |
| Mean daily minimum °C (°F) | 2.4 (36.3) | 3.2 (37.8) | 6.3 (43.3) | 10.1 (50.2) | 15.2 (59.4) | 18.8 (65.8) | 22.8 (73.0) | 22.6 (72.7) | 19.1 (66.4) | 13.7 (56.7) | 8.4 (47.1) | 4.4 (39.9) | 12.3 (54.1) |
| Record low °C (°F) | −5.2 (22.6) | −5.0 (23.0) | −2.0 (28.4) | −2.2 (28.0) | 5.5 (41.9) | 10.0 (50.0) | 14.0 (57.2) | 15.0 (59.0) | 10.0 (50.0) | 6.0 (42.8) | −2.0 (28.4) | −3.8 (25.2) | −5.2 (22.6) |
| Average precipitation mm (inches) | 67.2 (2.65) | 64.7 (2.55) | 41.4 (1.63) | 28.8 (1.13) | 5.1 (0.20) | 0.3 (0.01) | 0.6 (0.02) | 3.5 (0.14) | 0.9 (0.04) | 0.9 (0.04) | 11.0 (0.43) | 60.3 (2.37) | 284.7 (11.21) |
| Average precipitation days (≥ 1.0 mm) | 5 | 5 | 4 | 4 | 1 | 0 | 0 | 1 | 0 | 0 | 2 | 4 | 27 |
| Average relative humidity (%) | 64 | 62 | 57 | 51 | 40 | 31 | 30 | 32 | 34 | 37 | 48 | 60 | 46 |
| Mean monthly sunshine hours | 212.6 | 223.9 | 239.1 | 263.5 | 310.8 | 349.1 | 334.7 | 323.5 | 325.2 | 297.5 | 253.0 | 214.2 | 3,347 |
Source: Fars province Meteorological Organization

== Economic ==
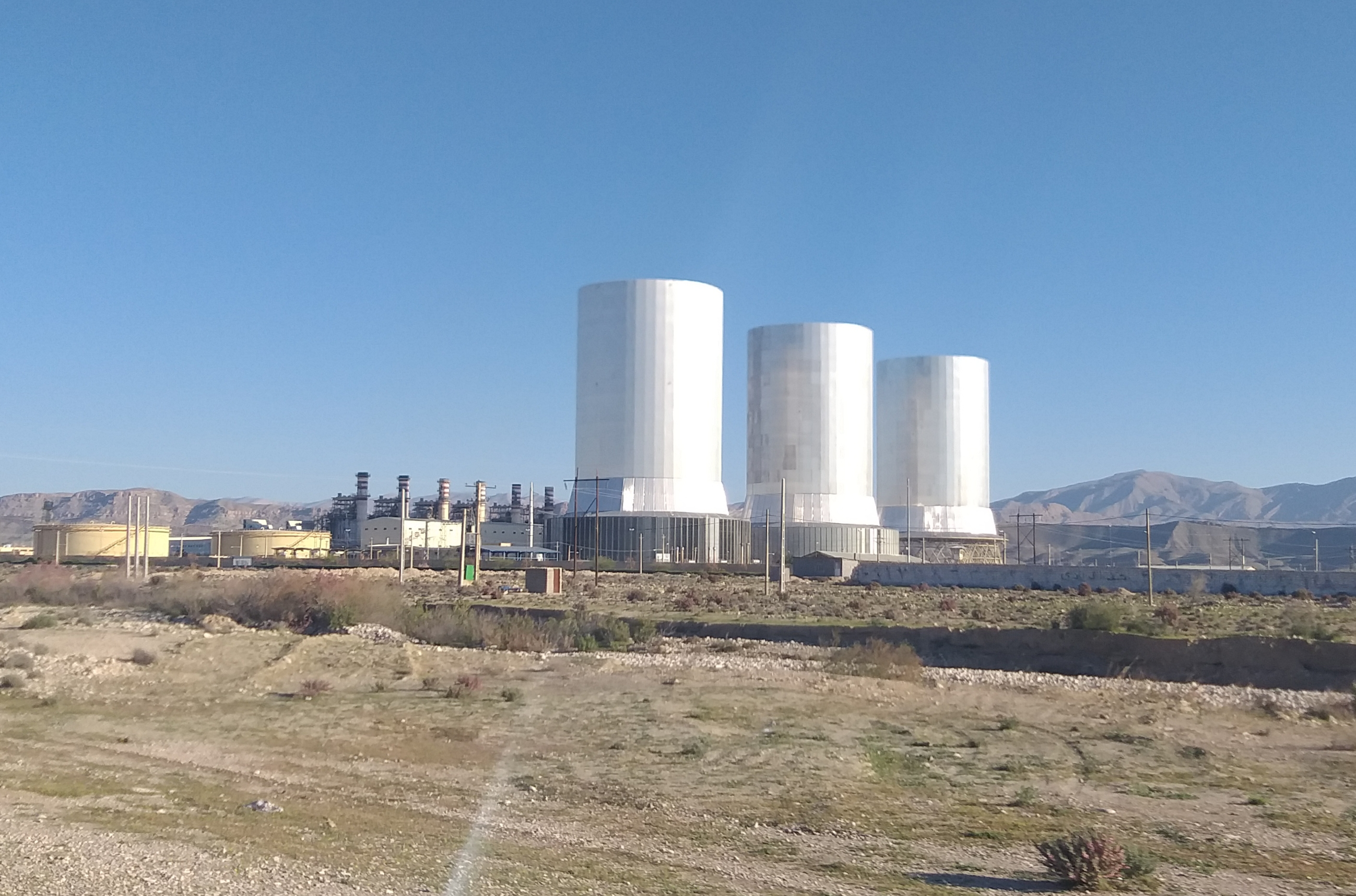
Jahrom combined cycle power plant

Jahrom's economic is based on agriculture. there are 350,000 palm trees and 5.3 million citrus trees in Jahrom which makes Jahrom an agricultural pole in Iran. Jahrom produces 1.2% of the world's dates and 6% of its citrus fruits every year. Shahani is the most well-known date cultivar of Jahrom. Jahrom is also the biggest Citrus limetta producer of the world.

Jahrom has several factories including flour, dairy, brick, rug, plaster, plastic, jam, lemon juice, macaroni and cake factory. Jahrom is also the citrus sorting hub of Iran. charcoal is also produced in large amounts in Jahrom.

=== Products ===
Dates, especially cultivars like Shahani, Rotab, Qasb and Kharak; and also citruses like lemon, orange, tangerine, citrus limetta, bitter orange, and citron are the most well-known products of Jahrom. orange blossom, lemon juice, and date-based sweets like Ranginak and different halvas are also produced in Jahrom. Giveh, carpet, felt, kilim, cuprous dishes, and wickers are handicrafts of the city. Jahromi Gheimeh is a special Gheimeh cooked in Jahrom.

=== Infrastructure ===
- Jahrom combined cycle power plant
- Jahrom Petrochemistry
- Jahrom especial economic zone
- Jahrom economic town
- Kosar economic town

== Education ==
=== Colleges and Universities ===
Jahrom has several academic centers and there is about 20,000 students in its universities. The first higher education center in Jahrom was the Teacher Training University, which was established in 1956. The basic sciences school of Jahrom was established in 1973 and the medical school in 1977. Later in 2011 and 2007 they were promoted to Jahrom University and Jahrom University of Medical Sciences. Islamic Azad University of Jahrom was established in 1988 and Payame-Noor university in 1989.

the higher education centers of Jahrom include:

- Jahrom University
- Jahrom University of Medical Sciences
- Islamic Azad University, Jahrom Branch
- Payame-Noor university of Jahrom
- Andisheh College
- University of Applied Science and Technology, Agriculture College of Jahrom

== Health ==
Jahrom with several hospitals and medical centers is a medical hub in Fars province and Southern Iran. The sterilization center and the Cleanroom of the Southern Iran are located in Jahrom. There is also a Health Technology Development Center in the city.

=== Hospitals ===
- Peymanieh hospital
- Motahhari hospital
- Seyyedosh-shohada hospital
- Aboutalebi heart hospital
- Rahmanian psychiatric hospital

=== Medical centers ===
- Khatam ol-Anbia Cancer center
- Javad ol-Aemeh Chemotherapy center
- Honari Infertility Center
- Hakim Salman Infertility Center
- Honari speciality clinic
- Emam Reza speciality clinic
- Dental speciality clinic

== Transport and communications ==
=== Communication roads ===
The most important roads in Jahrom are:

- Jahrom-Shiraz highway
- Jahrom-Lar under construction highway
- Jahrom-Fasa road
- Jahrom-Qir road
- Jahrom-Khavaran-Sarvestan road
- Jahrom-Hakan road
- Jahrom-Simakan-Meymand road

=== Airport ===
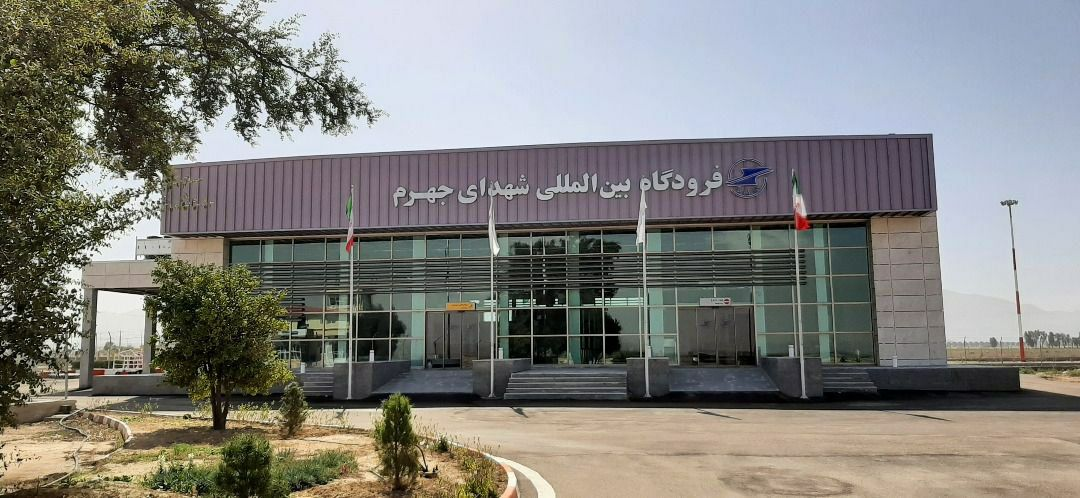
Jahrom International Airport

Jahrom International Airport, established in 1969, has 4 weekly flights to Tehran Mehrabad International Airport, Mashhad International Airport and Chabahar Konarak Airport.

The flights to Tehran are carried out on Saturdays and Mondays.

=== Railway ===
There is an under construction railway project Connecting Shiraz to Bandar abbas which will have a station in Jahrom.

=== Bus terminal ===
Shahid Rahmanian is the bus terminal of Jahrom with daily buses to Shiraz, Tehran, Isfahan, Bandar Abbas, Lar, etc.

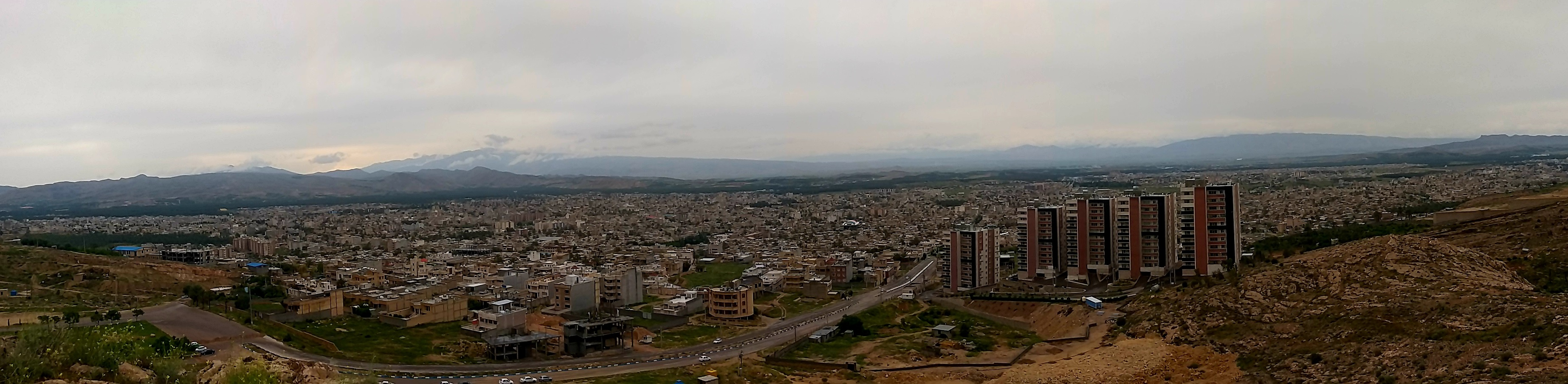
A panorama of Jahrom near Kuhsar park

== Notable people ==
- Barbad, one of the first musicians in the world
- Mohammad-Javad Azari Jahromi, Iranian Minister of Information and Communications Technology
- Mohammad Jahromi, former Iranian minister of labour and social affairs
- Ali Mohammad Besharati, former Iranian Minister of Interior
- Mehdi Shabzendedar Jahromi, Iranian Shia jurist and member of the Guardian Council
- Seyyed Hossein ayatollahi, Shiite clergyman and Ruhollah Khomeini's Representative in jahrom.
- Abd al-Husayn Lari, clergymen and jurists of South Iran
- Lotfollah Dezhkam, Ayatollah, Friday leading prayer of Shiraz and Representative of Guardian of the Islamic Jurist in Fars province
- Sayyid Abdul-Nabi Mousavi Fard, Ayatollah, Friday leading prayer of Ahwaz and Representative of Guardian of the Islamic Jurist in Khuzestan province
- Mohammad Reza Rezaei Kouchi, Representative of Iranian parliament and head of the civil commission of the parliament
- Ali-Mohammad Khademi, former general manager of Iran Air
- Ali Torab Jahromi, Iranian poet
- Ali Mohammad Haghshenas, Iranian linguist

== Gallery ==
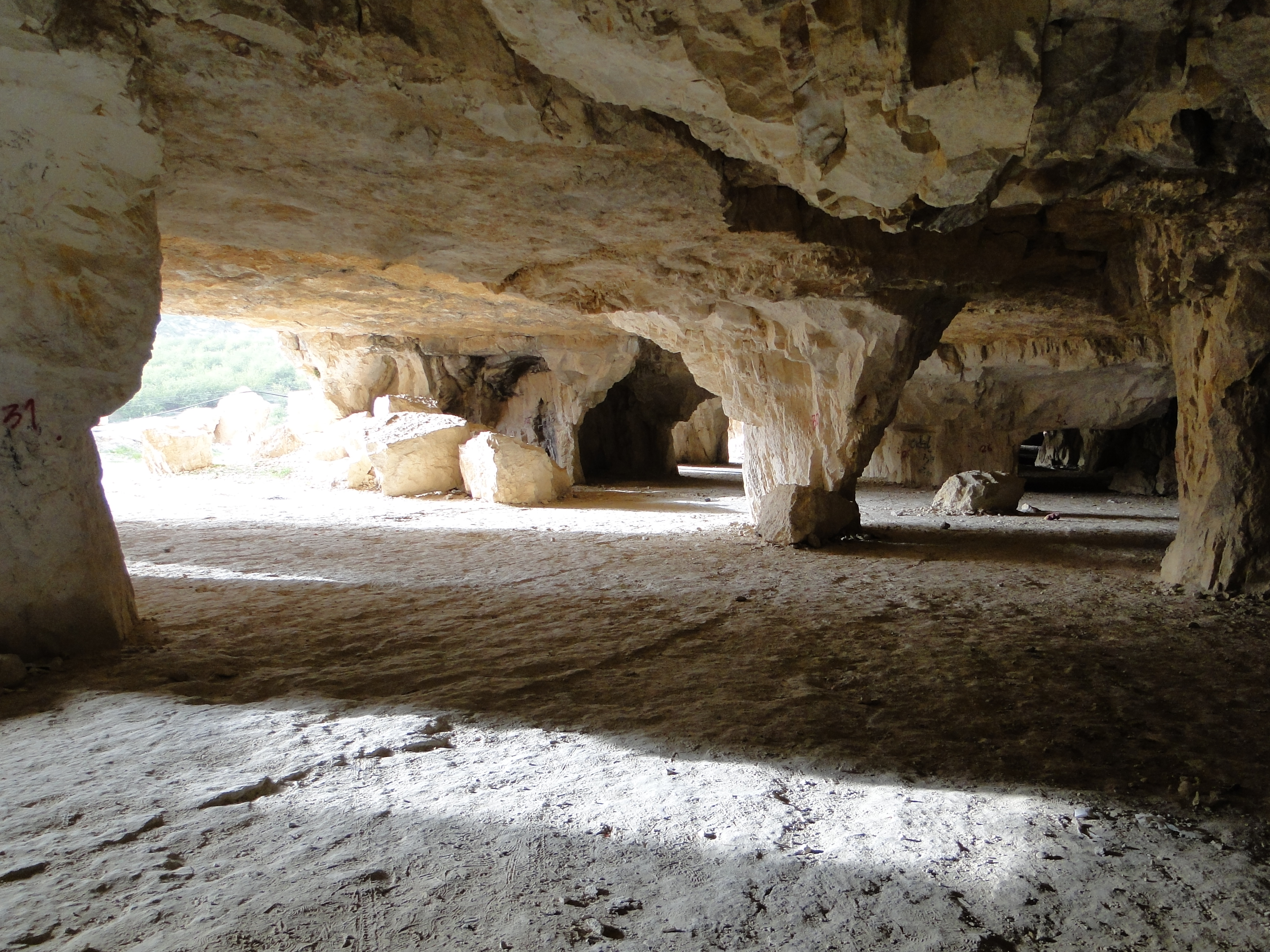
Inside of Sangtarashan cave

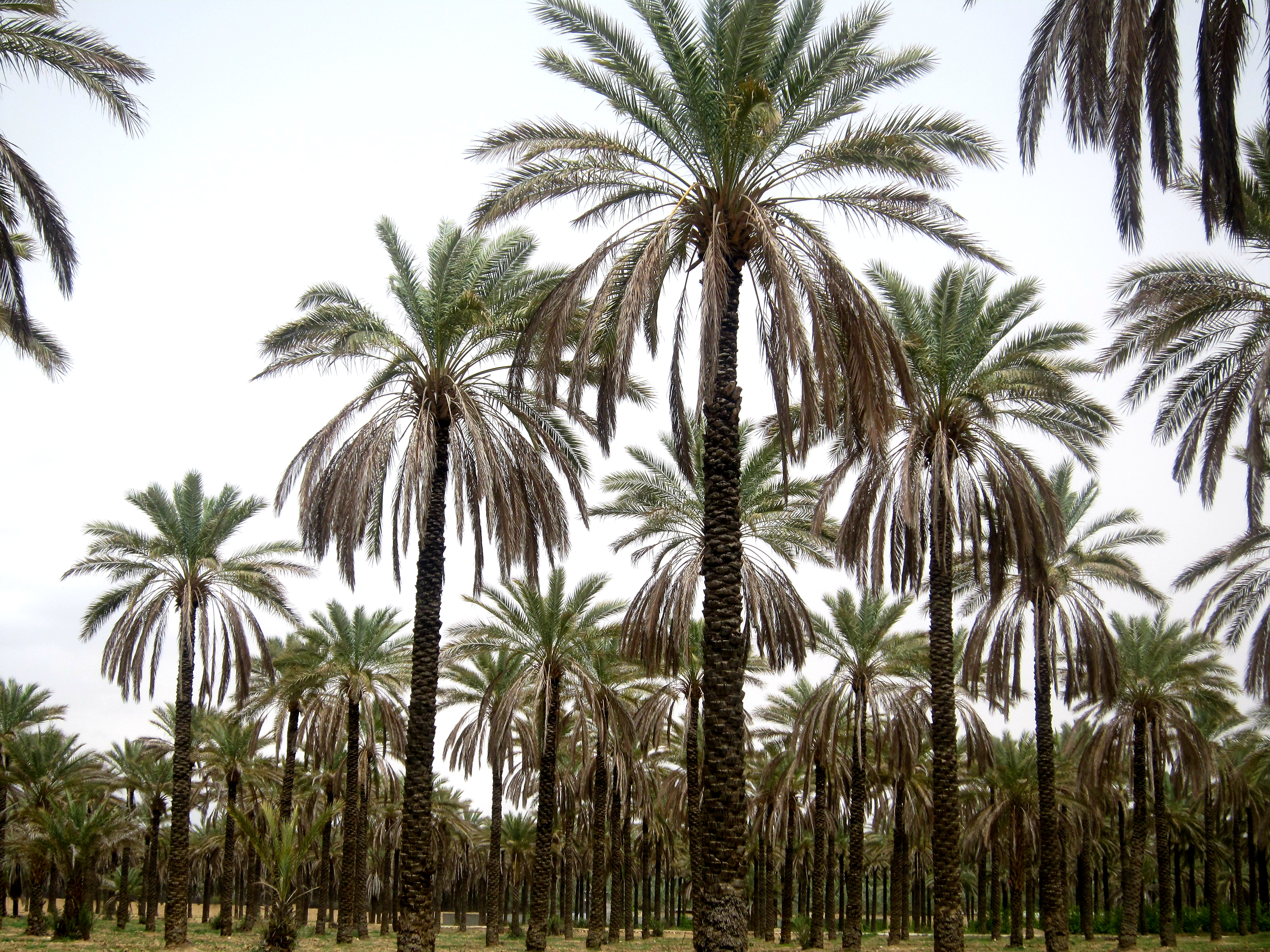
Palm trees in Jahrom

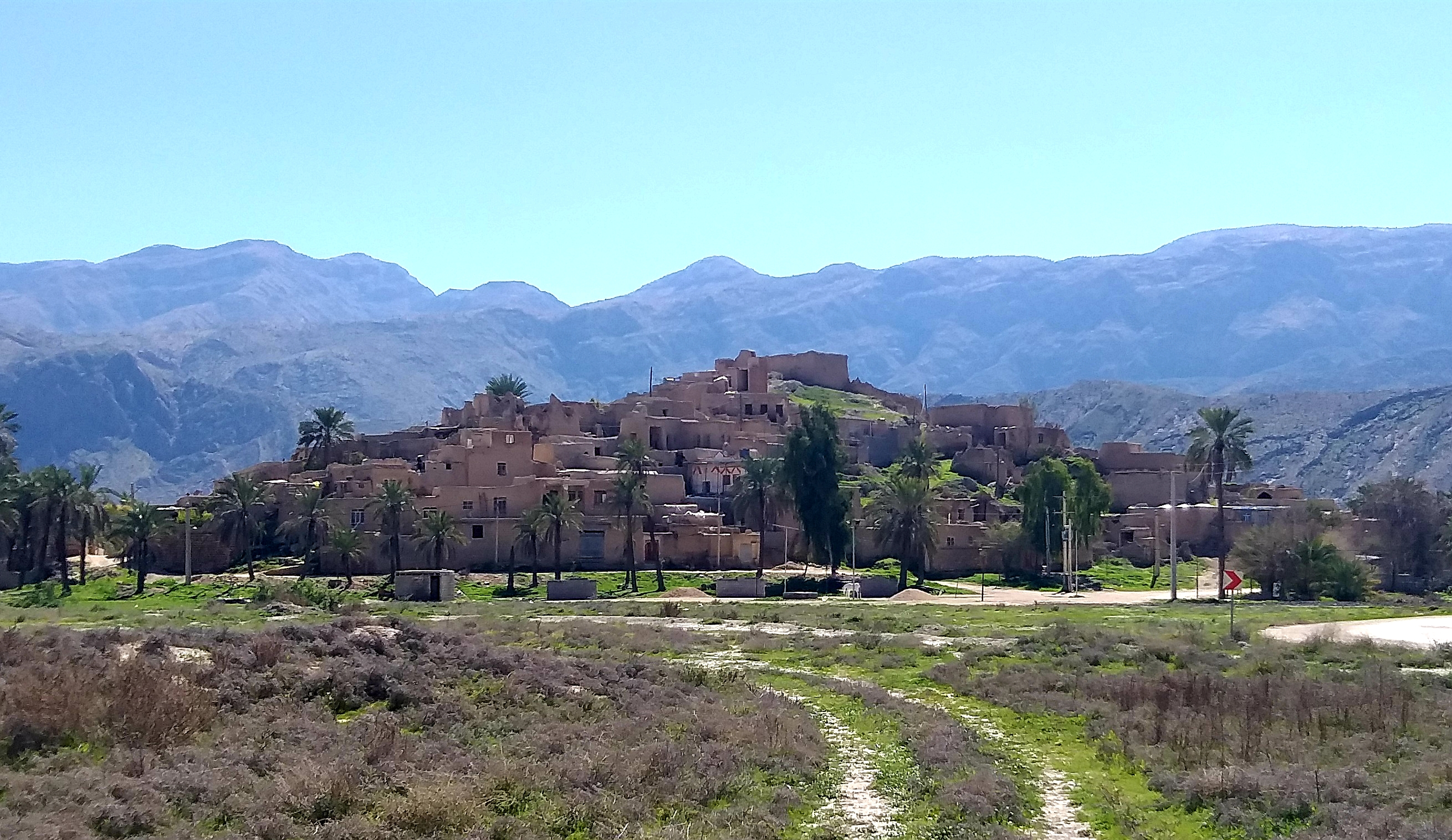
Qalat, Jahrom

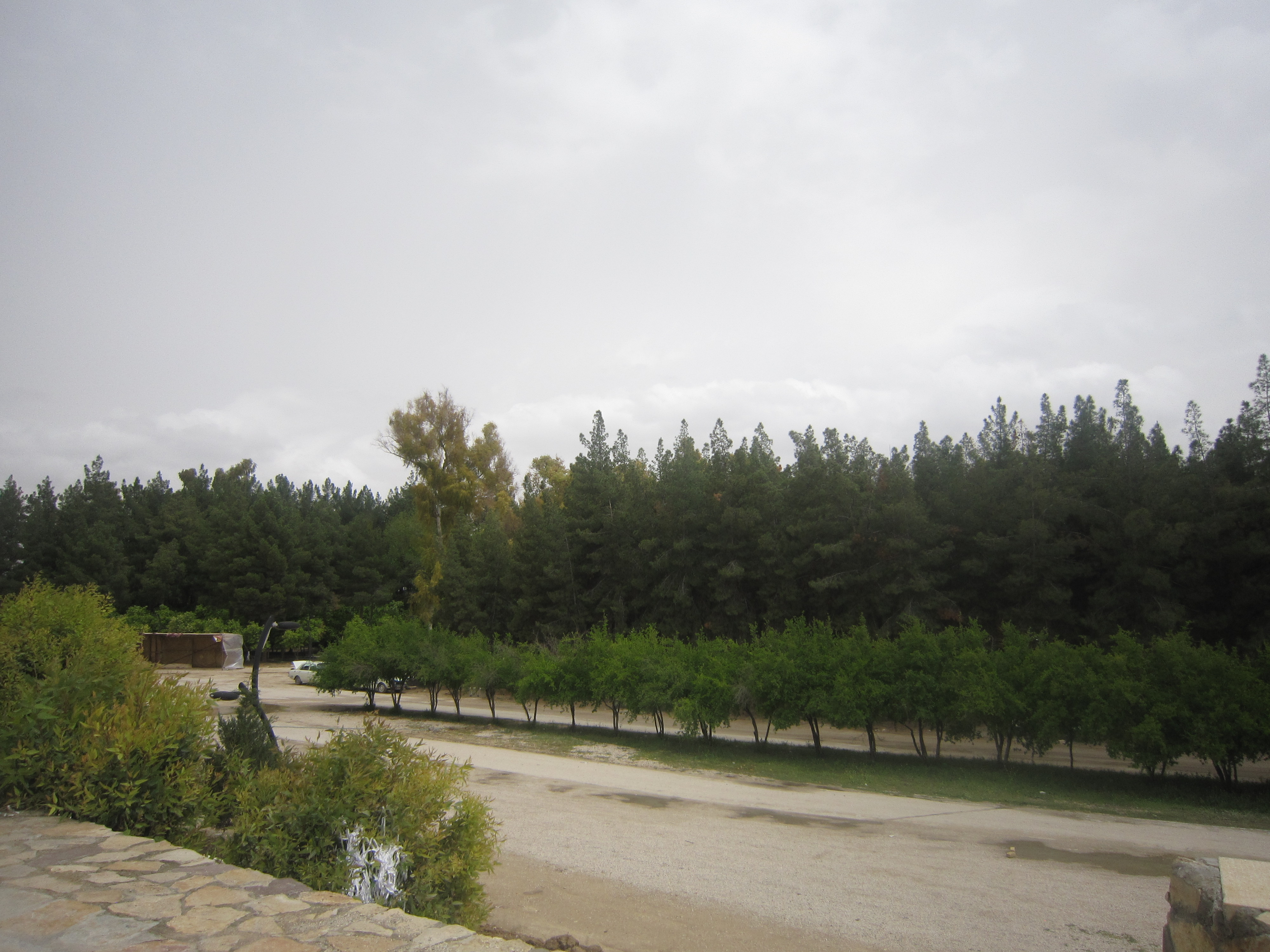
City park

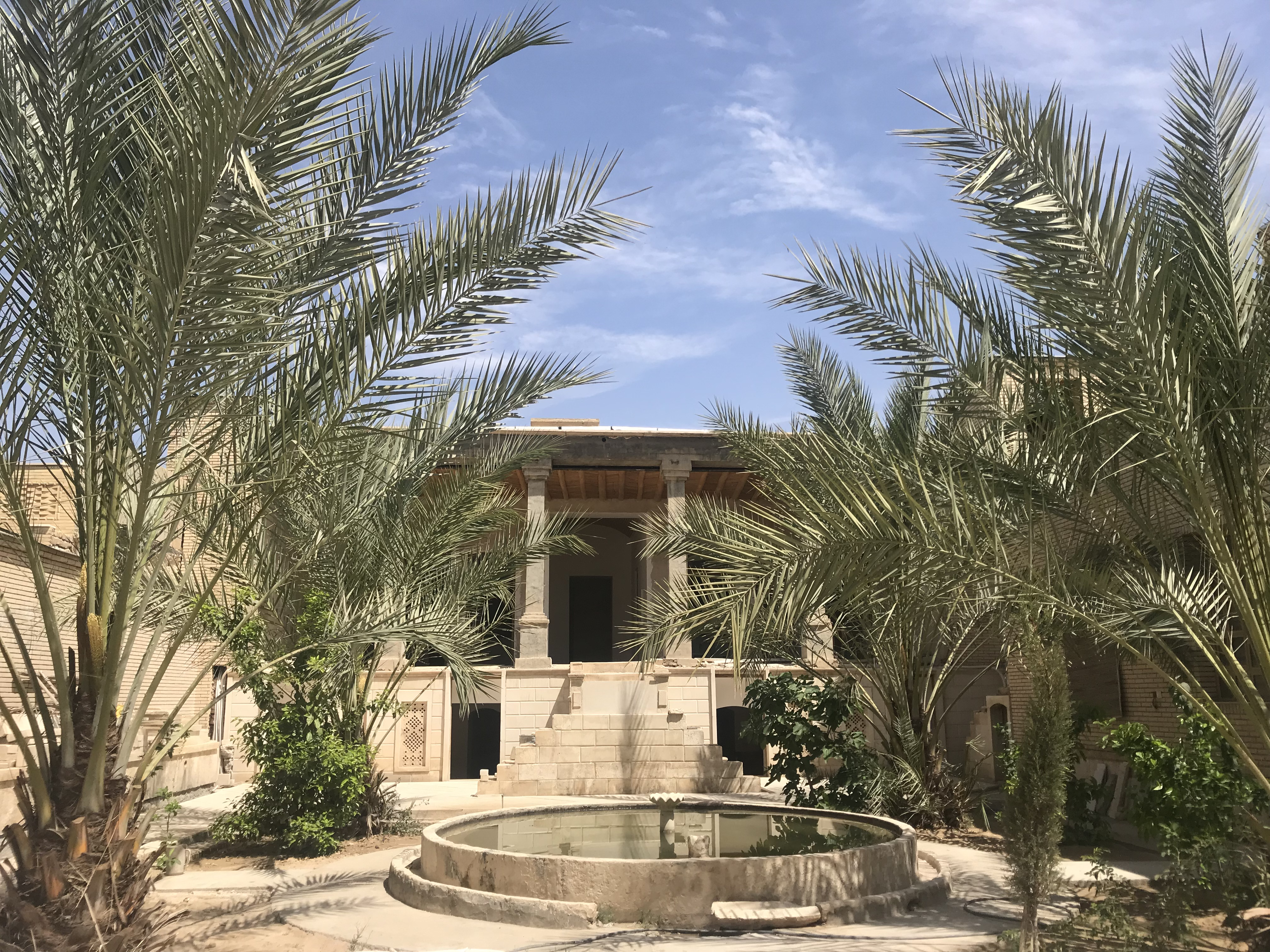
House of Toufan

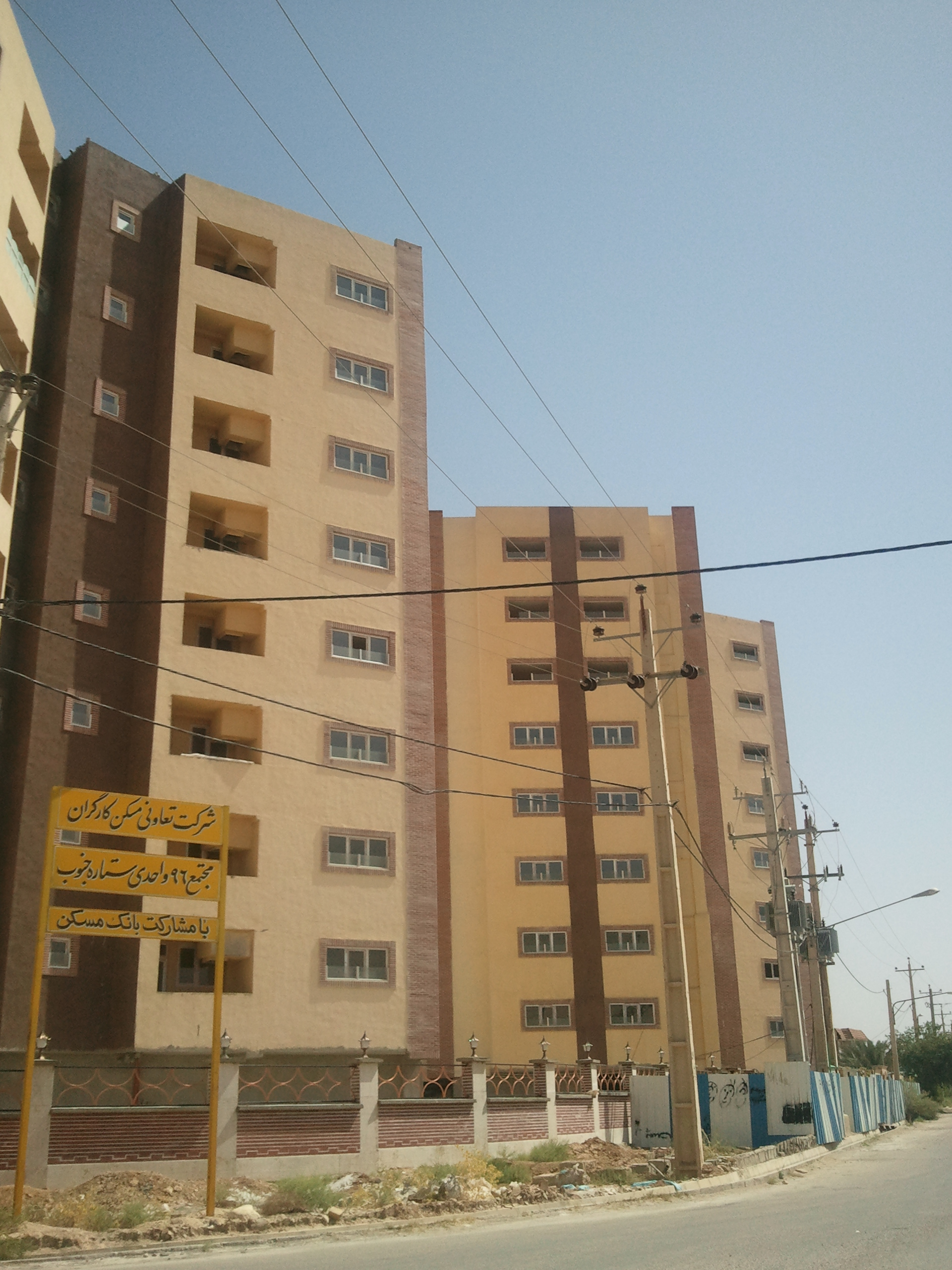
Buildings in Jahrom

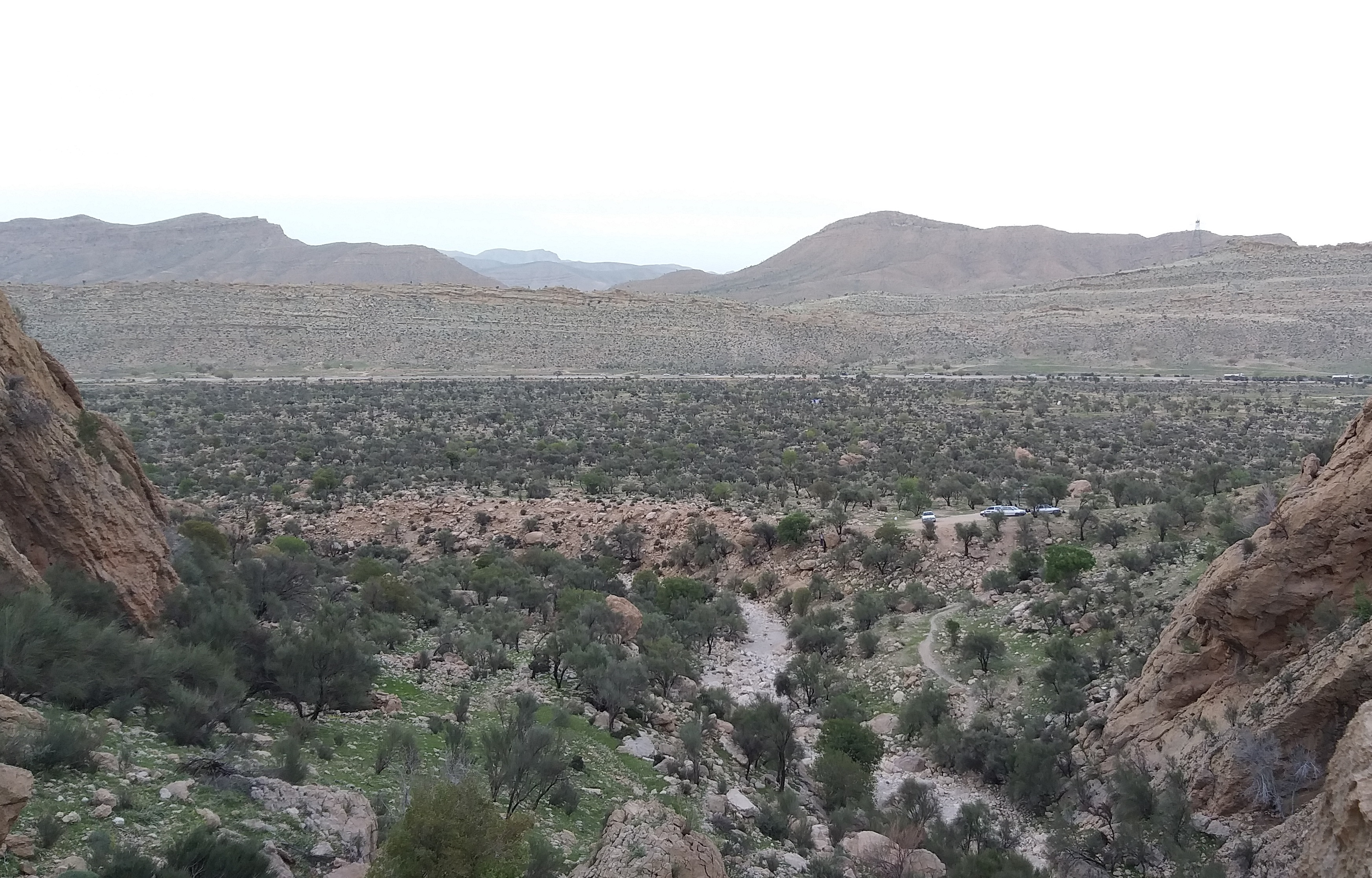
Chatiz forest

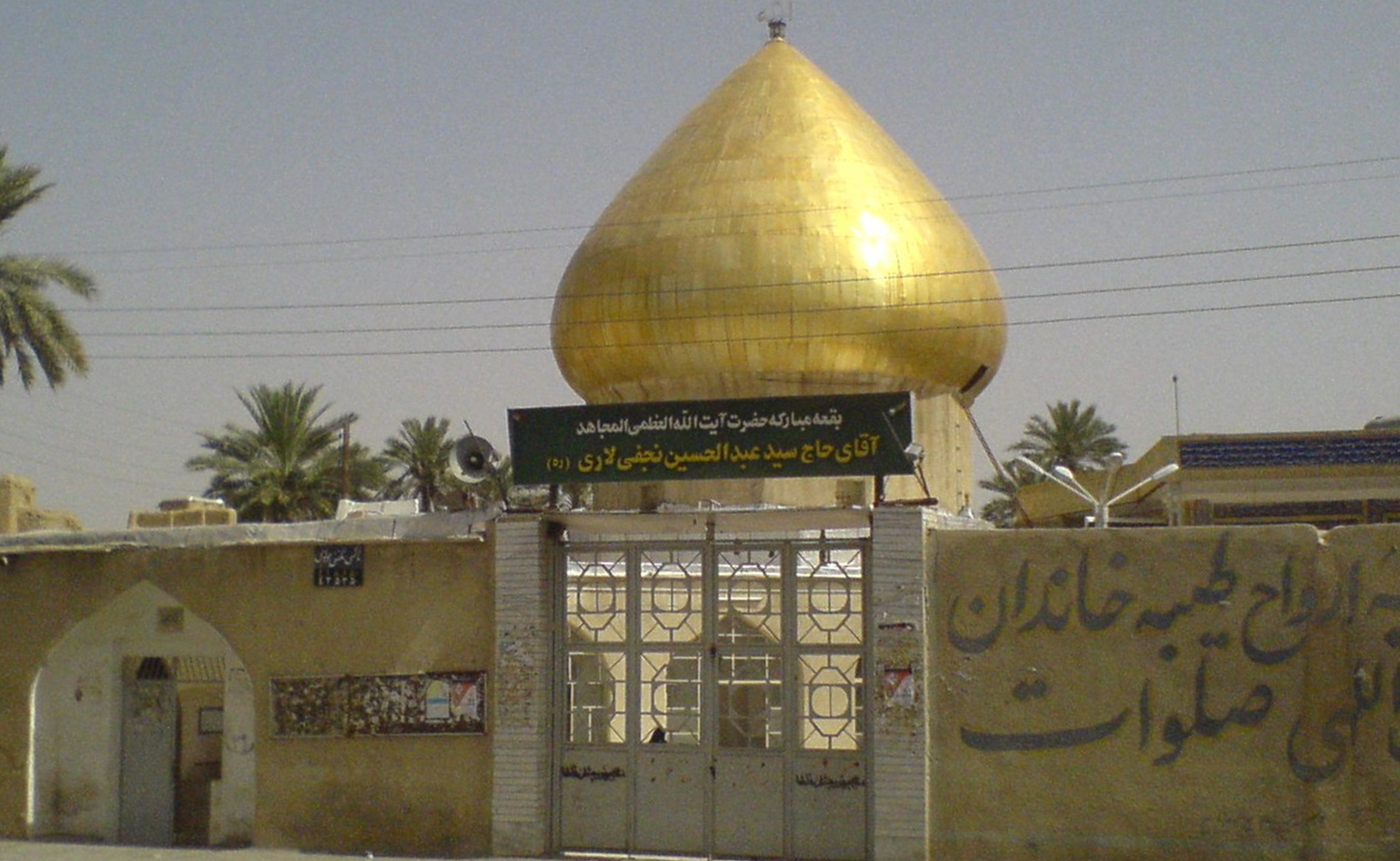
Shrine of Abd al-Husayn Lari

Media related to Jahrom at Wikimedia Commons

Jahrom travel guide from Wikivoyage
