= Jahrom International Airport =

Jahrom International Airport فرودگاه بین‌المللی جهرم
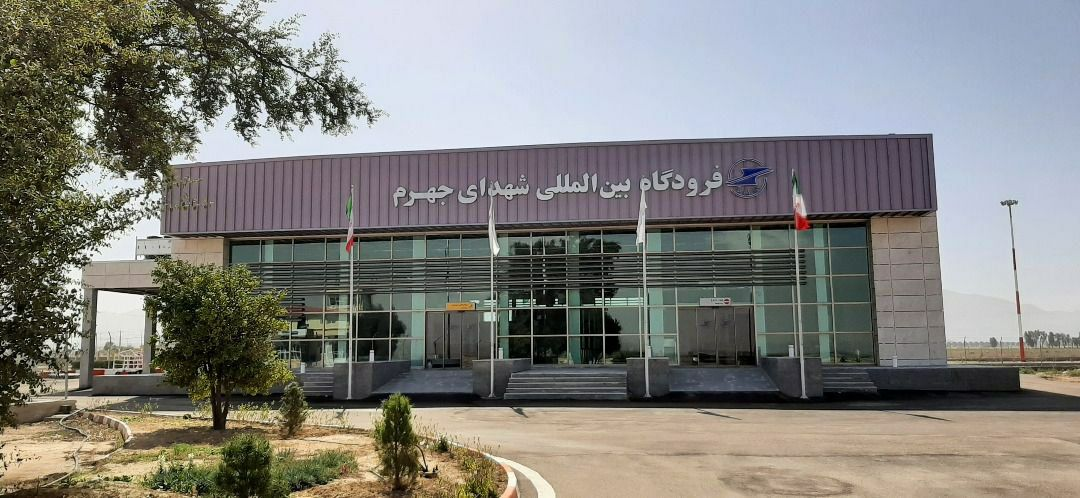
- IATA: JAR; ICAO: OISJ

Summary
- Airport type: Public
- Owner: Government of Iran
- Operator: Iran Airports Company
- Serves: Jahrom, Fars
- Location: Jahrom, Iran
- Elevation AMSL: 3,358 ft / 1,024 m
- Coordinates: 28°35′12″N 053°34′45″E

Map
- Location of airport in Iran

Runways
Direction	Length		Surface
Direction	ft	m	Surface
08/26	7,899	2,408	Asphalt

Statistics (2019)
- Aircraft movements: 246 ▲22%
- Passengers: 8627 ▲24%
- Cargo: 85 Tons ▲35%
- Sources: World Aero Data; Iran Airports Company

Jahrom International Airport (Persian: فرودگاه بین‌المللی جهرم) (IATA: JAR, ICAO: OISJ) is an airport in Jahrom, Fars province, Iran. It was established in 1969.

Currently, it hosts three regular flights per week from and to the capital city of Tehran on Saturdays, Mondays and Wednesdays.

The flight from Jahrom to Tehran takes around two hours.

== Airlines and destinations ==
Airlines	Destinations
Iran Air	Tehran–Mehrabad
