= Ali Mohammad Haghshenas =

Iranian linguist

Ali Mohammad Haghshenas Lari
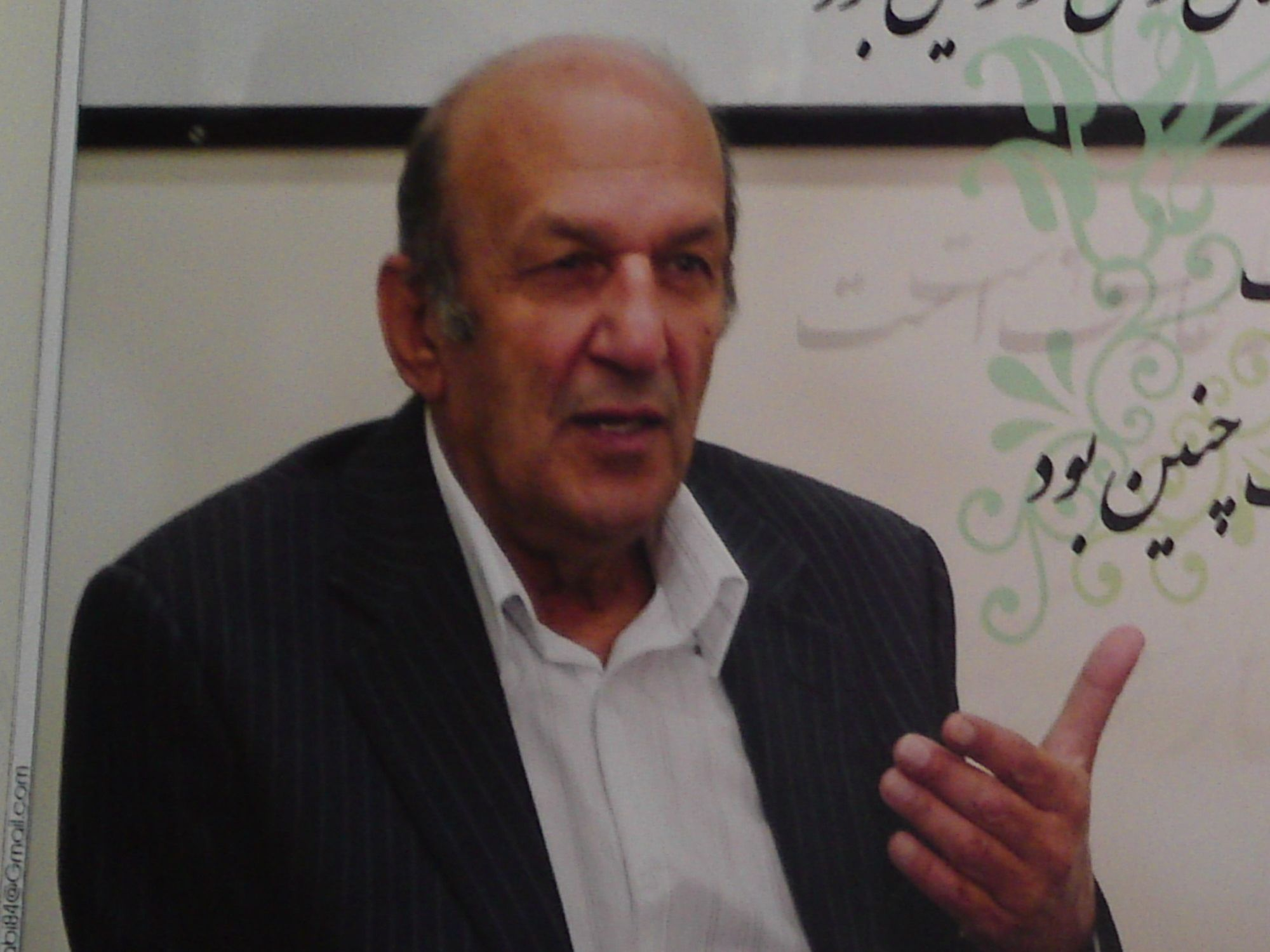
- Born: May 4, 1940; Jahrom, Fars province, Iran
- Died: April 30, 2010 (aged 69); Tehran, Tehran province, Iran
- Education: SOAS, University of London (PhD)
- Awards: Iran's Book of the Year Award
- Scientific career
- Fields: Phonetics
- Institutions: University of Tehran
- Thesis: A Phonetic and Phonological Study of the Nominal Piece in Standard Colloquial Persian (1971)
- Doctoral advisor: Natalie Waterson
- Doctoral students: Kourosh Safavi
- Other notable students: Ali Darzi

Ali Mohammad Haghshenas (May 4, 1940 – April 30, 2010) was an Iranian linguist and emeritus professor of linguistics at the University of Tehran. He was a winner of Iran's Book of the Year Award.

== Books ==
- Phonetics, Tehran: Agah
- Farhang e Hezareh, Tehran: Farhang-e Moaser
