= Bazaar of Jahrom =

Historical Bazaar located in Iran

Coordinates: 28°30′05″N 53°33′12″E

Jahrom Bazaar
- بازارِ جهرم
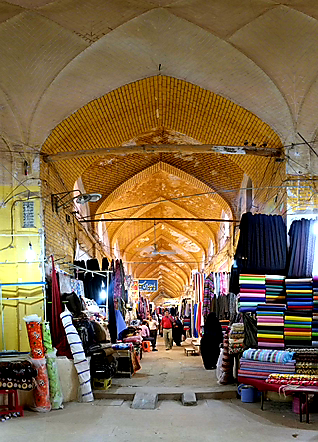

General information
- Architectural style: Persian
- Location: Jahrom, Iran

Jahrom Bazaar (Persian: بازار جهرم) is a bazaar in Jahrom, Iran. The bazaar was designed in Zand period in the style of the Vakil Bazaar, and it is indicative of the region's robust economy during the Qajar period. It is considered as one of the most valuable and best examples of Zand architecture, with its high dome of the Chaharsouq. Jahrom Bazaar has 3 caravanserais.

Jahrom bazaar is listed as one of the first sites in the Iran National Heritage List with registration number of 950 in 1973.

== See also ==
- Iranian architecture
- Bazaar
