= Salman Farsi Dam =

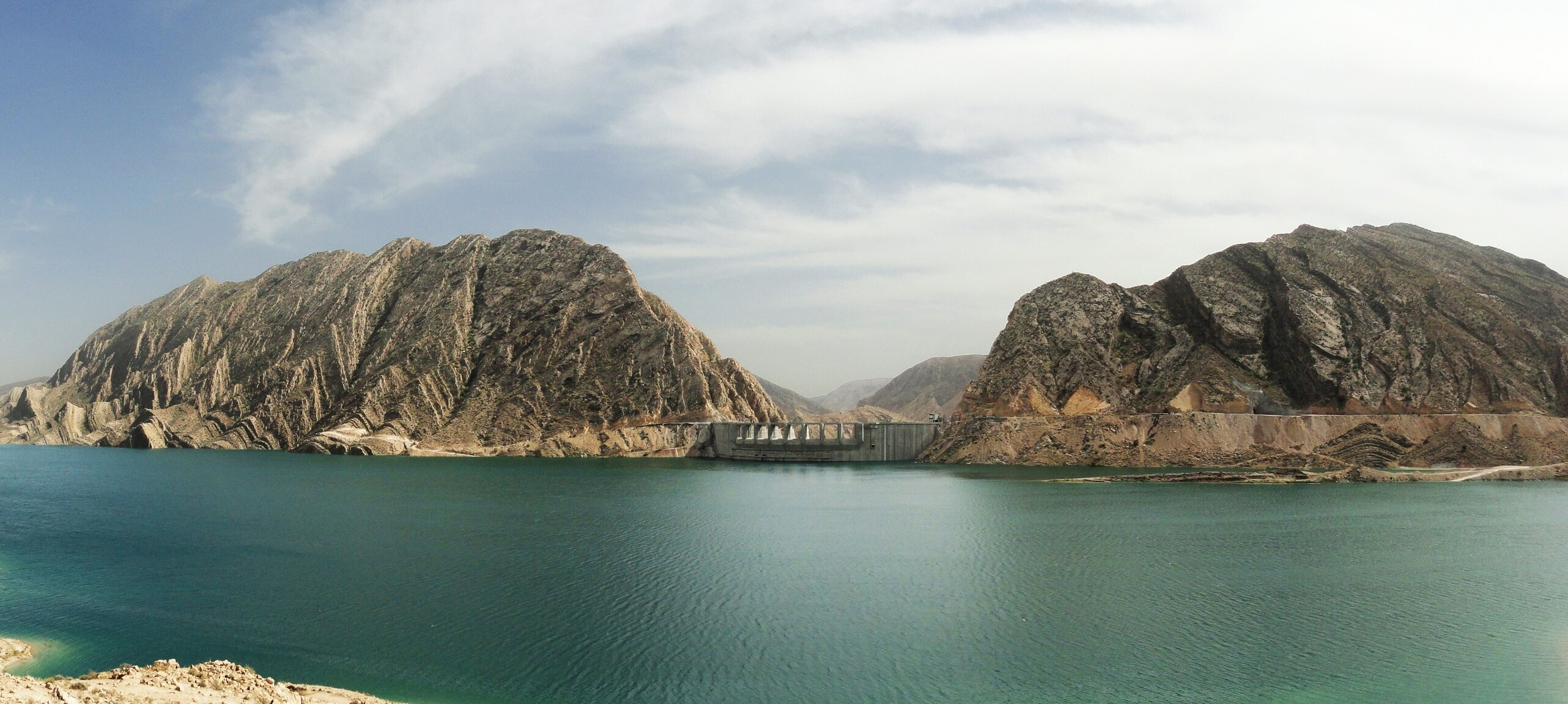

- Location within Iran
- Country: Iran
- Location: Qir, Jahrom
- Coordinates: 28°32′1.77″N 53°7′13.56″E
- Construction began: 1995
- Opening date: 2009

Dam and spillways
- Impounds: Qare Aghaj River
- Height: 125 m (410 ft)
- Length: 351 m (1,152 ft)
- Width (crest): 7 m (23 ft)

Reservoir
- Total capacity: 1,400,000,000 m^{3} (1.831130867×10^{9} cu yd)

Salman Farsi Dam (Persian: سد سلمان فارسی) Salman Farsi Dam is a concrete dam in the center of Fars province on the Qara Aghaj River. This dam has a capacity of 1400 million cubic meters of water storage and is the largest dam in Fars province. Salman Farsi Dam, as the main source Drinking water operates in the southern cities and villages of Fars province and has played a significant role in supplying water to the region, especially in recent years during drought conditions. The crown of the dam is in the city of Qir and Karzin, and its lake, with an area of 4850 hectares, is in the city of Jahrom.

== technical specifications of the dam ==
- dam type: Arch concrete
- The height of the dam from the deepest point of the foundation:125 meters
- The length of the crest of the dam: 345 meters
- The width of the dam at the crown: 7 meters
- The width of the dam (maximum) in the foundation: 63 meters
- The concrete volume of the dam body: 760,000 cubic meters

== See also ==
- List of power stations in Iran
