= Ali-Mohammad Khademi =

Iranian lieutenant general and business executive (1913-1978)

Sardar Ali-Mohammad Khademi
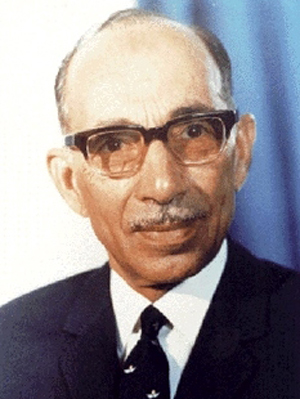
- Born: 24 May 1913; Jahrom, Fars province, Persia
- Died: 7 November 1978 (aged 65) Tehran, Iran
- Allegiance: Iran
- Branch: Imperial Iranian Air Force
- Service years: 1931–1961
- Rank: Sepahbod
- Commands: Chief of Staff of the Imperial Iranian Air Force
- Education: Officers' Academy
- Children: 3
- Other work: Chairman and CEO of Iran Air (1962–1978)

Ali Mohammad Khademi (Persian: سپهبد علی محمد خادمی, 24 May 1913 – 7 November 1978) was the general manager of Iran Air from 1962 until 1978.

== Early life ==
Khademi was born in Jahrom. He studied at the Military Academy and Air Force Flying School in Tehran, British Civil Aviation Authority in London and US Air Force University in Alabama.

According to Persian-language book Tarikhcheh-ye Havapeymai-e Bazargani dar Iran (Abbas Atrvash, 2007), from 1958 Khademi was the chief of staff at Iranian Air Force and from 1962 to 1978 he was the general manager of Iran Air. During his 16-year tenure there, "the company was transformed from a fledgling domestic airline to a thriving national flag-carrier."

Khademi was the president of IATA in 1970–1971.

== Resignation and Assassination ==
Khademi resigned as General Manager (CEO) of Iran Air on 9 September 1978 during rising unrest preceding the Iranian Revolution. He did however Continue briefly as Chairman of its Board until October 1978, until increasing instability forced his departure. On 7 November 1978 he was killed at his home in Tehran, in front of his wife, just two days after martial law was declared.

Initial state-controlled media outlets claimed Khademi took his own life, but the narrative was strongly disputed by both his family and independent forensic accounts. Archival records from the Armed Forces (Dādsetāni file no. 401/68/3060) and the Criminal Court (Kayfari court file no. 193/64) confirm these findings and note that suspects were detained but no prosecutions followed. It is alleged that SAVAK agents where behind the assassination, but no on was ever prosecuted for the killing, and his murder remains unsolved.
