= Naser Divan Kazeruni =

Iranian sheriff (1874–1942)

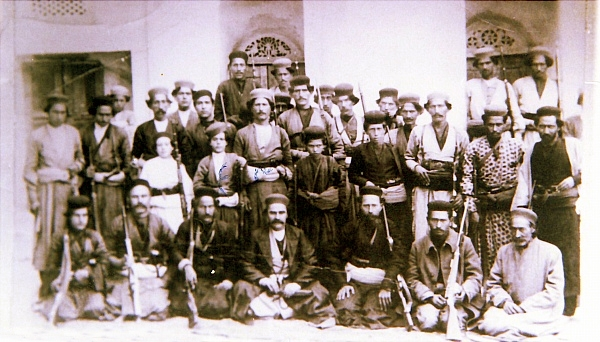
- Naser Divan Kazeruni (seated in the middle) along with a number of fighters from Kazerun and other cities
- Native name: ناصردیوان کازرونی
- Born: 24 December 1874; Kazerun, Qajar Iran
- Died: 29 April 1942 (aged 67) Kazerun, Pahlavi Iran
- Buried: Shah Arqavan, Kazerun, Iran
- Commands: Sheriff of Kazerun, Leader of Kazerun forces
- Conflicts: World War I, (United Kingdom and Iran)
- Children: Hassan Ali Khan, Amrollah Khan, Mohammad Khan, Keramatollah Khan, Musa Khan, Heydar Khan, Yadollah Khan, Amanollah Khan, Khanom Tuba Bibi, Khanom Fatemeh Bibi, Khanom Sediqe, Khanom Sharia't, Khanom Nosrat

Khajeh Abdollah Amirazodi (Persian: خواجه عبدالله امیرعضدی; 24 December 1874 – 29 April 1942), also known as Naser Divan Kazeruni and Naser Lashkar, was the sheriff of Kazerun in Iran in the late Qajar era and the early Pahlavi era who rose against the invasion of Iran by the Allies during World War I and fought against British forces. His numerous wars against the British made him a prominent figure in the movement of southern Iran. The 4th of Dey (25 December), the anniversary of the defeat of the South Persia Rifles by Naser Divan Kazeruni and his comrades, is named Kazerun Day.

== Birth and life ==
Khajeh Abdollah Amirazodi, the son of Khajeh Hassan Ali and Fatemeh Bibi Deylami, was born on 24 September 1874, in Gonbad neighborhood of Kazerun in Iran. His mother was a descendant of 'Adud al-Dawla, the emir of Buyid Empire, and his father and ancestors were appointed to the Kazerun Sheriff. Due to Naser Divan's role in suppressing Khazʽal Ibn Jabir rebellion, Reza Shah awarded him the title of Naser Lashkar (means Army). Naser Divan married 3 times during his life and had 12 children. He was very popular among the people of Kazerun because of his good morals and good deeds. Naser Divan declared war against British soldiers and their dependents when he was the sheriff of Kazerun. His main struggles were with national and patriotic motives and also under the influence of the Fatwas of famous clerics of the time, especially Abd al-Husayn Najafi Lari.

== Start of fighting ==
After signing the Anglo-Russian Convention, the British forces under the leadership of General Percy Sykes disembarked in Bushehr port and planned to leave for Shiraz. Meanwhile, Mirza Ali Kazeruni, who was Bushehr's representative in the National Consultative Assembly in a message to Naser Divan Kazeruni asked him to prevent the passage of British troops. Naser Divan Kazeruni along with a number of fighters of Kazerun blocked the road to the British forces near Kazerun and inflicted a heavy defeat on them, which caused the British forces to temporarily stop their campaign to Shiraz.

== Trying to arrest Naser Divan ==
In 1911, William Frederick Travers O'Connor, the British consul in Shiraz, decided to arrest Naser Divan Kazeruni. He sent a detachment of gendarmes under the command of Capt. Ohlsson, a Swedish officer, to Kazerun. The resistance of people around Naser Divan against his arrest led to a fight and finally Captain Ohlsson was shot dead. In one of the reports of the British Consulate, it is mentioned that Ohlsson was apparently busy installing a bomb in the castle where Naser Divan resides, and he was shot dead.

== Supporting the liberation of Bushehr port ==
Before the operation to liberate Bushehr, a meeting was held with the presence of some prominent freedom fighters to announce their support for this action. Naser Divan Kazeruni, Solat al-Dawla Qashqaei and Wilhelm Wassmuss were among the most prominent people present at the meeting.

== The collapse of the South Persia Rifles base in Kazerun ==
After the establishment of British forces in the south of Iran, units under the title of South Persia Rifles were established in several southern cities of Iran, including Kazerun. Naser Divan Kazeruni was very unhappy about this and finally declared war on them. He said to the people of Kazerun:

I have entered into war against the powerful foreign government [England] with your support [the people of Kazerun]; Because I know that all of you, brave and patriotic, are never satisfied when a stranger sets foot in your city.

Naser Divan, along with some of his riflemen, attacked the South Persia Rifles headquarters in Kazerun and disarmed them, and then arrested Amir Nosrat Nuri, the then governor of Kazerun. Kazeruni forces were able to close the mountain communication road from Shiraz to Bushehr port, which lasted for 3 years. No matter what the British forces stationed in Bushehr tried, they failed to open this road.

On 28 December 1916, five hundred soldiers under the command of the British went from Shiraz to Kazerun to suppress him. But before the British forces reached Kazerun, the fighters of Kazerun blocked the way in the Dasht-e Arzhan area and inflicted a heavy defeat on them. In this battle, Captain Vetikogol, one of the British officials, was also killed. The British decided to send an army from Bushehr to suppress the Kazerunis. But this corps was also besieged by Sheikh Hossein Khan Chah Kutahi and Zair Khezr Khan Ahrami in Chah Kutah area before reaching Kazerun, some of them were killed and some fled towards Bushehr.

== Siege of Shiraz ==
Fighters of Kazerun went to Shiraz after capturing Khaneh Zenyan area and Chenar Rahdar checkpoint. Naser Divan Kazerun and other fighters of Kazerun in an alliance with Sowlat al-Dowla Qashqaei and Qashqaei clan fighters besieged Shiraz to suppress the British forces. and Jannat Garden, the areas of Koshan, Bardi Mosque, and the western part of Shiraz, which were strategic areas and the location of South Persia Rifles forces and British forces, were brought under their influence. However, in the end, due to differences between the heads of the Qashqaei clan and the danger of the fall of Kazerun, Naser Divan left Shiraz and returned to Kazerun.

== Occupation of Kazerun and arrest of Naser Divan ==
Finally, the British forces attacked Kazeroon with their equipped weapons, and in addition to capturing this city, they succeeded in reopening the connection between Shiraz and Bushehr after more than 3 years. Following the capture of Kazeroon, most of the British officials went to this city, including Colonel Everton, Inspector General of the South Persia Rifles, Colonel Hutson, the British Consul in Shiraz, and Generals Douglas and Bill, senior political officers. As a result of this incident, Naser Divan Kazeruni was arrested and after confiscating his property, he was exiled to Fasa city.

== Other people's opinions ==
General Percy Sykes later said this about Naser Divan Kazeruni:

The bravery of Naser Divan and his fighters made us face difficulties on the way to our goals, and this was the only time that the South Persia Rifles failed during their entire service in Iran.

Ayatollah Beladi also said this about Naser Divan:

If it wasn't for Naser Divan's movement, the English gentlemen would have set Fars on fire.

== Death ==
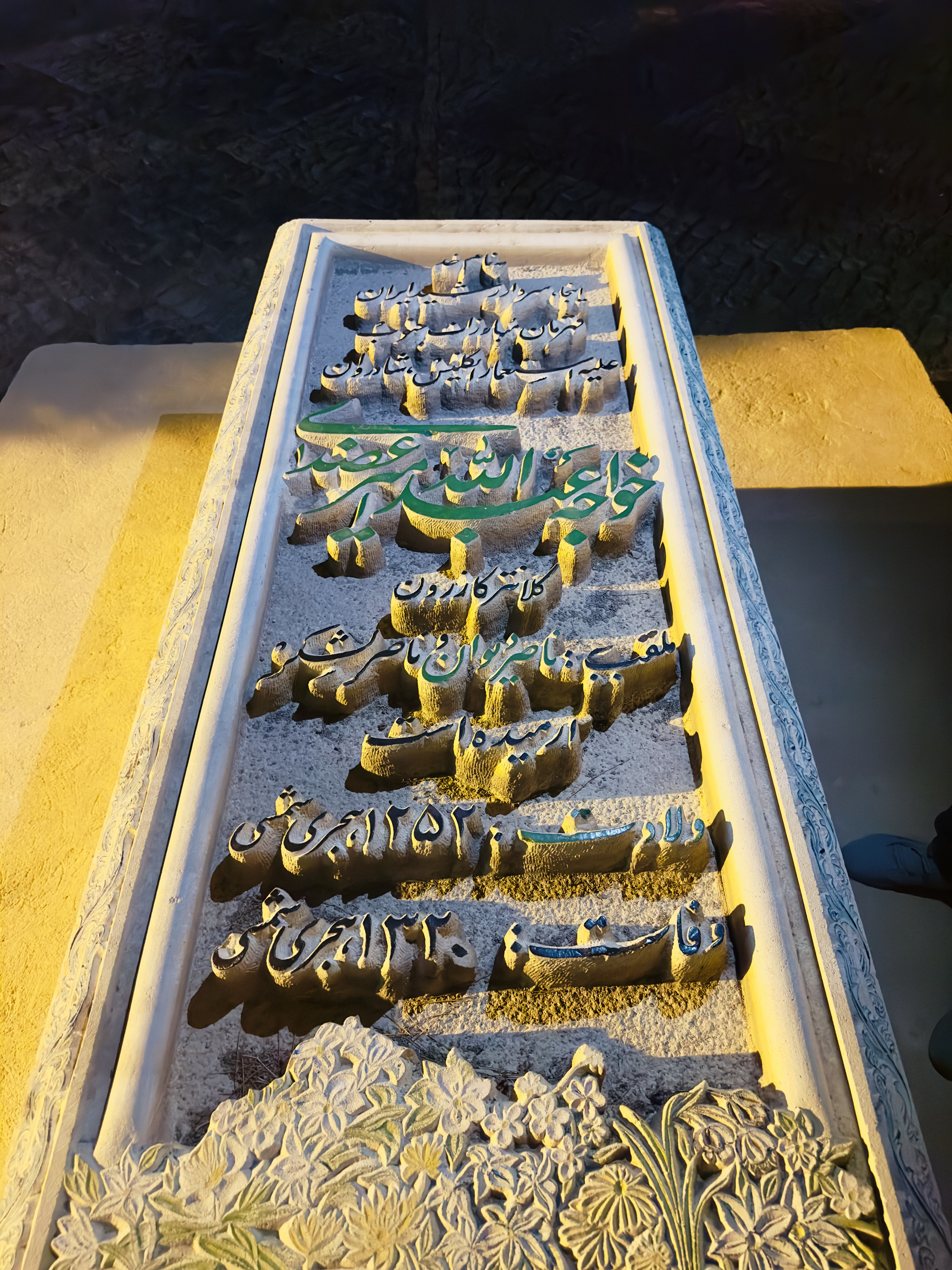
Tomb of Naser Divan Kazeruni

After returning to Kazerun, Naser Divan died on 29 April 1942 and was buried in the Shah Arqavan neighborhood of Kazerun, near the tomb of Golbon Kazeruni, a 19th century poet and mystic.

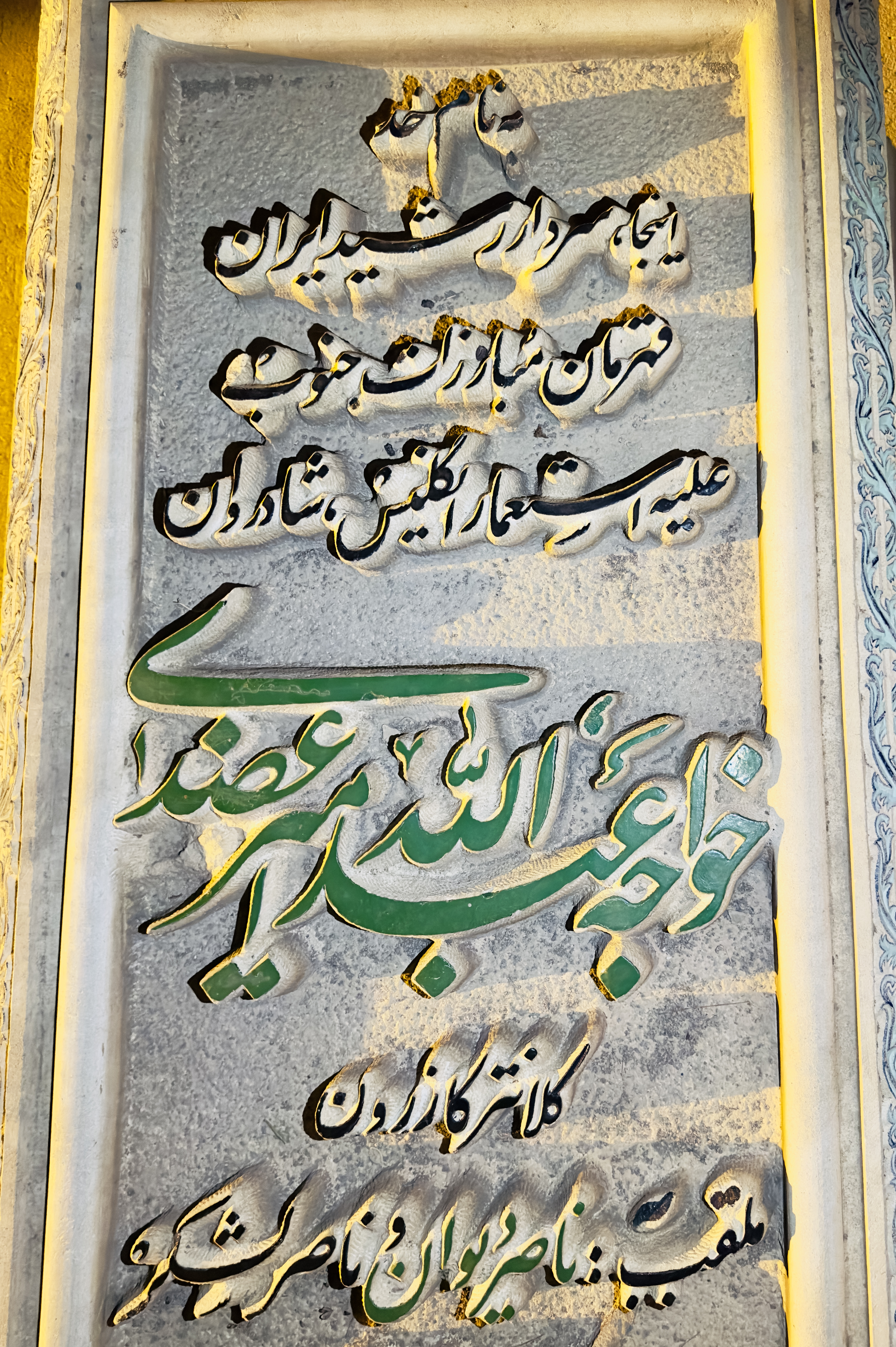

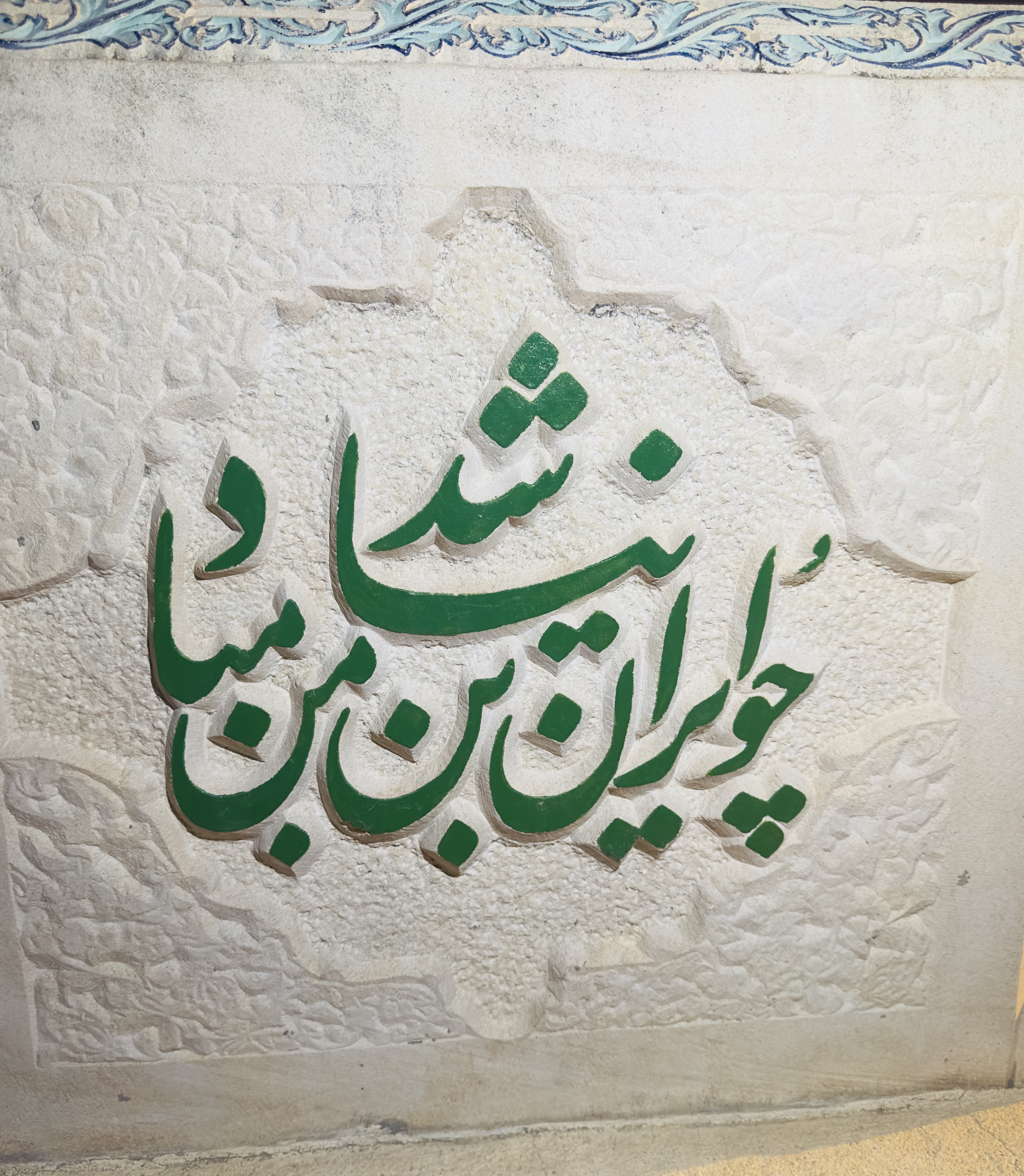

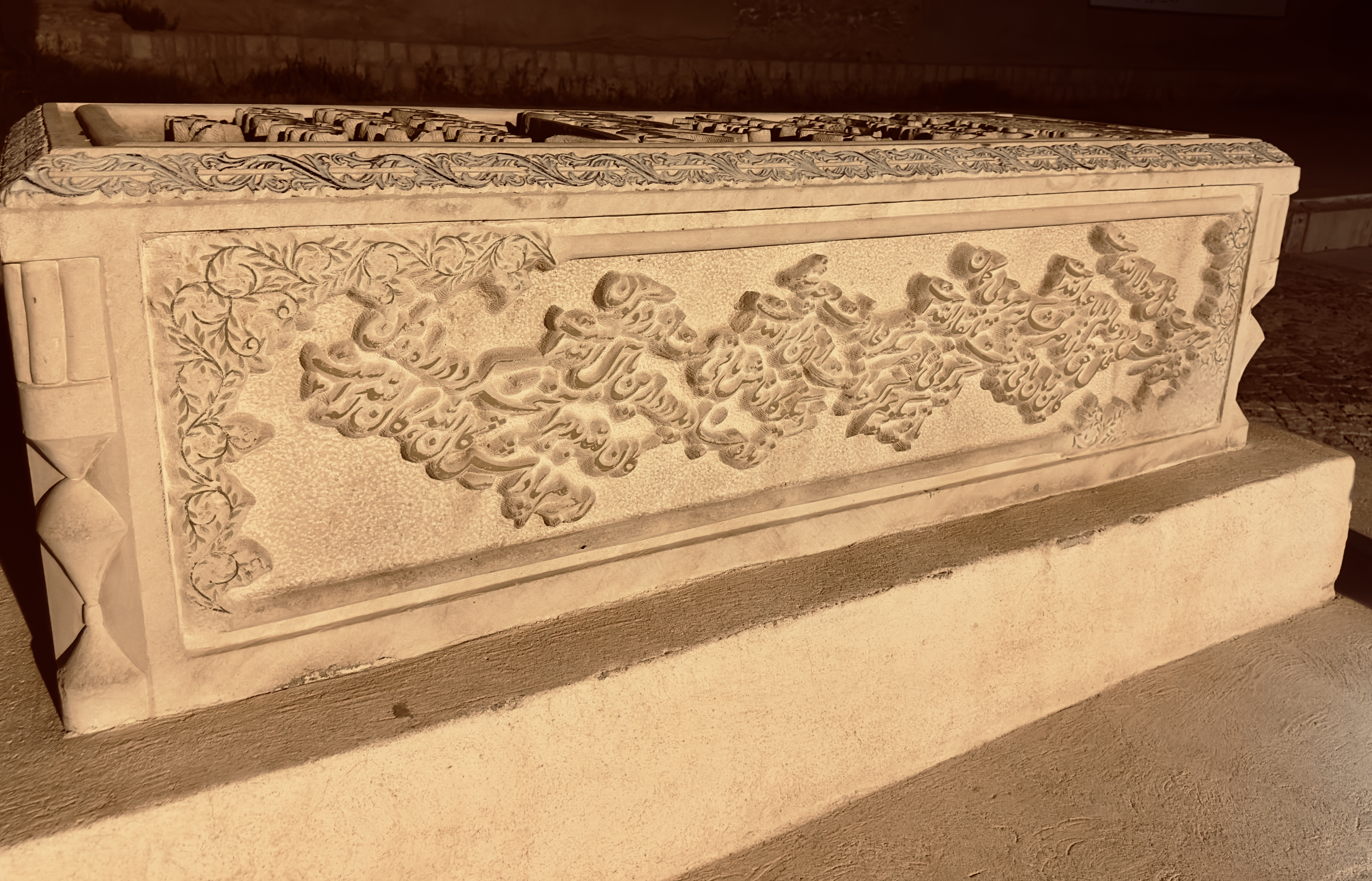

== Resources ==
- Naser Divan Kazeruni (Persian Wikipedia)
- Kazeroun Issues (c.1916-17)
- The political situation of Kazerun in the First World War
