= Sangtarashan cave =

Artificial cave in Jahrom, Iran

- غار سنگ‌تراشان
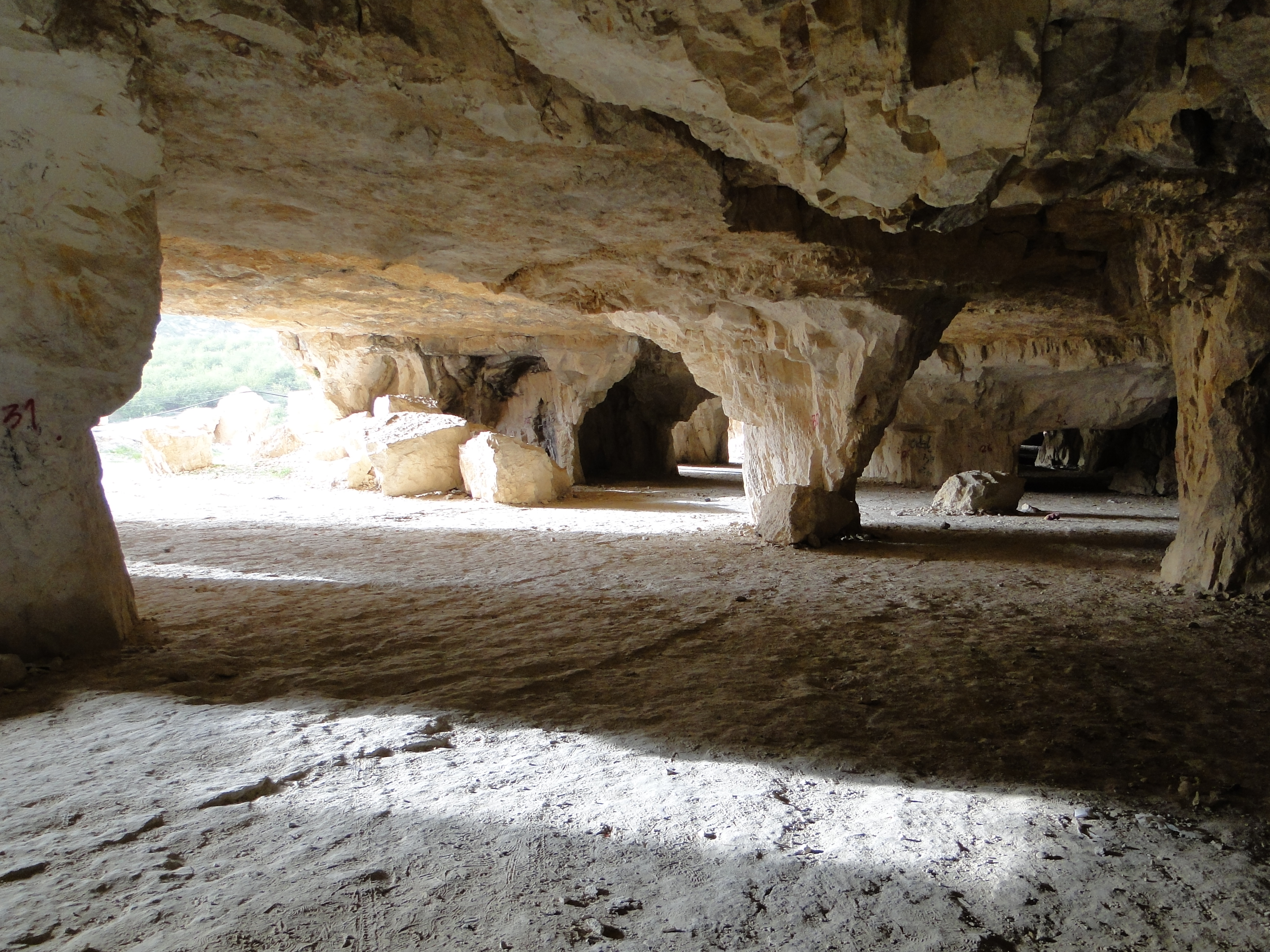
- Sangtarashan cave

- Location within Iran
- Location: Jahrom, Fars province, Iran
- Coordinates: 28.4854°N 53.5818°E
- Length: 350 meters
- Elevation: 1,091 meters
- Geology: Limestone and dolomite

Sangtarashan cave (Persian: غار سنگ‌تراشان, lit. 'The Cave of Stone-carvers'), also known as Sangshekanan cave and Sangeshkan cave, is a man-made cave located in Jahrom, southern Iran. With several corridors, columns and openings, Sangtarashan is the largest hand-made cave in the world.

The cave dates back 150 years and is regarded as the largest artificial cave in the world. The cave lies to the south of Jahrom. Although commonly referred to as a "cave," it is actually an artificial excavation, meaning it does not meet the geological criteria of a natural cave.
