= Ali Darzi =

20th and 21st-century Iranian linguist and translator

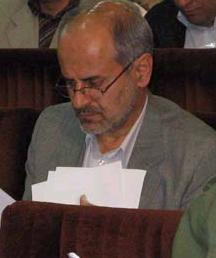
- Born: 1959 (age 66–67)

Academic background
- Education: University of Illinois at Urbana–Champaign (PhD); University of Tehran (MA)
- Thesis: Word order, NP movements, and opacity conditions in Persian (1996)
- Doctoral advisor: James Hye Suk Yoon

Academic work
- Main interests: Syntax, Persian grammar, Generative grammar

Ali Darzi (Persian: علی درزی; born 1959) is an Iranian linguist and professor of linguistics at the University of Tehran. He is known for his contributions to Persian syntax. Darzi received his MA from University of Tehran and earned his PhD from University of Illinois at Urbana–Champaign.

== Books ==
- Syntactic Argumentation, Tehran: SAMT, 2006
- The Syntactic and Phonetic Correlates of Topicalization and Raising Construction in Persian, with Vahid Sadeghi, Tehran: University of Tehran Press, 2012
