= Ali Torab Jahromi =

Persian poet (born 1883)

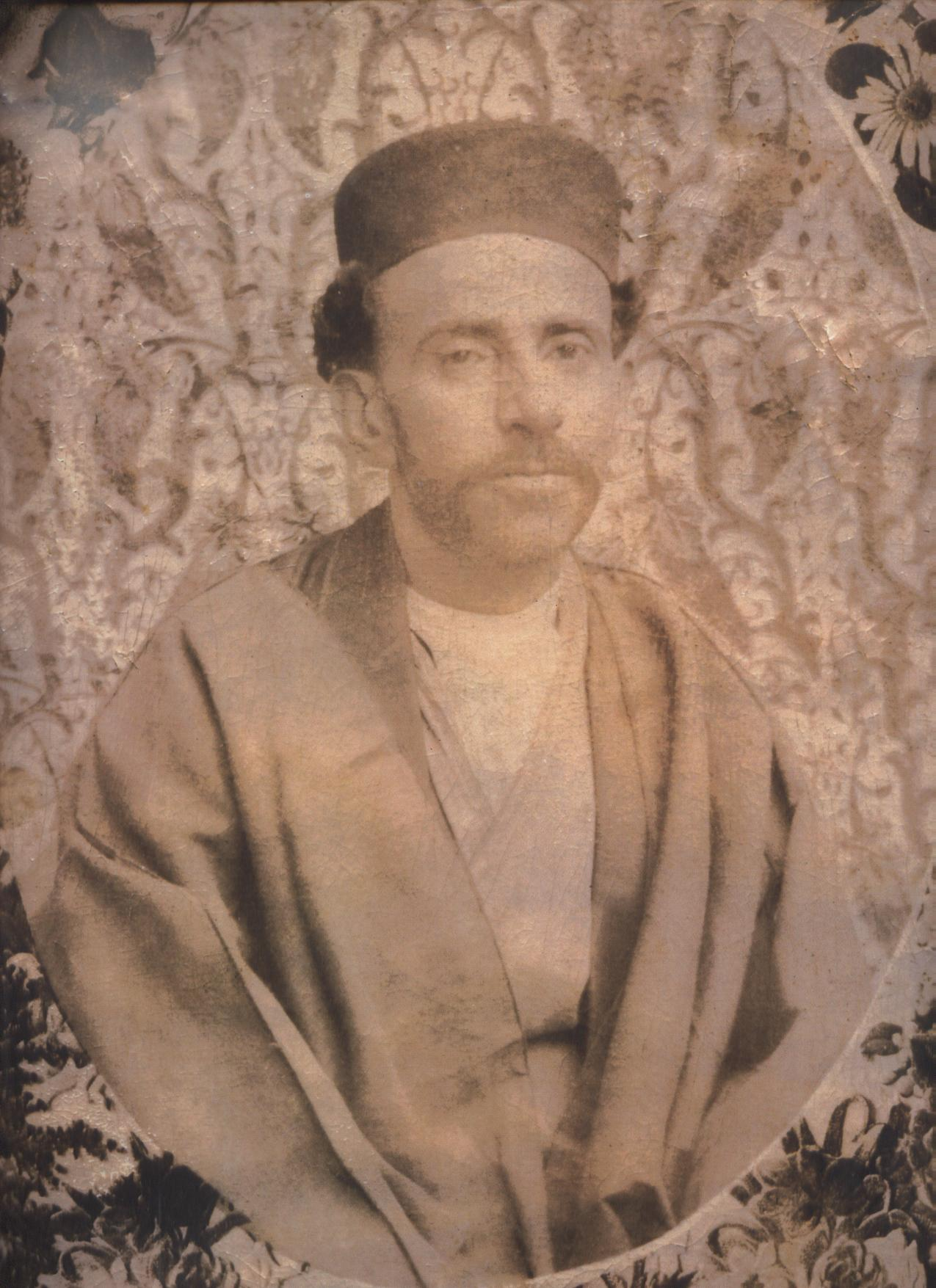
- Born: 1883; Jahrom, Iran
- Died: 1932 (aged 48–49); Shiraz, Iran
- Occupation: Poet
- Writing career
- Language: Persian

Ali Torab Jahromi (Persian: علی تراب جهرمی), known by his pen name Torab, was a Persian poet. He was born in 1883 in Jahrom and later moved to Shiraz for the rest of his life.

== Life ==
Torab was born in Jahrom and lived in the neighborhood of Kooy-e-Mosalla where he wrote around one thousand bayts of poems. Later, he moved to Shiraz and resided there for the rest of his life, where he died in 1932 at the age of 49.

== Work ==
There are stories about his meeting with Fath-Ali Shah Qajar, where Torab wrote some madihe (a form of praise in Persian literature) in front of the king and the king ordered to write these poems with gold. However, as the king and poet lived in different eras, these stories are not accurate and maybe referring to other kings of Qajar.

His most famous poem is sung by Mohammad Reza Shajarian, modified and blended with a poem of Hafez. The song was later used in the movie Love-stricken. Here is part of the poem:

دلبر که در طَرف چمن، خوابیده یکتا پیرهن
ترسم که بوی نسترن از خواب بیدارش کند

از نکهت گل دوختم، پیراهنی بهر تنش
از بس لطیف است آن بدن، ترسم که آزارش کند

ای ماهتاب آهسته رو، اندر حریم یار من
ترسم صدای پای تو از خواب بیدارش کند

My love lying across the meadow, with only a thin dress on her
I fear the scent of dog-rose may wake her up

Weaved a dress out of the flower scent for her
Her body is so soft I fear it may hurt her

Ah moonshine walk quietly in the realm of my love
I fear your footsteps may wake her up
