= Qalat, Jahrom =

Qalat قلات
- Village
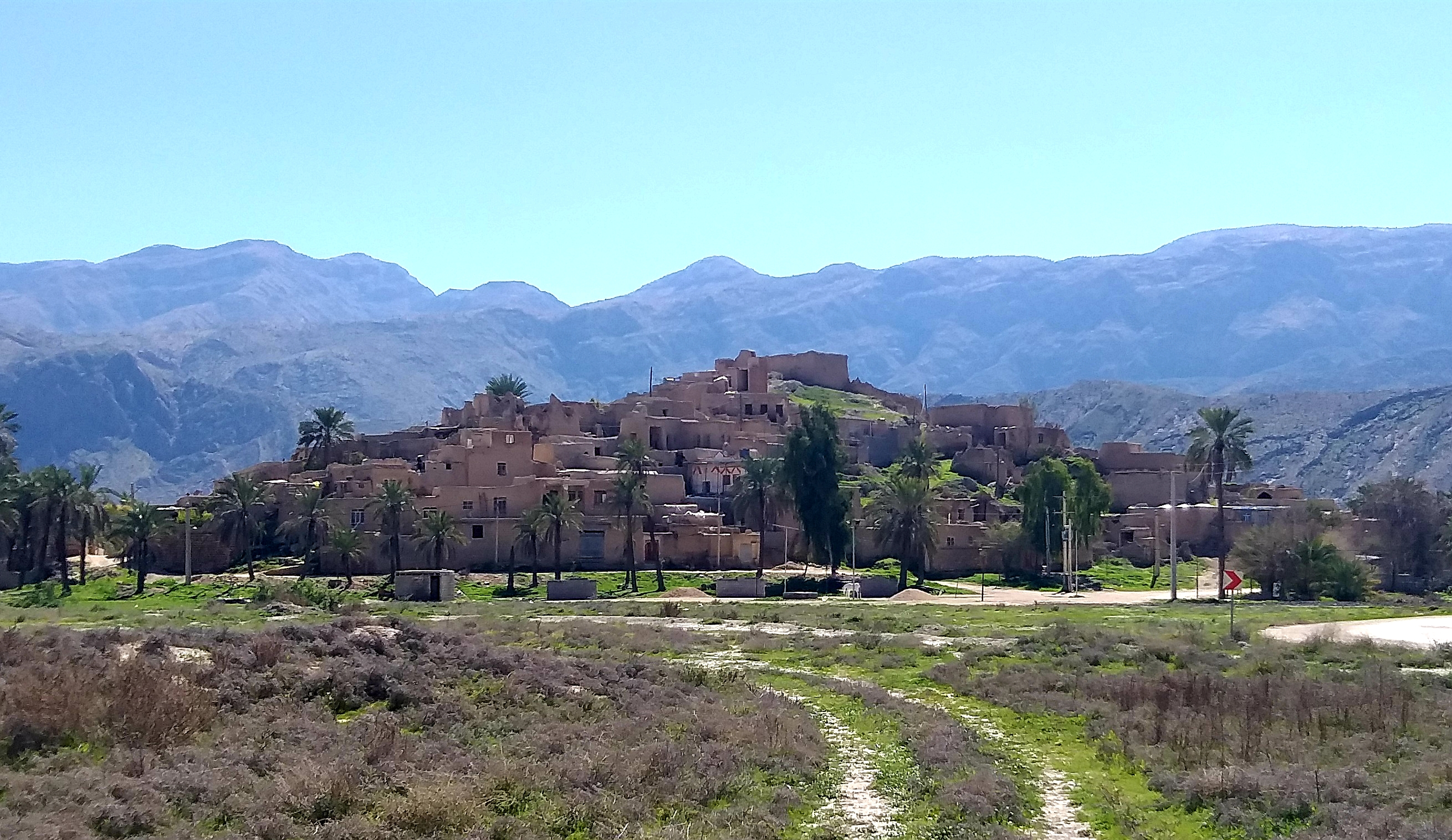

- Location within Iran
- Coordinates: 28°36′52″N 53°18′51″E
- Country: Iran
- Province: Fars
- County: Jahrom
- Bakhsh: Central
- Rural District: Jolgah

Population (2006)
  - Total: 263
- Time zone: UTC+3:30 (IRST)
  - Summer (DST): UTC+4:30 (IRDT)

Qalat (Persian: قلات, also Romanized as Qalāt and Qelāt) is a village in Jolgah Rural District, in the Central District of Jahrom County, Fars province, Iran. At the 2006 census, its population was 263, in 71 families.
