= SAMT (organization) =

The Organization for Researching and Composing University textbooks in the Humanities (Persian: سازمان مطالعه و تدوین کتب علوم انسانی دانشگاه‌ها) or SAMT* (Persian: سمت) is a public organization and publisher in Iran established by the "High Council for Cultural Revolution" after the Iranian Cultural Revolution in 1985. The organization publishes academic textbooks and sources on humanities in Iranian universities.

== See also ==
- Higher Education in Iran
- Iranian Cultural Revolution
