= Abd al-Husayn Najafi Lari =

Iranian clergyman and jurist

Abd al-Husayn Lari
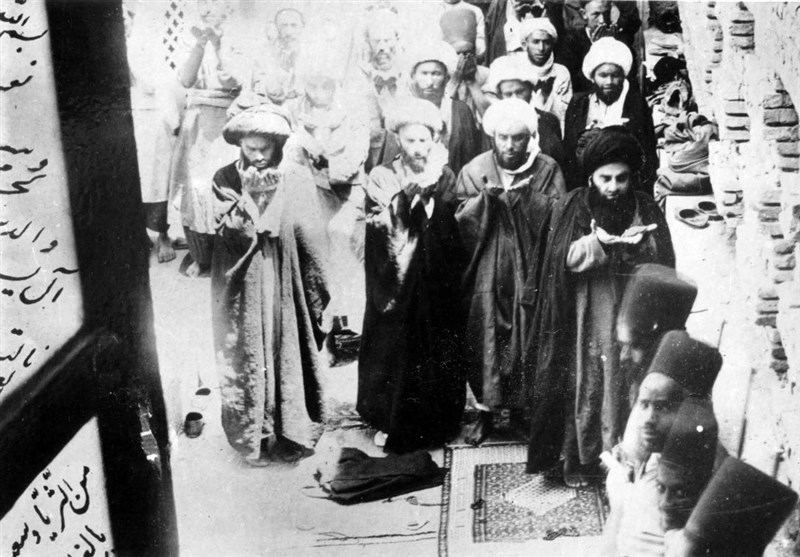
- Born: Dezful, Khuzestan province, Iran
- Died: 1342 AH; Jahrom, Fars, Iran

Ayatollah Seyed 'Abd al-Husayn Mousavi Dezfuli Najafi Lari (Persian: سید عبدالحسین موسوی لاری; 1226 in SH, Najaf – 1303 in SH, Jahrom), was a clergyman and jurist from southern Iran who advocated for the creation of a constitution and had a major role during the nomads' war against British forces in World War I.

== Living in Najaf ==
Seyed Abdol Hossein Moussavi Najafi Lari was originally from Dezful. He was born in 1847 in Najaf. He completed his studies under the supervision of great scholars such as Mirza Mohammed Hassan Husseini Shirazi, Sheikh Mohammad Hossein Kazemi, and Mullah Lotfollah Mazandarani. At the age of twenty-two he achieved the theological rank (Ijtihad). He lived in Najaf for 45 years and was also considered as a professor at Najaf's Seminary."

== Migration from Najaf to Lar ==
In the late Naser al-Din Shah Qajar era, intense conflicts and insecurity arising from its local rulers and politicians as well as tax abuses. Under the Elders Larestan County area of Mirza Mohammed Hassan Husseini Shirazi, requested they send a Mojtahed to take control of the Muslim community in Larestan County. Therefore, with a view Mirza Mohammed Hassan Husseini Shirazi, in 1309 AH Sayed Abdul Hussain, Najaf left and traveled to Larestan County."

== Important measures in Larestan ==
His association with the Fars and Bushehr revolutionary forces reflects his important and influential role in the Constitutional Revolution in Fars.

== Students ==
- Sheikh Abdul Hamid Mohajeri
- Sheikh Mohammad also known as Haji Molla Bashi
- Mullah Ghulam reza Jahromi
- Haji Mohammad Hashim Lari
- Mullah Karbalai Mohammad Juyomi
- Syed Abdul Hossein Mehri
- Sheikh Zakaria Ansari
- Syed Abdul al-baghi Shirazi
- Seyed Morteza Mojtahed Ahromi

== Death ==
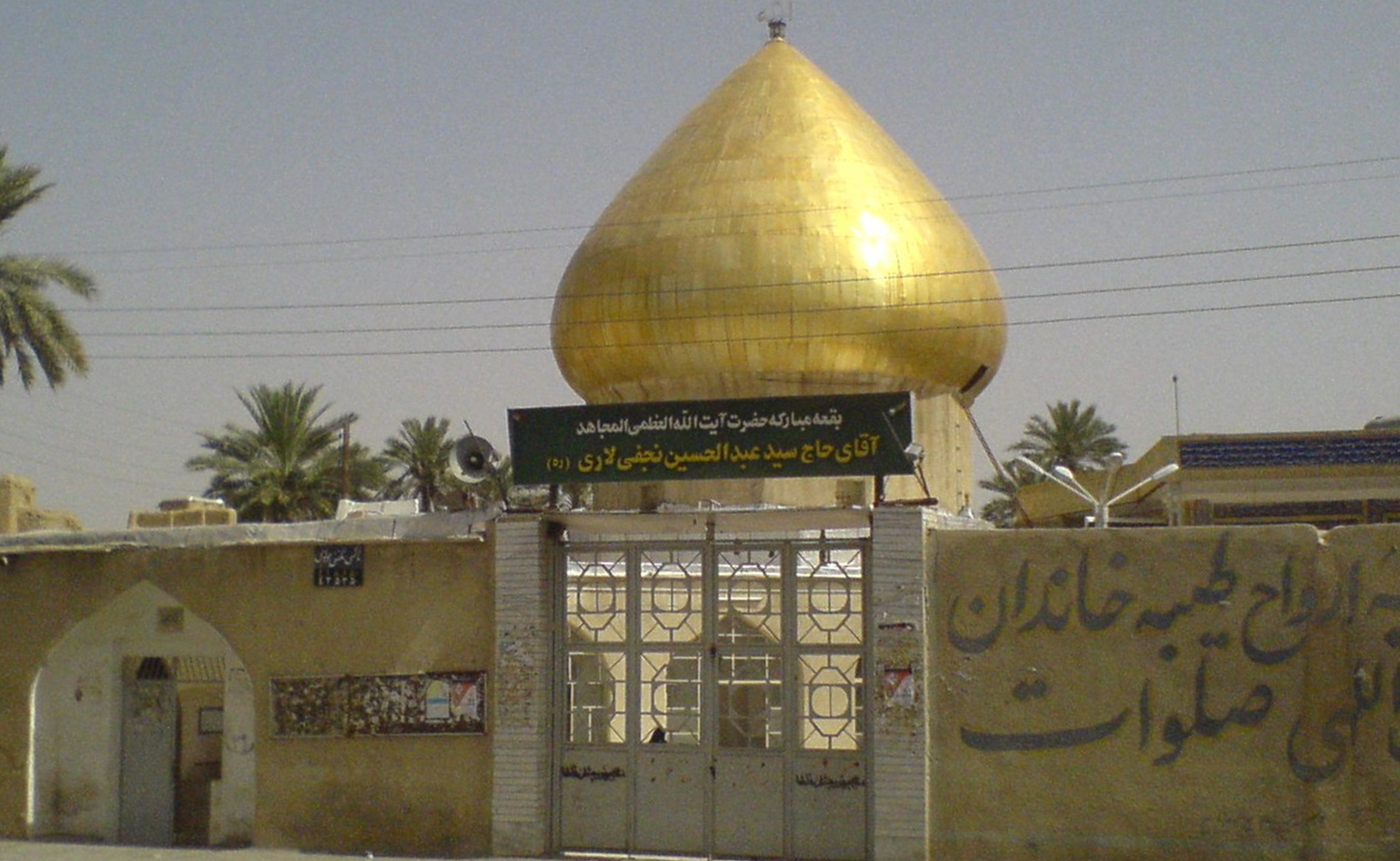
Shrine of Ayatollah Seyed Abdol Hossein Mousavi Najafi Lari in Jahrom

Seyed Abdol Hossein lari fourth Friday of Shawwal 1342 AH (19 Ordibehesht 1303 SH) died and was buried after six years of stay in the Jahrom.
