= Seh Chah =

Seh Chah or Sehchah (Persian: سه چاه) may refer to various places in Iran:

- Seh Chah, Bushehr
- Seh Chah, Eqlid, Fars Province
- Seh Chah, Jolgah, Jahrom County, Fars Province
- Seh Chah, Khafr, Jahrom County, Fars Province
- Seh Chah, Kuhak, Jahrom County, Fars Province
- Seh Chah, Faryab, Kerman Province
- Seh Chah, Rudbar-e Jonubi, Kerman Province
- Seh Chah, Kohgiluyeh and Boyer-Ahmad
