= Galu Boraq =

Galu Boraq گلوبراق
- Village
- Location within Iran
- Coordinates: 28°23′05″N 53°54′14″E
- Country: Iran
- Province: Fars
- County: Jahrom
- Bakhsh: Central
- Rural District: Kuhak

Population (2006)
  - Total: 162
- Time zone: UTC+3:30 (IRST)
  - Summer (DST): UTC+4:30 (IRDT)

Galu Boraq (Persian: گلوبراق, also Romanized as Galū Borāq) is a village in Kuhak Rural District, in the Central District of Jahrom County, Fars province, Iran. At the 2006 census, its population was 162, in 37 families.
