= Sistan-e Sofla =

Sistan-e Sofla سيستان سفلی
- Village
- Country: Iran
- Province: Fars
- County: Jahrom
- Bakhsh: Central
- Rural District: Jolgah

Population (2016)
  - Total: 52
- Time zone: UTC+3:30 (IRST)
  - Summer (DST): UTC+4:30 (IRDT)

Sistan-e Sofla (Persian: سيستان سفلی, also Romanized as Sīstān-e Soflā; also known as Sissun, Sīstān, Sīstān-e Pāyin, and Sīsūn) is a village in Jolgah Rural District, in the Central District of Jahrom County, Fars province, Iran. At the 2006 census, its population was 52, in 13 families.
