= Bas Kutuku =

Bas Kutuku بس كوتوكو
- Village
- Location within Iran
- Coordinates: 28°27′20″N 53°44′28″E
- Country: Iran
- Province: Fars
- County: Jahrom
- Bakhsh: Central
- Rural District: Kuhak

Population (2006)
  - Total: 20
- Time zone: UTC+3:30 (IRST)
  - Summer (DST): UTC+4:30 (IRDT)

Bas Kutuku (Persian: بس كوتوكو, also Romanized as Bas Kūtūkū; also known as Bast Kūtak) is a village in Kuhak Rural District, in the Central District of Jahrom County, Fars province, Iran. As of the 2006 census, its population was 20, in 5 families.
