= Ronjeku =

Ronjeku رنجكو
- Village
- Location within Iran
- Coordinates: 28°29′09″N 53°41′47″E
- Country: Iran
- Province: Fars
- County: Jahrom
- Bakhsh: Central
- Rural District: Kuhak

Population (2006)
  - Total: 161
- Time zone: UTC+3:30 (IRST)
  - Summer (DST): UTC+4:30 (IRDT)

Ronjeku (Persian: رنجكو, also Romanized as Ronjekū; also known as Ronjekū va Seh Darreh and Ronj Kūh) is a village in Kuhak Rural District, in the Central District of Jahrom County, Fars province, Iran. At the 2006 census, its population was 161, in 33 families.
