= Chah Tiz =

Chah Tiz چاه تيز
- Village
- Location within Iran
- Coordinates: 28°23′33″N 53°50′56″E
- Country: Iran
- Province: Fars
- County: Jahrom
- Bakhsh: Central
- Rural District: Kuhak

Population (2006)
  - Total: 24
- Time zone: UTC+3:30 (IRST)
  - Summer (DST): UTC+4:30 (IRDT)

Chah Tiz (Persian: چاه تيز, also Romanized as Chāh Tīz) is a village in Kuhak Rural District, in the Central District of Jahrom County, Fars province, Iran. At the 2006 census, its population was 24, in 6 families.
