= Mehdi Residential Housing =

Mehdi Residential Housing منازل مسکوني تيپ المهدي
- Village
- Country: Iran
- Province: Fars
- County: Jahrom
- Bakhsh: Central
- Rural District: Jolgah

Population (2006)
  - Total: 526
- Time zone: UTC+3:30 (IRST)
  - Summer (DST): UTC+4:30 (IRDT)

Mehdi Residential Housing (Persian: منازل مسکوني تيپ المهدي – Menāzl Meskūnī Tīp ol Mehdī) is a village in Jolgah Rural District, in the Central District of Jahrom County, Fars province, Iran. At the 2006 census, its population was 526, in 127 families.
