= Juyan, Iran =

Juyan جويان
- Village
- Location within Iran
- Coordinates: 28°34′06″N 53°30′10″E
- Country: Iran
- Province: Fars
- County: Jahrom
- Bakhsh: Central
- Rural District: Jolgah

Population (2006)
  - Total: 120
- Time zone: UTC+3:30 (IRST)
  - Summer (DST): UTC+4:30 (IRDT)

Juyan (Persian: جويان, also Romanized as Jūyān) is a village in Jolgah Rural District, in the Central District of Jahrom County, Fars province, Iran. At the 2006 census, its population was 120, in 26 families.
