= Bagh Avaz =

Bagh Avaz باغ عوض
- Village
- Location within Iran
- Coordinates: 28°34′56″N 53°28′25″E
- Country: Iran
- Province: Fars
- County: Jahrom
- Bakhsh: Central
- Rural District: Jolgah

Population (2006)
  - Total: 113
- Time zone: UTC+3:30 (IRST)
  - Summer (DST): UTC+4:30 (IRDT)

Bagh Avaz (Persian: باغ عوض, also Romanized as Bāgh 'Avaẕ) is a village in Jolgah Rural District, in the Central District of Jahrom County, Fars province, Iran. At the 2006 census, its population was 113, in 24 families.
