= Aliabad-e Nasir Khani =

Aliabad-e Nasir Khani علي ابادنصيرخاني
- Village
- Location within Iran
- Coordinates: 28°21′20″N 53°59′15″E
- Country: Iran
- Province: Fars
- County: Jahrom
- Bakhsh: Central
- Rural District: Kuhak

Population (2006)
  - Total: 91
- Time zone: UTC+3:30 (IRST)
  - Summer (DST): UTC+4:30 (IRDT)

Aliabad-e Nasir Khani (Persian: علي ابادنصيرخاني, also Romanized as 'Alīābād-e Naşīr Khānī; also known as Naşīr Khānī) is a village in Kuhak Rural District, in the Central District of Jahrom County, Fars province, Iran. At the 2006 census, its population was 91, in 20 families.
