= Shir Habib =

Shir Habib شيرحبيب
- Village
- Location within Iran
- Coordinates: 28°31′54″N 53°17′16″E
- Country: Iran
- Province: Fars
- County: Jahrom
- Bakhsh: Central
- Rural District: Jolgah

Population (2006)
  - Total: 18
- Time zone: UTC+3:30 (IRST)
  - Summer (DST): UTC+4:30 (IRDT)

Shir Habib (Persian: شيرحبيب, also Romanized as Shīr Ḩabīb; also known as Sar Ḩabīb) is a village in Jolgah Rural District, in the Central District of Jahrom County, Fars province, Iran. At the 2006 census, its population was 18, in 4 families.
