= Mirchaki =

Mirchaki ميرچاكي
- Village
- Location within Iran
- Coordinates: 28°35′55″N 53°22′58″E
- Country: Iran
- Province: Fars
- County: Jahrom
- Bakhsh: Central
- Rural District: Jolgah

Population (2006)
  - Total: 19
- Time zone: UTC+3:30 (IRST)
  - Summer (DST): UTC+4:30 (IRDT)

Mirchaki (Persian: ميرچاكي, also Romanized as Mīrchākī; also known as Mīrchekī) is a village in Jolgah Rural District, in the Central District of Jahrom County, Fars province, Iran. At the 2006 census, its population was 19, in 4 families.
