= Gach Boru-e Bala =

Gach Boru-e Bala گچ بروبالا
- Village
- Location within Iran
- Coordinates: 28°27′18″N 53°52′47″E
- Country: Iran
- Province: Fars
- County: Jahrom
- Bakhsh: Central
- Rural District: Kuhak

Population (2006)
  - Total: 126
- Time zone: UTC+3:30 (IRST)
  - Summer (DST): UTC+4:30 (IRDT)

Gach Boru-e Bala (Persian: گچ بروبالا, also Romanized as Gach Borū-e Bālā; also known as Gach Borū and Gach Bowrū) is a village in Kuhak Rural District, in the Central District of Jahrom County, Fars province, Iran. At the 2006 census, its population was 126, in 22 families.
