= Tang Behdaneh =

Tang Behdaneh تنگ به‌دانه
- Village
- Country: Iran
- Province: Fars
- County: Jahrom
- Bakhsh: Central
- Rural District: Jolgah

Population (2016)
  - Total: 20
- Time zone: UTC+3:30 (IRST)
  - Summer (DST): UTC+4:30 (IRDT)

Tang Behdaneh (Persian: تنگ به‌دانه) is a village in Jolgah Rural District, in the Central District of Jahrom County, Fars province, Iran. At the 2016 census, its population was 20, in 4 families.
