= Jamghan =

Jamghan جامغان
- Village
- Location within Iran
- Coordinates: 28°33′00″N 53°34′16″E
- Country: Iran
- Province: Fars
- County: Jahrom
- Bakhsh: Central
- Rural District: Jolgah

Population (2016)
  - Total: 67
- Time zone: UTC+3:30 (IRST)
  - Summer (DST): UTC+4:30 (IRDT)

Jamghan (Persian: جامغان, also Romanized as Jāmghān and Jā Moghān; also known as Chāmqān, Jamoqān, and Jāmqān) is a village in Jolgah Rural District, in the Central District of Jahrom County, Fars province, Iran. At the 2016 census, its population was 67.
