= Damparuri-ye Khezrehl Run =

Damparuri-ye Khezrehl Run دامپروري خزرهلرون
- Village
- Country: Iran
- Province: Fars
- County: Jahrom
- Bakhsh: Central
- Rural District: Jolgah

Population (2006)
  - Total: 43
- Time zone: UTC+3:30 (IRST)
  - Summer (DST): UTC+4:30 (IRDT)

Damparuri-ye Khezrehl Run (Persian: دامپروري خزرهلرون, also Romanized as Dāmparūrī-ye Khezrehl Rūn) is a village in Jolgah Rural District, in the Central District of Jahrom County, Fars province, Iran. At the 2006 census, its population was 43, in 9 families.
