= Mohammadabad-e kouhpayeh =

Mohammadabad-e kouhpayeh محمدآباد کوهپایه
- Village
- Location within Iran
- Coordinates: 28°30′26.44″N 53°39′3.29″E
- Country: Iran
- Province: Fars
- County: Jahrom
- Bakhsh: Central
- Rural District: Jolgah

Population (2016)
  - Total: 63
- Time zone: UTC+3:30 (IRST)
  - Summer (DST): UTC+4:30 (IRDT)

Mohammadabad-e kouhpayeh (Persian: محمدآباد کوهپایه) is a village in Jolgah Rural District, in the Central District of Jahrom County, Fars province, Iran. At the 2016 census, its population was 63, in 17 families.
