= Par Ahu =

Par Ahu پراهو
- Village
- Location within Iran
- Coordinates: 28°37′12″N 53°22′20″E
- Country: Iran
- Province: Fars
- County: Jahrom
- Bakhsh: Central
- Rural District: Jolgah

Population (2006)
  - Total: 27
- Time zone: UTC+3:30 (IRST)
  - Summer (DST): UTC+4:30 (IRDT)

Par Ahu (Persian: پراهو, also Romanized as Par Āhū) is a village in Jolgah Rural District, in the Central District of Jahrom County, Fars province, Iran. At the 2006 census, its population was 27, in 4 families.
