= Tall-e Gachi =

Tall-e Gachi تل گچي
- Village
- Location within Iran
- Coordinates: 28°22′43″N 53°54′23″E
- Country: Iran
- Province: Fars
- County: Jahrom
- Bakhsh: Central
- Rural District: Kuhak

Population (2006)
  - Total: 24
- Time zone: UTC+3:30 (IRST)
  - Summer (DST): UTC+4:30 (IRDT)

Tall-e Gachi (Persian: تل گچي, also Romanized as Tall-e Gachī; also known as Tall-e Khoshkī) is a village in Kuhak Rural District, in the Central District of Jahrom County, Fars province, Iran. At the 2006 census, its population was 24, in 4 families.
