= Pazanuyeh =

Pazanuyeh پازنويه
- Village
- Location within Iran
- Coordinates: 28°22′46″N 53°41′04″E
- Country: Iran
- Province: Fars
- County: Jahrom
- Bakhsh: Central
- Rural District: Jolgah

Population (2006)
  - Total: 203
- Time zone: UTC+3:30 (IRST)
  - Summer (DST): UTC+4:30 (IRDT)

Pazanuyeh (Persian: پازنويه, also Romanized as Pāzanūyeh; also known as Pāznū) is a village in Jolgah Rural District, in the Central District of Jahrom County, Fars province, Iran. At the 2006 census, its population was 203, in 38 families.
