= Shir Daneh =

Shir Daneh شيردانه
- Village
- Country: Iran
- Province: Fars
- County: Jahrom
- Bakhsh: Central
- Rural District: Jolgah

Population (2006)
  - Total: 48
- Time zone: UTC+3:30 (IRST)
  - Summer (DST): UTC+4:30 (IRDT)

Shir Daneh (Persian: شيردانه, also Romanized as Shīr Dāneh) is a village in Jolgah Rural District, in the Central District of Jahrom County, Fars province, Iran. At the 2006 census, its population was 48, in 11 families.
