= Ashkam Shur =

Ashkam Shur اشكم شور
- Village
- Country: Iran
- Province: Fars
- County: Jahrom
- Bakhsh: Central
- Rural District: Kuhak

Population (2006)
  - Total: 25
- Time zone: UTC+3:30 (IRST)
  - Summer (DST): UTC+4:30 (IRDT)

Ashkam Shur (Persian: اشكم شور, also Romanized as Āshkam Shūr) is a village in Kuhak Rural District, in the Central District of Jahrom County, Fars province, Iran. At the 2006 census, its population was 25, in 4 families.
