= Sadeqabad, Jahrom =

Village in Fars province, Iran

Sadeqabad Persian: صادق اباد
- Village
- Location within Iran
- Coordinates: 28°32′34″N 53°36′35″E
- Country: Iran
- Province: Fars
- County: Jahrom
- District: Central
- Rural District: Jolgah

Population (2016)
  - Total: 859
- Time zone: UTC+3:30 (IRST)

Sadeqabad (Persian: صادق اباد) (Note: Also romanized as Şādeqābād) is a village in Jolgah Rural District of the Central District of Jahrom County, Fars province, Iran.

== Demographics ==
=== Population ===
At the time of the 2006 National Census, the village's population was 764 in 178 households. The following census in 2011 counted 843 people in 222 households. The 2016 census measured the population of the village as 859 people in 242 households. It was the most populous village in its rural district.
