= Hasan Khani, Fars =

Village in Fars

Hasan Khani حسن خاني
- Village
- Location within Iran
- Coordinates: 28°19′51″N 53°35′11″E
- Country: Iran
- Province: Fars
- County: Jahrom
- Bakhsh: Central
- Rural District: Jolgah

Population (2006)
  - Total: 92
- Time zone: UTC+3:30 (IRST)
  - Summer (DST): UTC+4:30 (IRDT)

Hasan Khani (Persian: حسن خاني, also Romanized as Ḩasan Khānī) is a village in Jolgah Rural District, in the Central District of Jahrom County, Fars province, Iran. At the 2006 census, its population was 92, in 22 families.
