= Khorramabad, Jahrom =

Village in Fars province, Iran

Khorramabad Persian: خرم اباد
- Village
- Location within Iran
- Coordinates: 28°28′22″N 53°44′01″E
- Country: Iran
- Province: Fars
- County: Jahrom
- District: Central
- Rural District: Kuhak

Population (2016)
  - Total: 31
- Time zone: UTC+3:30 (IRST)

Khorramabad (Persian: خرم اباد) (Note: Also romanized as Khorramābād; also known as Khurramābād) is a village in, and the capital of, Kuhak Rural District of the Central District of Jahrom County, Fars province, Iran.

== Demographics ==
=== Population ===
At the time of the 2006 National Census, the village's population was 137 in 35 households. The following census in 2011 counted 59 people in 14 households. The 2016 census measured the population of the village as 31 people in 12 households.
