= Hasan Khani =

Hasan Khani (Persian: حسن خاني) may refer to:

- Hasan Khani, Fars
- Hasan Khani, Qazvin
