= Tall Heydari =

Tall Heydari or Tol-e Heydari (Persian: تل حيدري) may refer to:

- Tall Heydari, Jahrom
- Tol-e Heydari, Mamasani
