= Tall Heydari, Jahrom =

Tall Heydari تل حيدري
- Village
- Country: Iran
- Province: Fars
- County: Jahrom
- Bakhsh: Central
- Rural District: Jolgah

Population (2006)
  - Total: 11
- Time zone: UTC+3:30 (IRST)
  - Summer (DST): UTC+4:30 (IRDT)

Tall Heydari (Persian: تل حيدري, also Romanized as Tall Ḩeydarī) is a village in Jolgah Rural District, in the Central District of Jahrom County, Fars province, Iran. At the 2006 census, its population was 11, in 5 families.
