= Seh Chah, Jolgah =

Seh Chah سه چاه
- Village
- Location within Iran
- Coordinates: 28°28′50″N 53°28′56″E
- Country: Iran
- Province: Fars
- County: Jahrom
- Bakhsh: Central
- Rural District: Jolgah

Population (2006)
  - Total: 39
- Time zone: UTC+3:30 (IRST)
  - Summer (DST): UTC+4:30 (IRDT)

Seh Chah (Persian: سه چاه, also Romanized as Seh Chāh and Sehchāh) is a village in Jolgah Rural District, in the Central District of Jahrom County, Fars province, Iran. At the 2006 census, its population was 39, in 8 families.
