= Heydarabad, Jahrom =

Neighborhood in Fars province, Iran

Heydarabad Persian: حيدراباد
- Neighborhood
- Location within Iran
- Coordinates: 28°33′01″N 53°35′35″E
- Country: Iran
- Province: Fars
- County: Jahrom
- District: Central
- City: Jahrom

Population (2011)
  - Total: 8,242
- Time zone: UTC+3:30 (IRST)

Heydarabad (Persian: حيدراباد) (Note: Also romanized as Haidarābād and Ḩeydarābād) is a neighborhood in the city of Jahrom in the Central District of Jahrom County, Fars province, Iran. It was the capital of Jolgah Rural District until its administrative center was transferred to Jahrom.

== Demographics ==
=== Population ===
At the time of the 2006 National Census, Heydarabad's population was 6,726 in 1,449 households, when it was a village in Jolgah Rural District. The following census in 2011 counted 8,242 people in 2,115 households. After the census, Heydarabad was absorbed by the city of Jahrom.
