= Sistan-e Olya =

Sistan-e Olya سيستان عليا
- Village
- Location within Iran
- Coordinates: 28°31′00″N 53°16′38″E
- Country: Iran
- Province: Fars
- County: Jahrom
- Bakhsh: Central
- Rural District: Jolgah

Population (2006)
  - Total: 10
- Time zone: UTC+3:30 (IRST)
  - Summer (DST): UTC+4:30 (IRDT)

Sistan-e Olya (Persian: سيستان عليا, also Romanized as Sīstān-e 'Olyā; also known as Sissun, Sīstān, Sīstān-e Bālā va Shīr Ḩabīb, and Sīsūn) is a village in Jolgah Rural District, in the Central District of Jahrom County, Fars province, Iran. At the 2006 census, its population was 10, in 4 families.
