= Jadir =

Jadir جدير
- Village
- Location within Iran
- Coordinates: 28°33′33″N 53°33′19″E
- Country: Iran
- Province: Fars
- County: Jahrom
- Bakhsh: Central
- Rural District: Jolgah

Population (2006)
  - Total: 319
- Time zone: UTC+3:30 (IRST)
  - Summer (DST): UTC+4:30 (IRDT)

Jadir (Persian: جدير, also Romanized as Jadīr; also known as Jadīd) is a village in Jolgah Rural District, in the Central District of Jahrom County, Fars province, Iran. At the 2006 census, its population was 319, in 71 families.
