= Seh Chah, Kuhak =

Village in Fars province, Iran

Seh Chah Persian: سه چاه
- Village
- Location within Iran
- Coordinates: 28°24′35″N 53°49′42″E
- Country: Iran
- Province: Fars
- County: Jahrom
- District: Central
- Rural District: Kuhak

Population (2016)
  - Total: 256
- Time zone: UTC+3:30 (IRST)

Seh Chah (Persian: سه چاه) (Note: Also romanized as Seh Chāh; also known as Seh Chāh-e Bālā) is a village in Kuhak Rural District of the Central District of Jahrom County, Fars province, Iran.

== Demographics ==
=== Population ===
At the time of the 2006 National Census, the village's population was 210 in 39 households. The following census in 2011 counted 229 people in 49 households. The 2016 census measured the population of the village as 256 people in 63 households. It was the most populous village in its rural district.
