= Jadid, Iran =

Jadid (Persian: جديد) may refer to:

- Jadid, Fars
- Jadid, Khuzestan

== See also ==
- Jadid, meaning "New", is a common element in Iranian place names; see.
