= Sistan (disambiguation) =

Sistan (Persian: سیستان) may refer to:

- Sistan, a historical region
- Sistan and Baluchestan province
- Sistan-e Olya, a village in Fars province, Iran
- Sistan Rural District, Isfahan province, Iran
- Sustan, a village in Gilan province, Iran
