= Tabar Castle =

Castle in Fars Province, Iran

- قلعه تبر

General information
- Type: Castle
- Location: Jahrom County, Iran

Tabar Castle (Persian: قلعه تبر) is a historical castle located in Jahrom County in Fars Province, Iran. It dates back to the Umayyad dynasty.
