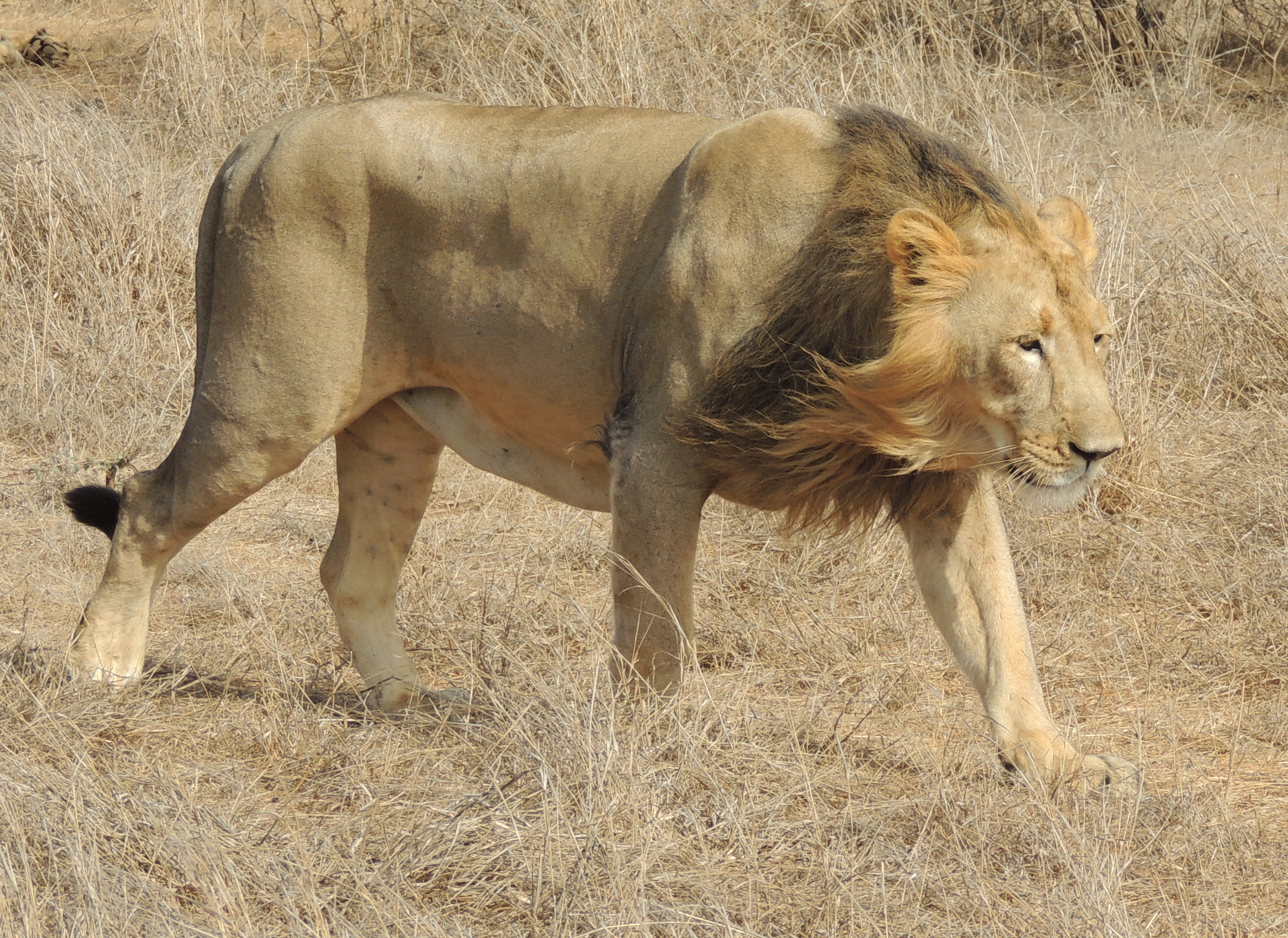
- Male Asiatic lion
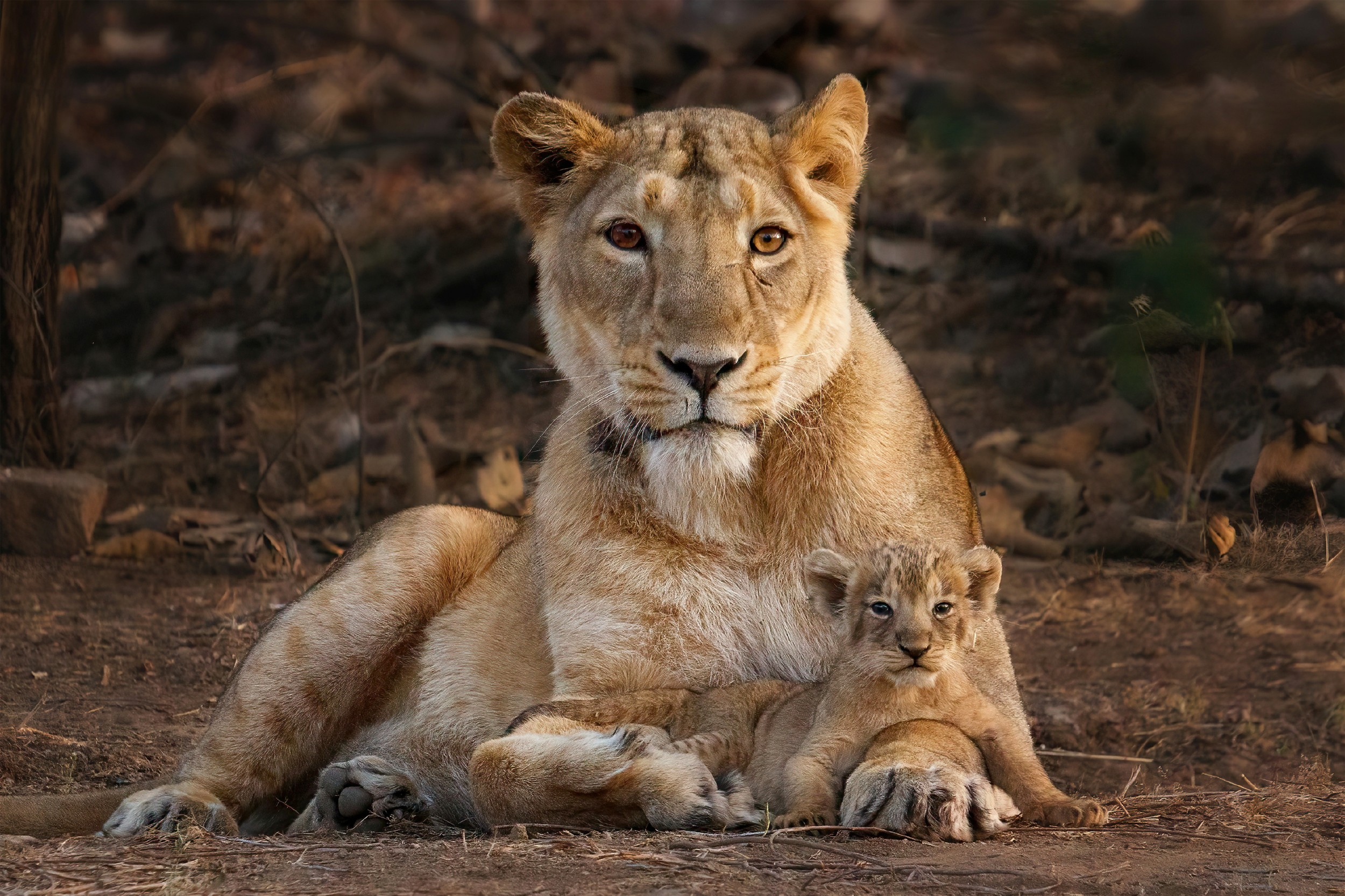
- Female Asiatic lion with cub

Conservation status
- Endangered (IUCN 3.1)

Scientific classification
- Kingdom: Animalia
- Phylum: Chordata
- Class: Mammalia
- Order: Carnivora
- Family: Felidae
- Genus: Panthera
- Species: P. leo
- Subspecies: P. l. leo
- Population: Asiatic lion
- Distribution of Asiatic lion in 2015

= Asiatic lion =

Lion population in India

The Asiatic lion is a lion that belongs to the subspecies Panthera leo leo. The surviving population of these lions is restricted to the Indian state of Gujarat. It is classified as endangered in the IUCN Red List, is included on CITES Appendix I, and is legally protected in India.

Phylogeographic analysis reveal that the Asiatic lion is genetically closely related to the North and West African lions. The adult males measure up to 120 cm (47 in) in shoulder height and weigh about 160 kg (350 lb), making them slightly smaller than large African lions but similar to Central African populations. The Asiatic lion has a ruddy-tawny to sandy grey fur, a distinctive longitudinal skin fold along its belly, and a larger tail tuft. The males are distinguishable from the females by the presence of manes, though they are shorter and sparser than the African counterparts. It also differs from the African lion in skull structure, having a stronger sagittal crest, shorter post-orbital area, and often divided infraorbital foramina.

The first scientific description of the Asiatic lion published in 1826 was based on a specimen from Persia. Until the 19th century, it ranged from Saudi Arabia, eastern Turkey, Iran, Mesopotamia and southern Pakistan to Central India. Since the turn of the 20th century, its range has been restricted to the Gir National Park and its surrounding areas in Western India. The Indian population, which numbered only 411 individuals in 2010, has steadily increased since then. In 2015, the lion population was estimated at 523 individuals, which increased to 650 in 2017 and 674 by 2023. As of 2025, there were an estimated 891 lions in the wild. Since the mid-1990s, due to increase in the Asiatic lion population, about a third resided outside the protected area, and the conflict between local residents and the lions have increased.

Male Asiatic lions are often solitary or form small coalitions of up to three, while females live in larger prides with the cubs. Males and females usually only associate briefly during mating. In the Gir National Park, they are mainly nocturnal and defend territories, whose size varies. They prefer dense vegetation or shaded riverine habitats in dry periods. They prefer large prey and commonly hunt chital, sambar, nilgai, and other livestock, and may also scavenge or prey on species such as wild boar and mugger crocodiles near water sources.

== Taxonomy ==
Felis leo persicus was the scientific name proposed by Johann N. Meyer in 1826 who described an Asiatic lion skin from Persia. In the 19th century, several zoologists described lion zoological specimen from other parts of Asia that used to be considered synonyms of P. l. persica:

- Felis leo bengalensis proposed by Edward Turner Bennett in 1829 was a lion kept in the menagerie of the Tower of London. Bennett's essay contains a drawing titled 'Bengal lion'.
- Felis leo goojratensis proposed by Walter Smee in 1833 was based on two skins of maneless lions from Gujarat that Smee exhibited in a meeting of the Zoological Society of London.
- Leo asiaticus proposed by Sir William Jardine, 7th Baronet in 1834 was a lion from India.
- Felis leo indicus proposed by Henri Marie Ducrotay de Blainville in 1843 was based on an Asiatic lion skull.

In 2017, the Asiatic lion was subsumed to P. l. leo due to close morphological and molecular genetic similarities with Barbary lion specimens. However, several scientists continue using P. l. persica for the Asiatic lion. A standardised haplogroup phylogeny supports that the Asiatic lion is not a distinct subspecies, and that it represents a haplogroup of the northern P. l. leo.

== Evolution ==
Lions first dispersed out of Africa at least 1 million years ago, giving rise to the Eurasian Panthera fossilis which later evolved into Panthera spelaea (both having the common name "cave lions"), which became extinct around 14,000 years ago. Genetic analysis of P. spelaea indicates that it represented a distinct species that genetically diverged from the modern lion around 500,000 – 1 million years ago. Some limited interbreeding between modern lions and cave lions is suggested to have occurred, as some Late Pleistocene cave lions show a small amount (up to 3.2%–4.4%) of ancestry from modern lions, with this modern lion ancestry appearing to have closest affinities with the recently extinct Asiatic lion population that formerly inhabited West Asia.

Pleistocene fossils assigned as belonging or probably belonging to the modern lion have been reported from several sites in the Middle East, such as Shishan Marsh in the Azraq Basin, Jordan, dating to around 250,000 years ago, and Wezmeh Cave in the Zagros Mountains of western Iran, dating to around 70–10,000 years ago, with other reports from Pleistocene deposits in Nadaouiyeh Ain Askar and Douara Cave, Syria. In 1976, fossil lion remains were reported from Pleistocene deposits in West Bengal. A fossil carnassial excavated from Batadomba Cave indicates that lions inhabited Sri Lanka during the Late Pleistocene. This population may have become extinct around 39,000 years ago, before the arrival of humans in Sri Lanka.

=== Phylogeography ===
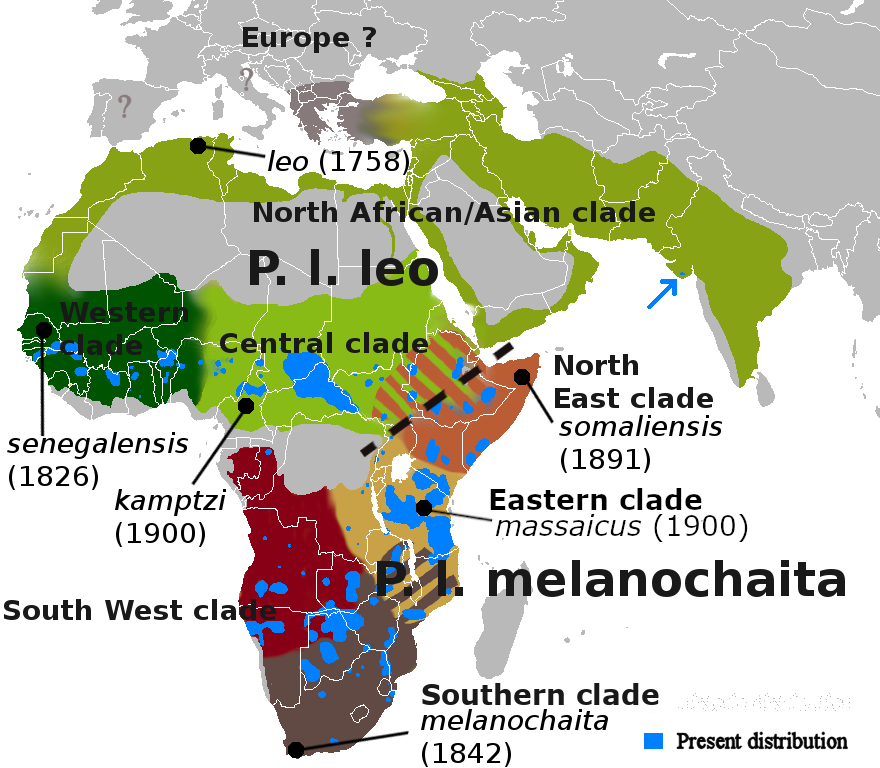
Range map including proposed clades and the two subspecies–P. l. leo (Asiatic lion) and P. l. melanochaita (Cape lion)

Results of a phylogeographic analysis based on mtDNA sequences of lions from across the global range, including now extinct populations like Barbary lions, indicates that sub-Saharan African lions are phylogenetically basal to all modern lions. These findings support an African origin of modern lion evolution with a probable centre in East and Southern Africa. It is likely that lions migrated from there to West Africa, eastern North Africa and via the periphery of the Arabian Peninsula into Turkey, southern Europe and northern India during the last 20,000 years. The Sahara, Congolian rainforests and the Great Rift Valley are natural barriers to lion dispersal.

Genetic markers of 357 samples from captive and wild lions from Africa and India were examined. Results indicate four lineages of lion populations: one in Central and North Africa to Asia, one in Kenya, one in Southern Africa, and one in Southern and East Africa; the first wave of lion expansion probably occurred about 118,000 years ago from East Africa into West Asia, and the second wave in the late Pleistocene or early Holocene periods from Southern Africa towards East Africa. The Asiatic lion is genetically closer to North and West African lions than to the group comprising East and Southern African lions. The two groups probably diverged about 186,000–128,000 years ago. It is thought that the Asiatic lion remained connected to North and Central African lions until gene flow was interrupted due to extinction of lions in Western Eurasia and the Middle East during the Holocene.

Asiatic lions are less genetically diverse than African lions, which may be the result of a founder effect in the recent history of the remnant population in the Gir forest.

== Characteristics ==
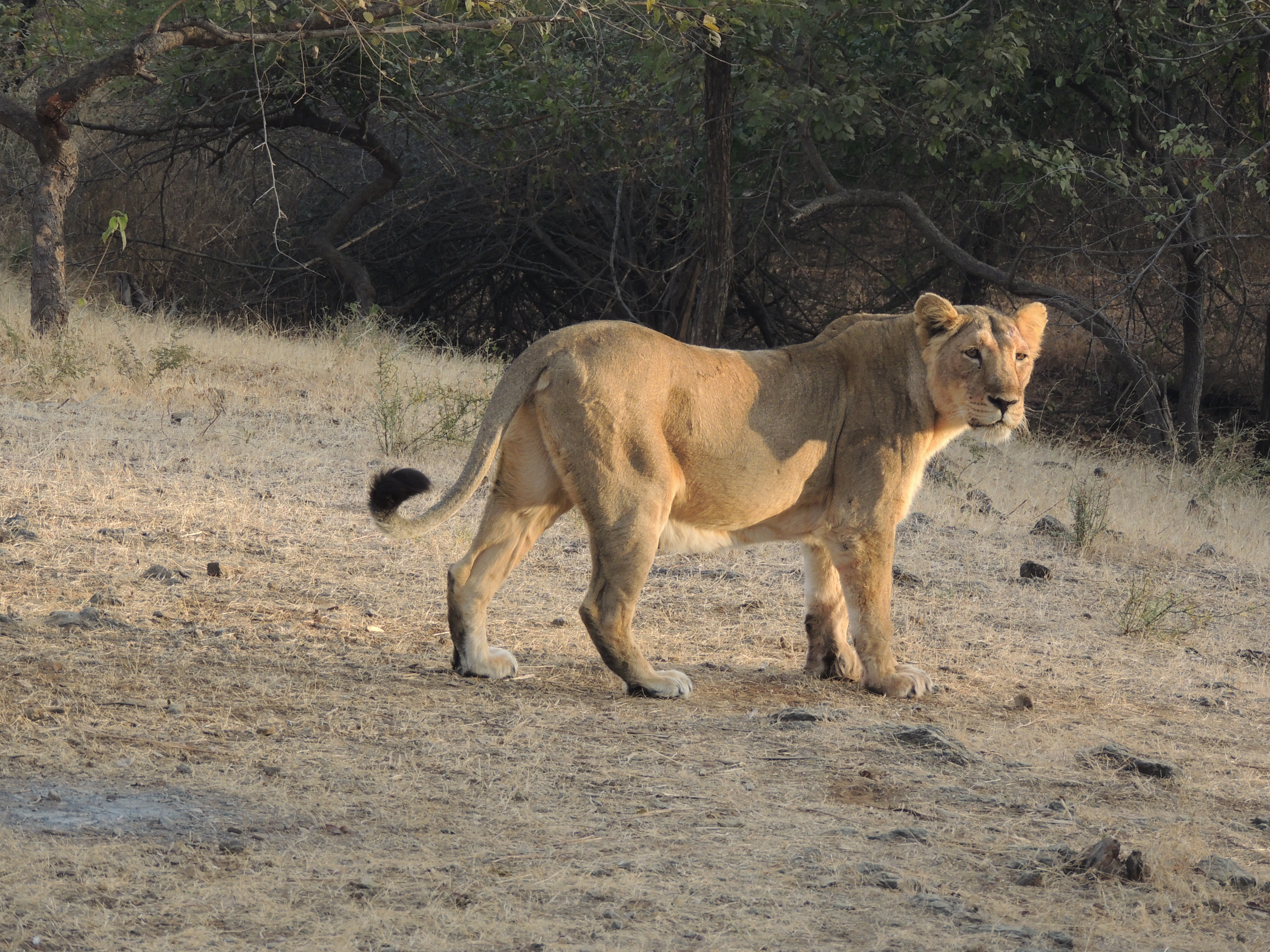
An Asiatic lioness

The Asiatic lion's fur ranges in colour from ruddy-tawny, heavily speckled with black, to sandy or buffish grey, sometimes with a silvery sheen in certain lighting. Males have only moderate mane growth at the top of the head, so that their ears are always visible. The mane is scanty on the cheeks and throat, where it is only 10 cm (3.9 in) long. About half of Asiatic lions' skulls from the Gir forest have divided infraorbital foramina, whereas African lions have only one foramen on either side. The sagittal crest is more strongly developed, and the post-orbital area is shorter than in African lions. Skull length in adult males ranges from 330–340 mm (13–13 in), and in females, from 292–302 mm (11.5–11.9 in). It differs from the African lion by a larger tail tuft and less inflated auditory bullae. The most striking morphological character of the Asiatic lion is a longitudinal fold of skin running along its belly.

Males have a shoulder height of up to 107–120 cm (42–47 in), and females of 80–107 cm (31–42 in). Two lions in Gir forest measured 1.98 m (78 in) from head to body with a 0.79–0.89 m (31–35 in) long tail and total lengths of 2.82–2.87 m (111–113 in). An adult male Asiatic lion weighs 160.1 kg (353 lb) on average with the limit being 190 kg (420 lb); a wild female weighs 100–130 kg (220–290 lb).

=== Manes ===
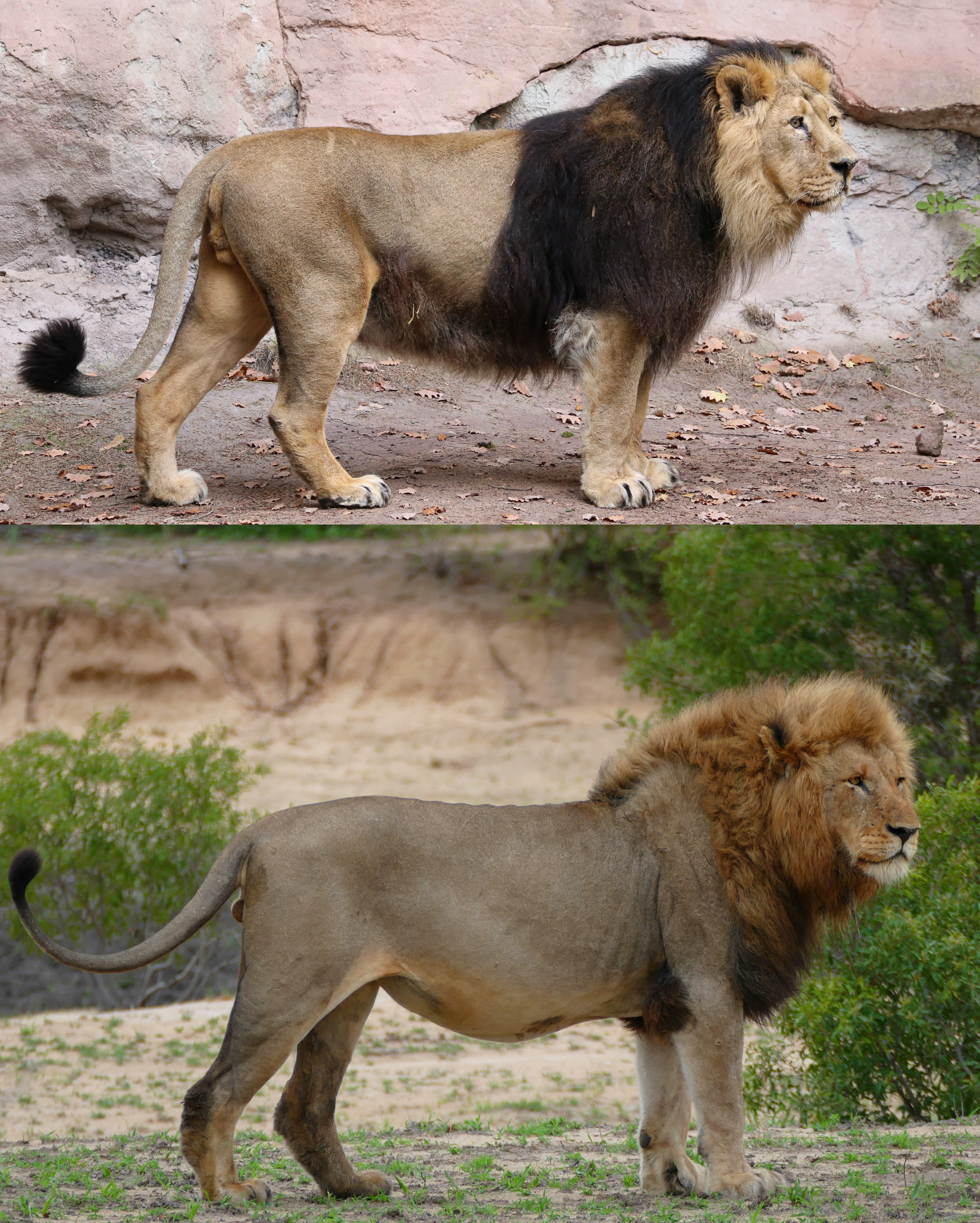
Male Asiatic lion (above) and Southern African lion (below) with fully grown mane

Colour and development of manes in male lions varies between regions, among populations and with age of lions. In general, the Asiatic lion differs from the African lion by a less developed mane. The manes of most lions in ancient Greece and Asia Minor were also less developed and did not extend to below the belly, sides or ulnas. Lions with such smaller manes were also known in the Syrian region, Arabian Peninsula and Egypt.

=== Exceptionally sized lions ===
The confirmed record for the total length of a male Asiatic lion is 2.92 m (115 in), including the tail. Mughal emperor Jahangir allegedly speared a lion in the 1620s that measured 3.10 m (122 in) and weighed 306 kg (675 lb). In 1841, English traveller Austen Henry Layard, who accompanied hunters in Khuzestan, Iran, sighted a lion which "had done much damage in the plain of Ram Hormuz," before one of his companions killed it. He described it as being "unusually large and of very dark brown colour", with some parts of its body being almost black. In 1935, a British admiral claimed to have sighted a maneless lion near Quetta in Pakistan. He wrote "It was a large lion, very stocky, light tawny in colour, and I may say that no one of us three had the slightest doubt of what we had seen until, on our arrival at Quetta, many officers expressed doubts as to its identity, or to the possibility of there being a lion in the district."

== Distribution and habitat ==
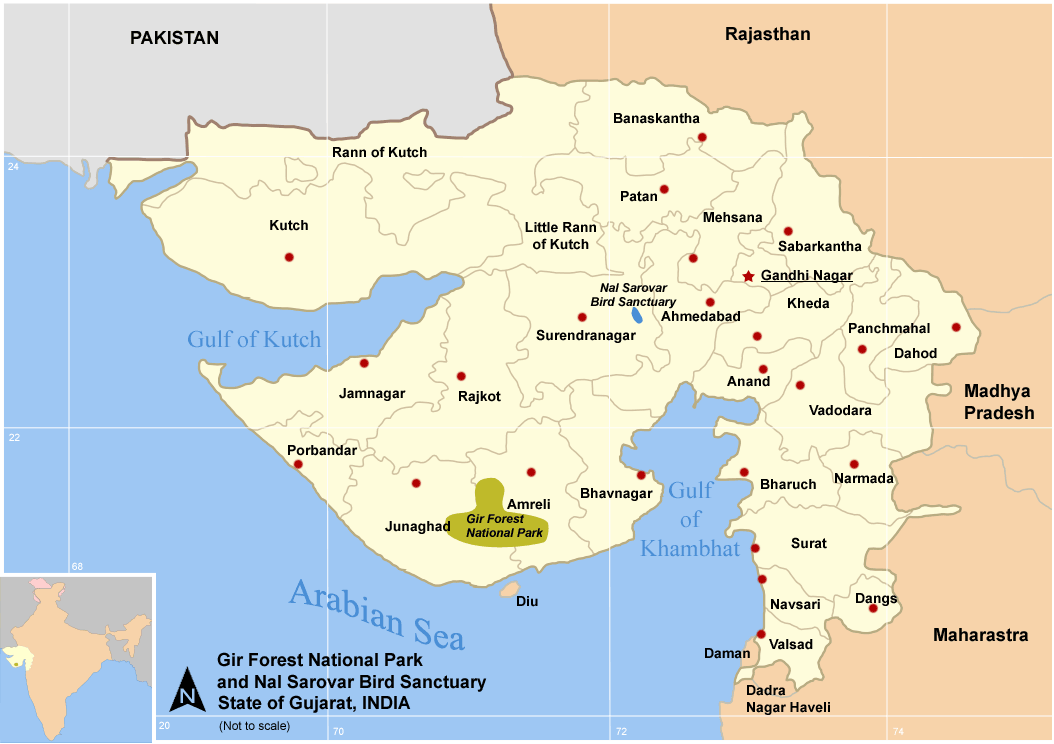
Map of Gir Forest National Park, Gujarat

In Saurashtra's Gir forest, an area of 1,412.1 km^{2} (545.2 sq mi) was declared as a sanctuary for Asiatic lion conservation in 1965. This sanctuary and the surrounding areas are the only habitats supporting the Asiatic lion. After 1965, a national park was established covering an area of 258.71 km^{2} (99.89 sq mi) where human activity is not allowed. In the surrounding sanctuary only Maldharis have the right to take their livestock for grazing.

Lions inhabit remnant forest habitats in the two hill systems of Gir and Girnar that comprise Gujarat's largest tracts of tropical and subtropical dry broadleaf forests, thorny forest and savanna, and provide valuable habitat for a diverse flora and fauna. Five protected areas currently exist to protect the Asiatic lion: Gir National Park, Gir, Pania, Girnar, and Mitiyala Wildlife Sanctuaries. The first three protected areas form the Gir Conservation Area, a 1,452 km^{2} (561 sq mi) large forest block that represents the core habitat of the lion population. The other two sanctuaries Mitiyala and Girnar protect satellite areas within dispersal distance of the Gir Conservation Area. An additional sanctuary is being established in the nearby Barda Wildlife Sanctuary to serve as an alternative home for lions. The drier eastern part is vegetated with acacia thorn savanna and receives about 650 mm (26 in) annual rainfall; rainfall in the west is higher at about 1,000 mm (39 in) per year.

The lion population recovered from the brink of extinction to 411 individuals by 2010. In that year, approximately 105 lions lived outside the Gir forest, representing a quarter of the entire lion population. Dispersing sub-adults established new territories outside their natal prides, and as a result the satellite lion population has been increasing since 1995. By 2015, the total population had grown to an estimated 523 individuals, inhabiting an area of 7,000 km^{2} (2,700 sq mi) in the Saurashtra region., comprising 109 adult males, 201 adult females and 213 cubs. The Asiatic Lion Census conducted in 2017 revealed about 650 individuals.

By 2020, at least six satellite populations had spread to eight districts in Gujarat and live in human-dominated areas outside the protected area network. 104 lived near the coastline. Lions living along the coast, as well as those between the coastline and the Gir forest, have larger individual ranges. By the time of the census, approximately 300–325 lions lived within Gir National Park, and the remainder was spread across the adjoining Amreli, Bhavnagar, and Gir Somnath Districts, with populations recorded in the Girnar, Mitiyala, and Pania Wildlife Sanctuaries in addition to areas outside protected zones. In 2024 and 2025, lions began swimming to Diu Island, separated from the mainland of Gujarat by a narrow channel. These individuals were relocated to Gujarat on request of the Diu administration over concerns of disruption to human life, although conservationists protested the removal as unnecessary.

A survey in May 2025 revealed that the lion population comprised 891 individuals in an area of 35,000 km^{2} (14,000 sq mi) spanning 11 districts, including 394 individuals in Gir National Park and adjoining areas, and 507 individuals in nine satellite populations and corridor areas; this constitutes an increase by 217 individuals and a range expansion by about 5,000 km^{2} (1,900 sq mi) since 2020.

=== Former range ===
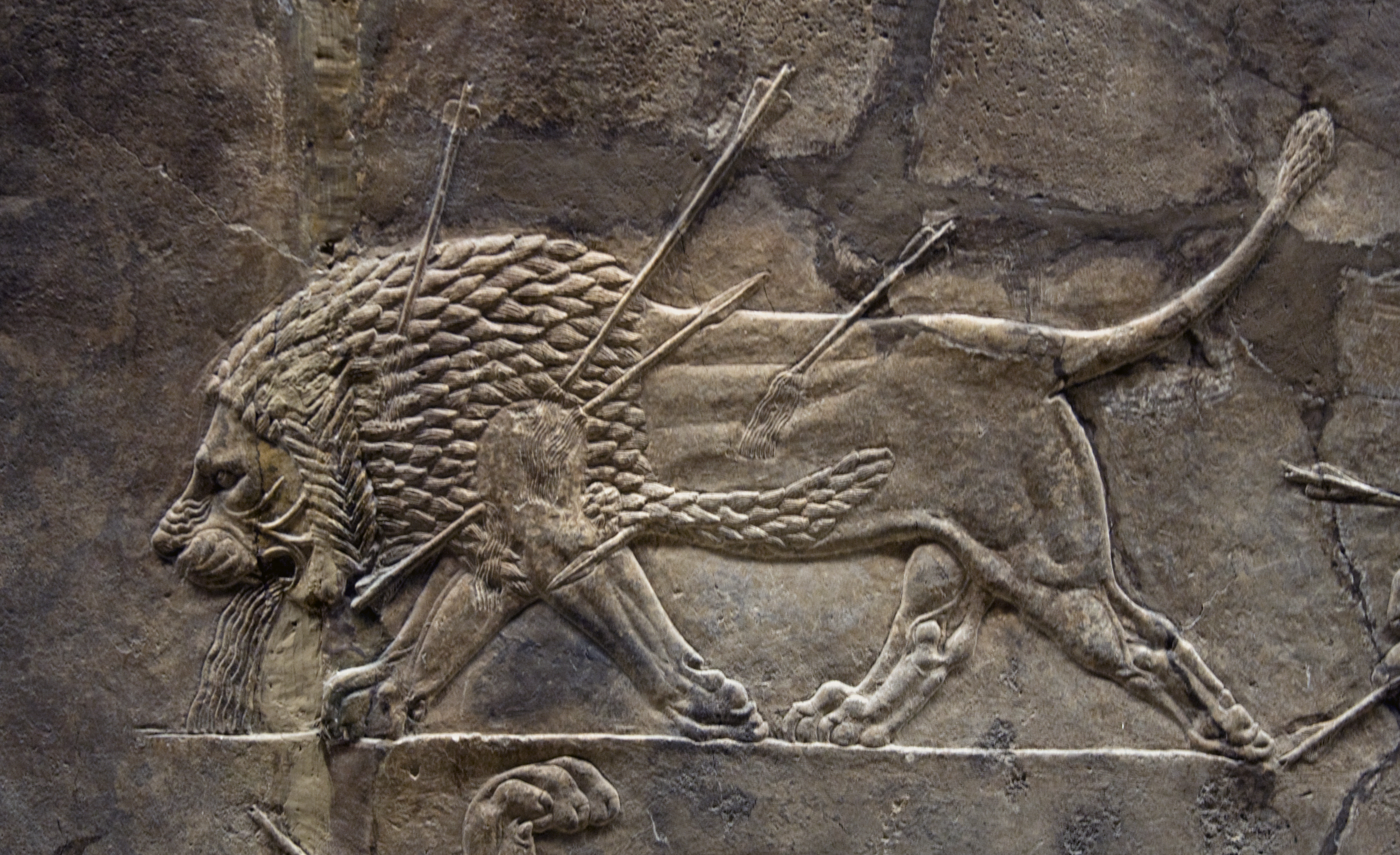
The Lion Hunt of Ashurbanipal, a sequence of Assyrian palace reliefs, Nineveh, Mesopotamia, 7th century BCE

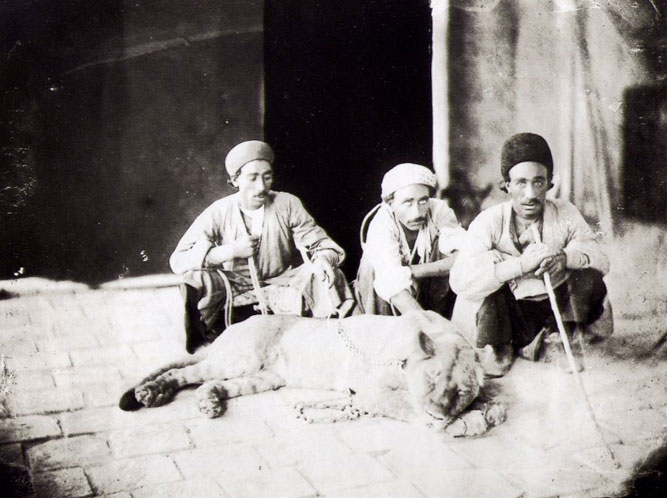
Men with a chained lion in Iran c. 1880. Photo by Antoin Sevruguin from the National Museum of Ethnology

During the Holocene, from around 6,500 years ago and possibly as early as 8,000 years ago, the lion colonised Southeast Europe including Bulgaria, Greece, parts of central and eastern Europe. Analysis of remains of these lions suggests that they did not differ from today's Asiatic lion. Historical records suggest that the lion became extinct in Europe during Classical antiquity, though it has been suggested that some may have survived as late as the Middle Ages in Ukraine.

The Asiatic lion used to occur in Arabia, the Levant, Mesopotamia and Baluchistan. In South Caucasia, it was known since the Holocene and became extinct in the 10th century. Until the middle of the 19th century, it survived in regions adjoining Mesopotamia and Syria, and was still sighted in the upper reaches of the Euphrates River in the early 1870s. By the late 19th century, it had become extinct in Saudi Arabia and Turkey. The last known lion in Iraq was killed on the lower Tigris in 1918.

Historical records in Iran indicate that it ranged from the Khuzestan Plain to Fars province at elevations below 2,000 m (6,600 ft) in steppe vegetation and pistachio-almond woodlands. It was widespread in the country, but in the 1870s, it was sighted only on the western slopes of the Zagros Mountains, and in the forest regions south of Shiraz. It served as the national emblem and appeared on the country's flag. Some of the country's last lions were sighted in 1941 between Shiraz and Jahrom in Fars province, and in 1942, a lion was spotted about 65 km (40 mi) northwest of Dezful. In 1944, the corpse of a lioness was found on the banks of the Karun River in Iran's Khuzestan province.

In India, the Asiatic lion occurred in Sind, Bahawalpur, Punjab, Gujarat, Rajasthan, Haryana, Bihar and eastward as far as Palamau and Rewa, Madhya Pradesh in the early 19th century. It once ranged to Bangladesh in the east and up to Narmada River in the south. Because of the lion's restricted distribution in India, Reginald Innes Pocock assumed that it arrived from Europe, entering southwestern Asia through Balochistan only recently, before humans started limiting its dispersal in the country. The advent and increasing availability of firearms led to its local extirpation over large areas. Heavy hunting by British colonial officers and Indian rulers caused a steady and marked decline of lion numbers in the country. Lions were exterminated in Palamau by 1814, in Baroda State, Hariana and Ahmedabad district in the 1830s, in Kot Diji and Damoh district in the 1840s. During the Indian Rebellion of 1857, a British officer shot 300 lions. The last lions of Gwalior and Rewah were shot in the 1860s. One lion was killed near Allahabad in 1866. The last lion of Mount Abu in Rajasthan was spotted in 1872. By the late 1870s, lions were extinct in Rajasthan. By 1880, no lion survived in Guna, Deesa and Palanpur districts, and only about a dozen lions were left in Junagadh district. By the turn of the century, the Gir forest held the only Asiatic lion population in India, which was protected by the Nawab of Junagarh in his private hunting grounds.

== Ecology and behaviour ==
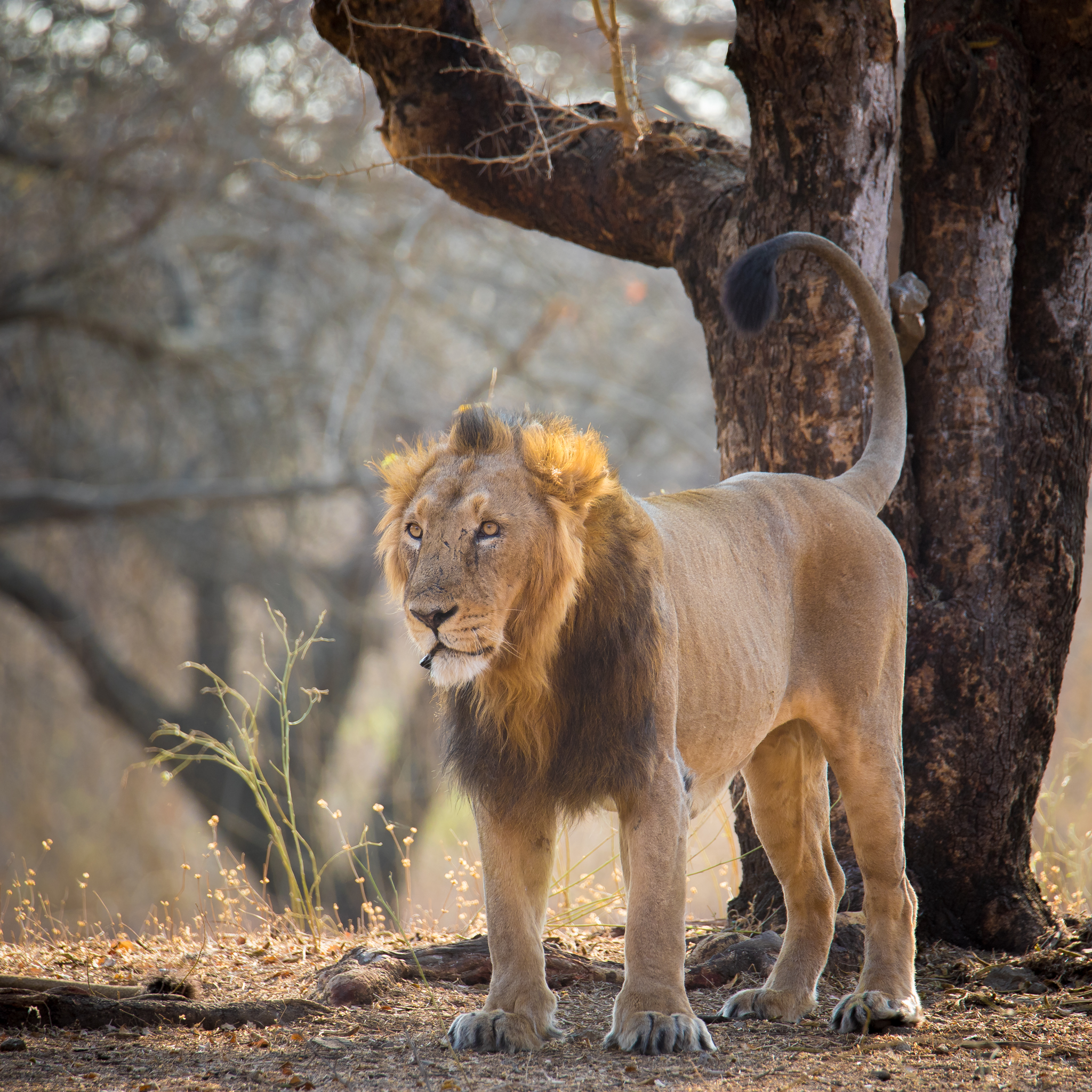
A male lion scent marking his territory

Male Asiatic lions are solitary, or associate with up to three males, forming a loose pride. Pairs of males rest, hunt and feed together, and display marking behaviour at the same sites. Females associate with up to twelve other females, forming a stronger pride together with their cubs. Female and male lions usually associate only for a few days when mating, but rarely live and feed together.

Results of a radio telemetry study indicate that annual home ranges of male lions vary from 144 to 230 km^{2} (56 to 89 sq mi) in dry and wet seasons. Home ranges of females are smaller, varying between 67 and 85 km^{2} (26 and 33 sq mi). During hot and dry seasons, they favour densely vegetated and shady riverine habitats, where prey species also congregate. Coalitions of males defend home ranges containing one or more female prides. Together, they hold a territory for a longer time than single lions. Males in coalitions of three to four individuals exhibit a pronounced hierarchy with one male dominating the others.

The lions in Gir National Park often spend the day resting and are more active at twilight and by night. Studies on captive Asiatic lions also indicated that they spent nearly most of the day time lying down or inactive, with juveniles spending slightly lesser time on inactive behaviours. The activity increased towards the twilight hours, when the lions spend more time on feeding, and walking. They also sometimes engage in self and social grooming. The lions also showed various levels of increased activity in response to perceived threat or other stimuli.

=== Feeding ecology ===
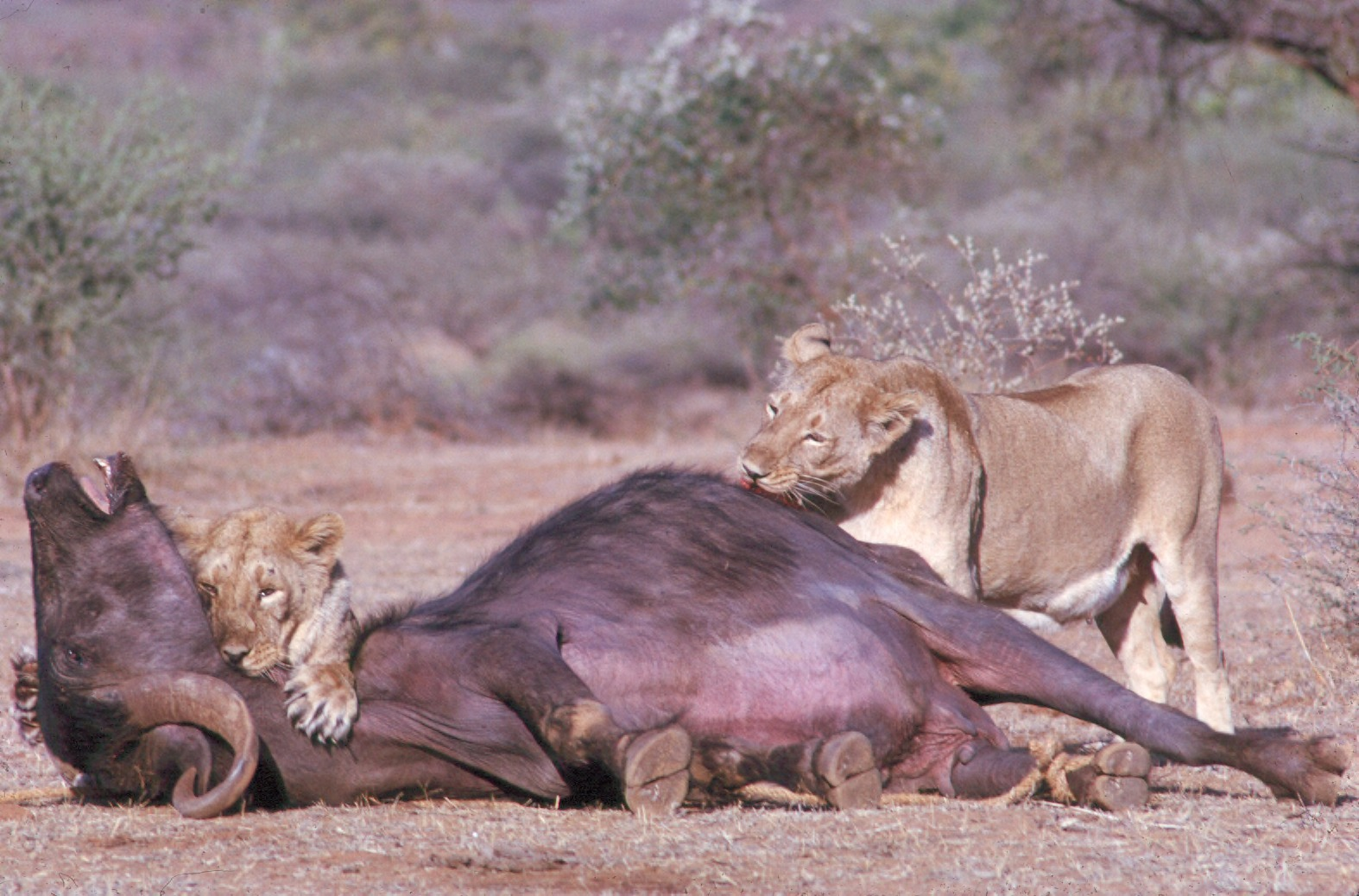
Asiatic lions killing a water buffalo

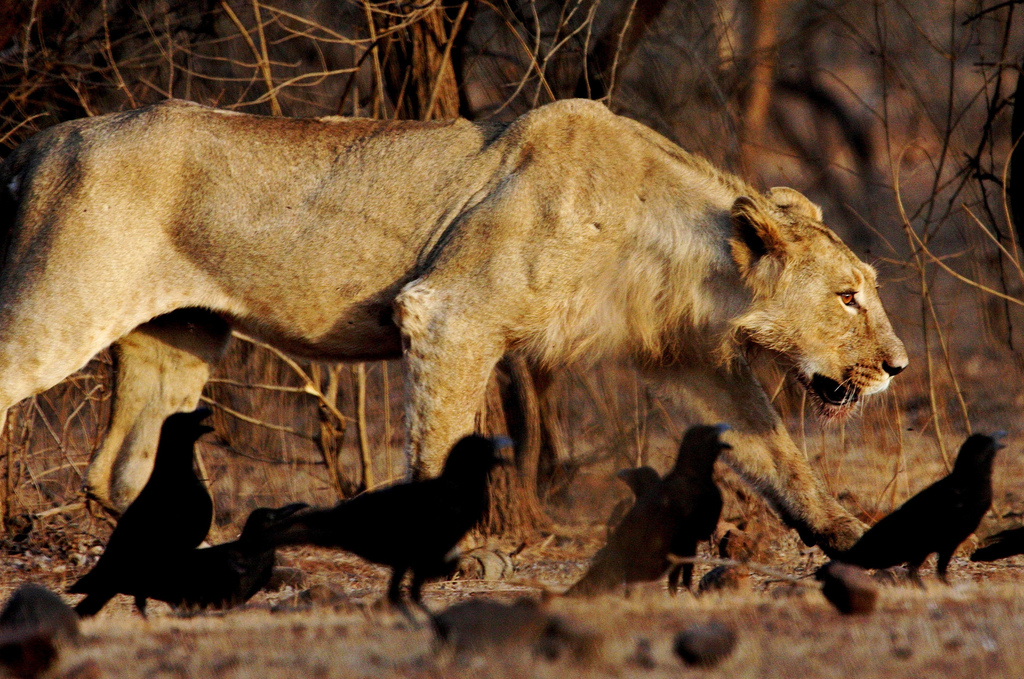
Lions often stalk their prey and usually charge towards the prey from close range

In general, lions prefer large prey species within a weight range of 190 to 550 kg (420 to 1,210 lb), irrespective of their availability. In the Gir forest, the lions' prey includes chital (Axis axis), nilgai (Boselaphus tragocamelus), sambar (Rusa unicolor), and less frequently wild boar (Sus scrofa). They most commonly kill chital, which weighs around 50 kg (110 lb) on average. They prey on sambar deer when the latter descend from the hills during the summer. Outside the protected area where wild prey species do not occur, Domestic cattle (Bos taurus), and water buffalo (Bubalus bubalis) have historically formed a major component of the Asiatic lions' diet in the Gir region. They also rarely prey on dromedary (Camelus dromedarius). They regularly visit specific sites within the protected area to scavenge on dead livestock dumped by Maldhari livestock herders. During dry, hot months, they have also been noticed to prey on mugger crocodiles (Crocodylus palustris) on the banks of Kamleshwar Dam.

In 1974, the Indian forest department estimated the wild ungulate population of the Gir forest at 9,650 individuals. In the following decades, with the decline of the lion population, the population of the ungulates grew consistently to 31,490 in 1990 and 64,850 in 2010, including 52,490 chital, 4,440 wild boar, 4,000 sambar, 2,890 nilgai, 740 chinkara (Gazella bennetti), and 290 four-horned antelope (Tetracerus quadricornis). The populations of domestic buffalo and cattle declined from 24,250 individuals in the 1970s declined to 12,500 by the mid-1980s in the Gir Conservation Area, largely following the resettlement of people. Though, the population of livestock later increased to 23,440 animals by 2010, the Asiatic lions had shifted their predation patterns by then, and very few livestock kills occurred within the sanctuary. Most of these kills occur in peripheral villages instead, and predation records indicate that the lions killed on average 2,023 livestock annually between 2005 and 2009, and an additional 696 individuals in satellite areas in around the Gir forest.

The lions generally kill most prey less than 100 m (330 ft) away from water bodies. They usually charge towards the prey from close range and generally jump on the backs of large prey to bring them down. They might also trip the legs of smaller prey, and later use their powerful jaws to snap the animal's neck or to strangle it to death. They later drag the hunted carcasses into dense cover.

The nocturnal behaviour of the lions shows a high temporal overlap with its prey such as nilgai, sambar, and wild boar. Females share large carcasses among each other, but seldom with males. Dominant males consume about 47% more from kills than their coalition partners. Aggression between partners increases when coalitions are large, but kills are small. In the Gir forest, the lionesses often made kills at times when they were least likely to be encountered by males, to prevent the carcass being shared with or stolen by males. The level of kleptoparasitism was lower in Asiatic lions, compared to their African counterparts. The lions spend more time eating hunted prey, rather than scavenged carcasses.

=== Reproduction ===
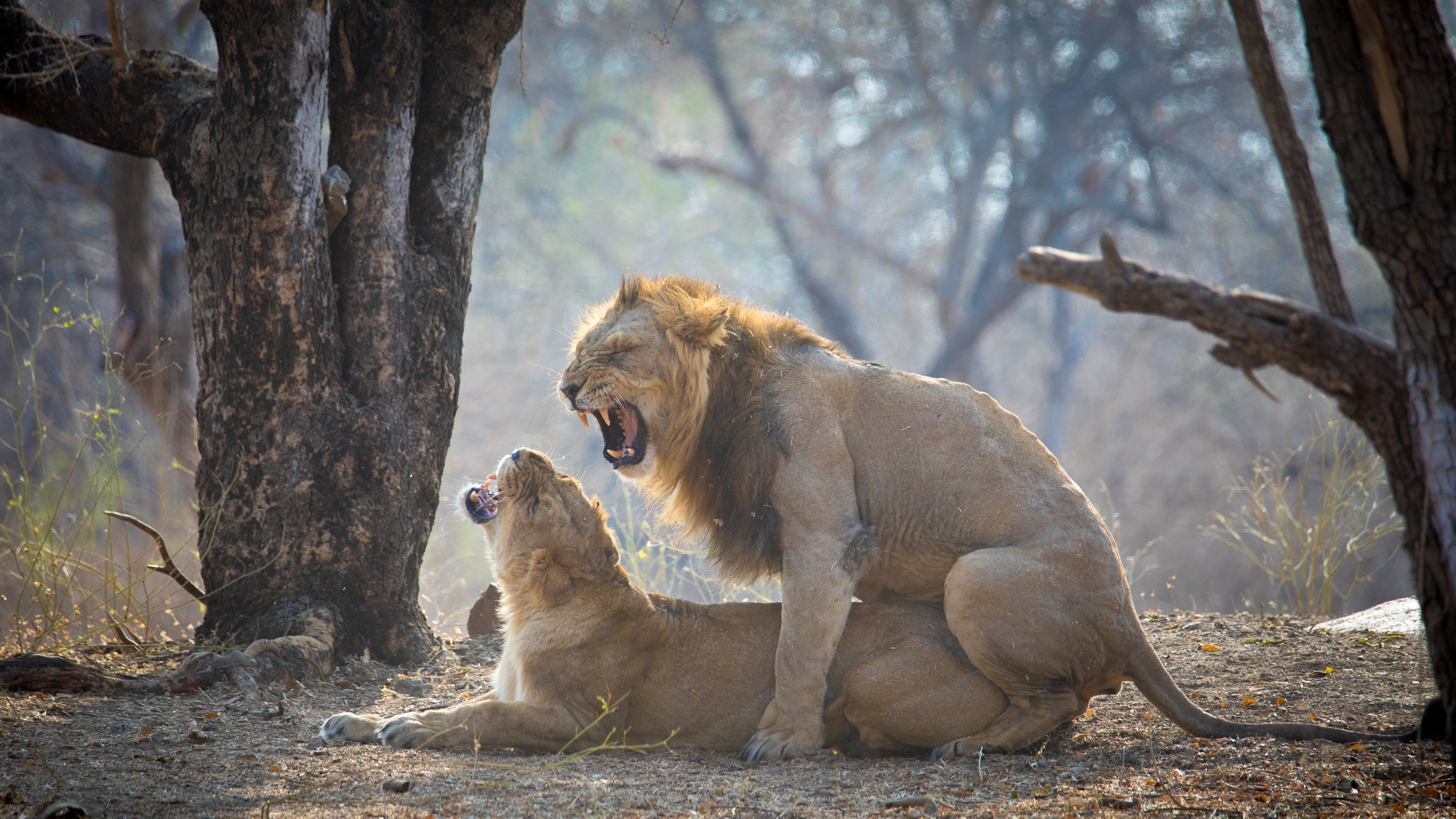
A pair of Asiatic lions mating

Asiatic lions mate foremost between October and November. Mating lasts three to six days. During these days, they usually do not hunt, but only drink water. Gestation lasts about 110 days. Litters comprise one to four cubs. The average interval between births is 24 months, unless cubs die due to infanticide by adult males or because of diseases and injuries. Cubs become independent at the age of about two years. Subadult males leave their natal pride latest at the age of three years and become nomads until they establish their own territory. Dominant males mate more frequently than their coalition partners. During a study carried out between December 2012 and December 2016, three females were observed switching mating partners in favour of the dominant male. Monitoring of more than 70 mating events showed that females mated with males of several rivaling prides that shared their home ranges, and that these males were tolerant toward the same cubs. Only new males that entered the female territories killed unfamiliar cubs. Young females mated foremost with males within their home ranges. Older females selected males at the periphery of their home ranges.

== Threats ==
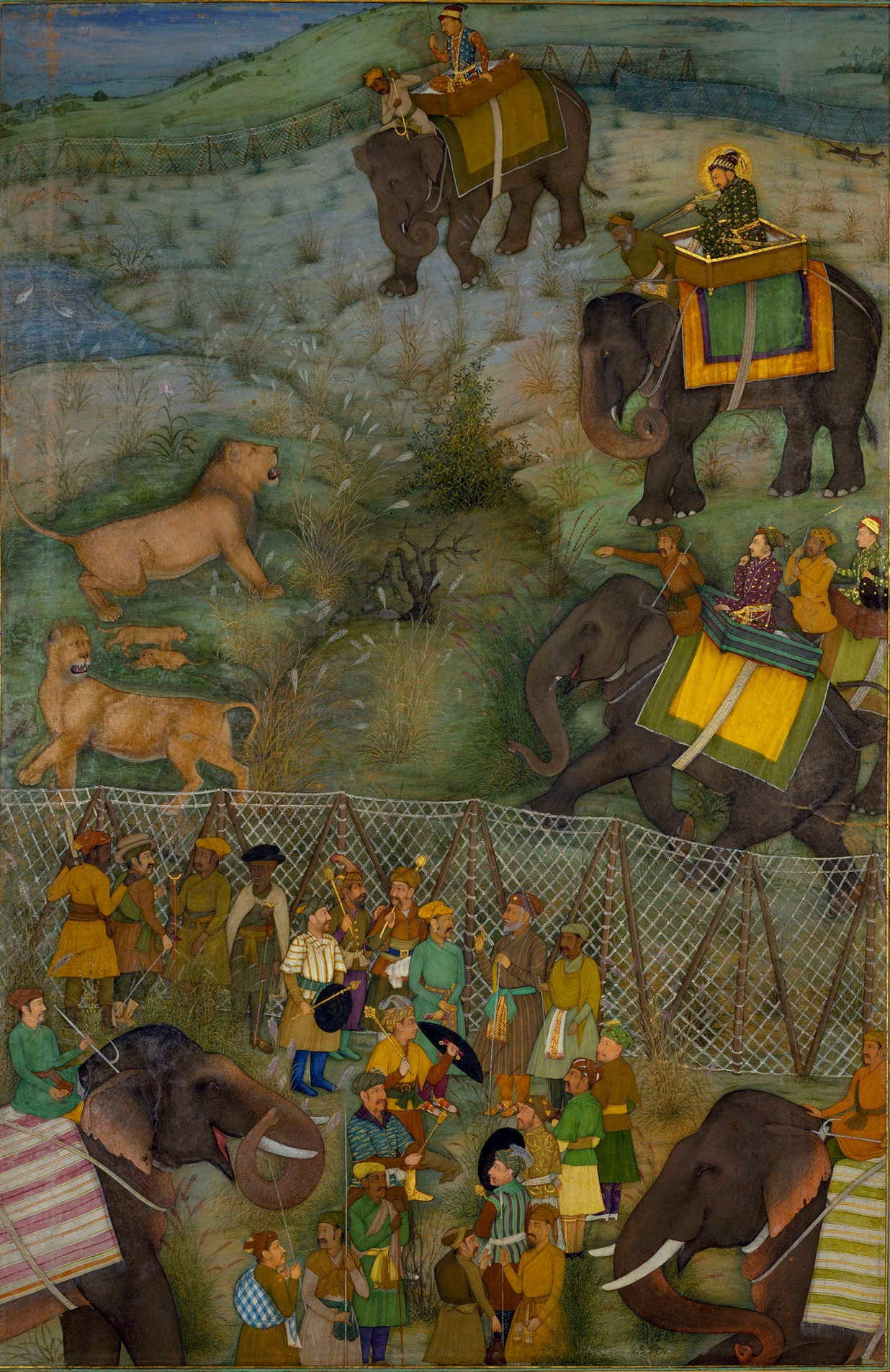
A painting of Mughal emperor Shah Jahan hunting lions in Burhanpur region (present day Madhya Pradesh) c. 1630

The Asiatic lion currently exists as a single subpopulation, and is thus vulnerable to extinction from unpredictable events, such as an epidemic or large forest fire. There are indications of poaching incidents in recent years, as well as reports that organized poacher gangs have switched attention from local Bengal tigers to the Gujarat lions. There have also been a number of drowning incidents, after lions fell into wells.

Prior to the resettlement of Maldharis, the Gir forest was heavily degraded and used by livestock, which competed with and restricted the population sizes of native ungulates. Various studies reveal tremendous habitat recovery and increases in wild ungulate populations following the resettlement of Maldharis since the 1970s.

Nearly 25 lions in the vicinity of Gir forest were found dead in October 2018. Four of them had died because of canine distemper virus, the same virus that had also killed several lions in the Serengeti.

=== Conflicts with humans ===
Since the mid-1990s, the Asiatic lion population has increased to an extent that by 2015, about a third resided outside the protected area. Hence, conflict between local residents and wildlife also increased. Local people protect their crops from nilgai, wild boar, and other herbivores by using electrical fences that are powered with high voltage. Some consider the presence of predators a benefit, as they keep the herbivore population in check. But some also fear the lions, and killed several in retaliation for attacks on livestock.

In July 2012, a lion dragged a man from the veranda of his house and killed him about 50–60 km (31–37 mi) from Gir National Park. This was the second attack by a lion in this area, six months after a 25-year-old man was attacked and killed in Dhodadar.

In November 2026, a lioness was run over by a train in Junagadh district, the first death of a lion by a train in Gujarat in over two years; in July 2024, two adults and two cubs were killed within a week.

== Conservation ==
Panthera leo persica was included on CITES Appendix I, and is fully protected in India, where it is considered endangered.

=== Reintroduction ===
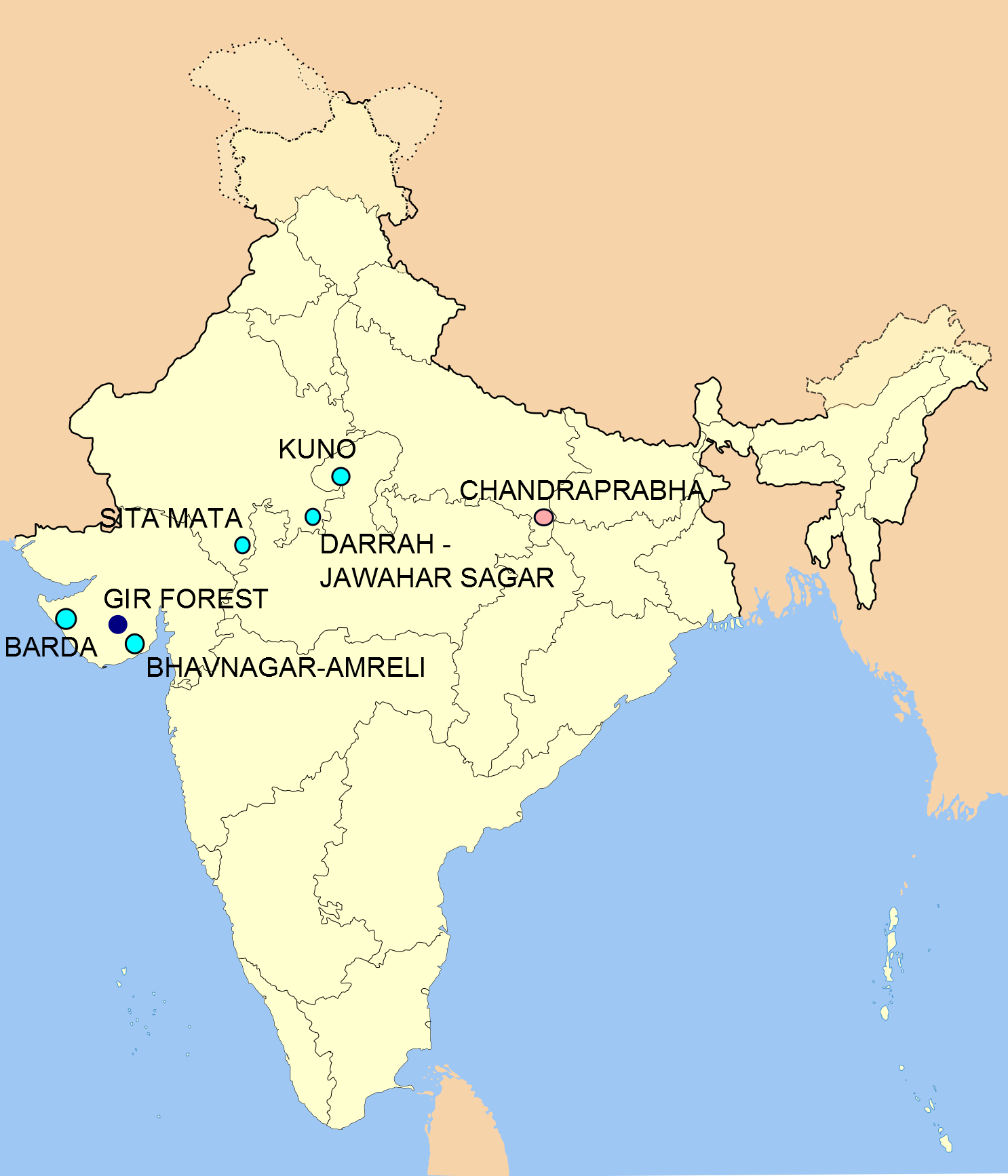
Proposed reintroduction sites in India;. Pink spots indicate former populations, turquoise spots indicate proposed sites

In the 1950s, biologists advised the Indian government to re-establish at least one wild population in the Asiatic lion's former range to ensure the population's reproductive health and to prevent it from being affected by an outbreak of an epidemic. In 1956, the Indian Board for Wildlife accepted a proposal by the Government of Uttar Pradesh to establish a new sanctuary for the envisaged reintroduction, Chandra Prabha Wildlife Sanctuary, covering 96 km^{2} (37 sq mi) in eastern Uttar Pradesh, where climate, terrain and vegetation is similar to the conditions in the Gir forest. In 1957, one male and two female wild-caught Asiatic lions were set free in the sanctuary. This population comprised 11 animals in 1965, which all disappeared thereafter.

In the early 1990s, the search for an alternative habitat for reintroducing the Asiatic lion was pursued, and several potential translocation sites were assessed in regards to existing prey populations and habitat conditions. The Palpur-Kuno Wildlife Sanctuary in northern Madhya Pradesh was ranked as the most promising location, followed by Sita Mata Wildlife Sanctuary and Darrah National Park. Until 2000, 1,100 families from 16 villages had been resettled from the Palpur-Kuno Wildlife Sanctuary, and another 500 families from eight villages were expected to be resettled. With this resettlement scheme the protected area was expanded by 345 km^{2} (133 sq mi).

Gujarat state officials resisted the relocation, since it would make the Gir Sanctuary lose its status as the world's only home of the Asiatic lion. Gujarat raised a number of objections to the proposal, and thus the matter went before the Indian Supreme Court. In April 2013, the Indian Supreme Court ordered the Gujarat state to send some of their Gir lions to Madhya Pradesh to establish a second population there. The Gujarat state government has resisted relocation of lions to other states.

=== In captivity ===
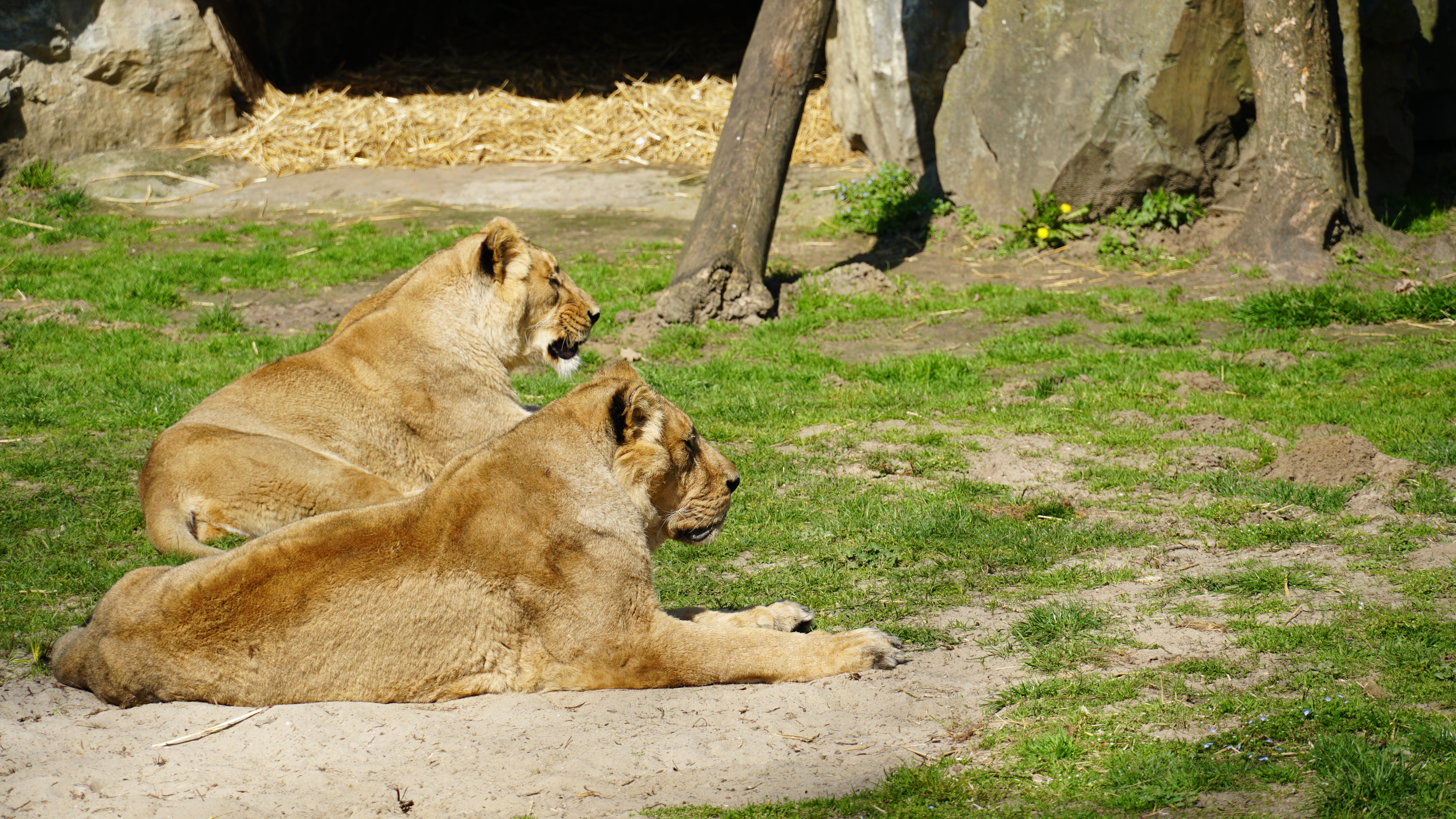
Lionesses at Planckendael

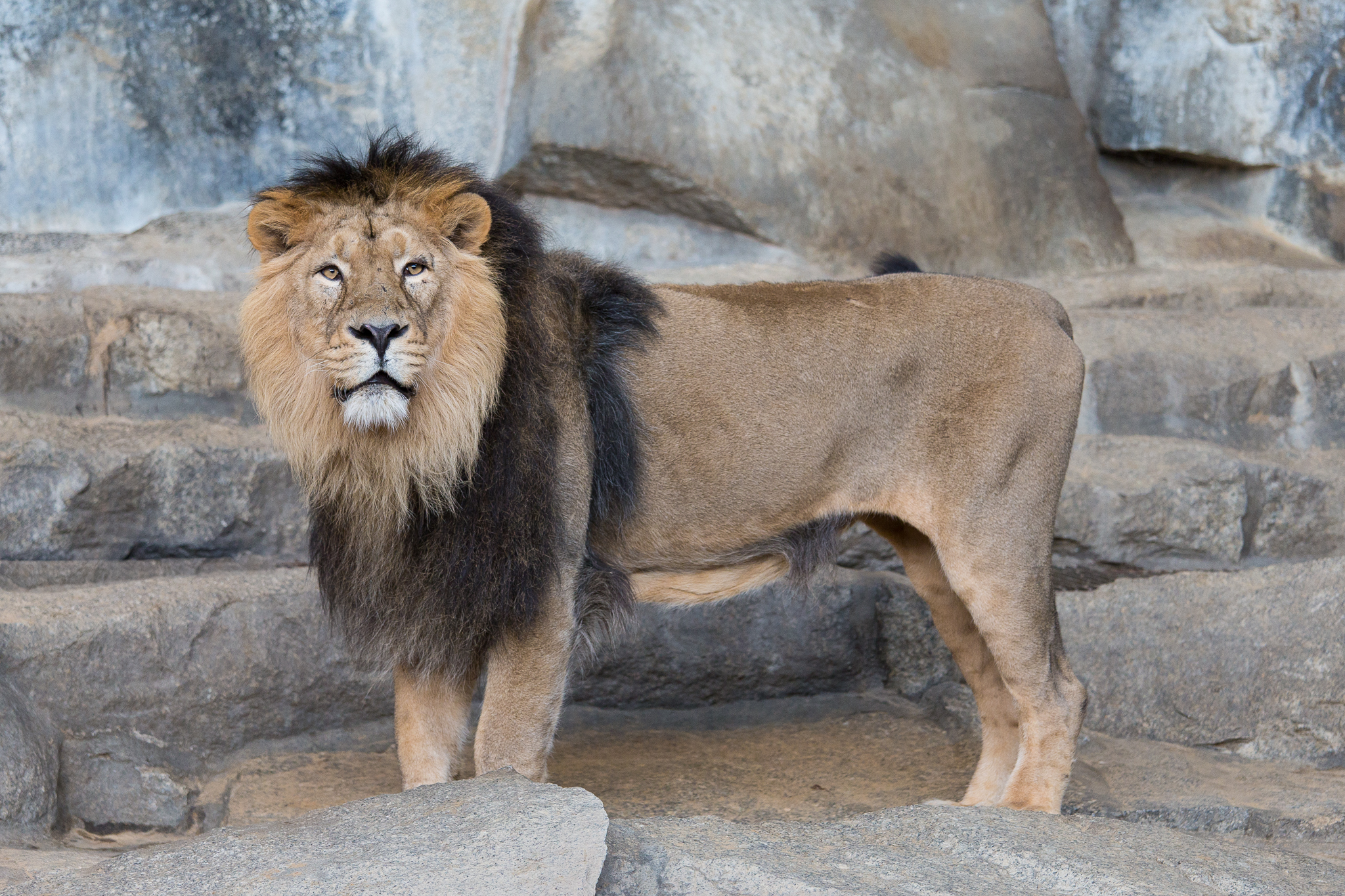
Male lion in Tierpark Berlin

The Asiatic Lion International Studbook was initiated in 1977, followed in 1983 by the North American Species Survival Plan (SSP). The North American population of captive Asiatic lions was composed of descendants of five founder lions, three of which were pure Asian and two were African or African-Asian hybrids. The lions kept in the framework of the SSP consisted of animals with high inbreeding coefficients.

In the early 1990s, three European zoos imported pure Asiatic lions from India: London Zoo obtained two pairs; the Zürich Zoologischer Garten one pair; and the Korkeasaari Zoo in Helsinki one male and two females. In 1994, the European Endangered Species Programme (EEP) for Asiatic lions was initiated. The European Association of Zoos and Aquaria (EAZA) published the first European Studbook in 1999. By 2005, there were 80 Asiatic lions kept in the EEP – the only captive population outside of India. As of 2009, more than 100 Asiatic lions were kept within the EEP. The SSP had not resumed; pure-bred Asiatic lions are needed to form a new founder population for breeding in American zoos. Until the late 1990s, captive Asiatic lions in Indian zoos were haphazardly interbred with African lions confiscated from circuses, leading to genetic pollution in the captive Asiatic lion stock. Once discovered, this led to the complete shutdown of the European and American endangered species breeding programs for Asiatic lions, as its founder animals were captive-bred Asiatic lions originally imported from India and were ascertained to be intraspecific hybrids of African and Asian lions. In North American zoos, several Indian-African lion crosses were inadvertently bred, and researchers noted that "the fecundity, reproductive success, and spermatozoal development improved dramatically."

DNA fingerprinting studies of Asiatic lions have helped in identifying individuals with high genetic variability, which can be used for conservation breeding programs.

In 2006, the Central Zoo Authority of India stopped breeding Indian-African cross lions stating that "hybrid lions have no conservation value and it is not worth to spend resources on them".

== In culture ==
=== South and East Asia ===
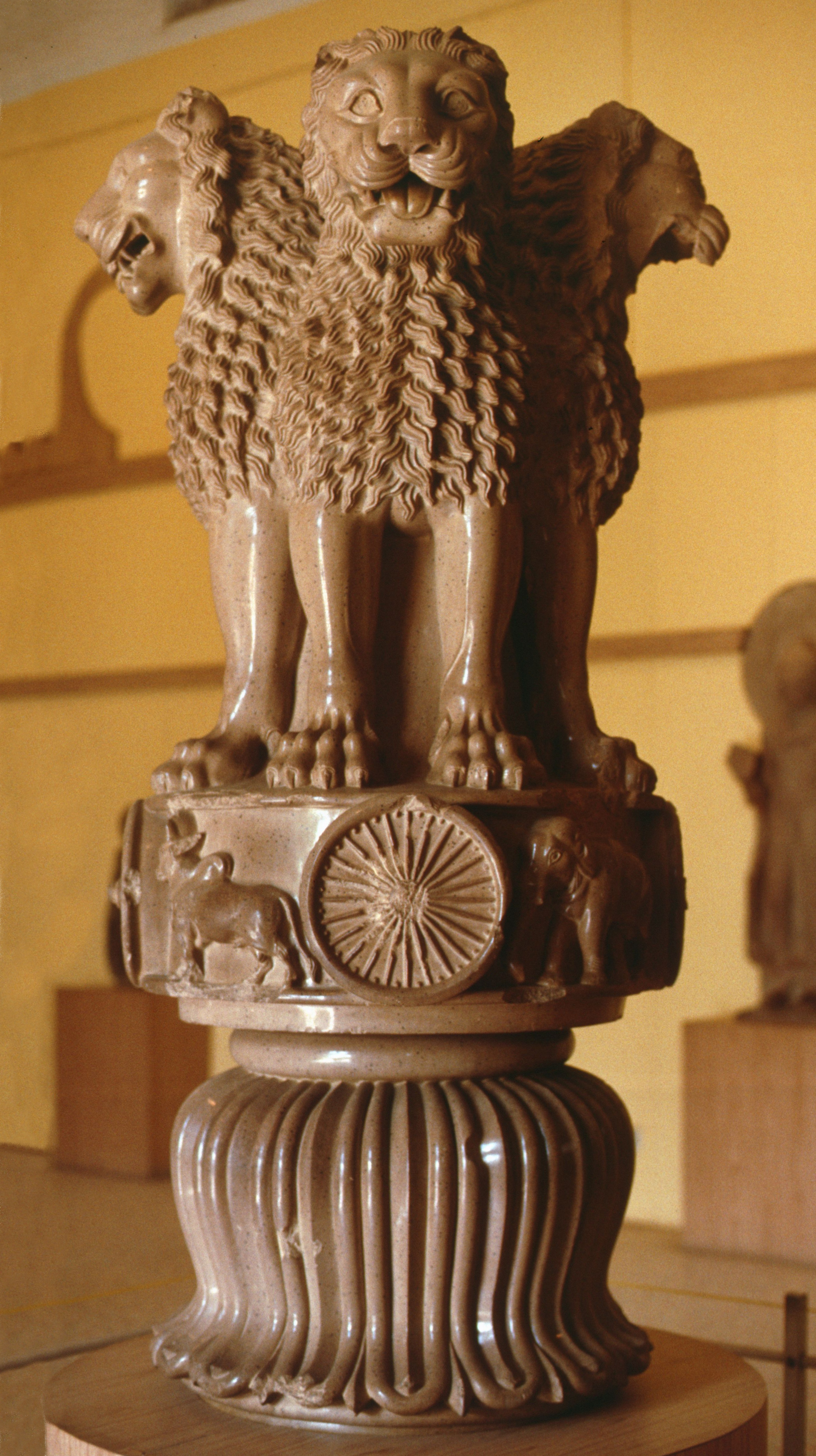
The original sandstone Lion Capital of Ashoka from Sarnath Museum, originally erected around 250 BCE atop an Ashoka Pillar at Sarnath

Neolithic cave paintings of lions were found in Bhimbetka rock shelters in Central India, which are at least 30,000 years old. The lion was a prominent symbol in various cultures and countries in South and East Asia.

- The Sanskrit word for 'lion' is 'सिंह' siṃhaḥ. Siṃha is one of the twelve months in the Hindu calendar. It is one of the twelve rāśis, that corresponds to Leo of the Zodiac.
- The Sanskrit name of Sri Lanka is 'Simhala' meaning 'Abode of lions' or 'Simhaladvipah' meaning 'Lion Island'. The Emblem and Flag of Sri Lanka consists of a golden lion passant holding a sword.
- Singapore derives its name from the Malay words singa 'lion' and pura 'city', which in turn is from the Sanskrit 'सिंह' siṃhaḥ and पुर pur, latter also meaning 'fortified town'. The Coat of arms of Singapore consists of a lion dexter.
- In early Buddhist architecture, the lion was considered auspicious, and hence it appeared as a symbol in various pillars and depiction of the Mauryan period from the 4th to 2nd century BCE). The Lion Capital of Ashoka, erected by the Mauryan emperor Ashoka in Sarnath (c. 250 BCE), consists of four lions, and later formed the basis of the Emblem of India.
- Bharat Mata, the national personification of India, is sometimes depicted accompanied by a lion.
- In Hindu mythology, the half man, half lion avatar of Narasimha is the fourth of the ten incarnations of Vishnu. The Hindu goddess Durga is depicted as riding a lion as her vahana (mount).
- In the Hindu epic of Mahabharata, Bharata is mentioned to deprive lions of their prowess.
- The lion is the symbol of Mahavira, the 24th and last Tirthankara in Jainism.
- The lion plays a prominent role in the Panchatantra, a collection of Indian animal fables, that was translated into Persian, Greek, and Hebrew languages as The Fables of Pilpay between the 8th and 12th centuries.
- In Meitei mythology and Sanamahism, Kanglā shā is a sacred guardian beast with a lion's body and a two-horned dragon's head.
- The earliest known Chinese stone sculptures of lions date to the Han dynasty at the turn of the first millennium. The lion dance is a traditional dance in Chinese culture that is strongly associated with Buddhism and known since at least the Han dynasty.
- Simhamukha is a lion-faced protector and dakini in Tibetan Buddhism.
- The lion is the third animal of the Burmese zodiac and the sixth animal of the Sinhalese zodiac.
- Cambodia has a native martial art called Bokator (Khmer: ល្បុក្កតោ, pounding a lion).
- The Asiatic lion has become a major source of ethnic and regional pride among the Gujarati people, a sentiment boosted by decades of state government and select environmentalist-led campaigns for its conservation; the dominant ethnolinguistic group strongly identifies with the lion, incorporating it into broader cultural and political expressions of local pride, such as Gujarati Asmita (Gujarati: ગુજરાતી અસ્મિતા, "Gujarati pride") or Gujarat ni Asmita (Gujarati: ગુજરાતની અસ્મિતા, "Pride of Gujarat").

=== West Asia and Europe ===
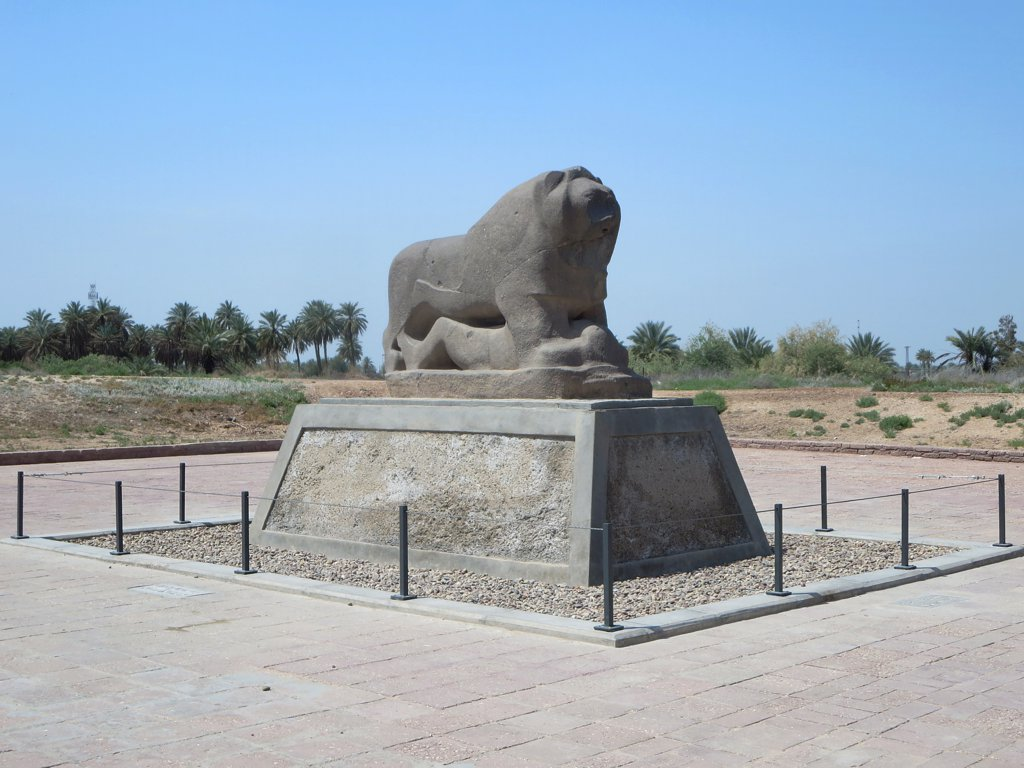
Lion of Babylon

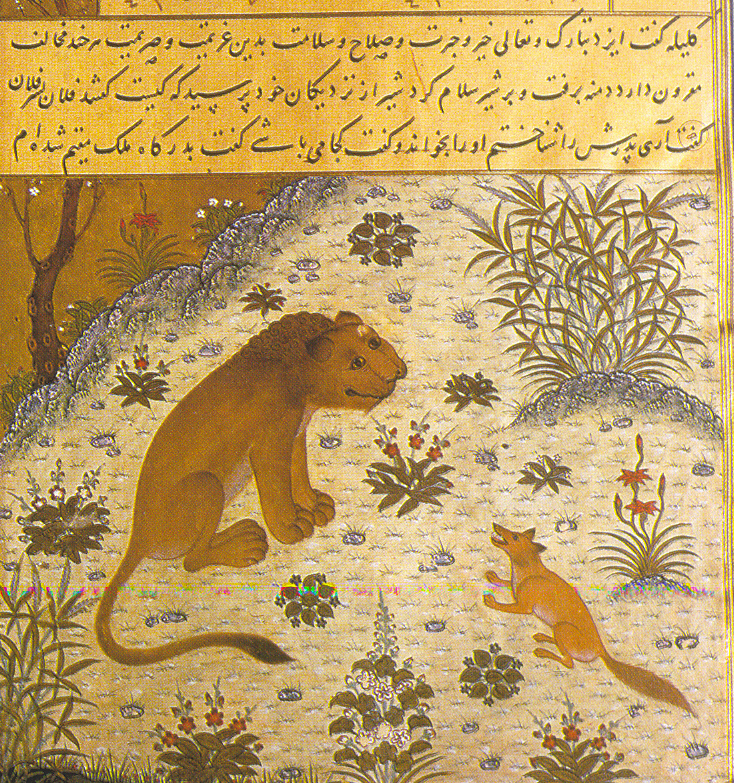
Lions in a 15th-century Persian manuscript at the Topkapi Palace Museum

The symbol of the lion is closely tied to the Persian people, and Achaemenid kings carried the symbol of the lion on their thrones and garments. The name 'Shir', also pronounced 'Sher' (Persian: شیر), is a part of the names of many places in Iran and Central Asia, like those of city of Shiraz and the Sherabad River, and had been adopted into other languages, like Hindi. The Shir-va-Khorshid (Persian: شیر و خورشید, "Lion and Sun") is one of the most prominent symbols of Iran, dating back to the Safavid dynasty, and was used on the flag of Iran until 1979. Lions are depicted on vases dating to about 2600 BCE that were excavated near Lake Urmia in Iran.

The lion was an important symbol in Ancient Iraq and is depicted in a stone relief at Nineveh in the Mesopotamian Plain. The Lion of Babylon is an ancient Babylonian symbol, which represented the King of Babylon. The lion of Babylon is a statue at the Ishtar Gate in Babylon. The lion has an important association with the figure Gilgamesh, as demonstrated in the Epic of Gilgamesh. The lion featured in the coat of arms of Iraq in the early 20th century and the Iraqi national football team is nicknamed "Lions of Mesopotamia".

The Asiatic lion has significance in Arab and Islamic culture. For example, Al-Muddathir criticizes people who were averse to Prophet Muhammad's teachings, such as that the rich have an obligation to donate wealth to the poor, comparing their attitude to itself, with the response of prey to a qaswarah (Arabic: قَسْوَرَة, meaning "lion", "beast of prey", or "hunter"). Other Arabic words for 'lion' include asad (Arabic: أَسَد) and sabaʿ (Arabic: سَبَع). Ali ibn Abi Talib and Hamzah ibn Abdul-Muttalib were given titles like Asad Allah (Arabic: أَسَد ٱلله, lit. 'Lion of God'). An Arabic toponym for the city of Beersheba (Arabic: بِئر ٱلسَّبَع) can mean "Spring of the Lion". The Lion of Judah is a Jewish national and cultural symbol, traditionally regarded as the symbol of the tribe of Judah. It is mentioned in the blessing given by Jacob to his fourth son, Judah, in the Book of Genesis of the Hebrew Bible. The lion makes appearances in the Bible, most notably as having fought Samson in the Book of Judges.

The Nemean lion of pre-literate Greek myth is associated with the Labours of Hercules. A Bronze Age statue of a lion from either southern Italy or southern Spain from around 1000–1200 years BCE, the "Mari-Cha Lion", was exhibited at the Louvre Abu Dhabi. Damnatio ad bestias was a form of Roman capital punishment where the condemned person was killed by wild animals, usually lions. Games held at the Colosseum included events where gladiators fought lions. Lion hunting was practised in the Caucasus by both locals and foreigners. The locals were called 'Shirvanshakhs'.

== See also ==
- In situ conservation
- Ex situ conservation
- Wildlife of India
- Wildlife of Iran
