= Lion of Babylon (statue) =

Stone sculpture in the ancient city of Babylon, Iraq

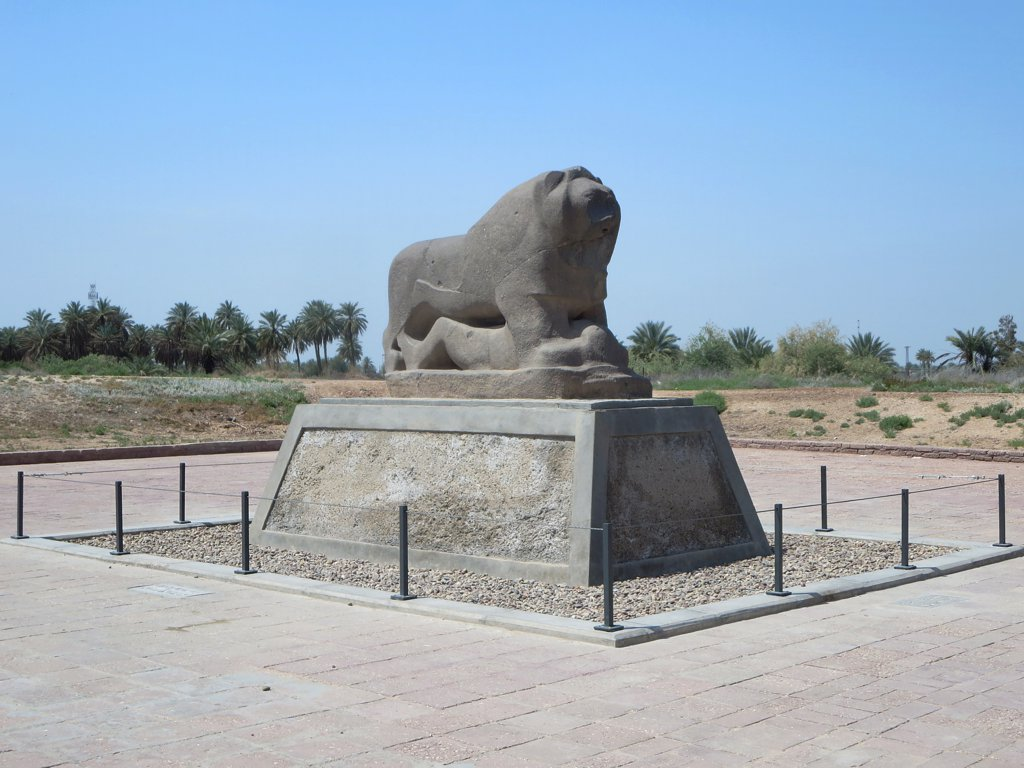
- Material: Basalt
- Height: 1 meter
- Created: c. 1595 BC
- Discovered: before 1818; Hillah, Babylon, Iraq
- Discovered by: Claudius Rich or Joseph Beauchamp
- Present location: Hillah, Babylon, Iraq

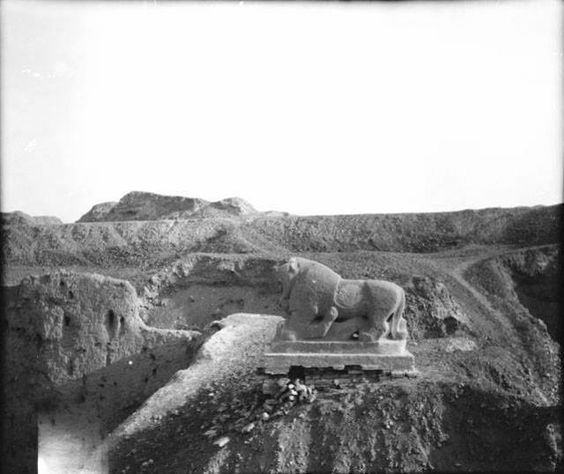
Lion of Babylon in 1909

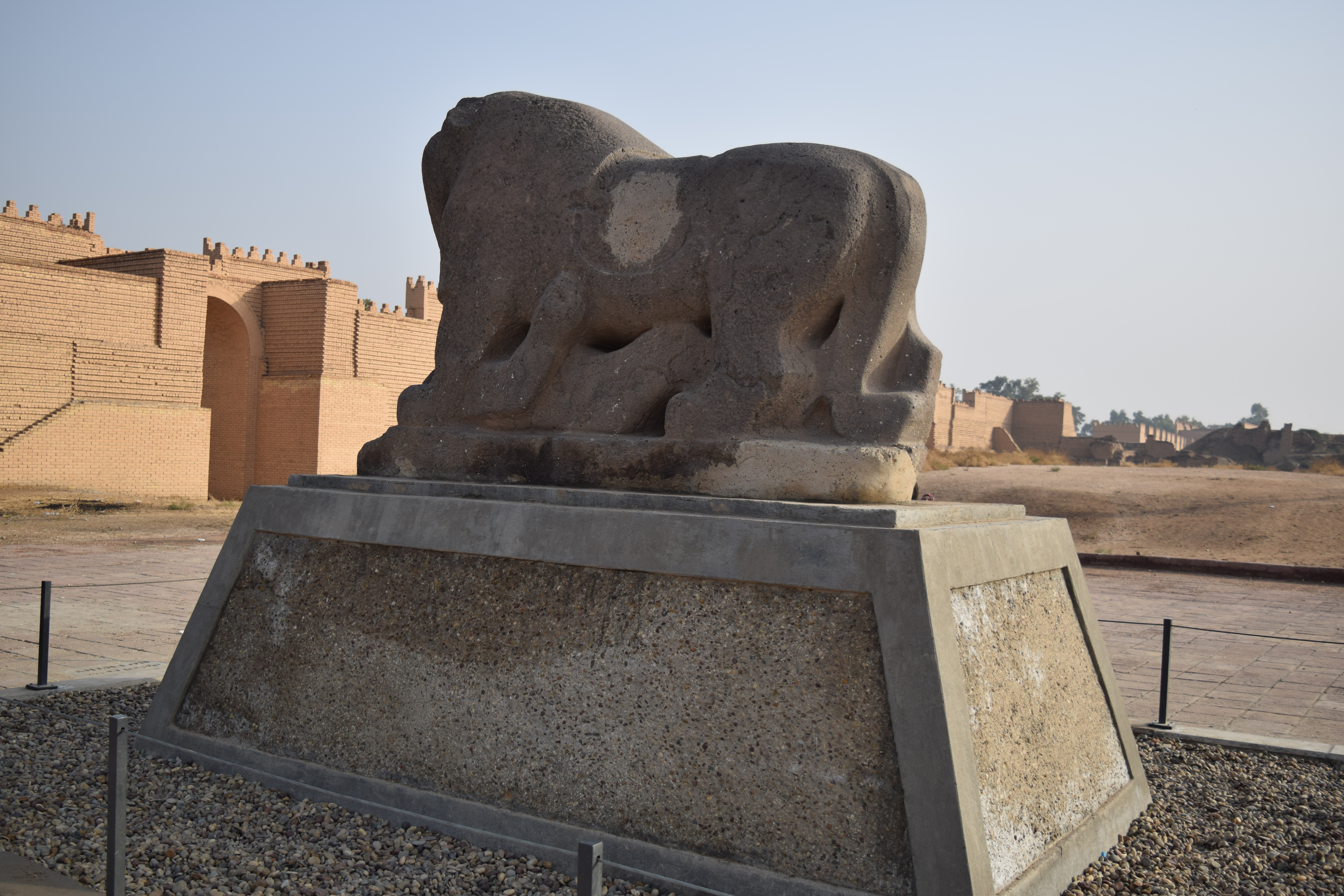
Lion of Babylon from the left side

Lion of Babylon is a stone sculpture, over 2,600 years old, that was found in the ancient city of Babylon, Iraq. Its discovery was first documented in 1817 by Claudius Rich, although it may have been seen as early as 1790 by Joseph de Beauchamp.

The statue may have been commissioned by the Chaldean Babylonian king Nebuchadnezzar II, but most experts now believe it is of Hittite origin, made during a Hittite occupation of the city.

== Description ==
The statue is made out of black basalt, is two meters in length, and the platform upon which it stands is one meter high. The lion weighs around 7000 kg. The statue's height is 1 meter.

It depicts a Mesopotamian lion above a supine human figure. The postures of the lion and human strongly suggest that they are having sexual intercourse. This interpretation is supported by the back of the lion, which contains a carved depression where it is believed that a saddle was originally placed, on which a figure of Ishtar, the goddess of fertility, love, and war, may have sat or stood.

== Modern history ==
The statue had been damaged over the years due to lack of protection, getting climbed on by tourists that left marks on the statue, or natural causes like erosion which archaeologists had already feared was going to happen without the right protection of the statue.

In 2013, the World Monuments Fund worked with the Iraq State Board of Antiquities to make improvements to the site. The Lion was cleaned and partially restored, the base of the statue was replaced, and a security barrier was added.

== Symbolism ==
The Lion of Babylon is a historic theme in the region. The statue is considered among the most important symbols of Babylon in particular and Mesopotamian art in general. The statue is considered a national symbol of Iraq, it has been used by several Iraqi institutions such as the Iraqi Football Association.

== See also ==
- Ishtar Gate
- Lion Hunt of Ashurbanipal
- Lion of Basrah
- Lion of Babylon
