= Mitiyala Wildlife Sanctuary =

Wildlife sanctuary, Gujarat, India

- IUCN category IV (habitat/species management area)
- Interactive map of Mitiyala Wildlife Sanctuary
- Area: 18.22 km^{2} (7.03 sq mi)
- Established: 2004

Mitiyala Wildlife Sanctuary also known as Mitiyala Grasslands is situated near Mitiyala in Gujarat. The jungle was a part of erstwhile Bhavnagar princely state before independence of India in 1947. Mitiyala Wildlife Sanctuary occupies 18.22 km^{2} and its status was confirmed in 2004. It is home to almost 11 to 12 lions and leopards. Spotted deer and nilgai (blue bulls) are also found in this wildlife sanctuary. Lions often meander down to Sasan Gir forest as this sanctuary shares a common boundary with the woodlands. The area between Gir and Mitiyala serves as passage connecting two habitat of wildlife.
