= Lion of Babylon =

Ancient Babylonian symbol

The Lion of Babylon from a portion of the Processional Way leading to the Ishtar Gate

The Lion of Babylon is an ancient Babylonian symbol.

== History ==
=== Antiquity ===
The Lion of Babylon symbolically represented the King of Babylon.

The depiction is based on the Mesopotamian lion, which used to roam in the region.

It represents Ishtar, goddess of fertility, love, and war.

=== Modern ===
The lion featured as the dexter supporter on the coat of arms of Iraq from 1932 to 1959.

== Gallery ==
Coat of arms of the Kingdom of Iraq 1932-1959 depicting the lion as the dexter supporter

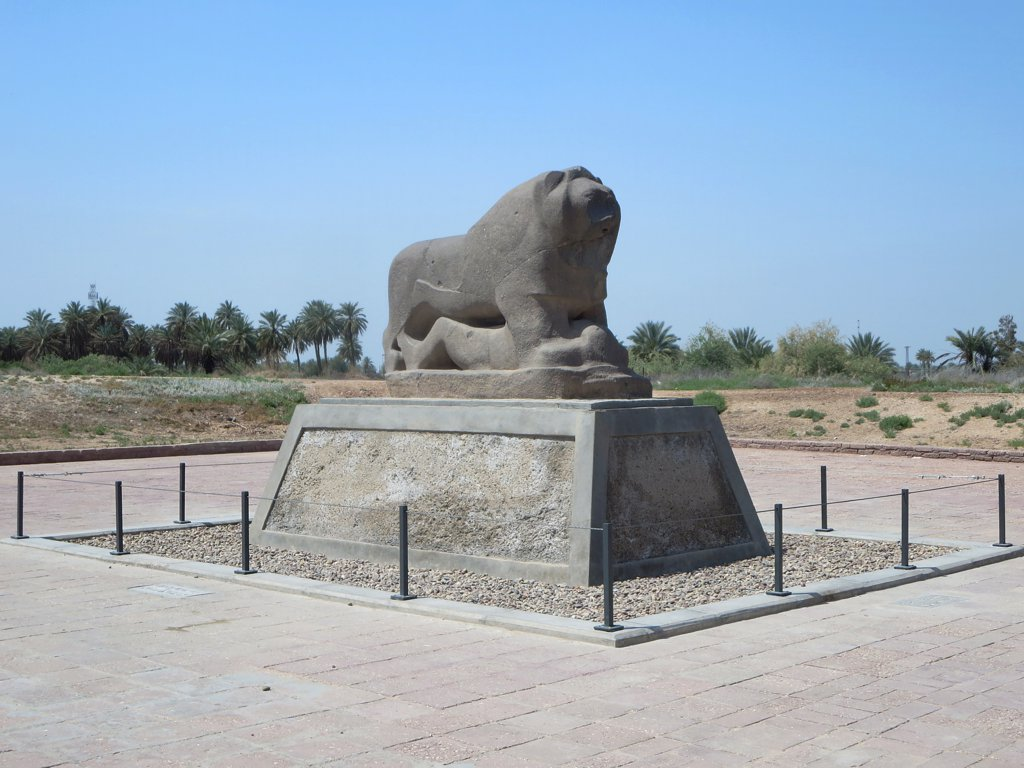
Lion of Babylon statue, built c. 6th century BCE and rediscovered in 1876 CE, Iraq

== See also ==
- Star of Ishtar
- Ziggurat
- Lion of Babylon (statue)
- Lion of Judah
