= Qarah Aghaj (river) =

Fars Province river

Qara Aqaj river
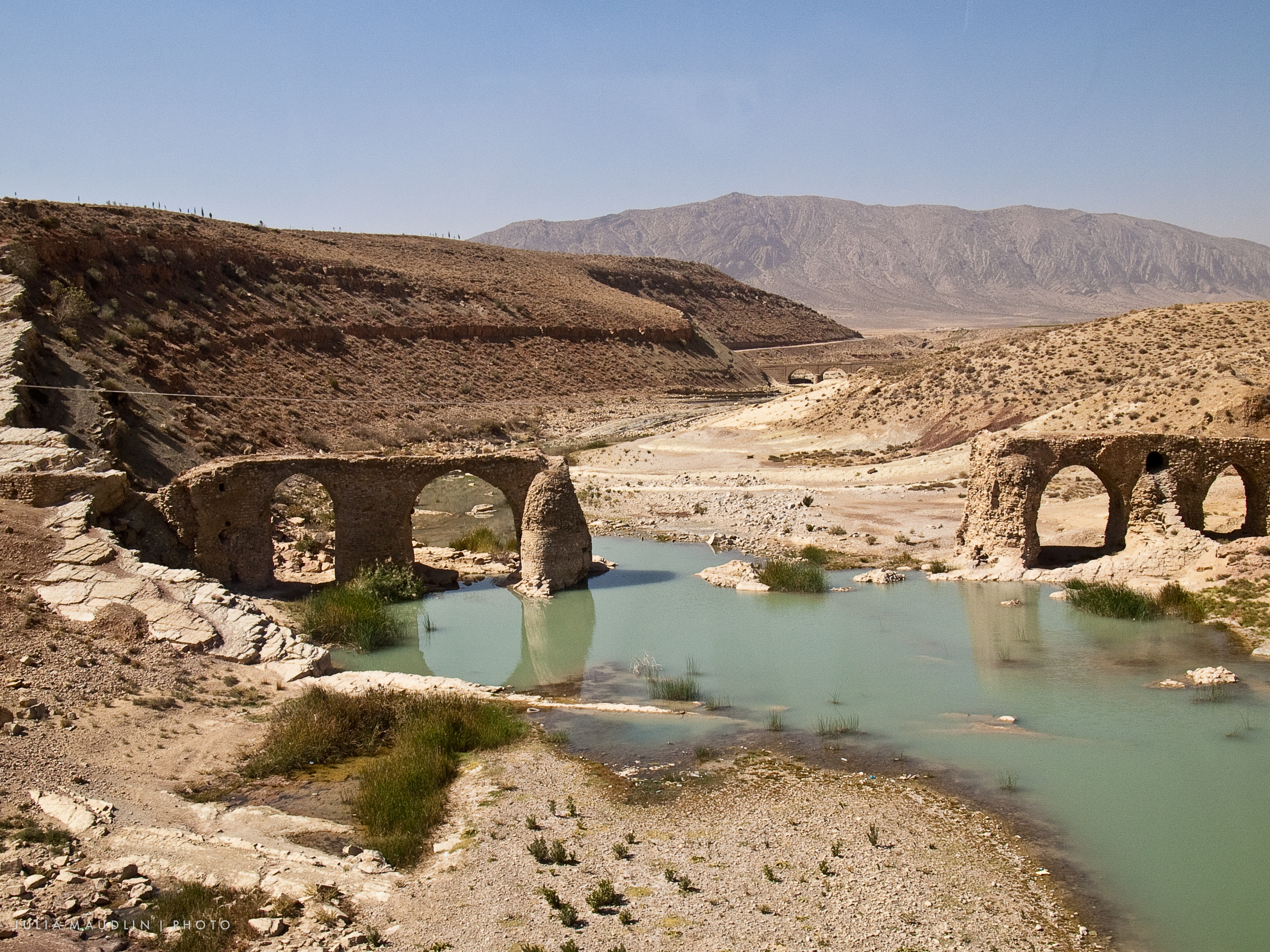
- Sasanian Bridge on Qarah Aqaj river in Kavar City

Location
- Country: Iran
- State: Fars

Physical characteristics
- Length: 700 km (430 mi)

Qara Aghaj (Persian: قر‌آغاج; from Turkic Karaağaç meaning elm) also known as Sekkan (Persian: سکان)is one of the most important rivers in the Fars province of Iran with a length of 700 km and its water is currently used for drinking and agricultural purposes. Salman Farsi Dam is located on the river between Jahrom, Simkan (Dozeh) and Qir and Karzin districts.

This river is formed by joining the springs of Kan Zard, Chehel Cheshmeh Koohmareh and Sarkhark in Khan Zanian and after leaving the Arjan section of Shiraz, it enters Kavar city and after passing through the agricultural lands of Kavar, Khafr, Simakan, Qir and Karzin through Mond river enters the Persian Gulf.

The water of this river is permanent, and its width reaches 20 meters in mountainous areas and 400 meters in the plains. The average annual flow of this river is 18 cubic meters per second at Tang Karzin station. The minimum flow in this station is 3.5 cubic meters per second and the maximum is 43 cubic meters per second. In the case of floods, the recorded statistics show a discharge of 6,000 cubic meters.
