= Seh Chah, Faryab =

Seh Chah سه چاه
- Village
- Interactive map of Seh Chah
- Coordinates: 28°47′04.6″N 53°20′23.0″E
- Country: Iran
- Province: Kerman
- County: Faryab
- Bakhsh: Central
- Rural District: Mehruiyeh

Area
  - Total: 0.507 km^{2} (0.196 sq mi)
- Elevation: 1,210 m (3,970 ft)

Population (2006)
  - Total: 73
  - Density: 140/km^{2} (370/sq mi)
- Time zone: UTC+3:30 (IRST)
  - Summer (DST): UTC+4:30 (IRDT)

Seh Chah (Persian: سه چاه, also Romanized as Seh Chāh) is a village in Mehruiyeh Rural District, in the Central District of Faryab County, Kerman Province, Iran. At the 2006 census, its population was 73, in 17 families.

The village is located along Se Chah Baghal Siah road, and the closest large city is Fath Abad. There are no locations of note in this place.
