= Tol-e Heydari, Mamasani =

Tol-e Heydari تل حيدري
- Village
- Location within Iran
- Coordinates: 30°04′33″N 51°28′51″E
- Country: Iran
- Province: Fars
- County: Mamasani
- Bakhsh: Central
- Rural District: Bakesh-e Yek

Population (2006)
  - Total: 22
- Time zone: UTC+3:30 (IRST)
  - Summer (DST): UTC+4:30 (IRDT)

Tol-e Heydari (Persian: تل حيدري, also Romanized as Tol-e Ḩeydarī) is a village in Bakesh-e Yek Rural District, in the Central District of Mamasani County, Fars province, Iran. At the 2006 census, its population was 22, in 4 families.
