= Hasan Khani, Qazvin =

Hasan Khani حسنخاني
- Village
- Location within Iran
- Coordinates: 36°31′21″N 49°31′00″E
- Country: Iran
- Province: Qazvin
- County: Qazvin
- Bakhsh: Tarom Sofla
- Rural District: Kuhgir

Population (2006)
  - Total: 22
- Time zone: UTC+3:30 (IRST)
  - Summer (DST): UTC+4:30 (IRDT)

Hasan Khani (Persian: حسنخاني, also Romanized as Ḩasan Khānī) is a village in Kuhgir Rural District, Tarom Sofla District, Qazvin County, Qazvin Province, Iran. At the 2006 census, its population was 22, in 9 families.
