= Seh Chah Gelal =

Seh Chah Gelal سه چاه گلال
- Village
- Location within Iran
- Coordinates: 31°05′56″N 50°43′02″E
- Country: Iran
- Province: Kohgiluyeh and Boyer-Ahmad
- County: Boyer-Ahmad
- Bakhsh: Ludab
- Rural District: Chin

Population (2006)
  - Total: 37
- Time zone: UTC+3:30 (IRST)
  - Summer (DST): UTC+4:30 (IRDT)

Seh Chah Gelal (Persian: سه چاه گلال, also Romanized as Seh Chāh Gelāl; also known as Seh Chāh) is a village in Chin Rural District, Ludab District, Boyer-Ahmad County, Kohgiluyeh and Boyer-Ahmad Province, Iran. At the 2006 census, its population was 37, in 8 families.
