= Kuhak Rural District (Jahrom County) =

Rural district in Fars province, Iran

Kuhak Rural District Persian: دهستان كوهك
- Rural District
- Location within Iran
- Coordinates: 28°26′16″N 53°51′18″E
- Country: Iran
- Province: Fars
- County: Jahrom
- District: Central
- Capital: Khorramabad

Population (2016)
  - Total: 2,062
- Time zone: UTC+3:30 (IRST)

Kuhak Rural District (Persian: دهستان كوهك) is in the Central District of Jahrom County, Fars province, Iran. Its capital is the village of Khorramabad. It lies within the Iran Standard Time Zone (GMT+3:30).

== Demographics ==
=== Population ===
At the time of the 2006 National Census, the rural district's population was 2,134 in 443 households. There were 2,062 inhabitants in 601 households at the following census of 2011. The 2016 census measured the population of the rural district as 2,062 in 601 households. The most populous of its 41 villages was Seh Chah, with 256 people.
