= Jolgah Rural District =

Rural district in Fars province, Iran

Jolgah Rural District Persian: دهستان جلگاه
- Rural District
- Location within Iran
- Coordinates: 28°29′45″N 53°26′22″E
- Country: Iran
- Province: Fars
- County: Jahrom
- District: Central
- Capital: Jahrom

Population (2016)
  - Total: 9,257
- Time zone: UTC+3:30 (IRST)

Jolgah Rural District (Persian: دهستان جلگاه) is in the Central District of Jahrom County, Fars province, Iran. It is administered from the city of Jahrom. The previous capital of the rural district was the village of Heydarabad.

== Demographics ==
=== Population ===
At the time of the 2006 National Census, the rural district's population was 18,977 in 4,224 households. There were 21,030 inhabitants in 5,325 households at the following census of 2011. The 2016 census measured the population of the rural district as 9,257 in 2,467 households. The most populous of its 126 villages was Sadeqabad, with 859 people.
