= Central District (Jahrom County) =

District in Fars province, Iran

Central District (Jahrom County) Persian: بخش مرکزی شهرستان جهرم
- District
- Location within Iran
- Coordinates: 28°29′45″N 53°35′22″E
- Country: Iran
- Province: Fars
- County: Jahrom
- Capital: Jahrom

Population (2016)
  - Total: 152,953
- Time zone: UTC+3:30 (IRST)

The Central District of Jahrom County (Persian: بخش مرکزی شهرستان جهرم) is in Fars province, Iran. Its capital is the city of Jahrom.

== Demographics ==
=== Population ===
At the time of the 2006 National Census, the district's population was 124,134 in 30,613 households. The following census in 2011 counted 137,055 people in 38,579 households. The 2016 census measured the population of the district as 152,953 inhabitants in 46,417 households.

=== Administrative divisions ===
Central District (Jahrom County) Population
| Administrative Divisions | 2006 | 2011 | 2016 |
|---|---|---|---|
| Jolgah RD | 18,977 | 21,030 | 9,257 |
| Kuhak RD | 2,134 | 1,917 | 2,062 |
| Jahrom (city) | 103,023 | 114,108 | 141,634 |
| Total | 124,134 | 137,055 | 152,953 |
RD = Rural District
