= Jahrom County =

County in Fars province, Iran

Jahrom County Persian: شهرستان جهرم
- County
- Location of Jahrom County in Fars province (center, pink)

- Location of Fars province in Iran
- Coordinates: 28°36′N 53°22′E
- Country: Iran
- Province: Fars
- Capital: Jahrom
- Districts: Central, Kordian, Simakan

Population (2016)
  - Total: 228,532
- Time zone: UTC+3:30 (IRST)

Jahrom County (Persian: شهرستان جهرم) is in Fars province, Iran. Its capital is the city of Jahrom.

== History ==
After the 2006 National Census, the village of Duzeh was elevated to the status of a city. In 2019, Khafr District was separated from the county in the establishment of Khafr County.

== Demographics ==
=== Population ===
At the time of the 2006 census, the county's population was 197,331 in 48,335 households. The following census in 2011 counted 209,312 people in 58,940 households. The 2016 census measured the population of the county as 228,532 in 70,187 households.

=== Administrative divisions ===
Jahrom County's population history and administrative structure over three consecutive censuses are shown in the following table.

Jahrom County Population
Administrative Divisions	2006	2011	2016
Central District	124,134	137,055	152,953
Jolgah RD	18,977	21,030	9,257
Kuhak RD	2,134	1,917	2,062
Jahrom (city)	103,023	114,108	141,634
Khafr District (Note: Transferred to Khafr County after the 2016 census)	42,199	40,535	42,263
Aliabad RD	7,138	6,454	5,860
Gel Berenji RD	7,281	8,080	8,650
Khafr RD	8,359	3,057	3,396
Rahgan RD	8,368	8,269	9,071
Sefidar RD	4,214	3,632	3,893
Bab Anar (city)	1,702	6,968	7,061
Khavaran (city)	5,137	4,075	4,332
Kordian District	14,025	13,691	14,851
Alaviyeh RD	6,006	5,542	5,813
Qotbabad RD	1,569	1,395	1,562
Qotbabad (city)	6,450	6,754	7,476
Simakan District	16,973	16,655	17,560
Pol Beh Bala RD	6,718	5,908	6,033
Pol Beh Pain RD	5,028	5,069	5,044
Posht Par RD	5,227	4,791	5,135
Duzeh (city)		887	1,348
Total	197,331	209,312	228,532
RD = Rural District

== Geography ==
Jahrom County is in the south of Fars province and has an area of 3,926 square kilometers. The county is bounded from the north by Khafr County, from the east by Fasa County and Zarrin Dasht County, from the south by Juyom County, from the west by Firuzabad County and Qir and Karzin County. The average altitude of this county is about 50 meters, and its highest point, Sefidar Peak, between Khafr county and Simakan District, is about 317 meters, and its lowest point is about 85 meters above sea level in Simian District. Qarah-Aghaj, and the Shur and Simakan rivers are among the waterways of Jahrom.

== See also ==
Media related to Jahrom County at Wikimedia Commons
