= Khaftar =

Khaftar خافتر، خافترک
- Village
- Location within Iran
- Coordinates: 28°46′09″N 53°17′25″E
- Country: Iran
- Province: Fars
- County: Khafr
- Bakhsh: Rahgan
- Rural District: North Rahgan

Population (2016)
  - Total: 576
- Time zone: UTC+3:30 (IRST)

Khaftar (Persian: خافتر, also Romanized as Khāftar; also known as Khāftarak) is a village in Rahgan-e Shomali Rural District, Rahgan District, in Khafr County of Fars province, Iran.

At the 2006 census, its population was 507 people, when it was in Rahgan Rural District, in Khafr District of Jahrom County.The 2016 census measured the population of the village as 576 people in 185 households.

In 2019, the district was separated from the county in the establishment of Khafr County, and Rahgan Rural District was transferred to the new Rahgan District. Gorizan was transferred to Rahgan-e Shomali Rural District created in the district.
