= Qaleh Kohneh-ye Aliabad =

Qaleh Kohneh-ye Aliabad قلعه کهنه علی آباد
- Village
- Location within Iran
- Coordinates: 28°59′51.54″N 53°05′31.15″E
- Country: Iran
- Province: Fars
- County: Khafr
- Bakhsh: Central
- Rural District: Aliabad
- Elevation: 1,337 m (4,386 ft)

Population (2016)
  - Total: 25
- Time zone: UTC+3:30 (IRST)

Qaleh Kohneh-ye Aliabad (Persian: قلعه کهنه علی آباد) is a village in Aliabad Rural District of Khafr County, Fars province, Iran. It is south of Aliabad village.

At the 2016 census, its population was 25 people in 8 households, when it was in Khafr District of Jahrom County.

In 2019, the district was separated from the county in the establishment of Khafr County, and the rural district was transferred to the new Central District.
