= Lard Khazan =

Lard Khazan لردخزان
- Village
- Location within Iran
- Coordinates: 28°49′56″N 53°08′04″E
- Country: Iran
- Province: Fars
- County: Khafr
- Bakhsh: Rahgan
- Rural District: Rahgan

Population (2016)
  - Total: 335
- Time zone: UTC+3:30 (IRST)

Lard Khazan (Persian: لردخزان, also Romanized as Lard Khazān) is a village in Rahgan Rural District, in Rahgan District of Khafr County, Fars province, Iran.

At the 2006 census, its population was 329, in 81 families, when it was in Khafr District of Jahrom County. The 2016 census measured the population of the city as 335 people in 113 households.

In 2019, the district was separated from the county in the establishment of Khafr County, and it was transferred to the new Rahgan District.
