= Abad Shahpur =

Abad Shahpur آباد شاهپور
- Village
- Location within Iran
- Coordinates: 28°57′54″N 53°10′58″E
- Country: Iran
- Province: Fars
- County: Khafr
- City: Bab Anar

Population (2016)
  - Total: 1,737
- Time zone: UTC+3:30 (IRST)

Abad Shahpur (Persian: آباد شاهپور, also Romanized as Ābād Shāhpūr; also known as Ābād Shāpūr) is a neighborhood in the city of Bab Anar in Khafr County, Fars province, Iran.

It was formerly a village in Khafr Rural District, in Khafr District of Jahrom County.

Abad Shahpur is known for its cultivation of citrus fruits.
