= Berayjan =

Berayjan برايجان
- Village
- Location within Iran
- Coordinates: 28°58′30″N 53°01′59″E
- Country: Iran
- Province: Fars
- County: Khafr
- Bakhsh: Central
- Rural District: Aliabad

Population (2016)
  - Total: 1,282
- Time zone: UTC+3:30 (IRST)

Berayjan (Persian: برايجان, also Romanized as Berāyjān and Barāyjān; also known as Barāi Jūn) is a village in Aliabad Rural District of the Central District of Khafr County, Fars province, Iran.

== Population ==
At the time of the 2006 National Census, the village's population was 1,708, when it was in the former Khafr District of Jahrom County. The 2016 census measured the population of the village as 1,282 people in 467 households.

In 2019, the district was separated from the county in the establishment of Khafr County, and the rural district was transferred to the new Central District.
