= Zar Qalat =

Zar Qalat زرقلات
- Village
- Location within Iran
- Coordinates: 28°51′48″N 53°08′43″E
- Country: Iran
- Province: Fars
- County: Khafr
- Bakhsh: Rahgan
- Rural District: Rahgan

Population (2016)
  - Total: 394
- Time zone: UTC+3:30 (IRST)

Zar Qalat (Persian: زرقلات, also Romanized as Zar Qalāt) is a village in Rahgan Rural District, in Rahgan District of Khafr County, Fars province, Iran.

At the 2006 census, its population was 419 people, when it was in Khafr District of Jahrom County. The 2016 census measured the population of the city as 394 people in 112 households.

In 2019, the district was separated from the county in the establishment of Khafr County, and it was transferred to the new Rahgan District.
