= Feshan =

Feshan فشان
- Village
- Location within Iran
- Coordinates: 28°55′06″N 53°14′39″E
- Country: Iran
- Province: Fars
- County: Khafr
- Bakhsh: Central
- Rural District: Gel Berenji

Population (2016)
  - Total: 1,078
- Time zone: UTC+3:30 (IRST)

Feshan (Persian: فشان, also Romanized as Feshān) is a village in Gel Berenji Rural District of Khafr County in Fars province, Iran.

At the 2006 census, its population was 915, in 226 families, when it was in Khafr District of Jahrom County. The 2016 census measured the population of the village as 1,078 people in 320 households.

In 2019, the district was separated from the county in the establishment of Khafr County, and the rural district was transferred to the new Central District.
