= Qaleh, Fars =

Qaleh قلعه
- Village
- Location within Iran
- Coordinates: 28°50′31″N 53°10′52″E
- Country: Iran
- Province: Fars
- County: Khafr
- Bakhsh: Rahgan
- Rural District: Rahgan

Population (2016)
  - Total: 345
- Time zone: UTC+3:30 (IRST)

Qaleh (Persian: قلعه, also Romanized as Qal‘eh; also known as Qal‘eh Gūkān and Qal‘eh-ye Gūkān) is a village in Rahgan Rural District, in Rahgan District of Khafr County, Fars province, Iran.

At the 2006 census, its population was 364 people, when it was in Khafr District of Jahrom County. The 2016 census measured the population of the city as 345 people in 106 households.

In 2019, the district was separated from the county in the establishment of Khafr County, and it was transferred to the new Rahgan District.
