= Ab Katan =

Village in Iran

Ab Katan آب كتان
- Village
- Location within Iran
- Coordinates: 28°50′22″N 53°11′16″E
- Country: Iran
- Province: Fars
- County: Khafr
- Bakhsh: Rahgan
- Rural District: Rahgan

Population (2016)
  - Total: 98
- Time zone: UTC+3:30 (IRST)

Ab Katan (Persian: آب كتان, also Romanized as Āb Katān) is a village in Rahgan Rural District, in Rahgan District of Khafr County, Fars province, Iran.

At the 2006 census, its population was 84, in 18 families, when it was in Khafr District of Jahrom County. The 2016 census measured the population of the city as 98 people in 31 households.

In 2019, the district was separated from the county in the establishment of Khafr County, and Kharavan was transferred to the new Rahgan District.
