= Seh Talan, Jahrom =

Seh Talan سه تلان
- Village
- Location within Iran
- Coordinates: 28°48′41″N 53°16′19″E
- Country: Iran
- Province: Fars
- County: Khafr
- Bakhsh: Rahgan
- Rural District: North Rahgan

Population (2016)
  - Total: 13
- Time zone: UTC+3:30 (IRST)

Seh Talan (Persian: سه تلان, also Romanized as Seh Talān) is a village in Rahgan-e Shomali Rural District, Rahgan District, in Khafr County of Fars province, Iran.

At the 2006 census, its population was 21, in 5 families, when it was in Rahgan Rural District, in Khafr District of Jahrom County.The 2016 census measured the population of the village as 13 people in 6 households.

In 2019, the district was separated from the county in the establishment of Khafr County, and Rahgan Rural District was transferred to the new Rahgan District. Gorizan was transferred to Rahgan-e Shomali Rural District created in the district.
