= Zarjan =

Village in Fars province, Iran

Zarjan Persian: زرجان
- Village
- Location within Iran
- Coordinates: 28°56′18″N 53°12′46″E
- Country: Iran
- Province: Fars
- County: Khafr
- District: Central
- Rural District: Khafr

Population (2016)
  - Total: 1,400
- Time zone: UTC+3:30 (IRST)

Zarjan (Persian: زرجان) (Note: Also romanized as Zarjān; also known as Zarjūn and Zarqūn) is a village in, and the capital of, Khafr Rural District of the Central District of Khafr County, Fars province, Iran. The rural district was previously administered from the city of Bab Anar.

== Demographics ==
=== Population ===
At the time of the 2006 National Census, the village's population was 1,224 in 273 households, when it was in the former Khafr District of Jahrom County. The following census in 2011 counted 1,303 people in 361 households. The 2016 census measured the population of the village as 1,400 people in 416 households. It was the most populous village in its rural district.

In 2019, the district was separated from the county in the establishment of Khafr County, the rural district was transferred to the new Central District.
