= Tadavan =

Village in Fars province, Iran

Tadavan Persian: تادوان
- Village
- Location within Iran
- Coordinates: 28°49′45″N 53°19′31″E
- Country: Iran
- Province: Fars
- County: Khafr
- District: Rahgan
- Rural District: Rahgan-e Shomali

Population (2016)
  - Total: 1,013
- Time zone: UTC+3:30 (IRST)

Tadavan (Persian: تادوان) (Note: Also romanized as Tādavān; also known as Mādavān, Mādevān, and Taduwān) is a village in, and the capital of, Rahgan-e Shomali Rural District of Rahgan District, Khafr County, Fars province, Iran. It was the capital of Rahgan Rural District until its capital was transferred to the village of Bagh-e Kabir.

== Demographics ==
=== Population ===
At the time of the 2006 National Census, the village's population was 1,007 in 280 households, when it was in Rahgan Rural District of the former Khafr District of Jahrom County. The following census in 2011 counted 988 people in 314 households. The 2016 census measured the population of the village as 1,013 people in 344 households.

In 2019, the district was separated from the county in the establishment of Khafr County, and Rahgan Rural District was transferred to the new Rahgan District. Tadavan was transferred to Rahgan-e Shomali Rural District created in the district.
