= Ab-e Sard =

Absard is a city in Tehran Province, Iran.

Ab-e Sard or Ab-i-Sard or Absard (Persian: اب سرد) may also refer to:

- Absard, Fars
- Ab-e Sard, Kohgiluyeh and Boyer-Ahmad
- Ab-e Sard, Lorestan
