= Gunak =

Gunak (Persian: گونك) may refer to:

- Gunak, Fars
- Gunak, Irandegan, Khash County, Sistan and Baluchestan Province
- Gunak, Eskelabad, Khash County, Sistan and Baluchestan Province
