= Ab Sardan =

Ab Sardan (Persian: اب سردان) may refer to:

- Ab Sardan-e Olya Jowkar
- Ab Sardan-e Sofla Jowkar
- Ab Sardan-e Tal Deraz
