= Qaleyni =

Village in Fars province, Iran

Qaleyni Persian: قاليني
- Village
- Location within Iran
- Coordinates: 28°46′49″N 53°12′49″E
- Country: Iran
- Province: Fars
- County: Khafr
- District: Rahgan
- Rural District: Rahgan

Population (2016)
  - Total: 1,160
- Time zone: UTC+3:30 (IRST)

Qaleyni (Persian: قاليني) (Note: Also romanized as Qāleynī and Qālīnī; also known as Fālīnī and Qāleynī-ye ‘Olyā) is a village in Rahgan Rural District of Rahgan District, Khafr County, Fars province, Iran.

== Demographics ==
=== Population ===
At the time of the 2006 National Census, the village's population was 1,152 in 289 households, when it was in the former Khafr District of Jahrom County. The following census in 2011 counted 1,060 people in 327 households. The 2016 census measured the population of the village as 1,160 people in 392 households. It was the most populous village in its rural district.

In 2019, the district was separated from the county in the establishment of Khafr County, and the rural district was transferred to the new Rahgan District.
