= Shahr-e Khafr =

Shahr-e Khafr شهرخفر، شهر خفره
- Village
- Location within Iran
- Coordinates: 28°58′22″N 53°12′12″E
- Country: Iran
- Province: Fars
- County: Khafr
- Bakhsh: Central
- Rural District: Khafr

Population (2006)
  - Total: 2,501
- Time zone: UTC+3:30 (IRST)

Shahr-e Khafr (Persian: شهرخفر, also Romanized as Shahr Khafr; also known as Shahr-e Khafreh and Shahr-e Kheẕr) is a suburb of Bab Anar city and a village in Khafr Rural District of Khafr County, (formerly Khafr District of Jahrom County) in Fars province, Iran. At the 2016 census, its population was 43, in 13 families. as most of the village was incorporated into Bab Anar urban area. In 2006, it had 2,501 people.
