= Bagh-e Kabir =

Village in Fars province, Iran

Bagh-e Kabir Persian: باغ كبير
- Village
- Location within Iran
- Coordinates: 28°50′05″N 53°10′21″E
- Country: Iran
- Province: Fars
- County: Khafr
- District: Rahgan
- Rural District: Rahgan

Population (2016)
  - Total: 1,121
- Time zone: UTC+3:30 (IRST)

Bagh-e Kabir (Persian: باغ كبير) (Note: Also romanized as Bāgh-e Kabīr and Bāgh-i-Kabīr) is a village in, and the capital of, Rahgan Rural District of Rahgan District, Khafr County, Fars province, Iran. The previous capital of the rural district was the village of Tadavan.

== Demographics ==
=== Population ===
At the time of the 2006 National Census, the village's population was 895 in 219 households, when it was in the former Khafr District of Jahrom County. The following census in 2011 counted 1,038 people in 297 households. The 2016 census measured the population of the village as 1,121 people in 350 households.

In 2019, the district was separated from the county in the establishment of Khafr County, and the rural district was transferred to the new Rahgan District.
