= Murdak =

Murdak or Moordak (Persian: موردك) may refer to:

- Moordak, Jahrom
- Murdak, Jahrom
- Murdak, Kazerun
