= Abadeh (disambiguation) =

Abadeh is a city in Fars Province, Iran.

Abadeh (Persian: اباده) may also refer to:

- Abadeh, Bavanat, Fars Province
- Abadeh, Jahrom, Fars Province
- Abadeh, Kavar, Fars Province
- Abadeh, Marvdasht, Fars Province
- Abadeh, Kohgiluyeh and Boyer-Ahmad
- Abadeh, Mazandaran
- Abadeh County, in Fars Province
