= Khafr =

Khafr (Persian: خفر) may refer to these places in Iran:

- Khafr, Fars
- Khafr, Natanz, Isfahan Province
- Khafr, Semirom, Isfahan Province
- Khafr District, in Fars Province
- Khafr Rural District, in Fars Province

== See also ==
- Khafre, ancient Egyptian pharaoh
