= Bala Shahr, Jahrom =

Bala Shahr بالاشهر
- Village
- Location within Iran
- Coordinates: 28°57′58″N 53°09′25″E
- Country: Iran
- Province: Fars
- County: Khafr
- Bakhsh: Central
- Rural District: Khafr

Population (2016)
  - Total: 625
- Time zone: UTC+3:30 (IRST)

Bala Shahr (Persian: بالاشهر, also Romanized as Bālā Shahr) is a village in Khafr Rural District of Khafr County,(formerly in Jahrom County) Fars province, Iran. At the 2006 census, its population was 680, in 177 families. In 2016, it had 625 people in 189 households.
