= Eshkowri =

Eshkowri اشكوری
- Village
- Location within Iran
- Coordinates: 29°02′21″N 52°51′59″E
- Country: Iran
- Province: Fars
- County: Khafr
- Bakhsh: Central
- Rural District: Sefidar

Population (2016)
  - Total: 237
- Time zone: UTC+3:30 (IRST)

Eshkowri (Persian: اشکوری, also Romanized as Eshkowrī, Eshkoori, and Oshkūrī) is a village in Sefidar Rural District, of Khafr County (formerly Khafr District of Jahrom County) in Fars province, Iran. At the 2016 census, its population was 237, in 73 families.
