= Jezeh, Fars =

Jezeh جزه
- Neighborhood
- Location within Iran
- Coordinates: 28°57′21″N 53°12′57″E
- Country: Iran
- Province: Fars
- County: Khafr
- Bakhsh: Central
- City: Bab Anar

Population (2006)
  - Total: 1,620
- Time zone: UTC+3:30 (IRST)

Jezeh (Persian: جزه, also Romanized as Jazeh and Jezzeh) is a neighborhood in the city of Bab Anar in Khafr County, Fars province, Iran.

It was formerly a village in Khafr Rural District of Jahrom County. At the 2006 census, its population was 1,620, in 447 families. It was incorporated to Bab Anar's urban area by the time of the 2016 census.

== See also ==
- List of cities, towns and villages in Fars province
