= Fathabad, Khafr =

Fathabad فتح آباد
- Village
- Location within Iran
- Coordinates: 28°49′02″N 53°20′10″E
- Country: Iran
- Province: Fars
- County: Khafr
- Bakhsh: Rahgan
- Rural District: Rahgan

Population (2016)
  - Total: 827
- Time zone: UTC+3:30 (IRST)

Fathabad (Persian: فتح آباد, also Romanized as Fatḩābād) is a village in Rahgan-e Shomali Rural District, Rahgan District, Khafr County, Fars province, Iran. At the 2016 census, its population was 827, in 274 families.
