= Gel Berenji =

Village in Fars province, Iran

Gel Berenji Persian: گل برنجي
- Village
- Location within Iran
- Coordinates: 28°55′24″N 53°16′37″E
- Country: Iran
- Province: Fars
- County: Khafr
- District: Central
- Rural District: Gel Berenji

Population (2016)
  - Total: 1,679
- Time zone: UTC+3:30 (IRST)

Gel Berenji (Persian: گل برنجي) (Note: Also romanized as Gel Berenjī and Golberenjī) is a village in, and the capital of, Gel Berenji Rural District of the Central District of Khafr County, Fars province, Iran.

== Demographics ==
=== Population ===
At the time of the 2006 National Census, the village's population was 1,421 in 319 households, when it was in the former Khafr District of Jahrom County. The following census in 2011 counted 1,456 people in 405 households. The 2016 census measured the population of the village as 1,679 people in 511 households. It was the most populous village in its rural district.

In 2019, the district was separated from the county in the establishment of Khafr County, and the rural district was transferred to the new Central District.
