= Kereft =

Village in Fars province, Iran

Kereft Persian: كرفت
- Village
- Location within Iran
- Coordinates: 29°00′32″N 52°52′24″E
- Country: Iran
- Province: Fars
- County: Khafr
- District: Central
- Rural District: Sefidar

Population (2016)
  - Total: 1,390
- Time zone: UTC+3:30 (IRST)

Kereft (Persian: كرفت) is a village in Sefidar Rural District of the Central District of Khafr County, Fars province, Iran.

== Demographics ==
=== Population ===
At the time of the 2006 National Census, the village's population was 1,285 in 322 households, when it was in the former Khafr District of Jahrom County. The following census in 2011 counted 1,215 people in 334 households. The 2016 census measured the population of the village as 1,390 people in 434 households. It was the most populous village in its rural district.

In 2019, the district was separated from the county in the establishment of Khafr County, the rural district was transferred to the new Central District.
