= Aseman Gerd =

Aseman Gerd آسمانگرد، آسمانجرد
- Village
- Location within Iran
- Coordinates: 28°54′32″N 53°18′12″E
- Country: Iran
- Province: Fars
- County: Khafr
- Bakhsh: Central
- Rural District: Gel Berenji

Population (2016)
  - Total: 1,029
- Time zone: UTC+3:30 (IRST)

Aseman Gerd (Persian: اسمانگرد, also Romanized as Āsemān Gerd; also known as Āsemān Jerd and Asmāngird) is a village in Gel Berenji Rural District of Khafr County in Fars province, Iran.

At the 2006 census, its population was 1,007, in 254 families, when it was in Khafr District of Jahrom County. The 2016 census measured the population of the village as 1,029 people in 324 households.

In 2019, the district was separated from the county in the establishment of Khafr County, and the rural district was transferred to the new Central District.
