= Murchagi =

Murchagi مورچگی
- Village
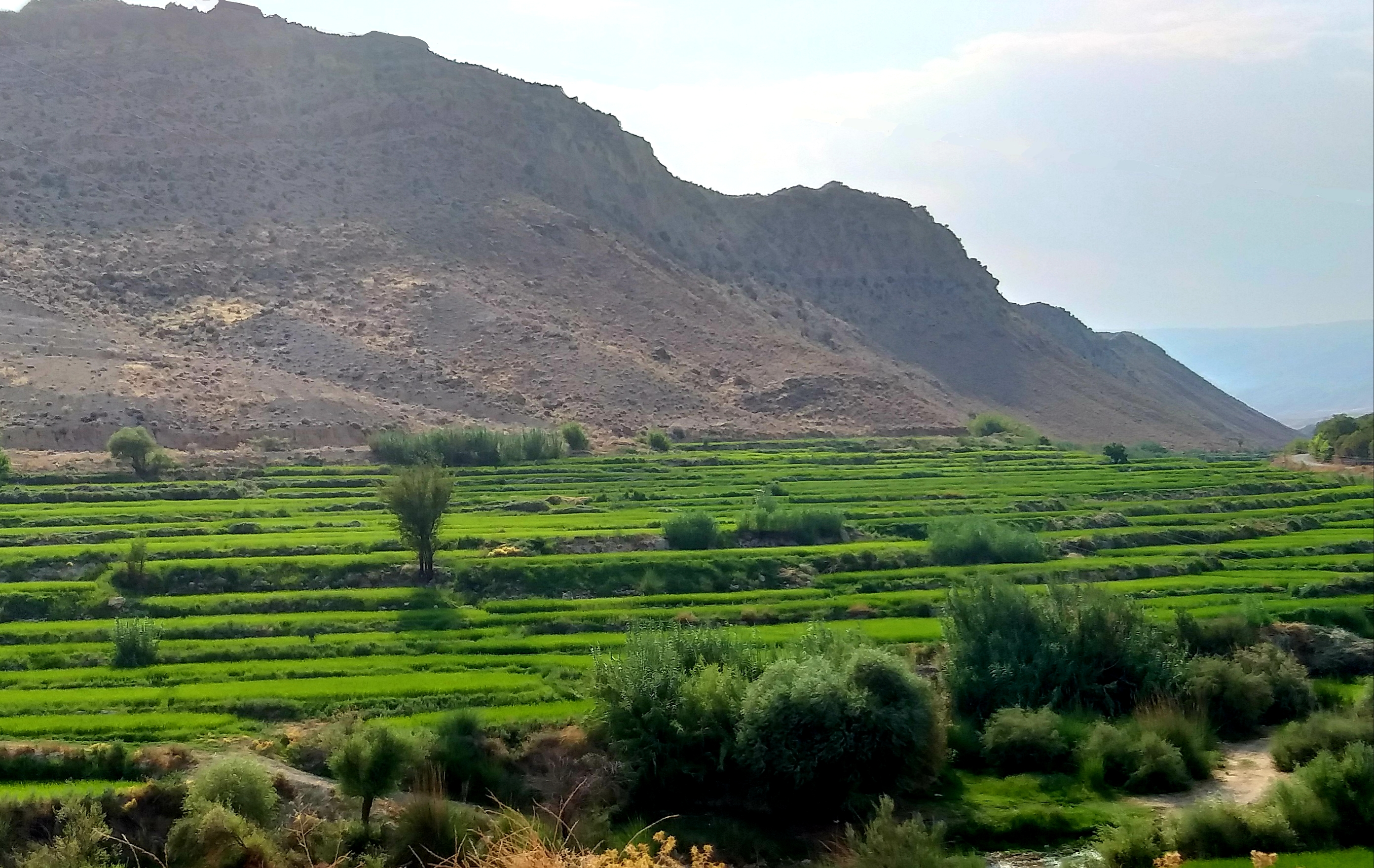

- Location within Iran
- Coordinates: 28°50′57″N 53°09′46″E
- Country: Iran
- Province: Fars
- County: Khafr
- Bakhsh: Rahgan
- Rural District: Rahgan

Population (2016)
  - Total: 303
- Time zone: UTC+3:30 (IRST)

Murchagi (Persian: مورچگی, also Romanized as Mūrchagī; also known as Moordak and Mūrjakī) is a village in Rahgan Rural District, in Rahgan District of Khafr County, Fars province, Iran.

At the 2006 census, its population was 328 people, when it was in Khafr District of Jahrom County. The 2016 census measured the population of the city as 303 people in 87 households.

In 2019, the district was separated from the county in the establishment of Khafr County, and it was transferred to the new Rahgan District.
