= Seh Tolan =

Seh Tolan or Seh Talan or Sehtolan (Persian: سه تلان) may refer to:

- Seh Talan, Jahrom
- Sehtolan, Kazerun
- Seh Talan, Rostam
- Seh Tolan, Sepidan
