= Tangeh Narreh =

Tangeh Narreh تنگه نره
- Village
- Location within Iran
- Coordinates: 29°02′52″N 53°06′31″E
- Country: Iran
- Province: Fars
- County: Khafr
- Bakhsh: Central
- Rural District: Aliabad

Population (2006)
  - Total: 14
- Time zone: UTC+3:30 (IRST)

Tangeh Narreh (Persian: تنگه نره; also known as Tang Narreh) is a village in Aliabad Rural District of Khafr County, Fars province, Iran.

At the 2006 census, its population was 14, in 7 families, when it was in Khafr District, Jahrom County. At the 2016 census the village had no household population.

In 2019, the district was separated from the county in the establishment of Khafr County, and the rural district was transferred to the new Central District.
