= Esmailabad, Khafr =

Village in Fars province, Iran

Esmailabad Persian: اسماعيل آباد
- Village
- Location within Iran
- Coordinates: 29°01′45″N 52°56′40″E
- Country: Iran
- Province: Fars
- County: Khafr
- District: Central
- Rural District: Sefidar

Population (2016)
  - Total: 165
- Time zone: UTC+3:30 (IRST)

Esmailabad (Persian: اسماعيل آباد) (Note: Also romanized as Esmā‘īlābād and Ismā‘īlābād; also known as Esmā‘īlābād-e Korbāl) is a village in, and the capital of, Sefidar Rural District of the Central District of Khafr County, Fars province, Iran.

== Demographics ==
=== Population ===
At the time of the 2006 National Census, the village's population was 377 in 112 households, when it was in the former Khafr District of Jahrom County. The following census in 2011 counted 192 people in 69 households. The 2016 census measured the population of the village as 165 people in 67 households.

In 2019, the district was separated from the county in the establishment of Khafr County, and the rural district was transferred to the new Central District.
