= Gharbi =

Gharbi, meaning western, may refer to:

== Places ==
- Gharbi, Afghanistan, village in Afghanistan
- Gharbi, Iran, village in Iran
- Gharbi, Tunisia, south island off the Tunisian coast
- Gharbi Rural District, in Ardabil Province, Iran
- Hodh El Gharbi Region, Mauritania
- Mangowal Gharbi, village in Punjab, Pakistan

== People ==
- Ismaël Gharbi, French footballer
- Marc Lépine (born Gamil Rodrigue Liass Gharbi; 1964–1989), Canadian mass murderer; perpetrator of the École Polytechnique massacre
- Seer Gharbi, Union Council in NWFP, Pakistan

== See also ==
- Al Gharbiyah (disambiguation)
- Western (disambiguation)
