= List of universities in Fars Province =

Fars province (Persian: استان فارس Ostān-e Fārs pronounced [fɑː(r)s]), is one of the provinces of Iran. The Fars province is in the south of the Iran and its capital city is Shiraz.

- Shiraz University
- Shiraz University of Medical Sciences
- Shiraz University of Technology
- Islamic Azad University of Shiraz
- Jahrom University
- Jahrom University of Medical Sciences
- Islamic Azad University of Jahrom
- Payam Noor University of Shiraz
- Payam Noor University of Jahrom
- Shiraz University of Applied Science and Technology
- Shahid Bahonar College of Technology and Engineering of Shiraz
- Hafez Institute of Higher Education
- Zand Institute of Higher Education
- Honar Institute of Higher Education
- Earm Institute of Higher Education
- Pasargad Institute of Higher Education
- Fasa University of Medical Sciences
- Fasa University
- Islamic Azad University, Fars Science and Research Branch
- Islamic Azad University of Abadeh
- Islamic Azad University of Arsanjan
- Islamic Azad University of Beiza
- Islamic Azad University of Darab
- Islamic Azad University of Eghlid
- Islamic Azad University of Sepidan
- Islamic Azad University of Fasa
- Islamic Azad University of Firouzabad
- Islamic Azad University of Estahban
- Islamic Azad University of Eghlid
- Islamic Azad University of Kazerun
- Islamic Azad University of Larestan
- Islamic Azad University of Lamerd
- Islamic Azad University of Eghlid
- Islamic Azad University of Marvdasht
- Islamic Azad University of Neyriz
- Islamic Azad University of Abadeh Tashk
- Islamic Azad University of Mamasani ( Noorabad )
- Islamic Azad University of Mohr
- Islamic Azad University of Daryoon
- Islamic Azad University of Farashband
- Islamic Azad University of Evaz
- Islamic Azad University of Safa Shahr
- Islamic Azad University of Sarvestan
- Islamic Azad University of Gerash
- Islamic Azad University of Khafr
- Islamic Azad University of Khonj
- Islamic Azad University of Kavar
- Islamic Azad University of Kherameh
- Islamic Azad University of Pasargod
- Islamic Azad University of Zarghan
- Islamic Azad University of Zarrindasht

== See also ==
- List of universities in Iran
- Fars province
- List of Iranian Medical Schools
- List of Universities in Tehran Province
  - List of colleges and universities in Tehran
- List of Iranian Research Centers
- List of colleges and universities by country
- List of colleges and universities
- Higher education in Iran
