= Aliabad, Khafr =

Village in Fars province, Iran

Aliabad Persian: علي اباد
- Village
- Location within Iran
- Coordinates: 29°00′18″N 53°05′23″E
- Country: Iran
- Province: Fars
- County: Khafr
- District: Central
- Rural District: Aliabad

Population (2016)
  - Total: 1,477
- Time zone: UTC+3:30 (IRST)

Aliabad (Persian: علي اباد) (Note: Also romanized as ‘Alīābād and Alīābād) is a village in, and the capital of, Aliabad Rural District of the Central District of Khafr County, Fars province, Iran.

== Demographics ==
=== Population ===
At the time of the 2006 National Census, the village's population was 1,887 in 448 households, when it was in the former Khafr District of Jahrom County. The following census in 2011 counted 1,610 people in 478 households. The 2016 census measured the population of the village as 1,477 people in 467 households. It was the most populous village in its rural district.

In 2019, the district was separated from the county in the establishment of Khafr County, and the rural district was transferred to the new Central District.
