= Shaghun, Khafr =

Shaghun هاغون، شاغون
- Village
- Location within Iran
- Coordinates: 29°01′36″N 52°51′10″E
- Country: Iran
- Province: Fars
- County: Khafr County
- Bakhsh: Central
- Rural District: Sefidar

Population (2016)
  - Total: 366
- Time zone: UTC+3:30 (IRST)

Shaghun (Persian: شاغون, also Romanized as Shāghūn; also known as Shāh Khūn and Shākhvon), also known as Hahgun is a village in Sefidar Rural District of Khafr County in Fars province, Iran.

At the 2006 census, its population was 249, in 66 families, when it was in Khafr District of Jahrom County. The 2016 census measured the population of the village as 366 people in 110 households.

In 2019, the district was separated from the county in the establishment of Khafr County, and the rural district was transferred to the new Central District.
