= Absard, Fars =

Absard آبسرد
- Village
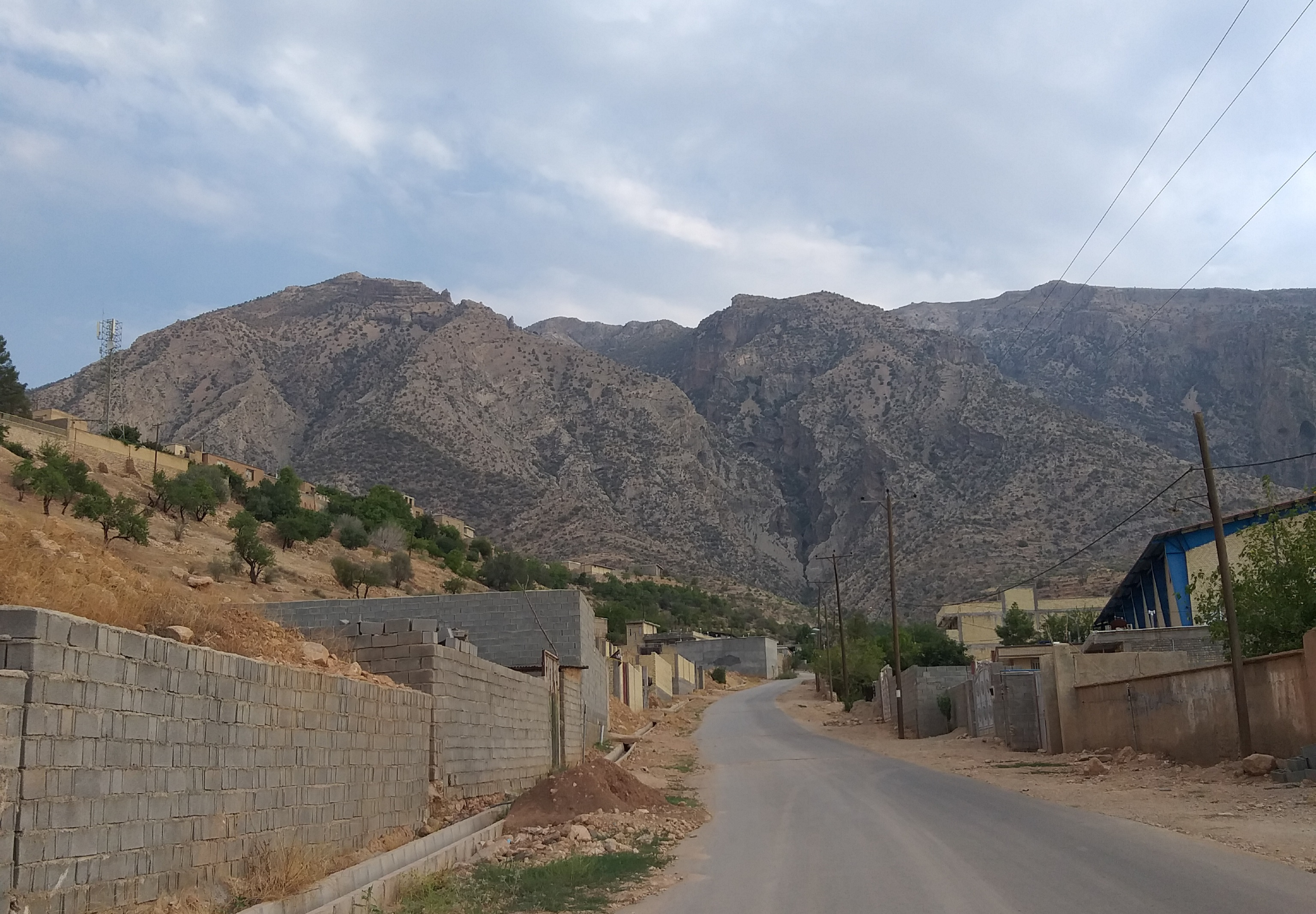

- Location within Iran
- Coordinates: 28°58′27″N 52°56′06″E
- Country: Iran
- Province: Fars
- County: Khafr
- Bakhsh: Central
- Rural District: Sefidar

Population (2016)
  - Total: 1,210
- Time zone: UTC+3:30 (IRST)

Absard (Persian: آبسرد, also Romanized as Ābsard) is a village in Sefidar Rural District, Khafr County, Fars province, Iran. At the 2006 census, its population was 1,253, in 353 families, when it was in Khafr District of Jahrom County. The 2016 census measured the population as 1,210 in 424 households.

In 2019, the district was separated from the county in the establishment of Khafr County, and the rural district was transferred to the new Central District.
