= Abedabad =

Abedabad عابدآباد
- Village
- Location within Iran
- Coordinates: 29°01′20″N 52°58′00″E
- Country: Iran
- Province: Fars
- County: Khafr
- Bakhsh: Central
- Rural District: Sefidar

Population (2016)
  - Total: 227
- Time zone: UTC+3:30 (IRST)

Abedabad (Persian: عابدآباد, also Romanized as 'Ābedābād and 'Abdābād) is a village in Sefidar Rural District, Khafr County, Fars province, Iran.

At the 2006 census, its population was 270, in 79 families, when it was in Khafr District of Jahrom County. The 2016 census measured the population as 227 in 78 households.

In 2019, the district was separated from the county in the establishment of Khafr County, and the rural district was transferred to the new Central District.
