= Abdabad =

Abdabad (Persian: عبداباد) may refer to:

- Abdabad, Fars
- Abdabad, Kerman
- Abdabad, Khuzestan
- Abdabad, North Khorasan
- Abdabad, Razavi Khorasan
