= Dormeh =

Dormeh or Dermeh (Persian: درمه) may refer to:

- Dermeh, Fars
- Dormeh, Kurdistan
