= Rahgan =

Rahgan راهگان
- Village
- Location within Iran
- Coordinates: 28°51′15″N 53°09′14″E
- Country: Iran
- Province: Fars
- County: Khafr
- Bakhsh: Rahgan
- Rural District: Rahgan

Population (2016)
  - Total: 300
- Time zone: UTC+3:30 (IRST)

Rahgan (Persian: راهگان, also Romanized as Rāhgān; also known as Rāhakān and Rāhkān) is a village in Rahgan Rural District, Rahgan District, Khafr County, Fars province, Iran. At the 2016 census, its population was 300, in 89 families.
