= Tahina (disambiguation) =

Tahina or Tahini is a condiment made from sesame.

Tahina may also refer to:

- Tahina, Iran, a village in Iran also known as Tahuneh, Jahrom, Iran
- Tahina spectabilis, species of gigantic palm tree found in northeastern Madagascar
- Tahina Razafindramary, educationist and teacher from Madagascar

== See also ==
- Tajine, a North African dish
