= Rahkan =

Rahkan (Persian: راهكان) may refer to:

- Rahkan, Jahrom
- Rahkan, Qir and Karzin
