= Malavan, Fars =

Malavan ملوان
- Village
- Location within Iran
- Coordinates: 28°58′54″N 53°04′11″E
- Country: Iran
- Province: Fars
- County: Khafr
- Bakhsh: Central
- Rural District: Aliabad

Population (2016)
  - Total: 176
- Time zone: UTC+3:30 (IRST)

Malavan (Persian: ملوان, also Romanized as Malavān and Malvān) is a village in Aliabad Rural District of Khafr County, Fars province, Iran.

At the 2006 census, its population was 174, in 49 families, when it was in Khafr District, Jahrom County. The 2016 census measured the population of the village as 176 people in 64 households.

In 2019, the district was separated from the county in the establishment of Khafr County, and the rural district was transferred to the new Central District.
