= Saghadeh =

Saghadeh صغاده، صغاد
- Village
- Location within Iran
- Coordinates: 28°56′44″N 53°12′00″E
- Country: Iran
- Province: Fars
- County: Khafr
- Bakhsh: Central
- Rural District: Khafr

Population (2016)
  - Total: 867
- Time zone: UTC+3:30 (IRST)

Saghadeh (Persian: صغاده, also Romanized as Şaghādeh and Şoghādeh; also known as Chagādeh, Seqādeh, Şoghād, and Sugādeh) is a village in Khafr Rural District of Khafr County, (formerly in Jahrom County) Fars province, Iran. At the 2016 census, its population was 867, in 282 families. Up from 816 in 2006.
