= Galleh Dari Hajj Morady =

Galleh Dari Hajj Morady گله داري حاج مرادئ
- Village
- Country: Iran
- Province: Fars
- County: Jahrom
- Bakhsh: Khafr
- Rural District: Sefidar

Population (2006)
  - Total: 20
- Time zone: UTC+3:30 (IRST)
  - Summer (DST): UTC+4:30 (IRDT)

Galleh Dari Hajj Morady (Persian: گله داري حاج مرادئ, also Romanized as Galleh Dārī Ḩājj Morādy) is a village in Sefidar Rural District, Khafr District, Jahrom County, Fars province, Iran. At the 2006 census, its population was 20, in 5 families.
