= Malavan, Iran =

Malavan (Persian: مالوان or ملوان) in Iran may refer to:

- Malavan, Fars (ملوان - Malavān)
- Malavan, Gilan (مالوان - Mālavān)
