= Jezeh =

Jezeh or Jazeh or Jezzeh (Persian: جزه) may refer to:

- Jezzeh, Fars
- Jezeh, Isfahan
- Jazeh, Kashan, Isfahan Province
