= Khonak =

Khonak خنک
- Village
- Location within Iran
- Coordinates: 29°03′09″N 52°54′55″E
- Country: Iran
- Province: Fars
- County: Khafr
- Bakhsh: Central
- Rural District: Sefidar

Population (2016)
  - Total: 183
- Time zone: UTC+3:30 (IRST)

Khonak (Persian: خنک, also romanized as Khonok; also known as Gunak and Jonak) is a village in Sefidar Rural District of Khafr County, (formerly in Jahrom County) in Fars province, Iran.

At the 2006 census, its population was 285, in 64 families. The 2016 census measured the population as 183 in 71 households.

In 2019, the district was separated from the county in the establishment of Khafr County, and the rural district was transferred to the new Central District.
