= Shaghun =

Shaghun (Persian: شاغون) may refer to:

- Shaghun, Khafr
- Shaghun, Simakan
