= Rayehe Mozafarian =

Iranian activist

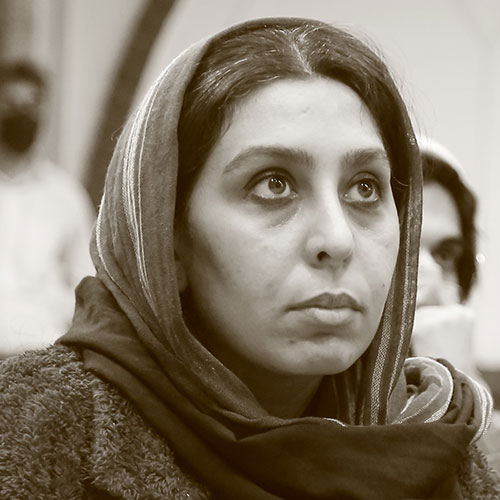
- Born: 1986 (age 39–40); Shiraz, Iran
- Education: Anadolu University (Ph.D. in Sociology); Islamic Azad University, Shiraz Branch (BEng); Shiraz University (MD)
- Occupations: Activist; author; documentary filmmaker
- Years active: 2008–present
- Partner: Hadi Ahmadi
- Children: 1
- Website: https://rayehe.org

Rayehe Mozafarian (Persian: رایحه مظفریان, born 1986) is an Iranian women and children rights activist, author, and documentary filmmaker. The founder of Stop FGM Iran group and Woman and Zoorkhaneh campaign, she is best known for her research and raising awareness about female genital mutilation in Iran and challenging the country's Zoorkhaneh Sports Federation to unban women from participating in Iranian's ancient sport pahlevani and zoorkhaneh rituals.

Mozafarian has written several books, most notably Razor and Tradition, which analyzes the different aspects of female circumcision, and The Ring: A Look at Child Marriage in Iran which focuses on child marriage in Iran and the causes of the issue. She has also directed and produced multiple documentary films. Her 2022 documentary about Usher syndrome, The Creation, earned her a nomination at the Sixth Annual Documentary TV Awards in Iran.

== Life and career ==
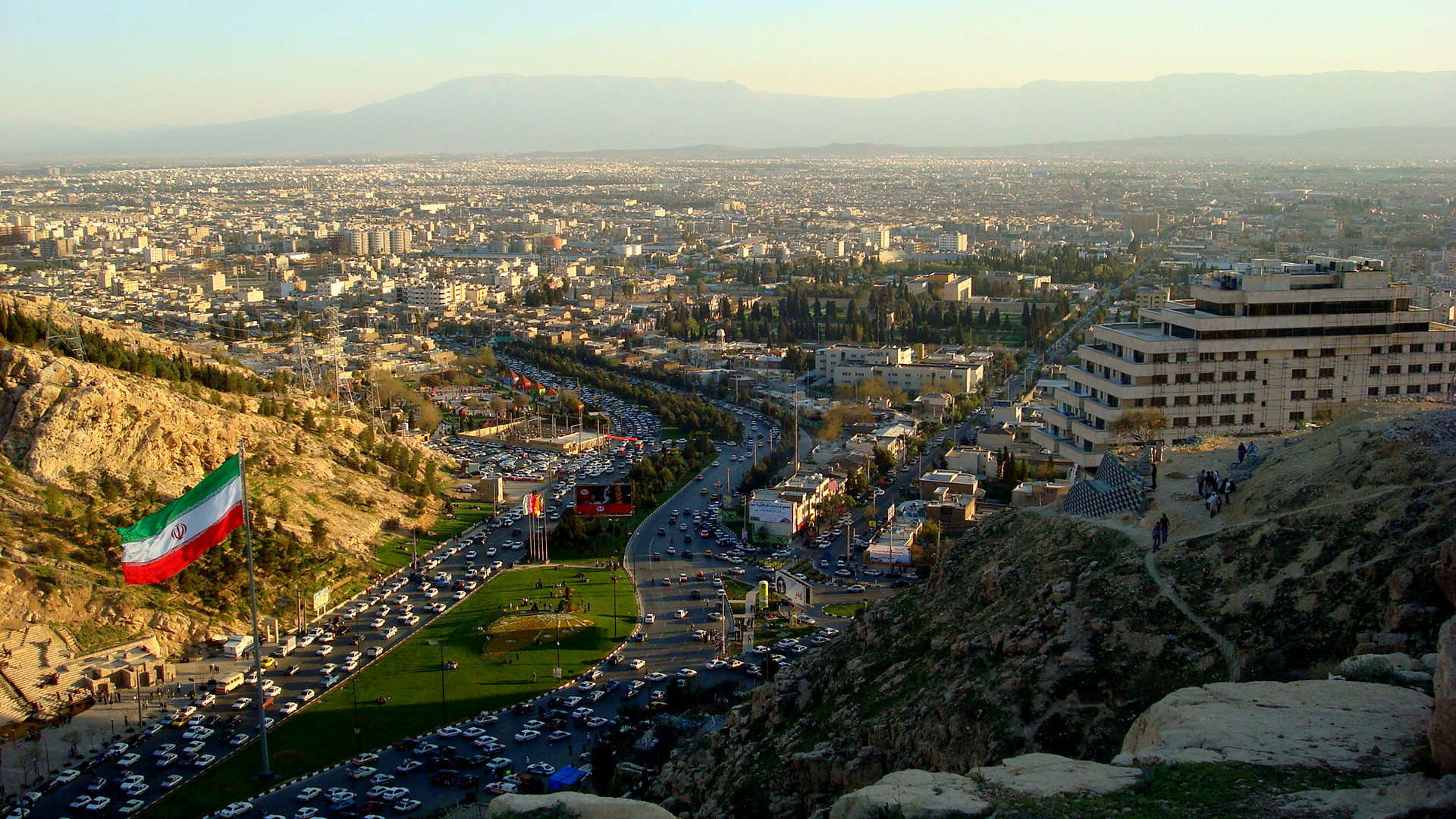
Mozafarian was born in Shiraz.

Rayehe Mozafarian was born in 1986 in Shiraz, Iran. After earning a degree in architectural engineering in 2008 from the Islamic Azad University, Shiraz Branch, she continued her education and graduated in 2011 from Shiraz University with a degree in Sociology of population and development.

Following her studies and researches about female genital mutilation, specifically in Qeshm Island, Mozafarian started writing her first book, تیغ و سنت (transl. Razor and Tradition). The first edition of the book was published by Roshangarn in 2013. The book features seven chapters, analyzing the different aspects of female circumcision, including its scientific and medical aspects, as well as its psychological, individual and social complications and consequences. Another notable book written Mozafarian, حلقه، نگاهی به ازدواج کودکان در ایران (transl. The Ring: A Look at Child Marriage in Iran), was published in 2016. It focuses on child marriage in Iran and the causes of the issue. In 2021, she published another book in this field, titled گره: ازدواج زودهنگام در ایران (transl. The Knot: Early marriage in Iran).

Mozafarian has also directed and produced several documentary films in here career, including Ten Forty-one about child marriage, Red snapper about female genital mutilation, The Pit Edge about women presence in pahlevani and zoorkhaneh rituals, and The Creation about Usher syndrome. The Creation has been nominated for Semi-long Documentary at the Sixth Annual Documentary TV Awards in Iran.

== Activism ==
Mozafarian has researched about female genital mutilation (FGM) in Iran and is known as one of the most important activists to fight against the issue in the country. According to her researches, Qeshm Island has the highest rate of FGM in Iran, as 83% of women have undergone circumcision. Mozafarian also visited Shahindokht Molaverdi, the vice president for women and family affairs of Iran, warning about the existence of an extreme form of FGM, called infibulation in some parts of Khuzestan province. Although FGM in Iran occurs due to traditional beliefs and not the religion and Islamic laws, Mozafarian's researches and raising awareness led to a fatwa from Sunni Faqīhs against the female genital mutilation in October 2019. As a result, despite the absence of a specific program for women or children at risk or a specific law against FGM, the fatwa became "very effective in changing the process" on FGM. In 2015, Mozafarian founded Stop FGM Iran (Step by Step Towards Stopping Female Genital Mutilation in Iran) group, which is the first specialized forum to prevent the spread of this practice in Iran. In the same year, Mozafarian and activist Parvin Zabihi explained how FGM is related to religion and patriarchal society at the New York Festival International Radio Program Awards.

Mozafarian, who practices Iranian's ancient sport pahlevani and zoorkhaneh rituals by herself and is the first Iranian sportswoman in this field, also campaigns and works towards legally challenging Iran's Zoorkhaneh Sports Federation to unban women from participating in the sports' rituals, as it "has no religious standing". In 2020, a video of Mozafarian and her teammates practicing the sport went viral on the internet, which led condemnation from male athletes and religious groups, who believe "only men should be allowed to perform the ancient rituals". Aftab Yazd took an interview with Mozafarian objecting to the tollab who sit-down strike the federation, condemning women practicing the sport. Referring to the protesters who were saying "zoorkhaneh is a holy place and not a place for women", Mozafarian stated that "zoorkhaneh is not holier than the house of God and the mosque" and "women have never been prohibited from attending holy places". Former president of the Islamic Federation for Women's Sport in Iran Faezeh Hashemi Rafsanjani advised Mozafarian to consider using her platform on social media to stand against the ban: "What can be done is spreading the word on social media and talking about it, keeping it alive. You shouldn't let it die." Mozafarian also founded Woman and Zoorkhaneh campaign.

In addition to her efforts for women rights in Iran, Mozafarian is a children rights activist, raising awareness about child marriage and use of children in advertising in the country. Although Iran government has signed the Convention on the Rights of the Child, which consider all people under the age of 18 are children and according to this convention, marriage of children under the age of 18 is prohibited, child marriage exists in Iran. Mozafarian analyzes the reasons of the issue as forcing "a child to marry by ruling and determining expediency" because of the "economic and cultural poverty of families", as well as children tending to "get rid of chaotic family conditions such as addiction and poverty". Mozafarian also stated: "Some families force these minors to get married early in order to prevent their children from getting acquainted with sexual issues or from putting them in danger in premarital relationships."

== Books ==
The list is adapted from the Online public access catalog.

- Razor & Tradition (2013)
- The Glass Wall (2014)
- A Man Named Shiraz (2014)
- The Ring: A Look at Child Marriage in Iran (2016)
- A look at why female genital mutilation has stopped in Iran (2017)
- The Knot: Early marriage in Iran (2021)
- Ten, Forty-one: A Look at Child Marriage in Iran Based on History, Documents and Statistics (2022)

== Awards and nominations ==
Awards and nominations received by Rayehe Mozafarian
Award	Year	Nominated work	Category	Result	Ref.
Documentary TV Awards	2022	The Creation	Best Semi-long Documentary	Pending	

== See also ==
- Female genital mutilation
- List of Iranian women
- List of women's rights activists
- Women's rights in Iran
