= Jahrom University of Medical Sciences =

Coordinates: 28°30′48.81″N 53°36′44.06″E

- دانشگاه علوم پزشکی جهرم; Daneshgah-e Olum-e Pezeshki-ye Jahrom
- Type: Public
- Established: 1977
- President: Dr. Mohammad Rahmanian
- Location: Jahrom, Fars province, Iran
- Campus: Urban
- Colors: Tangerine and turquoise
- Website: www.jums.ac.ir

Jahrom University of Medical Sciences (JUMS) (Persian: دانشگاه علوم پزشکی جهرم Dāneshgāh-e Olum Pezeshki-e Jahrom) is a public medical university located in the city of Jahrom, Fars province, south of Iran. Jums was established in 1977 and currently is the second top medical university in the province. The university has three faculties, four hospitals and six research centres with more than 1200 students and 120 faculty staffs. This university has the most medical and healthcare facilities in Fars province after Shiraz University of Medical Sciences.

== History ==
The foundation of Jahrom university of medical sciences dates back to 1977 when Shiraz University of Medical Sciences established a medical school in Jahrom and admitted 40 medical students. Following the 1979 Islamic revolution of Iran the university suspended for almost 7 years and began its work again in 1986 by admitting 90 medical and 20 nursing students. 10 years later in 1996, the medical school of Jahrom dissented from Shiraz University of Medical Sciences and promoted to the independent "Jahrom school of medical sciences". The school promoted to "Jahrom university of medical sciences" in 2007.

Currently, the number of academic members at the University of Medical Sciences is 121. At present, over 1200 students of various disciplines and levels are studying in the university.

== Faculties and Research Centres ==
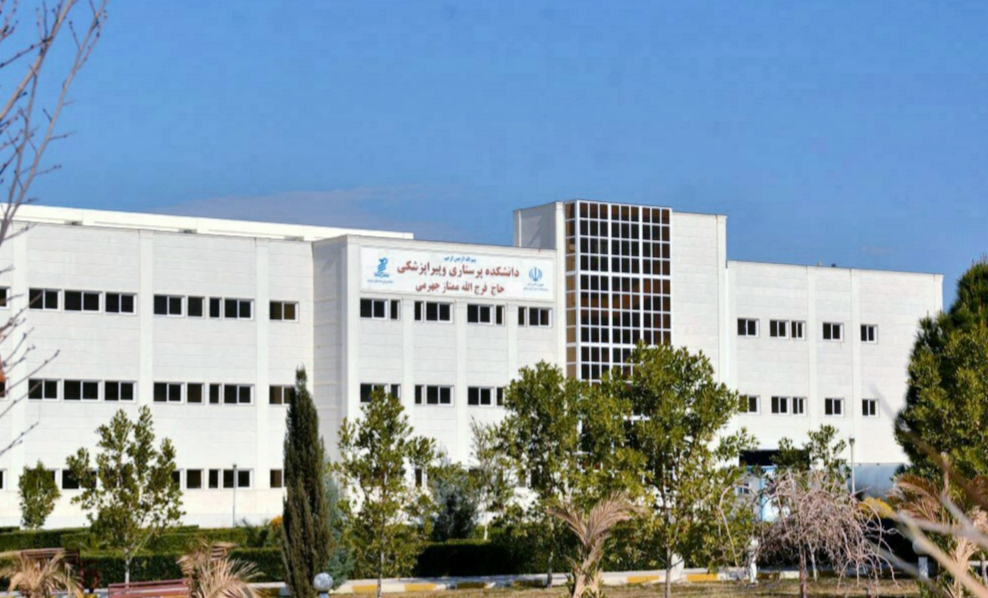
Jahrom Faculty of Nursing

The faculties Jahrom university of medical sciences include:

- Faculty of Medicine, 1977
- Faculty of Nursing & Midwifery, 1986
- Faculty of Para-medicine, 1987

There are six research centres in the university:

- Medical Ethics Research Centre
- Non-Communicable Diseases Research Centre
- Anaesthesiology and Pain Control Research Centre
- Women's Health and Diseases Research Centre
- Social Factors Affecting Health Research Centre
- Human-Animal Common Diseases Research Centre

== Hospitals ==
The university manages or supervises four hospitals including Seyyedoshohada, Ostad Motahhari, Peymanieh in Jahrom and Bab Anar Khatam-olanbia, as well as all urban and rural health centers and clinics in Jahrom and Khafr counties.

== See also ==
- Jahrom University
- Islamic Azad University, Jahrom Branch
