= Khavaran, Fars =

City in Fars province, Iran

Khavaran Persian: خاوران
- City
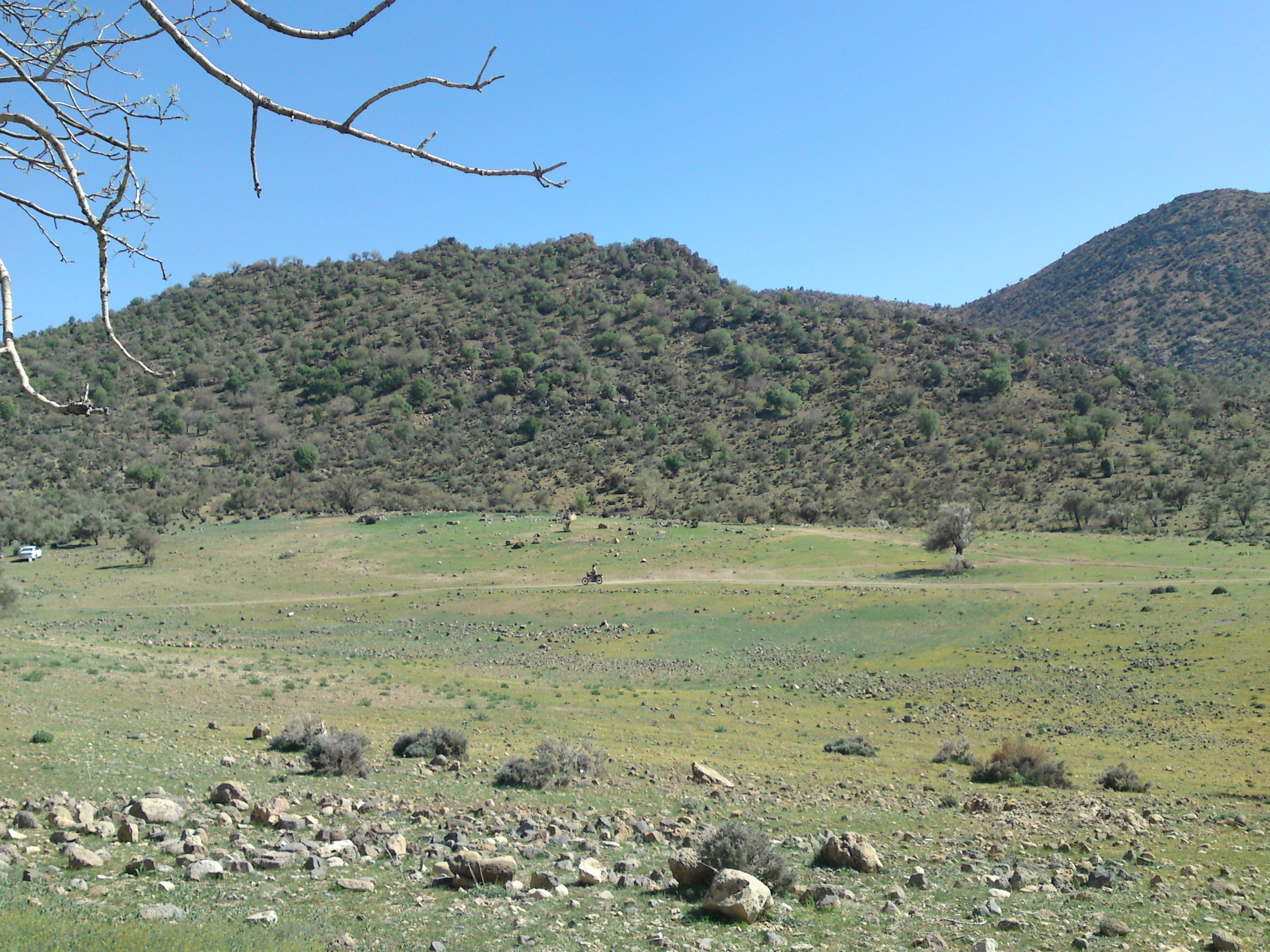
- Khavaran forest

- Location within Iran
- Coordinates: 28°56′15″N 53°18′51″E
- Country: Iran
- Province: Fars
- County: Khafr
- District: Rahgan

Population (2016)
  - Total: 4,332
- Time zone: UTC+3:30 (IRST)

Khavaran (Persian: خاوران) (Note: Formerly Khanegahdan (خانِگَهدان), also romanized as Khānegahdān; and Khanekahdan (خانه کَهدان), also romanized as Khaneh Kahdan, Khāneh Kāhdān, Khānehkohdān, Khāneh-ye Kahdān, Khānekahdān; also known as Khāneh-ye Kāhvān and Khānkahdān) is a city in, and the capital of, Rahgan District of Khafr County, Fars province, Iran.

== Demographics ==
=== Population ===
At the time of the 2006 National Census, the city's population was 5,137 in 1,303 households, when it was in the former Khafr District of Jahrom County. The following census in 2011 counted 4,075 people in 1,231 households. The 2016 census measured the population of the city as 4,332 people in 1,533 households.

In 2019, the district was separated from the county in the establishment of Khafr County, and Kharavan was transferred to the new Rahgan District.

== Notable people ==
- Fakhraddin Hashemi, Shia cleric
