= Islamic Azad University, Jahrom Branch =

Islamic University in Iran

Coordinates: 28°34′53.63″N 53°35′52.12″E

- دانشگاه آزاد اسلامی واحد جهرم
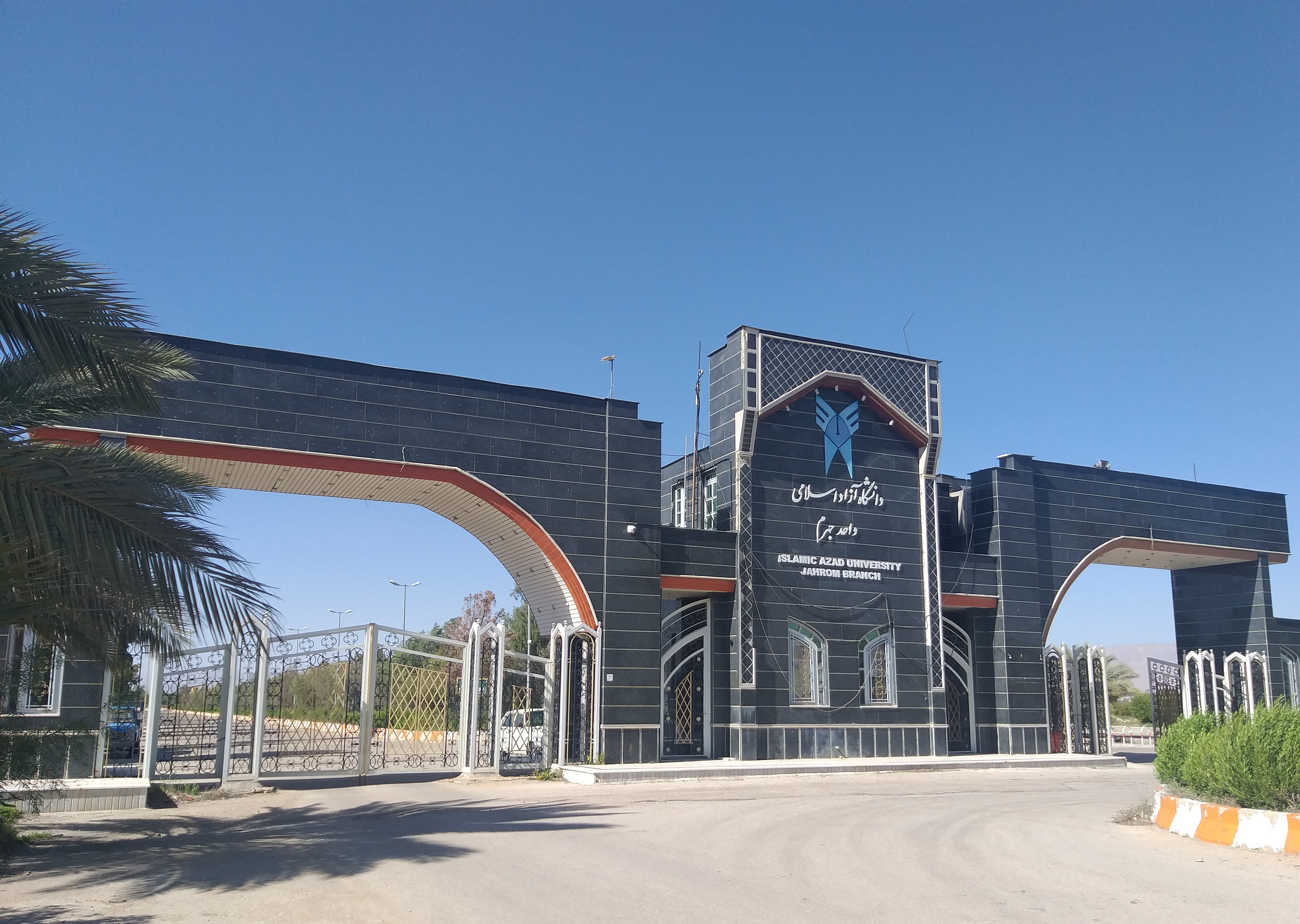
- Motto: "Iranian aspirations for globalization"
- Type: Private
- Established: 1988
- Faculty: ~ 100
- Students: ~ 3,000
- Location: Jahrom, Fars, Iran
- Campus: Urban
- Website: www.jia.ac.ir

The Islamic Azad University, Jahrom Branch (Persian: دانشگاه آزاد اسلامی واحد جهرم, romanized: Daneshgah-e Âzad-e Eslâmi-ye Vahed-e Jahrom) is a private university located in Jahrom, Iran. It is a part of private chain of universities in Iran called the Islamic Azad Universities. The university was established in 1988. Imam mehdi 462 acres campus of the university is in the north part of Jahrom. The university also has an observatory, technology growth center, 93 acres research garden and a library with 77.000 books.

The headquarters of the Islamic Azad University is in Tehran, Iran. The Islamic Azad University was founded in 1982 and currently has an enrollment of 1.7 million students, 30,000 Alumni and 35,000 Administrators. Over 3.5 million students have graduated from the Islamic Azad University since its establishment. The Islamic Azad University has a total area of 16 million square meters and over 440 branches across Iran and also in other countries around the world. It also has international branches and universities in the U.A.E, United Kingdom, Tanzania, Lebanon, Afghanistan and Armenia and has plans to establish more branch campuses in Malaysia, Canada, and Tajikistan in the near future.

The total area of the university is said to be 20 million square meters. Some 4 million students have graduated from this university to this date, which has made it possible for a lot of people to get access to higher educations and better employment prospects. In the recent years a lot of effort has been made to expand the graduate studies at the Islamic Azad University. The Islamic Azad University has about 200,000 master's degree students and about 20,000 PhD level students.

The Islamic Azad University also operates some 617 schools throughout the country, these schools are known as SAMA (Persian: سما).

The degrees and certificates issued by this university are recognized by the Ministry of Science and Higher Education. Post-graduate degrees have been offered in different branches of Islamic Azad University.

== History ==
The Islamic Azad University of Jahrom was established in 1988 with four bachelor's degree fields including Agriculture, Social Sciences, Sociology and Microbiology. The university currently has more than 3,000 students and 100 faculty members in 12 doctorate's, 40 Master's, 56 Bachelor's and 12 associate degrees.

== Faculties ==
- Faculty of Engineering
- Faculty of Nursing and Midwifery
- Faculty of Humanities
- Faculty of Agriculture
- Faculty of Basic Sciences

== See also ==
- List of universities in Iran
- List of Universities of Fars Province
- Higher education in Iran
- Jahrom University of Medical Sciences
- Jahrom University
