= Abadeh, Marvdasht =

Abadeh اباده
- Village
- Location within Iran
- Coordinates: 30°02′45″N 52°32′27″E
- Country: Iran
- Province: Fars
- County: Marvdasht
- Bakhsh: Dorudzan
- Rural District: Ramjerd-e Do

Population (2006)
  - Total: 283
- Time zone: UTC+3:30 (IRST)
  - Summer (DST): UTC+4:30 (IRDT)

Abadeh (Persian: اباده, also Romanized as Ābādeh) is a village in Ramjerd-e Do Rural District, Dorudzan District, Marvdasht County, Fars province, Iran. At the 2006 census, its population was 283, in 60 families.
