= Dormeh, Kurdistan =

Village in Kurdistan, Iran

Dormeh درمه
- Village
- Location within Iran
- Coordinates: 34°57′40″N 47°51′12″E
- Country: Iran
- Province: Kurdistan
- County: Qorveh
- Bakhsh: Chaharduli
- Rural District: Chaharduli-ye Gharbi

Population (2006)
  - Total: 93
- Time zone: UTC+3:30 (IRST)
  - Summer (DST): UTC+4:30 (IRDT)

Dormeh (Persian: درمه) is a village in Chaharduli-ye Gharbi Rural District, Chaharduli District, Qorveh County, Kurdistan Province, Iran. At the 2006 census, its population was 93, in 21 families. The village is populated by Kurds.
