= Gharbi, Afghanistan =

Gharbi غربی
- Village
- Location in Afghanistan
- Coordinates: 32°39′36″N 65°29′35″E
- Country: Afghanistan
- Province: Uruzgan Province

Gharbi (also called Kakrak) is a village of Orūzgān Province, Afghanistan. It is located at 32.6608°N 65.4906°E.

== See also ==
- Orūzgān Province
