= Seh Tolan, Sepidan =

Seh Tolan سه تلان
- Village
- Location within Iran
- Coordinates: 29°57′24″N 52°26′08″E
- Country: Iran
- Province: Fars
- County: Sepidan
- Bakhsh: Beyza
- Rural District: Kushk-e Hezar

Population (2006)
  - Total: 220
- Time zone: UTC+3:30 (IRST)
  - Summer (DST): UTC+4:30 (IRDT)

Seh Tolan (Persian: سه تلان, also Romanized as Seh Tolān) is a village in Kushk-e Hezar Rural District, Beyza District, Sepidan County, Fars province, Iran. At the 2006 census, its population was 220, in 38 families.
