= Tahina Razafindramary =

Malagasy educationalist and teacher

Tahinaharinoro "Tahina" Razafindramary is an educationalist and former teacher from Madagascar.

Razafindramary started her career as a high school mathematics teacher in the south of the country, before joining the planning department of Madagascar's Ministry of Education.

In 2005, Razafindramary was the director of DPEFST.

Razafindramary has been responsible for the Global Partnership for Education (GPE), with support from UNICEF, in several countries in Africa, including Djibouti, and the Central African Republic. In 2015, she was GPE's country director for the Central African Republic. She is the country lead for Djibouti.

Razafindramary is GPE's country lead for the Central Africa Republic, Benin, Djibouti, Democratic Republic of Congo, Mauritania, Niger, Guinea-Bissau, and Togo.

In respect of GPE and a report from the World Bank, "Djibouti Needs to Build and Expand on Achievements to Educate the Next Generation", Razafindramary has commented, "What’s most remarkable about this program, is that out-of-school children, particularly those living in remote areas as well as children living with physical impairments will be able to access and complete primary and junior secondary school." Djibouti has made "significant progress", particularly compared to neighbouring Somalia and Eritrea, both of which have substantially levels of school enrollment, but is still unlikely to meet its Millennium Development Goals.
