= Islamic Azad University, Shiraz Branch =

University in Iran

- دانشگاه آزاد اسلامی واحد شیراز
- College of Economics and Management, Islamic Azad University of Shiraz, Iran
- Motto: "Iranian aspirations for globalization"
- Type: Private
- Established: 1987
- Faculty: ~ 300
- Students: ~ 17,000
- Location: Shiraz, Fars province, Iran
- Campus: Urban
- Colors: Turquoise and White
- Website: shiraz.iau.ir

The Islamic Azad University, Shiraz Branch (Persian: دانشگاه آزاد اسلامی واحد شیراز, romanized: Daneshgah-e Âzad-e Eslâmi-ye Vahed-e Shiraz) is a private university located in Shiraz, Iran. It is part of a private chain of universities in Iran called the Islamic Azad Universities. The Islamic Azad University of Shiraz with over 290 faculty and academic staff, 82,000 square meters of educational space, 7,500 square meters of administration space, 15,200 square meters of sporting space, is the biggest private university in the southern region of Iran.

The headquarters of the Islamic Azad University is in Tehran, Iran. The Islamic Azad University was founded in 1982 and currently has an enrollment of 1.7 million students, 30,000 Alumni and 35,000 Administrators. Over 3.5 million students have graduated from the Islamic Azad University since its establishment. Islamic Azad University has a total area of 16 million square meters and over 440 branches across Iran and also in other countries around the world. It has also international branches and universities in the U.A.E, United Kingdom, Tanzania, Lebanon, Afghanistan and Armenia and has plans to establish more branch campuses in Malaysia, Canada, and Tajikistan in the near future.

The total area of the university is said to be 20 million square meters. Some 4 million students have graduated from this university to this date. In the recent years a lot of effort has been made to expand the graduate studies at the Islamic Azad University. The Islamic Azad University has about 200,000 Master's Degree students and about 20,000 PhD level students.

The university system also operates a news agency similar to ANA, named "Azad News Agency". The Islamic Azad University also operates some 617 schools throughout the country, these schools are known as SAMA (Persian: سما).

The degrees and certificates issued by this university are recognized by the Ministry of Science and Higher Education. Post-graduate degrees have been offered in many different branches of Islamic Azad University.

== History ==
Islamic Azad University of Shiraz is a private university located in Shiraz, Iran. It is a part of private chain of universities in Iran called the Islamic Azad Universities. The Islamic Azad University of Shiraz was established in 1987 and it is the biggest Private University in southern part of Iran. The Islamic Azad University of Shiraz was the first in offering many new and different degrees. This university was the first in the southern part of Iran to offers a degree in Industrial Engineering . The Faculty of Art and Architecture of the university was also the first among other universities in Shiraz in offering a degree in Architecture, Music and Theater studies . The Islamic Azad University is divided into different zones. The Shiraz branch is in the Zone One (Persian: منطقه یک).

== Today ==
The Islamic Azad University of Shiraz was appointed as a comprehensive university (Persian: دانشگاه جامع) in 2011. This university has over 290 faculty and academic staff members, with 82,000 square meters of educational space, 7,500 square meters of administration space, 15,200 square meters of sporting space. Currently 17,000 students in different fields of studies and degrees study at this university. Degrees offered at this university include; Associate degrees (2 years), Bachelor's degrees (3, 4 or 5 years), Master's degrees (2 or 3 years), and Doctorate degrees ( 4 or 5 years).

== Campuses ==
Faculty of Engineering (2), Islamic Azad University of Shiraz, Iran

Faculty of Humanities and Social Sciences, Islamic Azad University of Shiraz, Iran

Faculty of Arts and Architecture, Islamic Azad University of Shiraz, Iran

The Islamic Azad University of Shiraz has four major campuses in the city of Shiraz and the neighbouring city of Sadra (Persian: شهر صدرا). Faculty of Art and Architecture is in the historic part of the city. The other three campuses are in the newly built city of Sadra, about 30 kilometers north west from Shiraz.

The newly built Pardis Campus is nearly 158 acres. The Pardis Campus is home to the Faculties of Engineering, Economics and Management, Agriculture and Chemistry.

== Colleges and Faculties ==
Colleges bring together academics and students from a broad range of disciplines, and within each faculty or department within the university, academics from many different colleges can be found.

- Faculty of Arts and Architecture
  - Department of Architecture
  - Department of Painting
  - Department of Music
  - Department of Theater and Plays
- Faculty of Engineering
  - Department of Industrial Engineering
  - Department of Mechanical Engineering
  - Department of Civil Engineering
  - Department of Computer Engineering
  - Department of Polymer Engineering
  - Department of Metallurgy Engineering
  - Department of Petroleum Engineering
- Faculty of Economics and Management
  - Department of Industrial Management
  - Department of Marketing Management
  - Department of Insurance Management
  - Department of Educational Management
  - Department of Development and Planning
  - Department of Industrial Economics
  - Department of Marketing Economics
  - Department of Economics Sciences
  - Department of Accounting
- Faculty of Dentistry
- Faculty of Humanities and Social Sciences
  - Department of Law
  - Department of Persian Literature
  - Department of Arabic Literature
  - Department of English
  - Department of Political Science
  - Department of Philosophy
- Faculty of Sciences
  - Department of Physics
  - Department of Geography
  - Department of Chemistry
  - Department of Athletics
- Faculty of Agricultural Engineering
  - Department of Water Engineering
  - Department of Soil Sciences
  - Department of Plant Diseases
  - Department of Gardening Sciences

== Student organisations ==
There are several student organisations active throughout the university. These organisations are mainly concentrate on academic activities, with some also interested and active in political and social issues.

== International Cooperation and Exchange ==
The Office of International Exchange Programs at the Islamic Azad University of Shiraz was established to provide students and faculty with exchange opportunities, including sending and hosting visiting scholars, aiding faculty members in arranging international study tours, developing exchange agreements with universities around the world. The university has developed academic cooperation with several international universities including Tokyo University of Foreign Studies.

== Academic year ==
The academic year is divided into three academic terms, determined by the university and the ministry of higher education. The first academic term usually starts on 23 September. The second Academic term usually starts on 11 February, and the Summer term is usually started from 10 July.

== International English Language Testing System (IELTS) ==
From 2012, the Islamic Azad University of Shiraz is going to be the official test centre for IDP IELTS Australia in the south of Iran.

== See also ==
- List of universities in Iran
- List of universities in Fars Province
- List of Iranian research centers
- Higher education in Iran
- List of pre-modern Iranian scientists and scholars
- List of contemporary Iranian scientists, scholars, and engineers
- Education in Iran
- National Library and Archives of Iran
