= Murdak, Jahrom =

Murdak موردك
- Village
- Location within Iran
- Coordinates: 28°26′35″N 53°52′50″E
- Country: Iran
- Province: Fars
- County: Jahrom
- Bakhsh: Central
- Rural District: Kuhak

Population (2006)
  - Total: 292
- Time zone: UTC+3:30 (IRST)
  - Summer (DST): UTC+4:30 (IRDT)

Murdak (Persian: موردك, also Romanized as Mūrdak) is a village in Kuhak Rural District, in the Central District of Jahrom County, Fars province, Iran. At the 2006 census, its population was 292, in 57 families.
