= Rikan, Fars =

Rikan ريكان
- Village
- Location within Iran
- Coordinates: 28°35′20″N 52°58′24″E
- Country: Iran
- Province: Fars
- County: Qir and Karzin
- Bakhsh: Central
- Rural District: Fathabad

Population (2006)
  - Total: 104
- Time zone: UTC+3:30 (IRST)
  - Summer (DST): UTC+4:30 (IRDT)

Rikan (Persian: ريكان, also Romanized as Reykan, Reykān, and Rīkān; also known as Rāhkān, Raichun, Raishun, Rīchān, and Rīgān) is a village in Fathabad Rural District, in the Central District of Qir and Karzin County, Fars province, Iran. At the 2006 census, its population was 104, in 29 families.
