= Gunak, Eskelabad =

Gunak گونك
- Village
- Location within Iran
- Coordinates: 28°41′14″N 60°35′31″E
- Country: Iran
- Province: Sistan and Baluchestan
- County: Khash
- Bakhsh: Nukabad
- Rural District: Eskelabad

Population (2006)
  - Total: 190
- Time zone: UTC+3:30 (IRST)
  - Summer (DST): UTC+4:30 (IRDT)

Gunak (Persian: گونك, also Romanized as Gūnak) is a village in Eskelabad Rural District, Nukabad District, Khash County, Sistan and Baluchestan Province, Iran. At the 2006 census, its population was 190, in 51 families.
