= Murdak, Kazerun =

Moordak موردك
- Village
- Location within Iran
- Coordinates: 29°43′23″N 51°45′09″E
- Country: Iran
- Province: Fars
- County: Kazeroon
- Bakhsh: Kuhmareh
- Rural District: Kuhmareh

Population (2006)
  - Total: 1,138
- Time zone: UTC+3:30 (IRST)
  - Summer (DST): UTC+4:30 (IRDT)

Murdak (Persian: موردك, also Romanized as Moordak) is a village in Kuhmareh Rural District, Kuhmareh District, Kazerun County, Fars province, Iran. At the 2006 census, its population was 1,138, in 252 families.

Murdak in Persian means small Moord. Moord is also the Persian name for the Myrtus communis plant. Some people from the village think that in the past the location of the village had many Myrtus communis although there are none there today.

The people of the village are Persians and they speak a special branch of Luri language.

The history of Murdak dates from ancient times, as there are many myths in the traditional culture regarding the village's past.

The village is near the historic city of Kazerun, and the region includes many ancient sites.

Its agriculture products include citrus orchards, wheat, and vines. Vineyards are the hallmark of Murdak where many kinds of vines are grown in a traditional way.
