= Ab Sardan-e Sofla Jowkar =

Ab Sardan-e Sofla Jowkar اب سردان سفلي جوكار
- Village
- Location within Iran
- Coordinates: 31°03′06″N 50°58′23″E
- Country: Iran
- Province: Kohgiluyeh and Boyer-Ahmad
- County: Boyer-Ahmad
- Bakhsh: Margown
- Rural District: Margown

Population (2006)
  - Total: 189
- Time zone: UTC+3:30 (IRST)
  - Summer (DST): UTC+4:30 (IRDT)

Ab Sardan-e Sofla Jowkar (Persian: اب سردان سفلي جوكار, also Romanized as Āb Sardān-e Soflá Jowkār; also known as Āb Sardān-e Soflá) is a village in Margown Rural District, Margown District, Boyer-Ahmad County, Kohgiluyeh and Boyer-Ahmad province, Iran. At the 2006 census, its population was 189, in 35 families.
