= Ab Sardan-e Tal Deraz =

Village in Kohgiluyeh and Boyer-Ahmad, Iran

Ab Sardan-e Tal Deraz اب سردان تل دراز
- Village
- Location within Iran
- Coordinates: 31°03′08″N 50°58′38″E
- Country: Iran
- Province: Kohgiluyeh and Boyer-Ahmad
- County: Boyer-Ahmad
- Bakhsh: Ludab
- Rural District: Ludab

Population (2006)
  - Total: 212
- Time zone: UTC+3:30 (IRST)
  - Summer (DST): UTC+4:30 (IRDT)

Ab Sardan-e Tal Deraz (Persian: اب سردان تل دراز, also Romanized as Āb Sardān-e Tal Derāz; also known as Āb Sardān-e Vosţá) is a village in Ludab Rural District, Ludab District, Boyer-Ahmad County, Kohgiluyeh and Boyer-Ahmad province, Iran. At the 2006 census, its population was 212, in 37 families.
