= Jahrom University =

- دانشگاه جهرم; Dāneshgāh-e-Jahrom
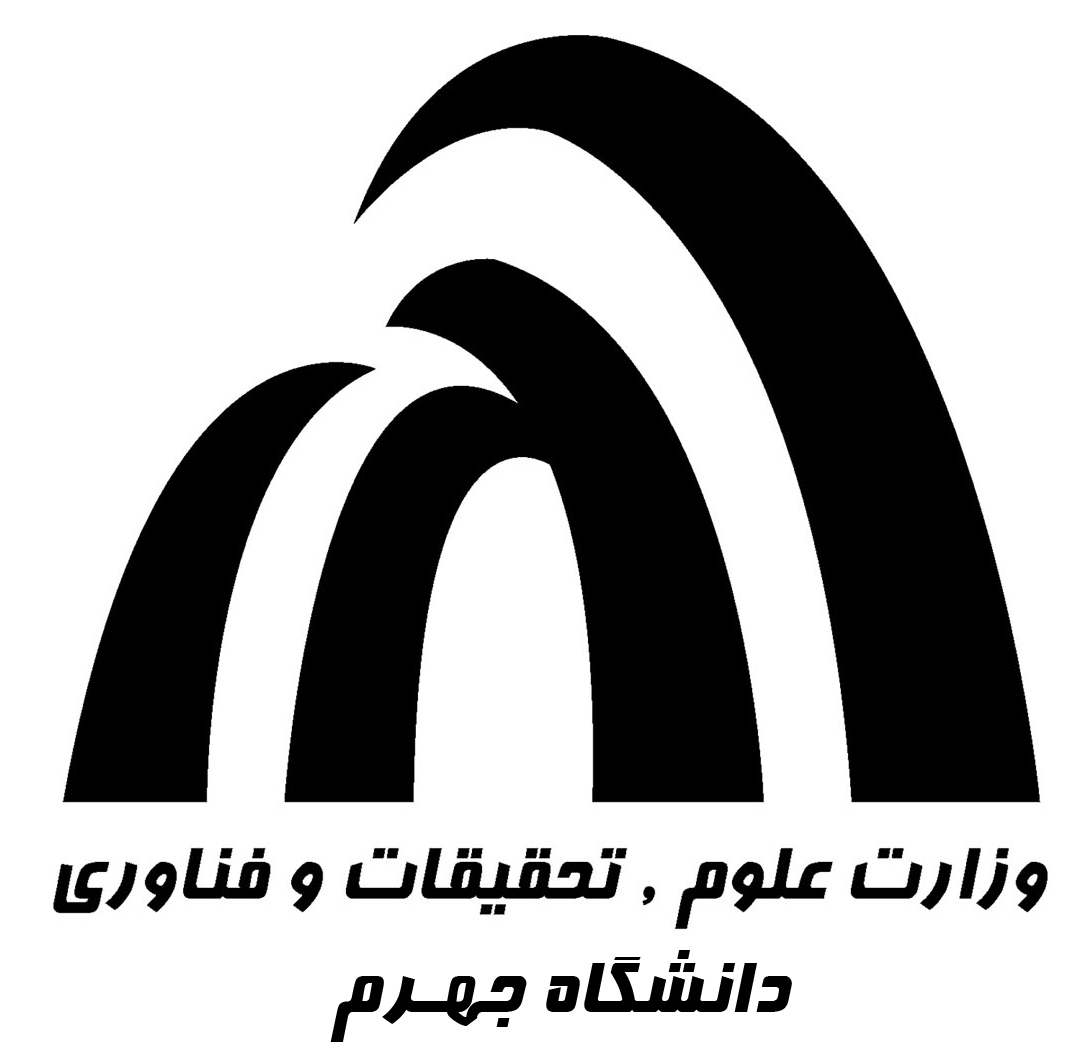
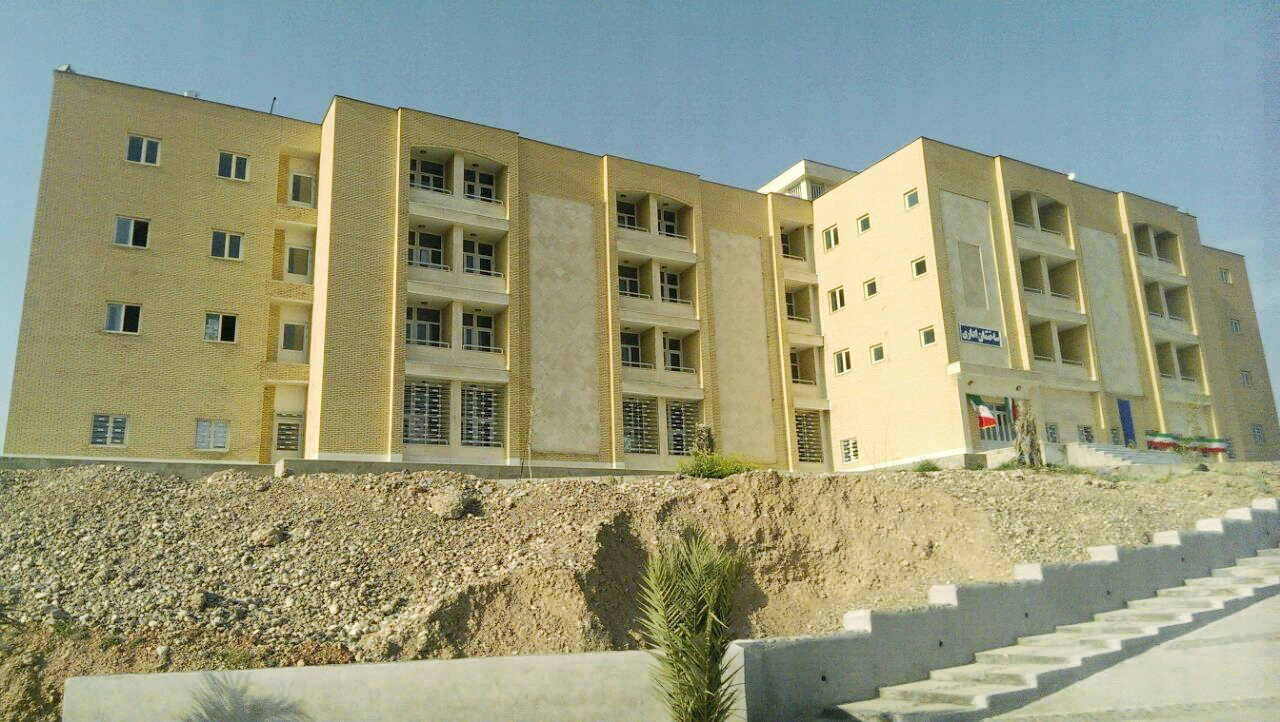
- Type: Public
- Established: 1973
- Chancellor: Dr. Mohammad Abbaszadeh Jahromi
- Students: around 3,300
- Location: Jahrom, Fars, Iran; 28°32′N 53°38′E
- Campus: Urban
- Website: jahromu.ac.ir
- Location within Iran

Jahrom University is a public university in Jahrom, Fars province, Iran. This university is depended to the Ministry of Science, Research and Technology (the government ministry of science, research and technology in Iran). In 1973, Jahrom University had first started its activities as an adjunct university in the form of Faculty of Basic Sciences for Shiraz University. This university then started its activities separately as a public university in 2006. The current president of the university is Dr. Kambiz Minaei.

The university offers undergraduate and graduate programs in a variety of disciplines.

== Faculties ==
Today the university has the following faculties:

1- Faculty of Basic Sciences

2- Faculty of Engineering and Technology

3- Faculty of Agriculture

4- Faculty of Literature and Humanities

== See also ==
- Jahrom University of Medical Sciences
- Islamic Azad University, Jahrom Branch
