= Kalateh Absardeh =

Kalateh Absardeh كلاته ابسرده
- Village
- Location within Iran
- Coordinates: 33°47′56″N 48°37′23″E
- Country: Iran
- Province: Lorestan
- County: Borujerd
- Bakhsh: Central
- Rural District: Hemmatabad

Population (2006)
  - Total: 122
- Time zone: UTC+3:30 (IRST)
  - Summer (DST): UTC+4:30 (IRDT)

Kalateh Absardeh (Persian: كلاته ابسرده, also Romanized as Kalāteh Ābsardeh; also known as Ābsardeh, Āb-e Sard, and Āb-ī-Sārd) is a village in Hemmatabad Rural District, in the Central District of Borujerd County, Lorestan Province, Iran. At the 2006 census, its population was 122, in 30 families.
