= Sehtolan, Kazerun =

Sehtolan سه تلان
- Village
- Location within Iran
- Coordinates: 29°19′05″N 51°51′06″E
- Country: Iran
- Province: Fars
- County: Kazerun
- Bakhsh: Jereh and Baladeh
- Rural District: Dadin

Population (2006)
  - Total: 262
- Time zone: UTC+3:30 (IRST)
  - Summer (DST): UTC+4:30 (IRDT)

Sehtolan (Persian: سه تلان, also Romanized as Sehtolān) is a village in Dadin Rural District, Jereh and Baladeh District, Kazerun County, Fars province, Iran. At the 2006 census, its population was 262, in 55 families.
