= Ab Sardan-e Olya Jowkar =

Ab Sardan-e Olya Jowkar اب سردان علياجوكار
- Village
- Location within Iran
- Coordinates: 31°02′42″N 50°58′48″E
- Country: Iran
- Province: Kohgiluyeh and Boyer-Ahmad
- County: Boyer-Ahmad
- Bakhsh: Margown
- Rural District: Margown

Population (2006)
  - Total: 147
- Time zone: UTC+3:30 (IRST)
  - Summer (DST): UTC+4:30 (IRDT)

Ab Sardan-e Olya Jowkar (Persian: اب سردان علياجوكار, also Romanized as Āb Sardān-e 'Olyā Jowkār; also known as Āb-e Sard-e Now and Āb Sardān-e 'Olyā) is a village in Margown Rural District, Margown District, Boyer-Ahmad County, Kohgiluyeh and Boyer-Ahmad province, Iran. At the 2006 census, its population was 147, in 23 families.
