= Rahgan-e Shomali Rural District =

Rural district in Fars province, Iran

Rahgan-e Shomali Rural District Persian: دهستان راهگان شمالی
- Rural District
- Location within Iran
- Coordinates: 28°50′51″N 53°21′59″E
- Country: Iran
- Province: Fars
- County: Khafr
- District: Rahgan
- Capital: Tadavan
- Time zone: UTC+3:30 (IRST)

Rahgan-e Shomali Rural District (Persian: دهستان راهگان شمالی) is in Rahgan District of Khafr County, Fars province, Iran. Its capital is the village of Tadavan, whose population at the time of the 2016 National Census was 1,013 in 344 households.

== History ==
In 2019, Khafr District was separated from Jahrom County in the establishment of Khafr County, and Rahgan-e Shomali Rural District was created in the new Rahgan District.
