= Gel Berenji Rural District =

Rural district in Fars province, Iran

Gel Berenji Rural District Persian: دهستان گل برنجي
- Rural District
- Location within Iran
- Coordinates: 28°54′11″N 53°16′32″E
- Country: Iran
- Province: Fars
- County: Khafr
- District: Central
- Capital: Gel Berenji

Population (2016)
  - Total: 8,650
- Time zone: UTC+3:30 (IRST)

Gel Berenji Rural District (Persian: دهستان گل برنجي) is in the Central District of Khafr County, Fars province, Iran. Its capital is the village of Gel Berenji.

== Demographics ==
=== Population ===
At the time of the 2006 National Census, the rural district's population (as a part of the former Khafr District of Jahrom County) was 7,281 in 1,764 households. There were 8,080 inhabitants in 2,258 households at the following census of 2011. The 2016 census measured the population of the rural district as 8,650 in 2,666 households. The most populous of its 35 villages was Gel Berenji, with 1,679 people.

In 2019, the district was separated from the county in the establishment of Khafr County, and the rural district was transferred to the new Central District.
