= Bab Anar =

City in Fars province, Iran

Bab Anar Persian: باب انار
- City
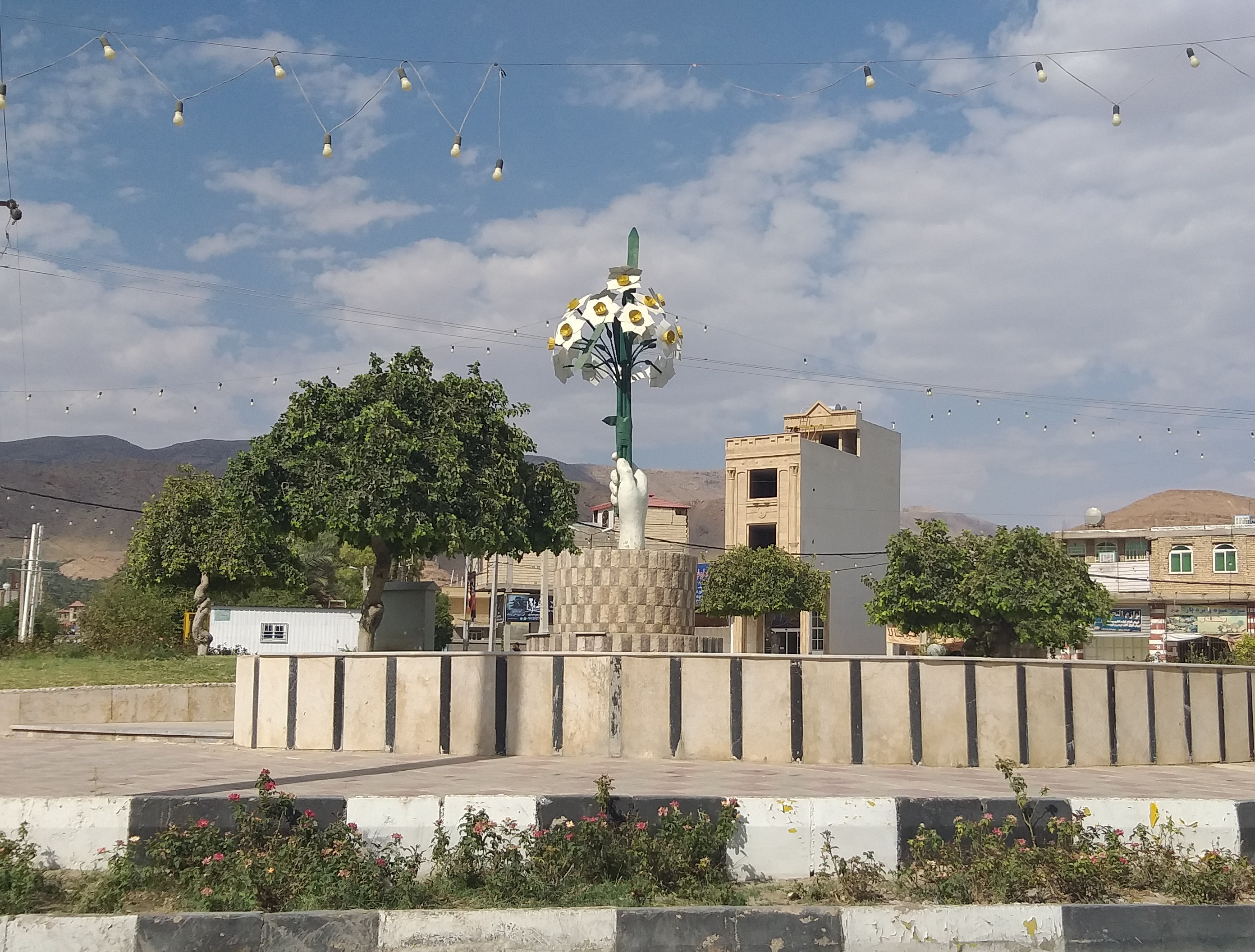
- Bab Anar center

- Location within Iran
- Coordinates: 28°58′02″N 53°12′42″E
- Country: Iran
- Province: Fars
- County: Khafr
- District: Central

Population (2016)
  - Total: 7,061
- Time zone: UTC+3:30 (IRST)

Bab Anar (Persian: باب انار) (Note: Also romanized as Bāb Anār and Bāb-e Anār; also known as Bābā Anār, Bābā Na‘am, Bābā Najm, and Bāba Nār) is a city in the Central District of Khafr County, Fars province, Iran, serving as capital of both the county and the district. It was the administrative center for Khafr Rural District until its capital was transferred to the village of Zarjan.

== Demographics ==
=== Population ===
At the time of the 2006 National Census, the city's population was 1,702 in 445 households, when it was capital of the former Khafr District of Jahrom County. The following census in 2011 counted 6,968 people in 2,096 households. The 2016 census measured the population of the city as 7,061 people in 2,230 households.

In 2019, the district was separated from the county in the establishment of Khafr County, and Bab Anar was transferred to the new Central District as the county's capital.
