= Aliabad Rural District (Khafr County) =

Rural district in Fars province, Iran

Aliabad Rural District Persian: دهستان علی‌آباد
- Rural District
- Location within Iran
- Coordinates: 29°01′02″N 53°04′34″E
- Country: Iran
- Province: Fars
- County: Khafr
- District: Central
- Capital: Aliabad

Population (2016)
  - Total: 5,860
- Time zone: UTC+3:30 (IRST)

Aliabad Rural District (Persian: دهستان علی‌آباد) is in the Central District of Khafr County, Fars province, Iran. Its capital is the village of Aliabad.

== Demographics ==
=== Population ===
At the time of the 2006 National Census, the rural district's population (as a part of the former Khafr District of Jahrom County) was 7,138 in 1,796 households. There were 6,454 inhabitants in 1,884 households at the following census of 2011. The 2016 census measured the population of the rural district as 5,860 in 1,933 households. The most populous of its 19 villages was Aliabad, with 1,477 people.

In 2019, the district was separated from the county in the establishment of Khafr County, and the rural district was transferred to the new Central District.
