= Khafr Rural District =

Rural district in Fars province, Iran

Khafr Rural District Persian: دهستان خفر
- Rural District
- Location within Iran
- Coordinates: 28°57′38″N 53°12′28″E
- Country: Iran
- Province: Fars
- County: Khafr
- District: Central
- Capital: Zarjan

Population (2016)
  - Total: 3,396
- Time zone: UTC+3:30 (IRST)

Khafr Rural District (Persian: دهستان خفر) is in the Central District of Khafr County, Fars province, Iran. Its capital is the village of Zarjan. The rural district was previously administered from Bab Anar.

== Demographics ==
=== Population ===
At the time of the 2006 National Census, the rural district's population (as a part of the former Khafr District of Jahrom County) was 8,359 in 2,136 households. There were 3,057 inhabitants in 879 households at the following census of 2011. The 2016 census measured the population of the rural district as 3,396 in 1,043 households. The most populous of its nine villages was Zarjan, with 1,400 people.

In 2019, the district was separated from the county in the establishment of Khafr County, and the rural district was transferred to the new Central District.
