= Sefidar Rural District =

Rural district in Fars province, Iran

Sefidar Rural District Persian: دهستان سفيدار
- Rural District
- Location within Iran
- Coordinates: 29°01′39″N 52°54′46″E
- Country: Iran
- Province: Fars
- County: Khafr
- District: Central
- Capital: Esmailabad

Population (2016)
  - Total: 3,893
- Time zone: UTC+3:30 (IRST)

Sefidar Rural District (Persian: دهستان سفيدار) is in the Central District of Khafr County, Fars province, Iran. Its capital is the village of Esmailabad.

== Demographics ==
=== Population ===
At the time of the 2006 National Census, the rural district's population (as a part of the former Khafr District of Jahrom County) was 4,214 in 1,112 households. There were 3,632 inhabitants in 1,070 households at the following census of 2011. The 2016 census measured the population of the rural district as 3,893 in 1,295 households. The most populous of its 26 villages was Kereft, with 1,390 people.

In 2019, the district was separated from the county in the establishment of Khafr County, and the rural district was transferred to the new Central District.
