= Central District (Khafr County) =

District in Fars province, Iran

Central District (Khafr County) Persian: بخش مرکزی شهرستان خفر
- District
- Location within Iran
- Coordinates: 28°59′19″N 53°03′33″E
- Country: Iran
- Province: Fars
- County: Khafr
- Capital: Bab Anar
- Time zone: UTC+3:30 (IRST)

The Central District of Khafr County (Persian: بخش مرکزی شهرستان خفر) is in Fars province, Iran. Its capital is the city of Bab Anar, whose population at the time of the 2016 National Census was 7,061 people in 2,230 households.

== History ==
In 2019, Khafr District was separated from Jahrom County in the establishment of Khafr County, which was divided into two districts and six rural districts, with Bab Anar as its capital.

== Demographics ==
Central District (Khafr County)
Administrative Divisions
Aliabad RD
Gel Berenji RD
Khafr RD
Sefidar RD
Bab Anar (city)
RD = Rural District
