= Rahgan Rural District =

Rural district in Fars province, Iran

Rahgan Rural District Persian: دهستان راهگان
- Rural District
- Location within Iran
- Coordinates: 28°52′20″N 53°04′40″E
- Country: Iran
- Province: Fars
- County: Khafr
- District: Rahgan
- Capital: Bagh-e Kabir

Population (2016)
  - Total: 9,071
- Time zone: UTC+3:30 (IRST)

Rahgan Rural District (Persian: دهستان راهگان) is in Rahgan District of Khafr County, Fars province, Iran. Its capital is the village of Bagh-e Kabir. The previous capital of the rural district was the village of Tadavan.

== Demographics ==
=== Population ===
At the time of the 2006 National Census, the rural district's population (as a part of the former Khafr District of Jahrom County) was 8,368 in 1,994 households. There were 8,269 inhabitants in 2,442 households at the following census of 2011. The 2016 census measured the population of the rural district as 9,071 in 2,890 households. The most populous of its 37 villages was Qaleyni, with 1,160 people.

In 2019, the district was separated from the county in the establishment of Khafr County, and the rural district was transferred to the new Rahgan District.
