= Rahgan District =

District in Fars province, Iran

Rahgan District Persian: بخش راهگان
- District
- Location within Iran
- Coordinates: 28°50′51″N 53°12′28″E
- Country: Iran
- Province: Fars
- County: Khafr
- Capital: Khavaran
- Time zone: UTC+3:30 (IRST)

Rahgan District (Persian: بخش راهگان) is in Khafr County, Fars province, Iran. Its capital is the city of Khavaran, whose population at the time of the 2016 National Census was 4,332 people in 1,533 households.

== History ==
In 2019, Khafr District was separated from Jahrom County in the establishment of Khafr County, which was divided into two districts and six rural districts, with the city of Bab Anar as its capital.

== Demographics ==
=== Administrative divisions ===
Rahgan District
Administrative Divisions
Rahgan RD
Rahgan-e Shomali RD
Khavaran (city)
RD = Rural District
