= Khafr District =

Former district in Fars province, Iran

Khafr District Persian: بخش خفر
- Former District
- Location within Iran
- Coordinates: 28°54′N 53°07′E
- Country: Iran
- Province: Fars
- County: Jahrom
- Capital: Bab Anar

Population (2016)
  - Total: 42,263
- Time zone: UTC+3:30 (IRST)

Khafr District (Persian: بخش خفر) is a former administrative division of Jahrom County, Fars province, Iran. Its capital was the city of Bab Anar.

== History ==
In 2019, the district was separated from the county in the establishment of Khafr County.

== Demographics ==
=== Population ===
At the time of the 2006 National Census, the district's population was 42,199 in 10,550 households. The following census in 2011 counted 40,535 people in 11,860 households. The 2016 census measured the population of the district as 42,263 inhabitants in 13,590 households.

=== Administrative divisions ===
Khafr District Population
Administrative Divisions	2006	2011	2016
Aliabad RD	7,138	6,454	5,860
Gel Berenji RD	7,281	8,080	8,650
Khafr RD	8,359	3,057	3,396
Rahgan RD	8,368	8,269	9,071
Sefidar RD	4,214	3,632	3,893
Bab Anar (city)	1,702	6,968	7,061
Khavaran (city)	5,137	4,075	4,332
Total	42,199	40,535	42,263
RD = Rural District
