= Khafr County =

County in Fars province, Iran

Khafr County Persian: شهرستان خفر
- County
- Location of Khafr County in Fars province (center, yellow)

- Location of Fars province in Iran
- Coordinates: 28°54′N 53°07′E
- Country: Iran
- Province: Fars
- Capital: Bab Anar
- Districts: Central, Rahgan
- Time zone: UTC+3:30 (IRST)

Khafr County (Persian: شهرستان خفر) is in Fars province, Iran. Its capital is the city of Bab Anar, whose population at the time of the 2016 National Census was 7,061 people in 2,230 households.

== History ==
In 2019, Khafr District was separated from Jahrom County in the establishment of Khafr County, which was divided into two districts and six rural districts, with Bab Anar as its capital.

=== Administrative divisions ===
Khafr County's administrative structure is shown in the following table.

Khafr County
Administrative Divisions
Central District
Aliabad RD
Gel Berenji RD
Khafr RD
Sefidar RD
Bab Anar (city)
Rahgan District
Rahgan RD
Rahgan-e Shomali RD
Khavaran (city)
RD = Rural District

== See also ==
Media related to Khafr County at Wikimedia Commons
