= Narak =

Narak may refer to:

== Places in Iran ==
- Naraq, a city in Markazi Province
- Narak, Fars, a village in Nujin Rural District, in the Central District of Farashband County, Fars Province
- Narak, Kohgiluyeh and Boyer-Ahmad, a village in Emamzadeh Jafar Rural District, in the Central District of Gachsaran County, Kohgiluyeh and Boyer-Ahmad Province
- Anarak, Arsanjan or Narak, a village in Khobriz Rural District, in the Central District of Arsanjan County, Fars Province
- Naru, Fars or Narak, a village in Aliabad Rural District, Khafr District, Jahrom County, Fars Province
- Narak-e Qasemi, a village in Jangal Rural District, in the Central District of Fasa County, Fars Province

== Other uses ==
- Naraka, a Sanskrit word referring to the underworld in Hinduism, Sikhism, Jainism and Buddhism
  - Naraka (Hinduism)
  - Naraka (Buddhism)
  - Naraka (Jainism)
- Narak language, a language of New Guinea

== See also ==
- Neraka (disambiguation)
- Raurava (disambiguation)
- Narka (disambiguation)
