= Neraka =

Neraka has a number of meanings.

- Neraka is another spelling of Naraka, the underworld and Hell in Indian religions, such as Hinduism, Buddhism and Jainism
  - Naraka (Hinduism)
  - Naraka (Buddhism)
  - Naraka (Jainism)
- Knights of Neraka, fictional characters in the Dragonlance fantasy series

== See also ==
- Narak (disambiguation)
- Narka (disambiguation)
