= Raurava =

Raurava denotes a hell in:

- Naraka, in Indian religions
  - Naraka (Hinduism)
  - Naraka (Buddhism)
  - Naraka (Jainism)

== See also ==
- Narak (disambiguation)
