= Hell wardens =

Buddhist demons, who torture the sinners in hell

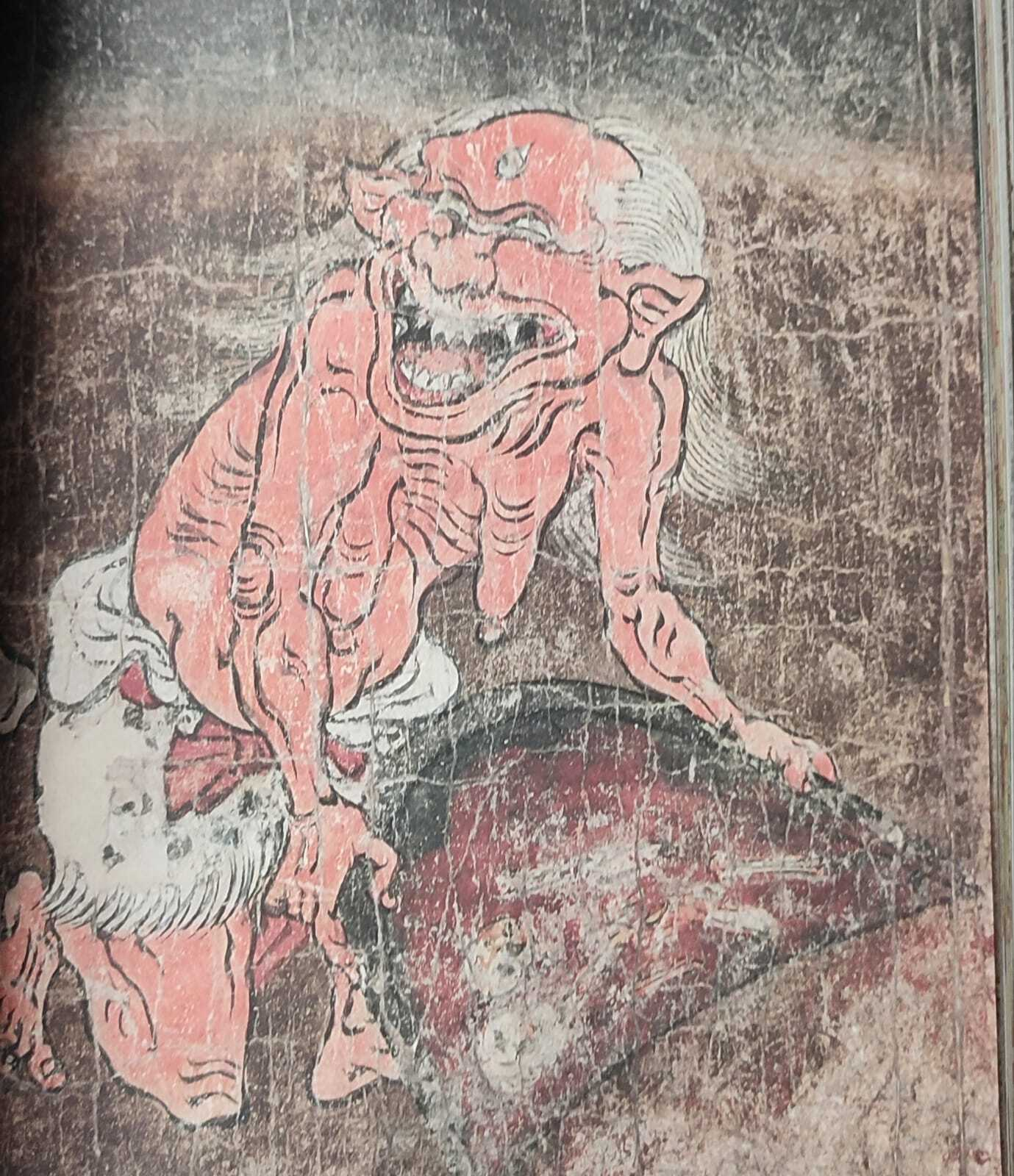
Jigokuzōshi, Handscroll, Heian-Kamakura Period, 12th century, Nara National Museum

In Buddhism, the Hell Wardens (nirayapāla) torture the sinners in Naraka (hell).

Sometimes they serve under Yama, the king of death and the underworld, in Indian beliefs.

According to Vasubandhu, the Hell Wardens have no external reality, but are merely a subjective perception formed from bad karma.

== Description ==
The hell wardens are depicted and described as torturing the sinners within naraka, the concept of Buddhist hell. These hell wardens are also called demons and can be interpreted as Buddhist raksasas or (in Japanese culture) onis. The depictions of oni arrived at Japan with the advent of Buddhist hell imagery. Common to all descriptions of the hell wardens is that they inflict different types of punishments upon the inhabitants of hell.

In some depictions the hell wardens are the servants of Yama. As beings are liberated from suffering, they came to the master of Dharma saying: "Because we are the guardians of hell, when hell is full, we rejoice. When hell is empty, we lament. Now we have come to complain that hell has become void."

Furthermore, stories of Buddha interacting with the hell wardens are written down. In one of these stories Buddha is reborn in hell as a wagon puller. In this existence Buddha saw another wagon puller and was overcome with compassion, saying to the hell warden: "Please let my friend go. I will pull this wagon myself." The hell warden grew angry at Buddha and killed him, resulting in Buddha's rebirth in the deva realm.

In the Blood-bowl Sutra, which was composed late twelfth or early thirteenth century in China, describes women who are made to suffer by hell wardens by drinking their own menstrual blood. Women are made to suffer for the reason of their female biology that produces menstrual blood.

Based on a comparative study of early Buddhist texts, Bhikkhu Anālayo argues that depictions of hell wardens may have emerged as an outcome of literalist readings of references originally intended in a more metaphorical sense.

=== Smṛtyupasthāna ===
In the Smṛtyupasthāna tortures are described for those who garner bad karma through their acts. One of these acts is the violation of a pious laywoman. One who has committed such a crime is to be reborn in one of the Pratāpana subhells: They are lured to gorgeous mountains and other beautiful landscapes, once they approach the mountains and landscapes transform and destroy them. Afterwards they are captured by hell wardens and their buttocks are cut off only for the buttocks to regrow and continue this torture for a very long period.

Another subhell is described as a place for laywomen or nuns who have seduced a Buddhist monk. These women are then skinned alive by the hell wardens. After this, their body recovers but with an ugly hue, only to be boiled alive by the hell wardens.

=== Ten Kings ===
In the judgement within hell it is described that the wardens of hell drag the sinner in front of the throne of King Yama. Yama then asks the sinner whether or not they saw the five messengers devas who are sent to teach sentient beings. The sinner then admits that they have indeed witnessed those devas, but chose not to learn from then. Afterwards the wardens of hells drag the sinner to the suitable place of torment.

In Vietnamese understanding of Buddhism, there is not only one but Ten Kings of Buddhist hell who judge souls to estimate their torture in hell. They are associated with the Buddha since they teach the hell inhabitants the effects of their actions.

== Hell wardens in art ==
=== Hell scroll ===
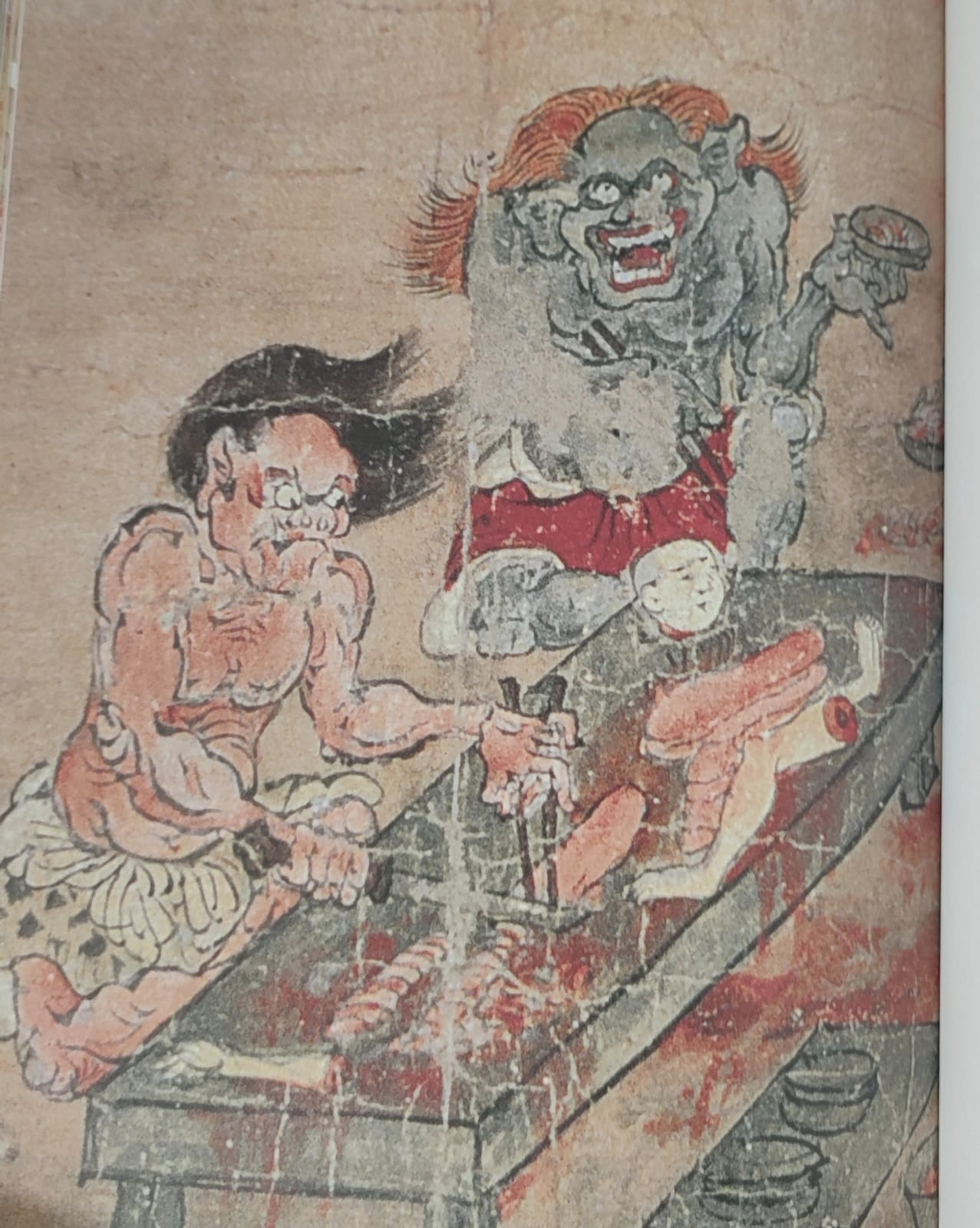
Hell For Priests Scroll

The hell scroll (jigokuzōshi) was created in Heian Japan and depicts the small hells as described in the Sutra on the Arisings of Worlds (Kisekyō). This hell warden is located in the Hell of Excrement, where there is excrement everywhere and insects who eat the hell beings.

=== Hell for Priests scroll ===
The Hell for Priests scroll (shamon jigoku-zōshi) was created in the 12-13th century in Japan. Here a hell warden in the Hell of Dismemberment is shown, into which Buddhist monks fall who have killed and dismembered sentient beings. The hell wardens cut off the limbs of the Buddhist monks like the monks did with sentient beings and once they are dead, the hell wardens yell "Revive, revive!" and they are brought back to live only to experience the torture once again.

=== Scenes of Paradise and Hell ===
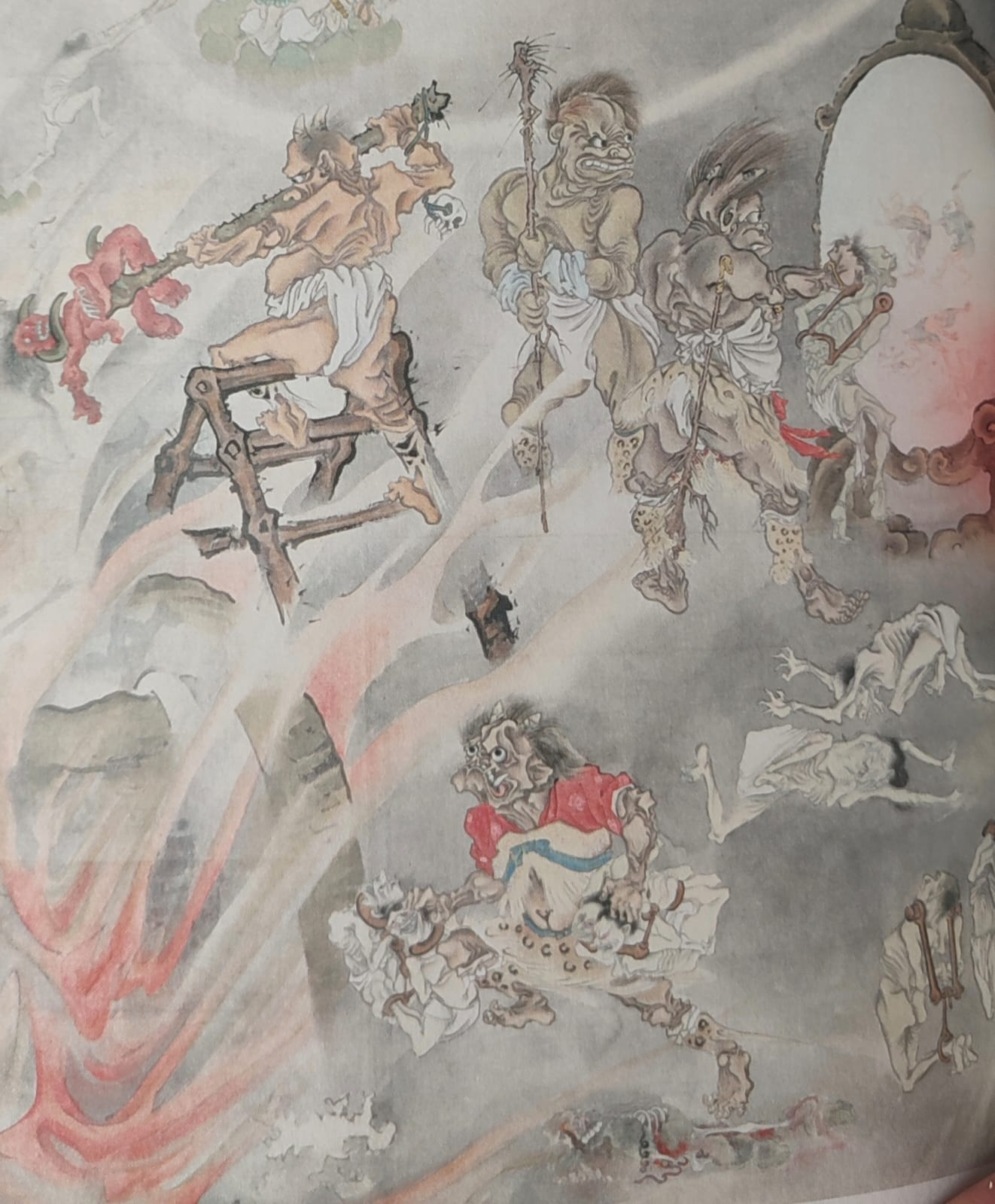
Hanging Scroll, late Edo Period, Tokyo National Museum

The hanging scroll of Scenes in Paradise and Hell (jigoku gokuraku-zu) depicts passed away people being judged by King Enma.It was created in the Edo-period in Japan. After their judgement they are carried away to be burned. The hell wardens here are drawn as bony and hairy figures.

=== Hell and Pure Land Painting ===
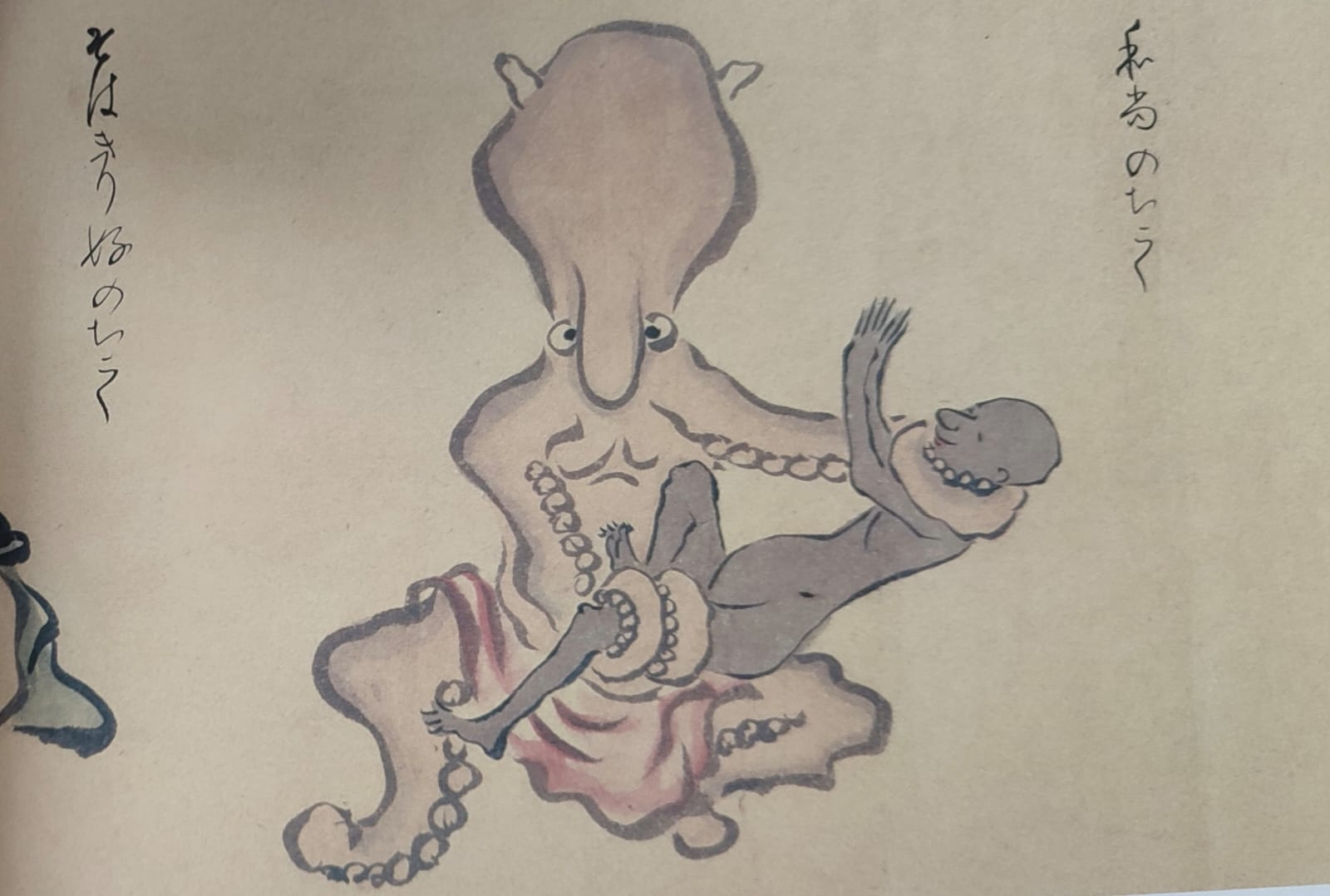
Handscroll, 18th century, Kumamoto Prefectural Museum of Art

This painting is made by Nichōsai in Japan in the 18th century. It depicts hells for those who have committed specific sins whill fall into. Rather than showing the horrors of those hells, he shows the hell wardens as parodies of various human tradespeople.

== Vasubandhu ==
Vasubandhu, in his argument for the Yogācāra doctrine of consciousness-only (vijñaptimātra), employs the example of the hell wardens to support his position. To counter the objection that the consciousness-only doctrine cannot account for the fact that multiple individuals appear to experience the same phenomena, Vasubandhu invokes the example of the hell wardens—beings who, though experienced collectively by those reborn in hell, are nevertheless understood to be projections of individual karmic consciousness.

Vasubandhu argues that the hell wardens do not truly exist, because images produced by the mind arise from transformations within the stream of consciousness and the objects of that stream of consciousness do not exist in the external world. However, these transformations of the consciousness that are brought about by bad karma in the form of hell wardens who torture them makes them suffer.

Vasubandhu in this case argues that hell is a type of "collective experience in the absence of objects as causes of content." Furthermore, the hell wardens must be part of hell and at the same time be removed from it to serve their function as torturers, otherwise they would suffer the same way as hell beings do and are not different from them. At the same time, the hell wardens are produced by consciousness of hell beings and are in that way connected to them. Also, hell cannot exists without hell wardens, because without them the hell's function as a place of suffering would cease to be.

== In popular culture ==
=== Mongolian ===
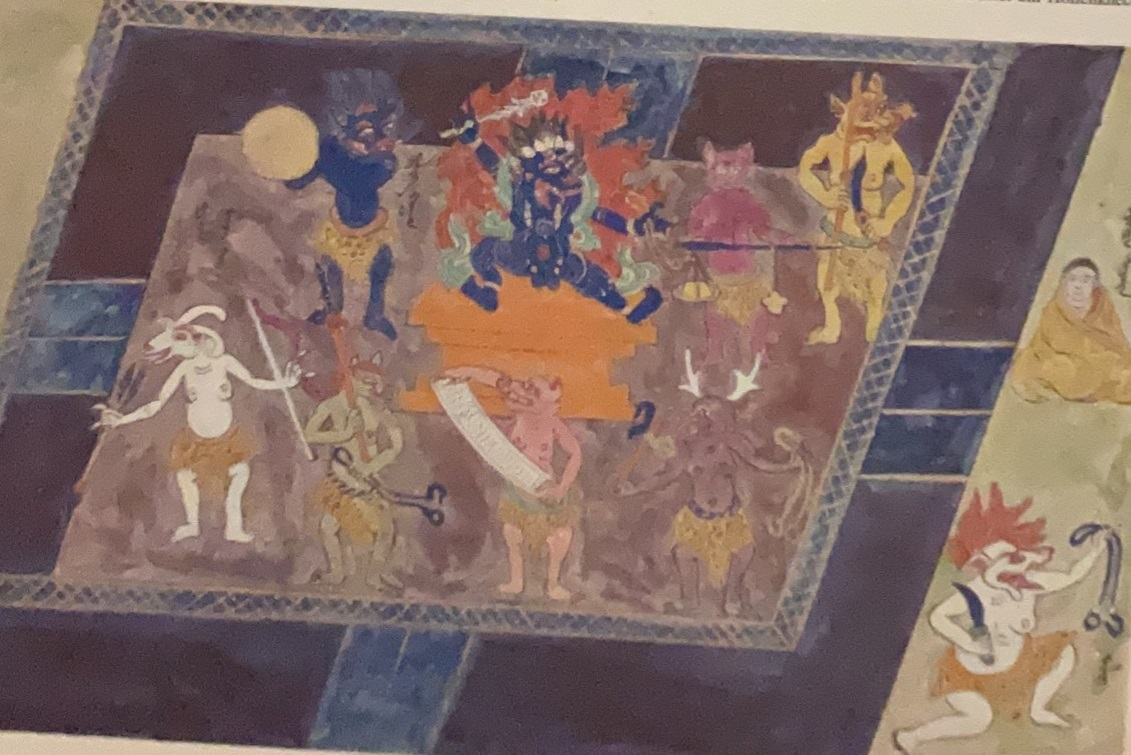
The city of the infernal king and god of death Yama, also known in Mongolia as Erlik-Khan, precedes court over the souls of the dead. In front of him, a Hell Warden is reading the scrolls of sins and virtues.

Hell Wardens appear in Mongolian Art and popular stories. In the Tale of Naranu-Gerel. Within the story, the protagonist travels to a far-away city to visit her husband. However, once she arrived in the city, she learns that her husband took a second wife. The devious father of the second wife poisons the protagonist. Upon death, she arrives in hell, the kingdom of Yama also known as Erlik Khan. Hell Wardens appear as the scribes and guardians at Erlik Khan's disposal.

However, she does not stay for long and is soon send back to the realm of the living by the king of the underworld. Back in the world of the living, she becomes a warrior, gains the favor of the emperor, and performs great pious deeds, which finally grands her the status of a celestial Dakini.

=== Japanese ===
The anime Hōzuki no Reitetsu 鬼灯の冷徹 (Hozuki's Coolheadedness) is a story about Hōzuki, an oni hell warden, who serves King Yama in his dealings in hell. It was created by Natsumi Eguchi 江口夏実 and serialised in the Kondansha Morning Seinen magazine from 2011 to 2020. The anime came out in the year 2014.
