= Narka =

Narka may refer to:

- Narka, California
- Narka, Kansas

== See also ==
- Narak (disambiguation) and Neraka (disambiguation), hell in Indian religions
