= Narak, Kohgiluyeh and Boyer-Ahmad =

Narak نارك
- Village
- Location within Iran
- Coordinates: 30°23′23″N 50°56′50″E
- Country: Iran
- Province: Kohgiluyeh and Boyer-Ahmad
- County: Gachsaran
- Bakhsh: Central
- Rural District: Emamzadeh Jafar

Population (2006)
  - Total: 17
- Time zone: UTC+3:30 (IRST)
  - Summer (DST): UTC+4:30 (IRDT)

Narak (Persian: نارك, also Romanized as Nārak) is a village in Emamzadeh Jafar Rural District, in the Central District of Gachsaran County, Kohgiluyeh and Boyer-Ahmad Province, Iran. At the 2006 census, its population was 17, in 5 families.
