= Narak-e Qasemi =

Narak-e Qasemi نارك قاسمي
- Village
- Location within Iran
- Coordinates: 29°03′30″N 53°30′01″E
- Country: Iran
- Province: Fars
- County: Fasa
- Bakhsh: Central
- Rural District: Jangal

Population (2006)
  - Total: 41
- Time zone: UTC+3:30 (IRST)
  - Summer (DST): UTC+4:30 (IRDT)

Narak-e Qasemi (Persian: نارك قاسمي, also Romanized as Nārak-e Qāsemī) is a village in Jangal Rural District, in the Central District of Fasa County, Fars province, Iran. At the 2006 census, its population was 41, in 8 families.
