= Naraka in Buddhism =

Hell in Buddhist mythologies

Naraka
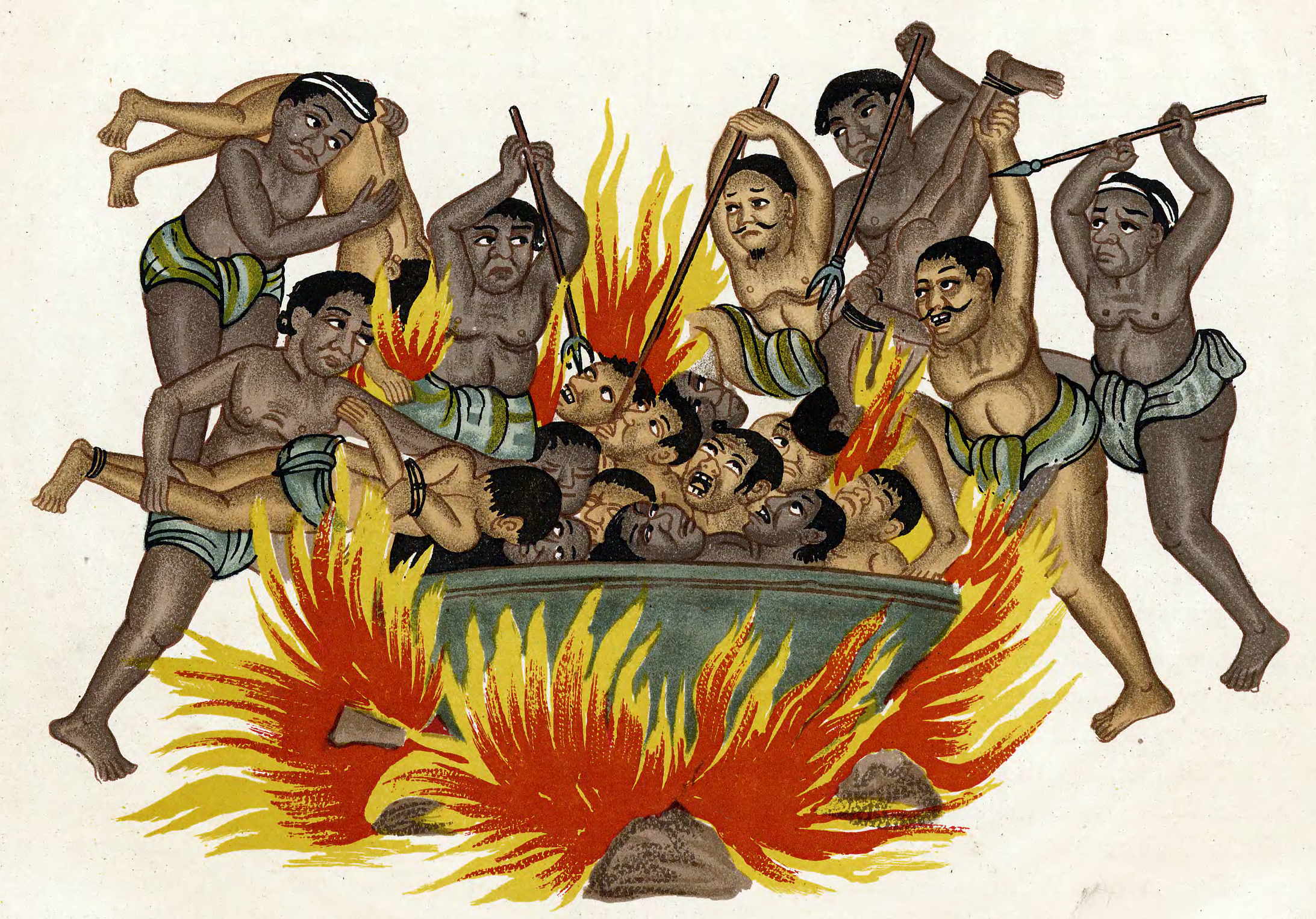
- Naraka in Burmese art

Chinese name
- Traditional Chinese: 地獄
- Simplified Chinese: 地狱
Transcriptions
Standard Mandarin
- Hanyu Pinyin: Dìyù
- Bopomofo: ㄉㄧˋㄩˋ
- Gwoyeu Romatzyh: dihyuh
- Wade–Giles: Ti⁴-yu⁴
- Tongyong Pinyin: dihyú
- Yale Romanization: dihyúm
- MPS2: díhyú
- IPA: [tî.iû]
other Mandarin
- Xiao'erjing: دۆزەخ
- Dungan: диюй
- Sichuanese Pinyin: d^{4} hiyu^{4}
Wu
- Romanization: Ti^{平}-ku^{入}
Gan
- Romanization: Ti-ku; Tiku
Xiang
- IPA: Ti^{33}-kiɛ^{24}/
Hakka
- Romanization: Ji^{24}-gouk^{2}
- Pha̍k-fa-sṳ: Ji-kguk
Yue: Cantonese
- Yale Romanization: deih yuhk
- Jyutping: dei6 juk6
- IPA: [ji˩.wkʰ] or [ji˩.hʊk̚˩]
Southern Min
- Hokkien POJ: Ti-ku
- Tâi-lô: Ti-ky
Eastern Min
- Fuzhou BUC: Ti-guk
Pu-Xian Min
- Hinghwa BUC: Ti-guk
Northern Min
- Jian'ou Romanized: Ti-guk

Burmese name
- Burmese: ငရဲ Nga Yè

Tibetan name
- Tibetan: དམྱལ་བ་
Transcriptions
- Wylie: Dmyal Ba
- Tibetan Pinyin: Nung-Wa

Vietnamese name
- Vietnamese alphabet: Địa ngục
- Chữ Hán: 地獄

Thai name
- Thai: นรก
- RTGS: Nárók

Korean name
- Hangul: 지옥
- Hanja: 地獄
Transcriptions
- Revised Romanization: Jiok
- McCune–Reischauer: Chiok

Mongolian name
- Mongolian Cyrillic: Там
- Mongolian script: ᠲᠠᠮ
Transcriptions
- SASM/GNC: Tam

Japanese name
- Kanji: 地獄 / 奈落
Transcriptions
- Romanization: Jigoku / Naraku

Malay name
- Malay: Neraka

Indonesian name
- Indonesian: Neraka, Jahanam

Filipino name
- Tagalog: Nalaka (ᜈᜎᜃ)

Lao name
- Lao: ນະຮົກ; Na Hok

Spanish name
- Spanish: infierno

Sanskrit name
- Sanskrit: नरक (in Devanagari); Naraka (Romanised)

Pāli name
- Pāli: 𑀦𑀺𑀭𑀬 (in Brahmi); Niraya (Romanised)

Naraka (Sanskrit: नरक; Chinese: 地獄／奈落; pinyin: Dìyù/Nàiluò; Japanese: 地獄／奈落, romanized: Jigoku/Naraku) is a term in Buddhist cosmology usually referred to in English as "hell" (or "hell realm") or "purgatory". Another term used for the concept of hell in earlier writings is niraya (Pali and Sanskrit). In Cambodia, Naraka was part of Buddhist cosmology and indeed also a Khmer word (នរក; norok) for hell. The Narakas of Buddhism are closely related to Diyu, the hell in Chinese mythology. A naraka differs from the concept of hell in Christianity and in Islam in two respects: firstly, beings are not sent to Naraka as the result of a divine judgment or punishment; secondly, the length of a being's stay in a naraka is not eternal, though it is usually incomprehensibly long.

A being is born into naraka as a direct result of its accumulated actions (karma) and resides there for a finite period of time until that karma has achieved its full result. After its karma is used up, it will be reborn in one of the higher worlds as the result of karma that had not yet ripened.

The eight hot naraka appear in Jātaka texts and form the basis of the hell system in Mahāyāna Buddhism. According to them, the hells are located deep under the southern continent of Jambudvīpa, denoting India. They are built one upon the other like stories, the principle being that the more severe kind of damnation is located under the previous one. There are differences in the conception of the naraka's height, breadth, length, depth, and distance, meaning that there is not a clear canonic system of naraka at this point of time besides their size.

== Historical background ==
Dating the idea of hell within Buddhist tradition proves to be difficult, since ideas were orally transmitted until about 100 BCE when the Pali canon was written down in Ceylon.

However, the concept of hell played a significant role since the early stage of Buddhism, since it is closely connected to the concept of karma. Karma determines into which realm a soul is born. Good actions cause someone to be reborn in heaven or as a human on earth. Bad actions cause one to be reborn in "bad states" (duggati) like animals, hungry ghosts, and as a hell resident. There is barely dharma within these existences and a rebirth in a higher realm is very difficult.

In the Kathāvatthu, one of the earliest Buddhist writings written around 250—100 BCE, a version of hell is fully developed, described, and discussed. It is probably one of the earliest religious works offering a presentation of hell imagery. It discusses related topics such as whether hell is the result of particular bad actions or the committed bad actions themselves. It further argues that hell is a state experienced in another life as the result of a bad action, connecting hell to the concept of the retribution for bad actions and compensation for good actions.

The historical Buddha rejected the reliance upon deities in order to encourage individuals to take responsibility for their own morality. He and other buddhists encouraged this, especially in the laity that demanded a tangible goal, with the comprehensible symbolism of hell. Just as hell served as a symbol, heaven did as well and acted as a temporary imagining that one could progress beyond and achieve enlightenment. In contrast hell was utilised as a deterrent to actions that would create an opposition to enlightenment. According to Bhikkhu Anālayo, a comparative study of early Buddhist texts suggests that detailed depictions of hell realms may have emerged as an outcome of literalist readings of references originally intended in a more metaphorical sense.

If the understanding of these dates is correct then the Buddhist concept of hell predates the concept of hell in Mediterranean cultures, although these cultures communicated with each other over land and sea.

== In Theravada Buddhism ==
=== Description of hell ===
- Bālapaṇḍita Sutta (MN 129), compares the results of the actions of a fool (bāla) and a wise person (paṇḍita). Here, the Buddha gives very explicit similes of physical torture in hell, including the punishment of Pañcavidhabandhana (the piercing of five hot iron stakes).
- Devadūta Sutta (MN 130), the most comprehensive source in the Sutta Piṭaka regarding the anatomy of hell. This sutta focuses on the interrogation process by King Yama (the God of Death) of beings who during their lives ignored the five "Divine Messengers" (a baby, an old person, a sick person, a punished prisoner, and a corpse)—namely the realities of birth, aging, illness, punishment, and death. After the interrogation, this sutta comprehensively details the sentencing of the Pañcavidhabandhana punishment (the piercing of five hot iron stakes) and the stages of torture within Mahāniraya ("Great Hell") along with its immediately adjacent areas.
- Kokāliya Sutta (SN 6.10; Snp 3.10; AN 10.89), the content differs slightly because the Buddha explains the lifespan (duration) in hell using names such as Ababa, Ahaha, Kumuda, Sogandhika, Uppala, Puṇḍarīka, and Paduma. In later developments, especially in the Mahāyāna tradition, these names of time durations are often interpreted as the "Cold Hells".
- Nimi Jātaka (Ja 541), contains a description resembling a "hell tour," telling of King Nimi who was invited by the deity Mātali to see firsthand various types of specific hellish tortures based on his bad karma.

In the same way, compared to the suffering in hell, the pain and distress experienced by that man due to being struck with three hundred spears doesn’t count, it’s not worth a fraction, there’s no comparison.	Evameva kho, bhikkhave, yaṁ so puriso tīhi sattisatehi haññamāno tatonidānaṁ dukkhaṁ domanassaṁ paṭisaṁvedeti taṁ nirayakassa dukkhassa upanidhāya saṅkhampi na upeti, kalabhāgampi na upeti, upanidhampi na upeti.
— Bālapaṇḍita Sutta, MN 129 tr. Bhikkhu Sujato

In the Kathāvatthu of the Abhidhamma Piṭaka, the concept of hell is systematically structured and debated. This text represents one of the earliest religious literatures to present a fully developed conception of hell. Within it, doctrinal debates regarding the realm of hell are discussed, such as whether the torments of hell are direct results of evil deeds or merely mental manifestations of the actions themselves. Through these debates, it is maintained that hell is a state of existence experienced in the subsequent life due to the accumulation of bad actions, thereby linking hell to the concept of consequences for bad actions and the fruits of good actions.

The Niraya Vagga chapter ("Group of Verses on Hell") in the Dhammapada (Dhp 306-319), Khuddaka Nikāya also contains 14 verses about hell.

=== Causes of entering hell ===
In addition to providing descriptions of the realms, the texts in the Sutta Piṭaka also definitively define the parameters of actions that cause beings to fall into hell. These primary causes include:

- Committing the ten forms of unwholesome actions (Sāleyyaka Sutta, MN 41).
- Lacking basic virtue and holding wrong views (Jāṇussoṇī Sutta, AN 10.177).
- Committing heavy bad karma (Pali: pañcānantarika-kamma), namely: killing a parent, killing an arahat, injuring a Buddha, or creating a schism within the Sangha (Parikuppa Sutta, AN 5.129).
- Having a quarrelsome nature and being a nuisance to others (Kapila Sutta or Dhammacariya Sutta, Snp 2.6).

=== Classification of hells ===
In the Devadūta Sutta (MN 130), the Buddha described one central place of torture (mahāniraya) surrounded by immediately adjacent areas (samanantarā):

- Mahāniraya (Great Hell), the center of torture
- Samanantarā (immediately adjacent areas):
  - Gūthaniraya (Hell of Feces)
  - Kukkulaniraya (Hell of Hot Ashes)
  - Simbalivana (Forest of Simbali/Silk Cotton Trees)
  - Asipattavana (Forest of Sword Leaves)
  - Khārodakā Nadī (River of Sharp/Caustic Water)

==== Great hells ====
According to the Devadūta Sutta (MN 130), the Great Hell (Mahāniraya) is described as the primary four-gated torture structure with glowing iron walls, floor, and roof. Based on the Saṃkicca Jātaka (Ja 530), there is a systematic list of eight great hells (mahāniraya) along with specific types of torture for their inhabitants. The great hells consist of eight types:

===== 1. Sañjīva =====
Sañjīva means "reviving". In this hell, the hell wardens (nirayapāla) continuously hack and cut the inhabitants into small pieces using various fiery weapons. Despite this, they remain alive (reviving instantly) to experience the torture repeatedly until the effects of their bad karma are exhausted.

===== 2. Kāḷasutta =====
Kāḷasutta means "measuring line" commonly used by carpenters. The hell wardens lay the bodies of beings on the burning hot ground, mark them with a measuring line (black thread), and then cut the bodies using axes into eight or sixteen pieces following the lines made.

===== 3. Saṅghāta =====
Saṅghāta means "crushing together". This hell is a place for beings to be crushed and ground to dust between two giant fiery mountains colliding with each other. Massive iron rollers crush beings who are planted waist-deep into burning iron sheets nine yojanas thick. The massive iron rollers come from four directions and crush them back and forth.

===== 4. Jālarorūva =====
Jālarorūva means "screaming net". This hell is also known simply as Rorūva. Beings here are entangled in burning bronze nets and tortured with flames that enter through the nine body openings, completely burning their insides.

===== 5. Dhūmarorūva =====
Dhūmarorūva means "screaming smoke". This hell is also known as Mahārorūva. This hell is filled with deadly acrid smoke that enters through the nine body openings of its inhabitants, causing their bodies to emit steam.

===== 6. Tāpana =====
Tāpana means "roasting". Its inhabitants are impaled on iron stakes the size of palm tree trunks. The ground, stakes, and the beings there are entirely ablaze; they experience suffering in a state of forced immobility.

===== 7. Patāpana =====
Patāpana means "great roasting". This hell is also known as Mahātapana. Unlike Tāpana, beings here are forced to continuously move up a blazing fiery mountain. Once they reach the peak, winds created by the force of kamma blow them down to be impaled on rows of sharp stakes on the surface of the ground.

===== 8. Avīci =====
Avīci (or Mahāvīci) means "without interruption, without any space left" due to the fact that this hell is filled with fire, beings with bad karma, and continuous torture. This hell is the level of hell with the most severe torture. The hellfire blazes fiercely everywhere with no space between the flames. Beings inside are packed in this hell like mustard seeds in a bamboo tube. There is also no empty space between the sinners. The suffering and torture are endless, without any pause in between.

Based on the Kokālika Sutta (AN 10.89), there is a mention of ten names of hells with sequentially longer lifespans. This mention relates to the story of Kokālika, an evil-natured monk who insulted Sāriputta and Moggallāna, resulting in his rebirth in the Paduma Hell for an extremely long period. Although the Pali Canon mentions ten different names, the Manorathapūraṇī, the commentary on the Aṅguttara Nikāya, states that these names are not separate hells, but rather refer to the periods of time spent in the Avīci hell. The ten names of the hells along with their literal meanings include:

1. Abbuda Niraya ("Tumor" Hell or "Fetus" Hell).
2. Nirabbuda Niraya ("Tumor-Free" Hell)
3. Ababa Niraya ("Ababa" Hell)
4. Aṭaṭa Niraya ("Aṭaṭa" Hell)
5. Ahaha Niraya ("Ahaha" Hell)
6. Kumuda Niraya ("White Water Lily" Hell)
7. Sogandhika Niraya ("Sweet-Scented" Hell)
8. Uppalako Niraya ("Blue Lotus" Hell)
9. Puṇḍarīka Niraya ("White Lotus" Hell)
10. Paduma Niraya ("Red Lotus" Hell)

Each of these hells has a lifespan twenty times longer than the previous level. The lifespan of beings in the Paduma Hell is described as extraordinarily long, even surpassing the lifespan of a universe, according to both ancient and modern calculations.

==== Minor hells ====
===== 1. Gūthaniraya =====
Gūthaniraya means "Hell of Feces". A hell filled with rotting dung. Its area is immediately adjacent to the exit of Mahāniraya.

===== 2. Kukkulaniraya =====
Kukkula means "Hell of Hot Ashes". This hell is filled with glowing ashes. Its area is immediately adjacent to Gūthaniraya.

===== 3. Simbalivana =====
Simbalivana means "Forest of Simbali/Silk Cotton Trees". This area is filled with a forest of thorny trees, and is immediately adjacent to Kukkulaniraya.

===== 4. Asipattavana =====
Asipattavana means "Forest of Sword Leaves". This area is filled with sword-like leaves, and is immediately adjacent to Simbalivana.

===== 5. Khārodakā Nadī or Vetaraṇī =====
Khārodakā Nadī means "River of Sharp/Caustic Water". This area is filled with brine and thorny rattan, and is immediately adjacent to Asipattavana. Furthermore, in the Papañcasūdanī (the commentary for the Majjhima Nikāya), as a systematic effort to classify hells, Buddhaghosa explains that Vetaraṇī is another name for the Khārodakā Nadī area.

==== Intergalactic hell ====
The Theravāda commentaries introduce the term "intergalactic hell" (Pali: lokantarika-niraya). Intergalactic hell is "the space at the meeting of three world-systems; it is the space where evil doers suffer for their misdeeds." This hell is defined in the following way:

When three universes meet, there is space where Lokantarika hell exists, where neither sunray nor moonbeam can reach. Complete darkness reigns there. Those who insulted and ridiculed noble and virtuous persons become petas or asura-kayas and suffer from hunger in this hell. They cling to the walls of the universe in complete darkness. They mistake the other sinner to be some food, and try to bite each other. On doing so, they fall down into the icy water and perish.

==== Other hells ====
===== Lohakumbhī =====
Lohakumbhī is a specific hell realm characterized by hot molten metal, and is located below the earth's crust near human dwellings (specifically near Rājagaha).

== In Mahayana Buddhism ==
=== Descriptions of Narakas ===
There are several schemes for counting these narakas and enumerating their torments. Some sources describe five hundred or even hundreds of thousands of different narakas. One of the most common scheme is that of the Eight Great Hot Narakas and Eight Great Cold Narakas. Physically, Naraka is thought of as a series of layers extending below Jambudvīpa. There are also series of isolated and boundary hells called Pratyeka naraka (Pali: Pacceka-niraya) and Lokantarikas.

The sufferings of the dwellers in naraka often resemble those of the pretas, and the two types of being are easily confused. The simplest distinction is that beings in Naraka are confined to their subterranean world, while the pretas are free to move about.

As for how beings come into hell, they are not born in these naraka but appear by means of manifestation (Upapāta उपपात) as adults under the influence of the karmic force. The bodies they are manifested in are made of resilient matter that can withstand even the most extreme pain. In some texts, it is reported that the bodies are large to extend the suffering.

=== Eight Hot Narakas ===
The Uṣṇanaraka (Sanskrit: उष्णनरक, lit. 'Hot Hells'), also called Eight Hot Hells (Chinese: 八熱地獄; pinyin: Bārè Dìyù; Japanese: 八熱地獄, romanized: Hachinetsu Jigoku) or Eight Great/Major Hells (Chinese: 八大地獄; pinyin: Bādà Dìyù; Japanese: 八大地獄, romanized: Hachidai Jigoku), are described below.

==== Hells for committers of "physical" crimes ====
===== 1. Sañjīva =====
Sañjīva (Sanskrit: नरक; Chinese: 等活地獄; pinyin: Děnghuó Dìyù; Japanese: 等活地獄, romanized: Tōkatsu Jigoku), the "Reviving" Naraka, has ground made of hot iron heated by an immense fire. This is the designated realm for those who commit acts of violence and murder with the clear intent of killing living beings, out of a desire to destroy their source of life. Beings in this naraka appear fully grown, already in a state of fear and misery. As soon as the being begins to fear being harmed by others, their fellows appear and attack each other with iron claws, and hell guards appear and attack the being with fiery weapons. As soon as the being experiences an unconsciousness like death, they are suddenly restored to full health as a cold wind revives them and the attacks begin anew. This circle of torture continues until their bad karma is exhausted. Other tortures experienced in this Naraka include: having molten metal dropped upon them, being sliced into pieces, and suffering from the heat of the iron ground by the hell wardens.

Killing that is purely accidental does not lead to this hell. Examples of killing that does not lead to this hell include: accidental crushing of an insect, killing while driving a stake to the ground, a doctor attempting to treat the sick but involuntarily killing his patient, a parent who tries to correct their child's behavior and accidentally kills them, and when a flame attracts an insect to its destruction. Consuming meat is also not an act of bad karma in the circumstances that the individual did not see or hear the killing of the animal or let the animal be killed specifically for them. This hell should make the practitioners aware of their dependence upon sentient life around them. The purpose is to discourage unnecessary suffering of animals but not totally prohibit the consumption of meat.

It is said to be 1,000 yojanas beneath Jambudvīpa and 10,000 yojanas in each direction.

The saddharmasmṛtyupasthānasūtra ("Sutra of the Right Mindfulness") names sixteen subsidiary hells to this one and discusses seven of them in detail. The subsidiary hells are: the Region of the Mud Excrement, which is full of boiling excrements and insects; the Region of the Wheel of Swords, where iron falls from the sky like rain and is covered in a forest of swords; the Region of the Roasting Skillet, where people who roasted animals will have the same done to them; the Region of Numerous Sufferings; the Region of Darkness, which is a dark space and the people there are burned by opaque fire while a fiery wind blows that tears their skin; the Region of Unhappiness, where great fires burn and while the residents are devoured by animals; and finally the Region of Extreme Suffering, where lazy people who committed murder burn.

===== 2. Kālasūtra =====
Kālasūtra (Sanskrit: कालसूत्र; Chinese: 黑繩地獄; pinyin: Hēishéng Dìyù; Japanese: 黒縄地獄, romanized: Kokujō Jigoku), the "Black Thread" Naraka, includes the torments of Sañjīva. The pains experienced in this hell are ten times more severe than those suffered in Sañjīva. In addition, black lines are drawn upon the body, which hell guards use as guides to cut the beings with fiery saws and sharp axes. A second version of this hell describes it as a place where black ropes are stretched across the mountains and hot cauldrons are placed underneath. The wardens of this hell force the dwellers to carry heavy iron bundles and walk across the rope until they fall into the cauldrons below. This is the place for those who have committed murder, robbery, or lied, as well as those who were bad sons or two-faced women.

This naraka includes places such as the Chandala hell for those who steal from the sick or take objects that they are not worthy of using. They are tormented by giant evil birds that disembowel them. Other punishments include being forced to eat molten copper and being pierced by spears.

Genshin describes the subsidiary hells within this region in more detail. One example is the Region of Equal Wailing and Reception of Suffering, where the inmates tied to black ropes that are on fire and fall into swords below. Hounds with hot fangs then proceed to take the bodies apart.

===== 3. Saṃghāta =====
Saṃghāta (Sanskrit: संघात; Chinese: 眾合地獄; pinyin: Zhònghé Dìyù; Japanese: 衆合地獄, romanized: Shugō Jigoku), the "Crushing" Naraka, is surrounded by huge masses of rock that smash together and crush beings into a bloody jelly. When the rocks move apart again, life is restored to the being, and the process starts again. Within this naraka corpses are eaten by demons, bears, and birds. Eagles with flaming beaks tear out their organs. The saddharmasmṛtyupasthānasūtra provides another depiction of this hell. The wardens then continue hang them on hooks.

The rebirth into this hell is caused by the improper attitude toward love and sexual indulgence combined with acts of murder. The residents of this hell are firstly brought to a beautiful woman who reminds them of the woman they once loved sitting upon a tree and who beckons them to climb up. While climbing, hot sword-leaves slice into the body, but the inmate is filled with so much desire that they reach the top, discovering that the woman is below the tree beckoning them down. This is repeated and the prisoner spends hundreds of thousands of years in this cycle. This represents the people who stay ignorant in life possess ego-centric love, as they have no awareness of being in their own hell of self-deception. They blame their suffering upon their circumstances instead of taking a look at their own prisoned mind.

The first subsidiary hell, the Region of Evil Views, is described by Genshin as a place for those who have molested children. Those who end up in this hell are forced to watch their children being stabbed by the hell wardens. While this happens they experience unspeakable suffering as they are hung down and molten copper is poured into their bodies through the anus. Another hell is the Region of Suffering Enduring. Men who kidnap the women of others are hung upside down from a tree and roasted under a fire that enters their mouths and burns their insides as they try to scream. Another hell is the Region of Many Suffering and Anguish where men who committed homosexual rape are reborn. These men are embraced by figures of the people who they molested. After being incinerated in this manner, they revive and in fear they attempt to flee just to fall off a cliff, ending up being consumed by birds with flaming beaks and foxes.

===== 4. Raurava =====
Raurava (Sanskrit: रौरव; Chinese: 叫喚地獄; pinyin: Jiàohuàn Dìyù; Japanese: 叫喚地獄, romanized: Kyōkan Jigoku), the "Screaming" Naraka, is where screaming beings run wildly about, looking for refuge from the burning ground as they are scorched by the blazing fires. Other descriptions of this hell include that the prisoners beg the hell wardens, that are gold and have long legs that enable them to run as quickly as the wind, for mercy hearing the voices of the dreadful demons. This increases the anger of these demons and they pry open the mouths of the prisoners with pincers to pour molten copper into it that destroys their organs.

The primary reason for being reborn into this realm of hell is the improper intake and use of intoxicants in combination with acts of killing, stealing, and sexual indulgence. The sixteen subsidiary hells to this Raurava naraka enumerate a number of cases which involve the giving of alcohol to monks with the purpose of irritating them, the use of intoxicants as a means of seduction, the addition of water to alcohol by merchants with the intention of gaining extra money, the provision of animals with liquor, or the utilisation of alcohol in order to kill or rob others. Nevertheless, the consumption of alcohol is only prohibited to the extent that it impedes the proper practice of morality. This hell may be associated with the consumption of alcohol, yet it never condemns the individual who drinks alone or with the company of friends. However, the descriptions of this hell include references to the negative effects of alcohol, such as its detrimental impact on the body and irritating effects on the mind, advising abstinence from liquor.

==== Hells for committers of "vocal" crimes ====
===== 5. Mahāraurava =====
Mahāraurava (Sanskrit: महारौरव; Chinese: 大叫喚地獄; pinyin: Dàjiàohuàn Dìyù; Japanese: 大叫喚地獄, romanized: Daikyōkan Jigoku), the "Great Screaming" Naraka, is similar to Raurava. The primary causes of this hell are lying and the deployment of inappropriate words in conjunction with the transgressions outlined in the former naraka. This is the initial hell in which the psychological state is of greater consequence than the physical condition in regard to the misdeed. In the minor Hell of Unbearable Pain, those who committed perjury or bribery are tormented by having snakes be born inside their bodies. Each lie creates more snakes as they represent the inner fears like inadequacy, loss of possessions, and so on that are perpetuated by further lies. While there is no clear differentiation between truth and falsehood in Buddhism, that does not mean that an individual should deliberately deceive others.

Subsidiary hells include the Region for Receiving the Suffering of Being Stabbed by a Spearhead, where hot iron needles are thrust into the mouths and tongues of the inmates. In the Region Where One Receives Limitless Suffering, wardens pull out tongues with hot iron pincers.

==== Hells for committers of "mental" crimes ====
===== 6. Tapana =====
Tapana (Sanskrit: तपन; Chinese: 焦熱／炎熱地獄; pinyin: Jiāorè/Yánrè Dìyù; Japanese: 焦熱／炎熱地獄, romanized: Shōnetsu/Ennetsu Jigoku), the "Heating" Naraka, is where hell wardens impale the residents on a fiery spear until flames issue from their noses and mouths. Furthermore, they are thrown onto a burning iron surface and are beaten by the wardens until they have been reduced to a mound of flesh or are fried in a skillet. They are impaled from the buttock to the head on a spit and roasted, burning until the flames pierce their bones and marrow. Compared to the flames of this hell, the flames of the former naraka feel like snow to the inmates.

As the first hell, purely related to mental actions, it addresses the major obstacles to enlightenment. These obstacles include the rejection of the laws of karma and the existence of good and evil, which the historical Buddha considered to be bad for people to take personal responsibility. The key to enlightenment lies within the human mind and in case that mind deceives itself, the possibility of enlightenment vanishes.

One of the places in this hell is the pundarika Region, in which everyone is engulfed in flames. A voice beckons them to come closer and drink from a lake of lotus blossoms (pundarika). They follow the voice and fall into holes engulfed in flames that incinerate their bodies. The bodies are revived but burn soon again as this circle continues. Nevertheless, they repeat their attempt of finding the lotus lake to quench their thirst. People who starved themselves in hope of reaching heaven and people who led others to believe in heterodox views will be found in this hell.

A second place is the Region of Dark Fire Wind. The people here are imprisoned in a whirlwind which causes them to tumble around in circles. They are tossed around by a wind that strikes their body as sharply as a sword and cuts it into little pieces. Afterward they are revived and this is repeated. In this hell is the belief that things can be classified into permanent and impermanent.

These hells showcase that while Buddhism had tolerance for other religions, some sutras clearly condemn beliefs and practices that are different from what the historical Buddha taught.

===== 7. Pratāpana =====
Pratāpana (Sanskrit: प्रतापन; Chinese: 大焦熱／大炎熱／極熱地獄; pinyin: Dàjiāorè/Dàyánrè/Jírè Dìyù; Japanese: 大焦熱／大炎熱／極熱地獄, romanized: Daishōnetsu/Daiennetsu/Gokunetsu Jigoku), the "Great Heating" Naraka, is where demons with black bellies, flaming eyes, and hooked teeth haunt the ones reborn, grabbing the residents by the throat and dragging them through mountains and cities and across oceans. Genshin describes when reaching the entrance to this hell they are insulted by Yama for the sins they committed in their former existence. Being imprisoned in the ropes of their bad karma, they enter the Pratāpana naraka. The hell is totally engulfed by fire and wailing of other beings. The flames of this naraka are the individuals' own bad karma which makes them suffer.

This hell destines those who have sexually defiled religion to torture. This defilement includes seducing monks, nuns, and virtuous laywomen. Those who seduce laywomen are made to suffer within the Hell of String-like Worms by being tied and laid down on a blazing floor on which iron hooks are attached. As they cry out in agony the hell wardens put bow-string shaped worms inside the sinner's body. This worm burns the inside of their body and devours the innards while it excretes poison that causes excruciating pain. After this procedure it cracks open a hole in the body and slithers out.

Another hell that can be found here is the Place of Painful Hair, which contains women who have attempted to beguile monks into sexual temptation. Such women are made to suffer by having their skin pared off by hell wardens until only her bones remain. The skin recovers again and this is repeated. Sometimes the wardens peel only peel off small parts and then roast them. Fleeing from this torture they run into the hands of the monk who they seduced and their vision transforms into a searing flame. It is almost impossible that such a woman can be reborn as a human again, however, if she is reborn as a human she will end up ugly and disabled, forced to clean excrement and be beaten by even her own children.

===== 8. Avīci =====
Avīci (Sanskrit: अवीचि; Chinese: 無間／阿鼻地獄; pinyin: Wújiàn/Ābí Dìyù; Japanese: 無間／阿鼻地獄, romanized: Mugen/Abi Jigoku), the "Uninterrupted" Naraka, is deepest of the Eight Hot Hells. Beings are roasted in an immense blazing oven with terrible suffering. The Avici naraka is located at the bottom of the Realm of Desire and as the ones are in states between rebirths and destinied to go into this hell, they cry out:

There is nothing but flames.
They fill the sky and there is no space (between the flames).
In the four directions, in the four intermediate directions
And on the ground, there is no place which is free (of flames).
Every place on the ground is filled with evil people.
I can't rely on anything.
I am alone, with no companion.
I am within the darkness of this evil realm
And will (soon) enter the mass of flames.
In the sky, I can
See neither the sun, the moon nor the stars.

Until they reach the Avici hell, they will fall for two thousand years in an upside-down posture, as it symbolises their own reversed views (viparyāsa).

The sufferings in these hells are considered to be a thousand times more extreme than the ones encountered in the former hells, making the inhabitants of the former hells seem as happy as the most blessed deva. Every sinner's odor smells like foul stench and the sounds of this naraka would make those who hear it die of terror. The Avici Hell is surrounded by seven iron walls and nets, and in each corner a huge bronze dog with eyes like lightning, fangs like swords, and teeth like mountain knives is positioned. Below there are eighteen forests with sharp leaves. There are seven walls and banners from which flames are shot out within the hell. Moreover, placed here are eighteen cauldrons from which molten bronze flows and there are snakes that spit venom and fire everywhere. The sounds that they make are said to be like a hundred thousand thunder strikes that attract iron balls from the sky. Other animals that reside here are worms that spew fire.

Another description of this hell is that there are flames everywhere that pierce, burn, sever the tendons, and crack the bodies of those residing there. There is nothing but flames and the only signal that there are beings existing within it are the screams. All beings are forced to climb up a scorching-hot iron mountain. Additional sufferings consist of pulling out the tongues and letting them swallow an iron ball and molten bronze while forcing the mouth open with pincers. This results in their throat and viscera being burned.

In his Ōjōyōshū Genshin describes a couple of subsidiary hells to this one, starting with the depiction of the Region where Iron Foxes are Fed. All beings here are on fire. On top of that, iron tiles rain from the sky in a thunderstorm, crushing everything below. Foxes with scorching teeth make their way to the crushed bodies and feast on them. All those who have damaged Buddhist properties by setting them on fire will be punished in this hell. In the Region of the Black Belly, all beings are consumed by their own hunger to the extent of being forced to eat their own flesh. Black-bellied snakes attack them here as well. Those who have eaten the things offered to Buddha will suffer in this place. Another place is the Region Where Iron Mountains Fall like Rain. In this place, falling iron mountains crush the bodies of sinners into lumps of flesh. There are eleven fires in the shape of towers that burn anyone who comes close and wardens with swords that slash sinners in this region while they put molten pewter into the wounds. Those who stole and ate the food of pratyekabuddha are destined to go here. The next subsidiary hell is the Region of the Bird, which is inhabited by a bird as big as an elephant that has a sharp fire-spewing beak. It grabs the ones in this region and drops them from the sky, leaving them shattered on the ground. The roads have knives that stick out and pierce the ones walking on them. Additionally, they are attacked by dogs with fangs on fire.

This hell is the destined place for those who have committed one of the Five Great Offenses of Buddhism (Anantarika-karma) that include the murder of one's biological mother or father, evil intention of causing harm to the Buddha or the Buddhist community and the murder of Arhats. To be worthy of the Avici hell, these sins need to be carried out with deliberate intentions as they have consciously ignored the good within themselves and are fully aware of their sin. This sin also consists of taking away the chance of others to reach enlightenment and destroying part of oneself under the working of the Dependent Origination (Pratītyasamutpāda).

=== Eight Cold Narakas ===
The Śītanaraka (Sanskrit: शीतनरक, lit. 'Cold Hells'), also called Eight Cold Hells (Chinese: 八寒地獄; pinyin: Bāhán Dìyù; Japanese: 八寒地獄, romanized: Hakkan Jigoku) and said to be located on one Cakkavāla in Buddhist sutras, are where resident sinners are tormented with unbearable cold. The first four names reflect the cries uttered by sufferers in these hells because of the intolerable cold. The latter four hells are named for the changes one's flesh is said to undergo when exposed to the intense cold there. For instance, in the hell of the "Crimson Lotus" the cold is said to be so severe, one's back breaks open and bloody flesh emerges, resembling a crimson lotus flower.

The Dharma Analysis Treasury describes the Eight Cold Hells as:

1. Arbuda (Sanskrit: अर्बुद; Chinese: 頞部陀; pinyin: Èbùtuó; Japanese: 頞部陀(あぶだ); rōmaji: Abuda), the Hell of Blisters, is a dark, frozen plain surrounded by icy mountains and continually swept by blizzards. Inhabitants of this world arise fully grown and abide lifelong naked and alone, while the cold raises blisters upon their bodies. The length of life in this naraka is said to be the time it would take to empty a barrel of sesame seeds if one only took out a single seed every hundred years.
2. Nirarbuda (Sanskrit: अर्बुद; Chinese: 尼刺部陀; pinyin: Nícìbùtuó; Japanese: 尼剌部陀(にらぶだ); rōmaji: Nirabuda), the Hell of Bursting Blisters, is even colder than Arbuda. There, the blisters burst open, leaving the beings' bodies covered with frozen blood and pus.
3. Aṭaṭa (Sanskrit: अटट; Chinese: 頞唽吒; pinyin: Èxīzhā; Japanese: 頞哳吒(あたた); rōmaji: Atata) is the Hell of Shivering/Chattering Teeth. There, beings shiver in the cold while their teeth chatter, making an aṭ-aṭ-aṭ sound with their mouths.
4. Hahava (Sanskrit: हहव; Chinese: 臛臛婆; pinyin: Huòhuòpó; Japanese: 臛臛婆(かかば); rōmaji: Kakaba) is the Hell of Lamentation. There, the beings lament in the cold, going haa, haa in pain.
5. Huhuva (Sanskrit: हुहुव; Chinese: 虎虎婆; pinyin: Hǔhǔpó; Japanese: 虎虎婆(ここば); rōmaji: Kokoba), the Hell of Groaning, is where beings groan from the pain, making the sound hu, hu.
6. Utpala (Sanskrit: उत्पल; Chinese: 嗢鉢羅; pinyin: Wàbōluó; Japanese: 嗢鉢羅(うばら); rōmaji: Ubara) is the Blue Lotus Hell. The intense cold there makes the skin turn blue like the color of an utpala water-lily.
7. Padma (Sanskrit: पद्म; Chinese: 鉢特摩; pinyin: Bōtèmó; Japanese: 鉢特摩(はどま); rōmaji: Hadoma) is the Crimson Lotus Hell (Chinese: 紅蓮地獄; pinyin: Hónglián Dìyù; Japanese: 紅蓮(ぐれん)地獄; rōmaji: Guren Jigoku). Here blizzards rage that crack open frozen skin, leaving one raw and bloody.
8. Mahāpadma (Sanskrit: महापद्म; Chinese: 摩訶鉢特摩; pinyin: Móhēbōtèmó; Japanese: 摩訶鉢特摩(まかはどま); rōmaji: Makahadoma) is the Great Crimson Lotus Hell (Chinese: 大紅蓮地獄; pinyin: Dàhónglián Dìyù; Japanese: 大紅蓮(だいぐれん)地獄; rōmaji: Daiguren Jigoku). The entire body cracks into pieces and the internal organs are exposed to the cold, also cracking.

According to the Mahāyāna Mahāparinirvāṇa Sūtra, the eight hells are:

1. the Hahava hell,
2. the Aṭaṭa hell,
3. the Alalā hell,
4. the Ababa hell,
5. the Utpala hell (the hell of the Blue Lotus),
6. the Padma hell (the hell of the Crimson Lotus),
7. the Kumuda hell (the hell of the Scarlet Lotus),
8. the Pundarīka (the hell of the White Lotus).

In the first hell, the intense cold produces chilblains all over one's body. In the second hell, one's chilblains worsen and finally burst. The following three hells are named for the shrieks of sufferers who inhabit them. In the sixth hell, one's flesh turns blue from the intense cold. In the last two hells, the cold makes one's flesh crack open, resembling a crimson lotus.

=== In Mahayana Buddhist literature ===
The Dīrghāgama or Longer Āgama-sūtra (Chinese: 長阿含經; pinyin: cháng āhán jīng), was translated to Chinese in 22 fascicles from an Indic original by Zhu Fonian (竺佛念) in 412–13 CE based on a text read out by Buddhayaśas (Chinese: 佛陀耶舍; pinyin: Fótuóyéshě). This literature contains 30 discrete scriptures in four groups (vargas). The fourth varga, which pertains to Buddhist cosmology and according to Bhikkhu Anālayo may be a later addition to the collection, contains a "Chapter on Hell" (地獄品; dìyù pǐn) within the Scripture of the Account of the World (世記經; shìjì jīng). In this text, the Buddha describes to the sangha each of the hells in great detail, beginning with their physical location and names:

佛告比丘: 「此四天下有八千天下圍遶其外。復有大海水周匝圍遶八千天下。復有大金剛山遶大海水。金剛山外復有第二大金剛山。二山中間窈窈冥冥。日月神天有大威力。不能以光照及於彼。彼有八大地獄。其一地獄有十六小地獄。第一大地獄名想。第二名黑繩。第三名堆壓。第四名叫喚。第五名大叫喚。第六名燒炙。第七名大燒炙。第八名無間。其想地獄有十六小獄。小獄縱廣五百由旬。第一小獄名曰黑沙。二名沸屎。三名五百丁。四名飢。五名渴。六名一銅釜。七名多銅釜。八名石磨。九名膿血。十名量火。十一名灰河。十二名鐵丸。十三名釿斧。十四名犲狼。十五名劍樹。十六名寒氷。」

The Buddha told the bhikṣus, there are 8,000 continents surrounding the four continents [on earth]. There is, moreover, a great sea surrounding those 8,000 continents. There is, moreover, a great diamond mountain range encircling that great sea. Beyond this great diamond mountain range is yet another great diamond mountain range. And between the two mountain ranges lies darkness. The sun and moon in the divine sky with their great power are unable to reach that [darkness] with their light. In [that space between the two diamond mountain ranges] there are eight major hells. Along with each major hell are sixteen smaller hells.

The first major hell is called Thoughts. The second is called Black Rope. The third is called Crushing. The fourth is called Moaning. The fifth is called Great Moaning. The sixth is called Burning. The seventh is called Great Burning. The eighth is called Unremitting. The Hell of Thoughts contains sixteen smaller hells. The smaller hells are 500 square yojana in area. The first small hell is called Black Sand. The second hell is called Boiling Excrement. The third is called Five Hundred Nails. The fourth is called Hunger. The fifth is called Thirst. The sixth is called Single Copper Cauldron. The seventh is called Many Copper Cauldrons. The eighth is called Stone Pestle. The ninth is called Pus and Blood. The tenth is called Measuring Fire. The eleventh is called Ash River. The twelfth is called Iron Pellets. The thirteenth is called Axes and Hatchets. The fourteenth is called Jackals and Wolves. The fifteenth is called Sword Cuts. The sixteenth is called Cold and Ice.

Further evidence supporting the importance of these texts discussing hells lies in Buddhists' further investigation of the nature of hell and its denizens. Buddhavarman's fifth-century Chinese translation of the Abhidharma-vibhāṣā-śāstra (Chinese: 阿毘曇毘婆沙論; pinyin: āpídámó pípóshā lùn) questions whether hell wardens who torture hell beings are themselves sentient beings, what form they take, and what language they speak. The Abhidharma-kosa (Treasure House of Higher Knowledge) is the root text that describes the most common scheme, as the Eight Cold Narakas and Eight Hot Narakas. The translation of it by Xuanzang's 玄奘 seventh-century Chinese is also concerned with whether hell wardens are sentient beings, as well as how they go on to receive karmic retribution, whether they create bad karma at all, and why are they not physically affected and burned by the fires of hell.

Descriptions of the naraka are a common subject in some forms of Buddhist commentary and popular literature as cautionary tales against the fate that befalls evildoers and an encouragement to virtue.

The Mahāyāna sūtra of the Bodhisattva Kṣitigarbha (Dìzàng or Jizō) graphically describes the sufferings in naraka and explains how ordinary people can transfer merit in order to relieve the sufferings of the beings there. One example being Kṣitigarbha statues that are supposed to shorten the period of time children have to endure the suffering in the underworld.

Genshin, a monk of the Pure Land Buddhism, began his Ōjōyōshū with a description of the suffering within the eight hot naraka. It is a seminal work within the Pure Land Buddhism movement and outlines some thoughts in regard to the cosmology and practice. Genshin assumes the general Buddhist position that life within the Six Paths is characterised by duḥkha and should thus be rejected. The purpose of his descriptions of the extreme suffering in Naraka could be to convince people of the teachings and practices of Pure Land Buddhism and stop their clinging onto the transmigratory existence in saṃsāra. Tibetan Lamrim texts also included a similar description.

Chinese Buddhist texts considerably enlarged upon the description of naraka (Diyu), detailing additional Narakas and their punishments, and expanding the role of Yama and his helpers, Ox-Head and Horse-Face. In these texts, Naraka became an integral part of the otherworldly bureaucracy which mirrored the imperial Chinese administration.

=== Butsumyōe ceremony ===
Butsumyōe 仏名会 is a three day long ceremony for repentance. It was an annual event in Japan from 830 to 838. The names of the Buddhas of the three ages were chanted in order to repent for the misdeeds committed during that year. Imagery of Buddhist hell was used in form of paintings (jigoku-e 地獄絵). They were utilised to arouse mercy for the sinners who have fallen into hell.

The Kurōdo-shiki 蔵人式 (894), Eiga-monogatari (1028–1107) and Makura-sōshi (1102) contain descriptions of a hell screen testifying their widespread usage in the Butsumyōe. These motifs of naraka were most likely based on artworks of the Nara period and not, as it is often argued for, the Ōjōyōshū.

=== Exhibition of the Eighteen Hells in Madou Daitian Temple (麻豆代天府 十八層地獄) ===
The Madou Daitian Temple in Taiwan exhibits a depiction of the Eighteen Hells as imagined in Buddhism. Those who fall into this hell are depicted in handcuffs as they receive their punishments. These depicted punishments include sawed to pieces by the hell wardens, being attacked by animals, or falling into the Hell of the Blood Pond.

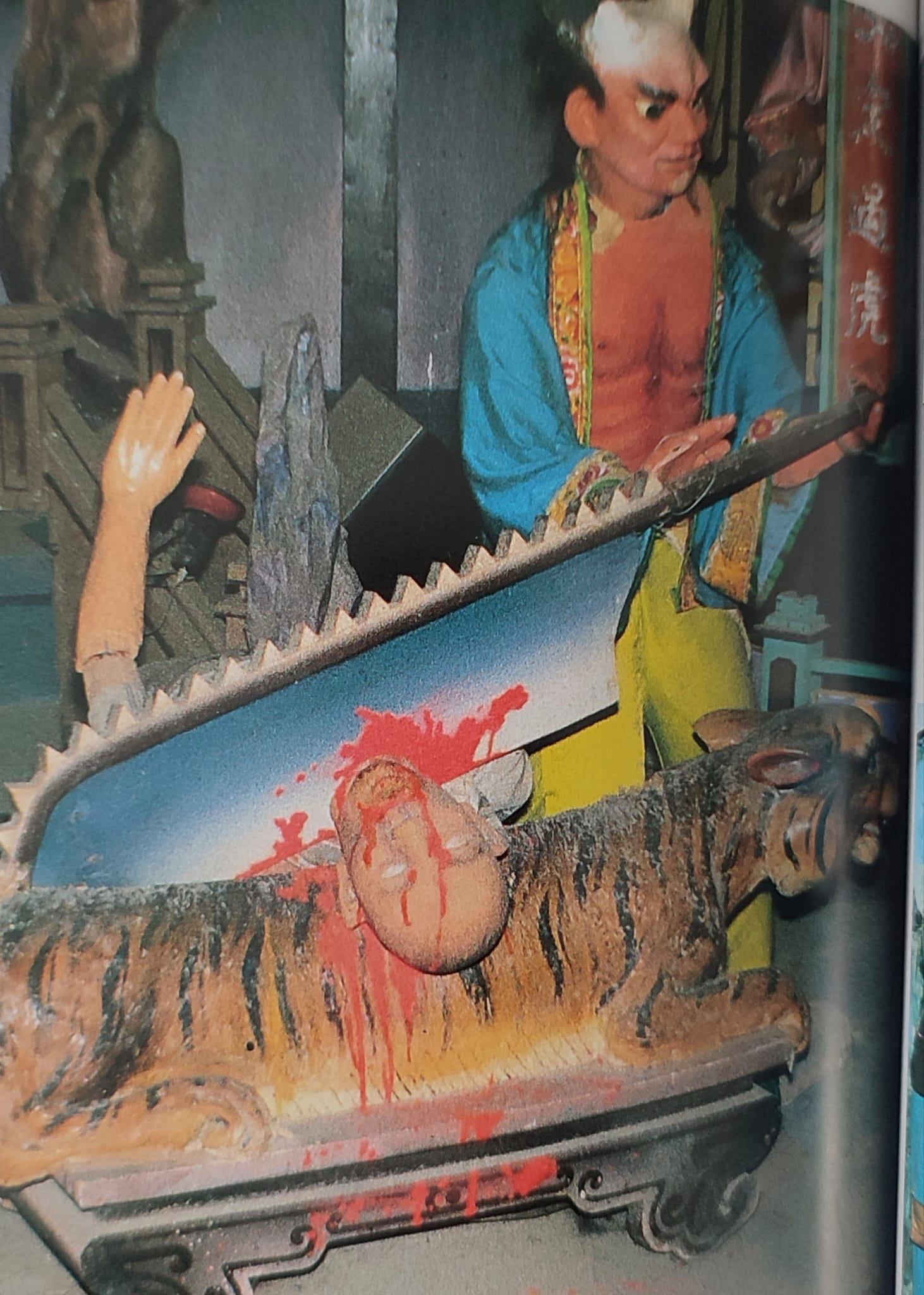
A hell warden sawing a hell inhabitant into pieces

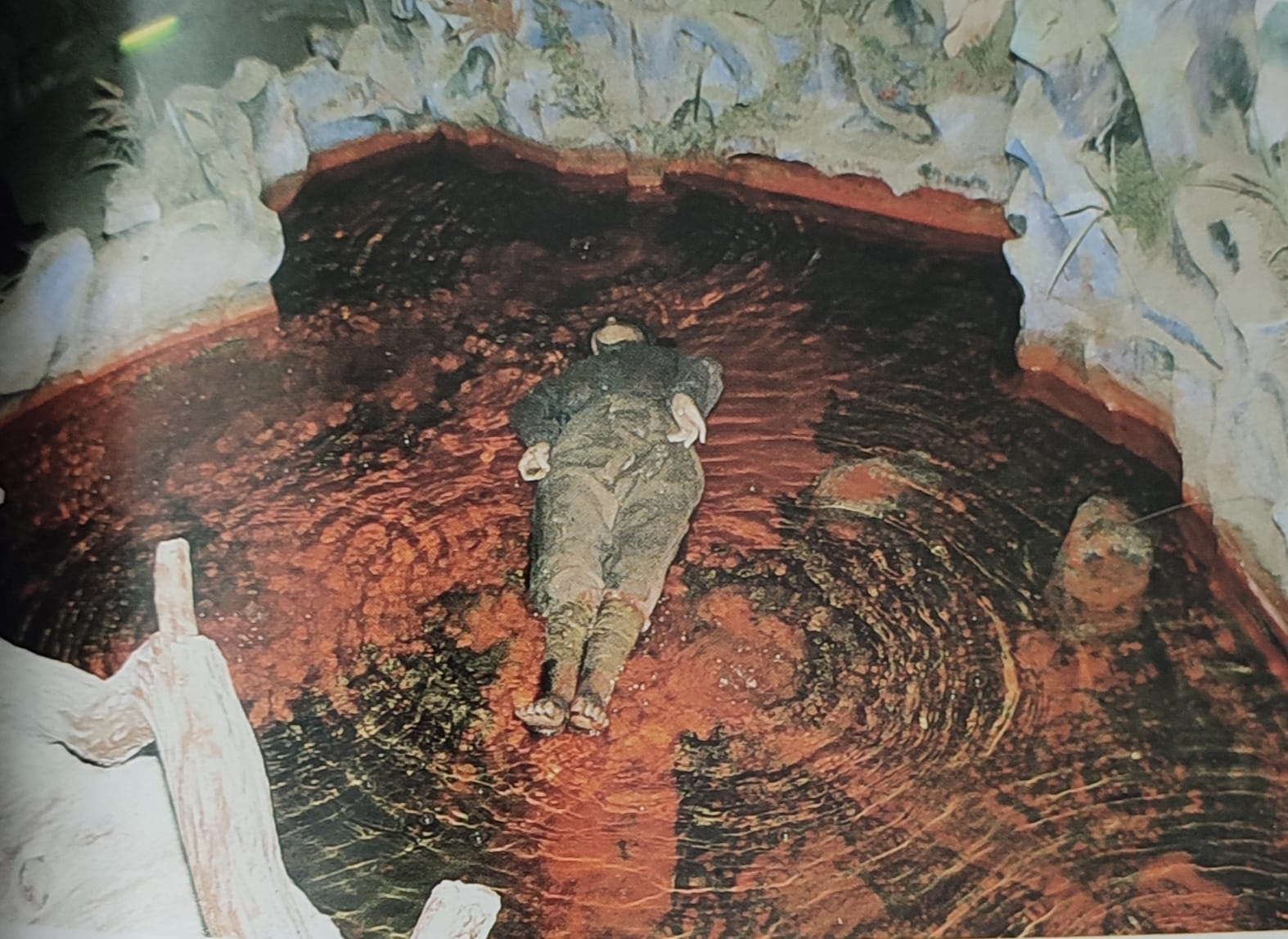
Blood Pond of Hell in the Exhibition of the Eighteen Hells in the Mantontaichienfu (麻豆代天府 十八層地獄)

=== Interpretation of the concept of hell ===
Matsunaga argues that the concept of Naraka was created to move people in the period these concepts were created toward action in their daily lives that would lead toward enlightenment. The naraka do not give a specific outline of moral behavior that leads to enlightenment, however, it acted as a guideline for it. Otherwise, Matsunaga states, the individual would be deprived of their own responsibility. Each individual has to walk their own path which is depended on time, place, and their karma from past actions. Buddhism advocates that people have the ability to create themselves and therefore mold their own heaven and hells.

== Gallery ==
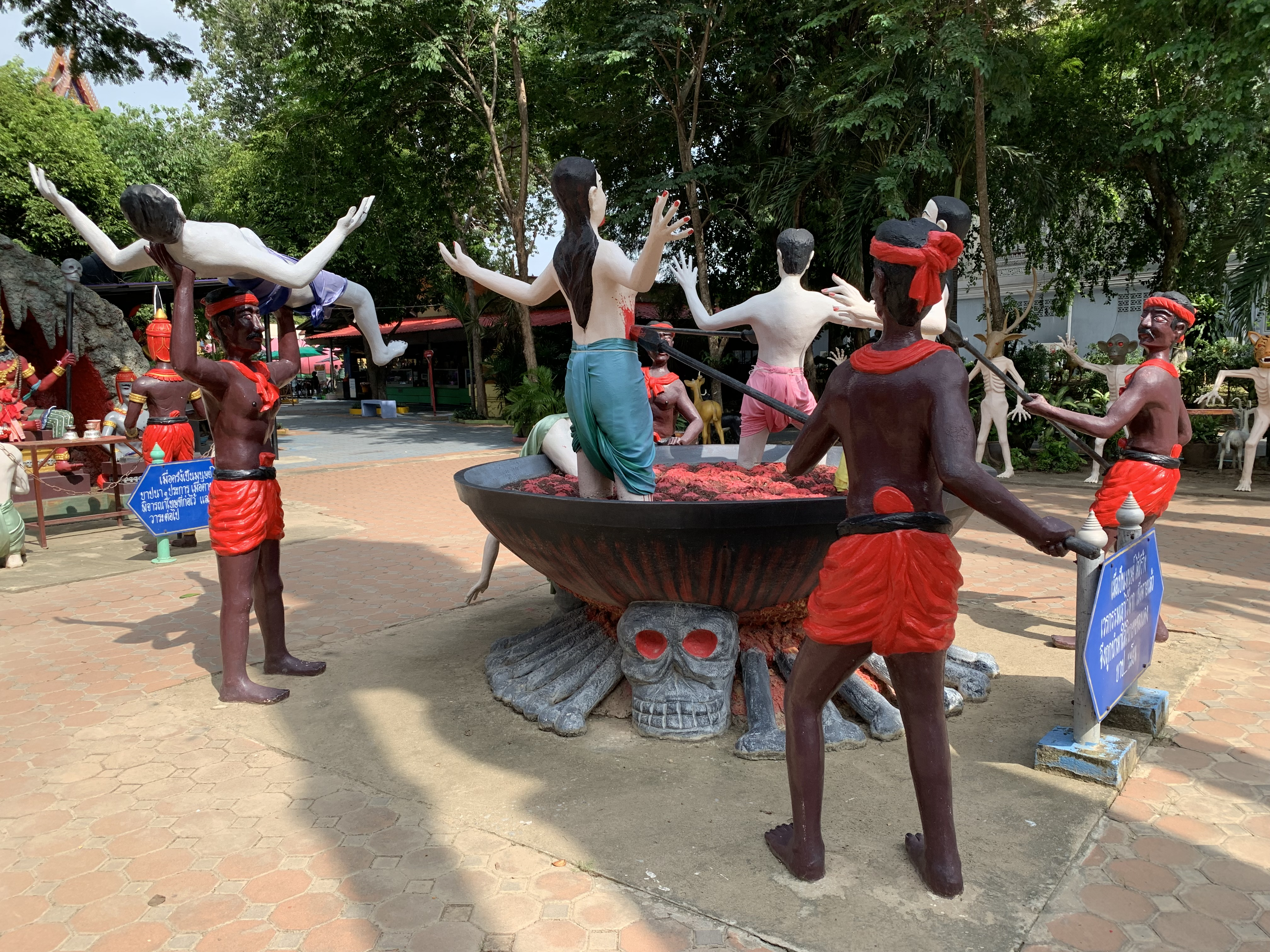
A scene of punishment with boiling, at a hell scenery in Wat Muang, Thailand

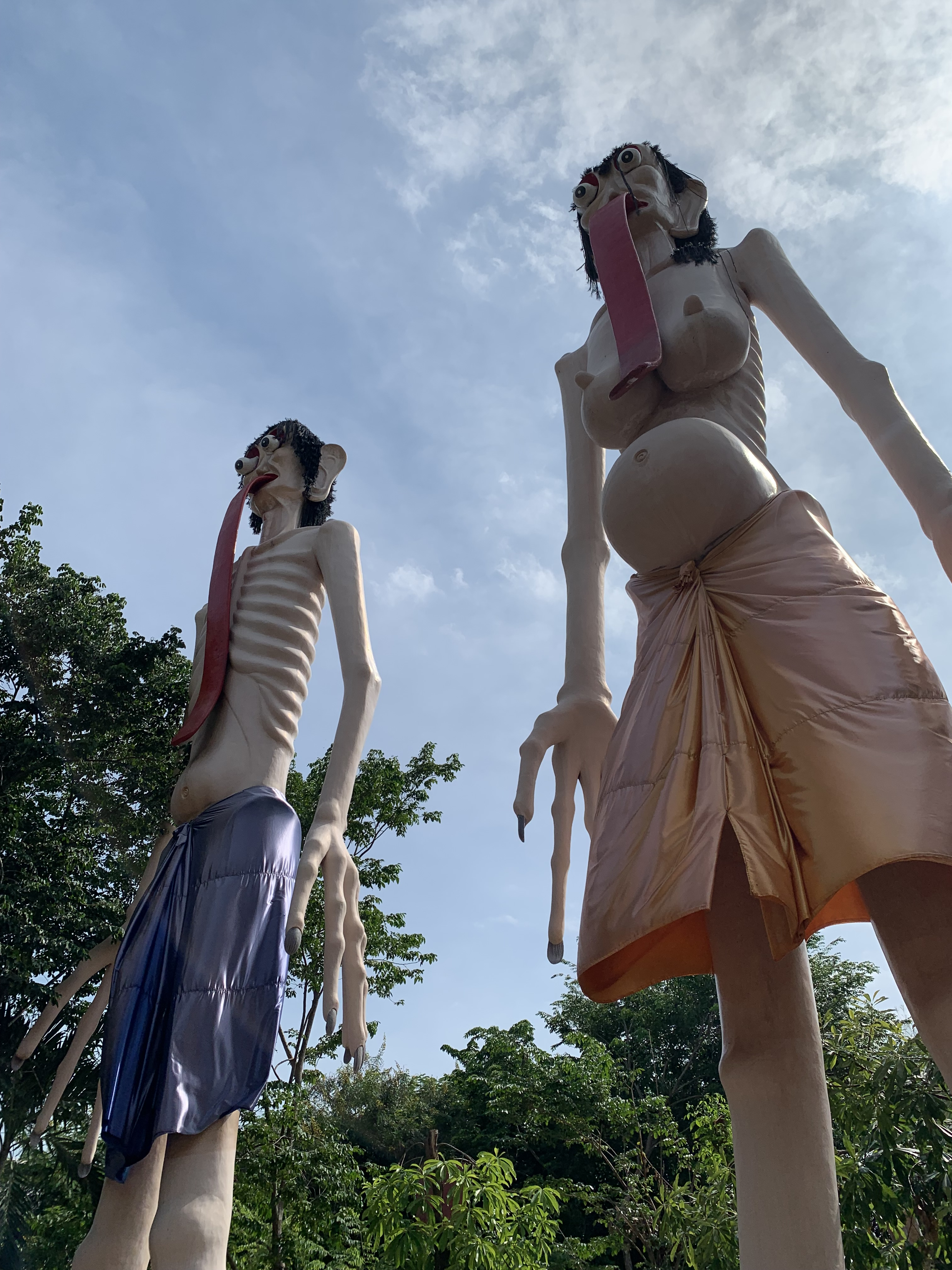
Large statues of pretas, at a hell scenery in Wat Muang, Thailand

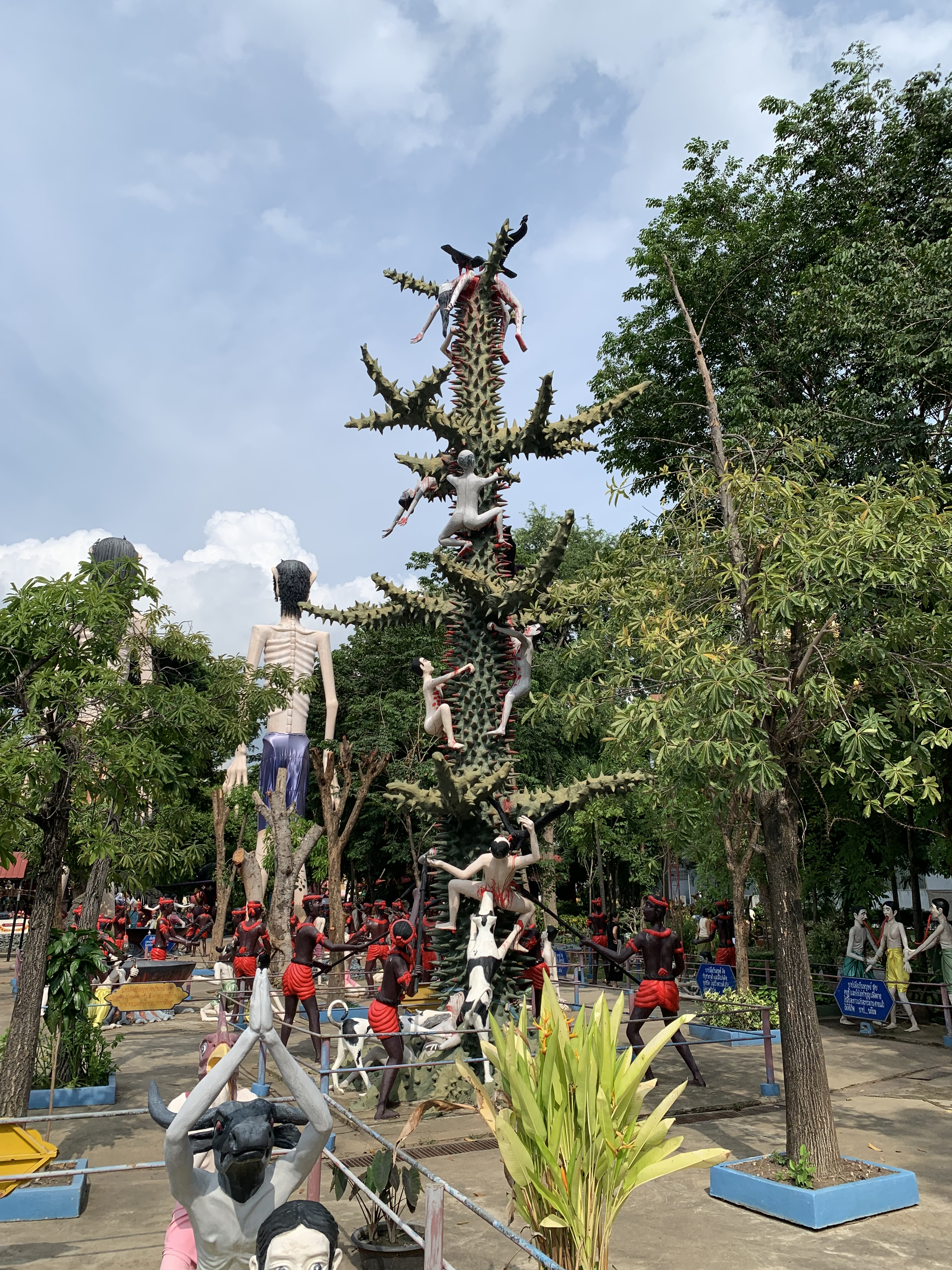
Thorn tree with climbing it as a punishment, at a hell scenery in Wat Muang, Thailand

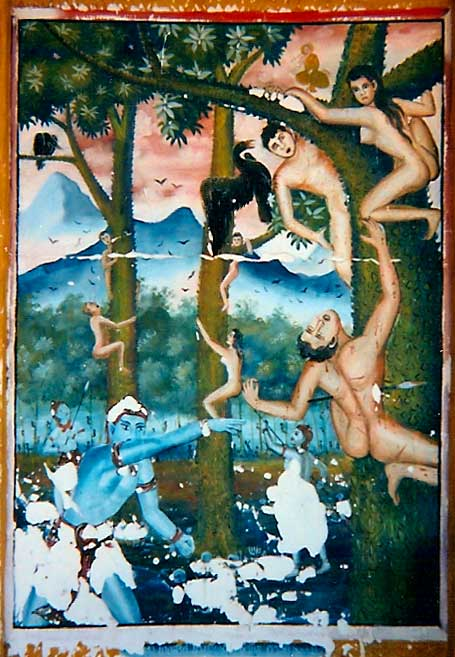
A mural from a temple in northern Thailand depicting naked beings climbing thorn-covered trees, pecked by birds from above, and attacked from below by hell guards armed with spears. There are icy mountains in the background, and Phra Malaya watches from above.

A mural from a temple in northern Thailand. Human-animal figures are dismembered and disemboweled by hell guards and birds, while Phra Malaya watches from above.

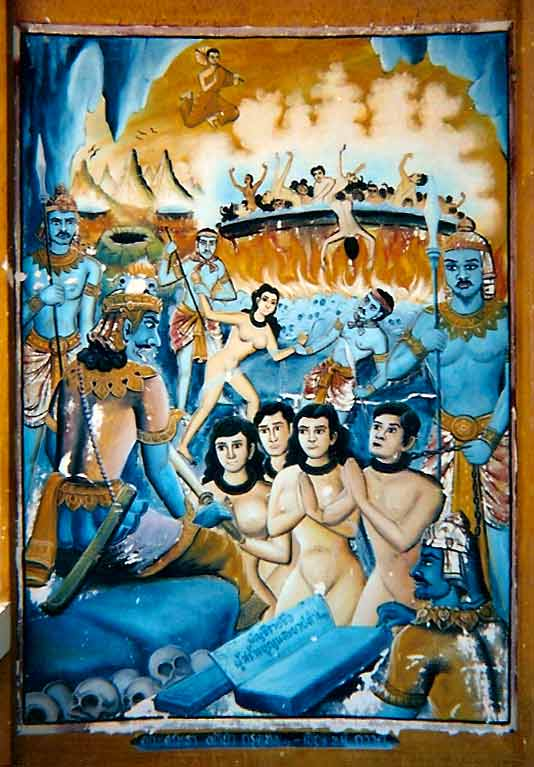
A mural from a temple in northern Thailand. The unclothed spirits of the dead are brought before Yama for judgement. Phra Malaya watches from above as beings are fried in a large oil cauldron.

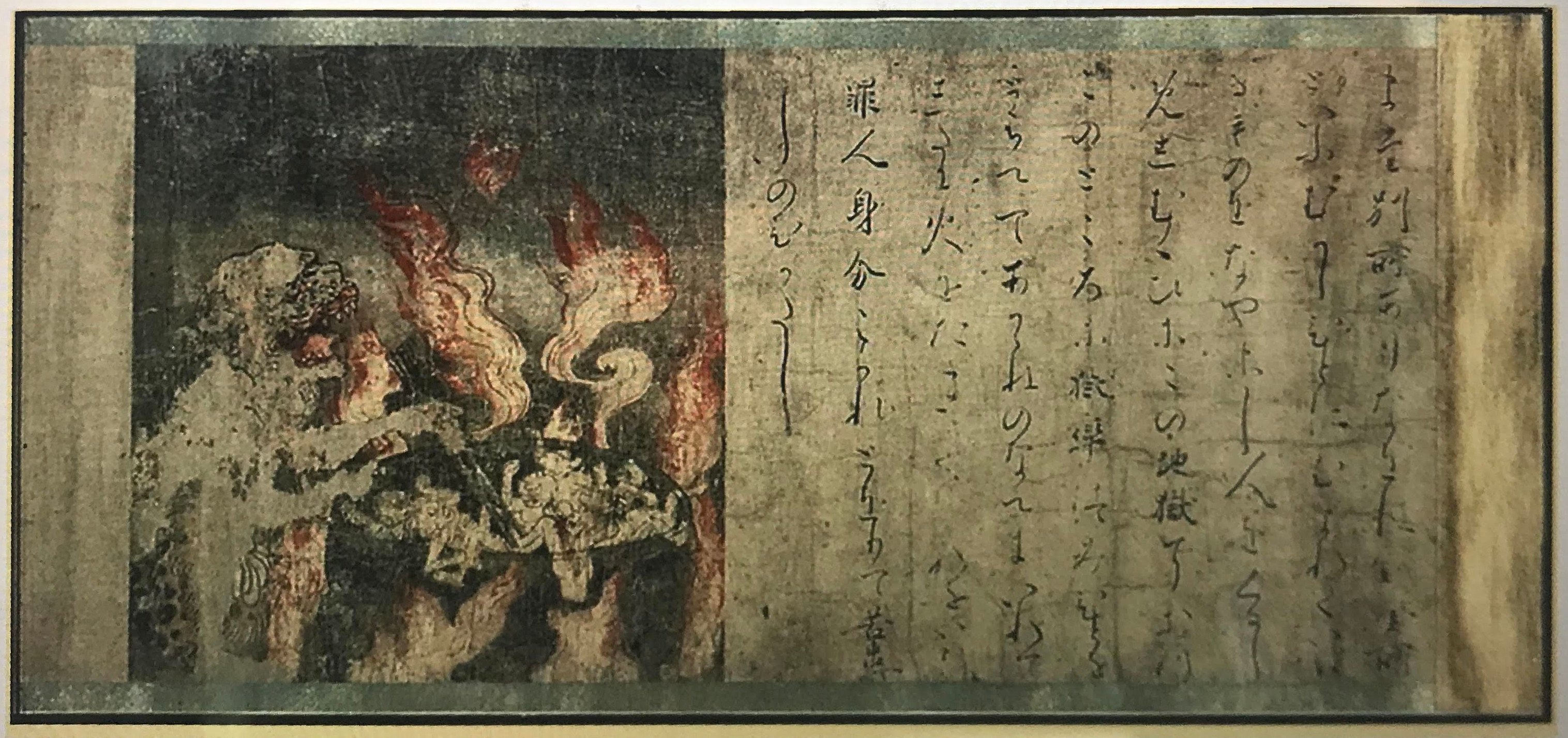
Currently held in the Museum of Fine Arts in Boston, this Japanese scroll is illustrated in the style of Jigoku Zoshi. Originally drawn during the Heian period in the 12th century depicting the 8 great hells and the 16 lesser hells in both text and painting. The specific fragment of the scroll being shown shows a demon stirring a heated cauldron full of people in the Hell of the Single Copper Cauldron.

== See also ==
- Bon Festival
- Diyu
- Ghost Festival
- Hell money
- Kṣitigarbha
- Maudgalyayana
- Naraka
  - Naraka (Hinduism)
  - Naraka (Jainism)
- Ox-Head and Horse-Face
- Ullambana Sutra
- Yama (Buddhism)
