= Lion Hunt of Ashurbanipal =

Assyrian palace relief

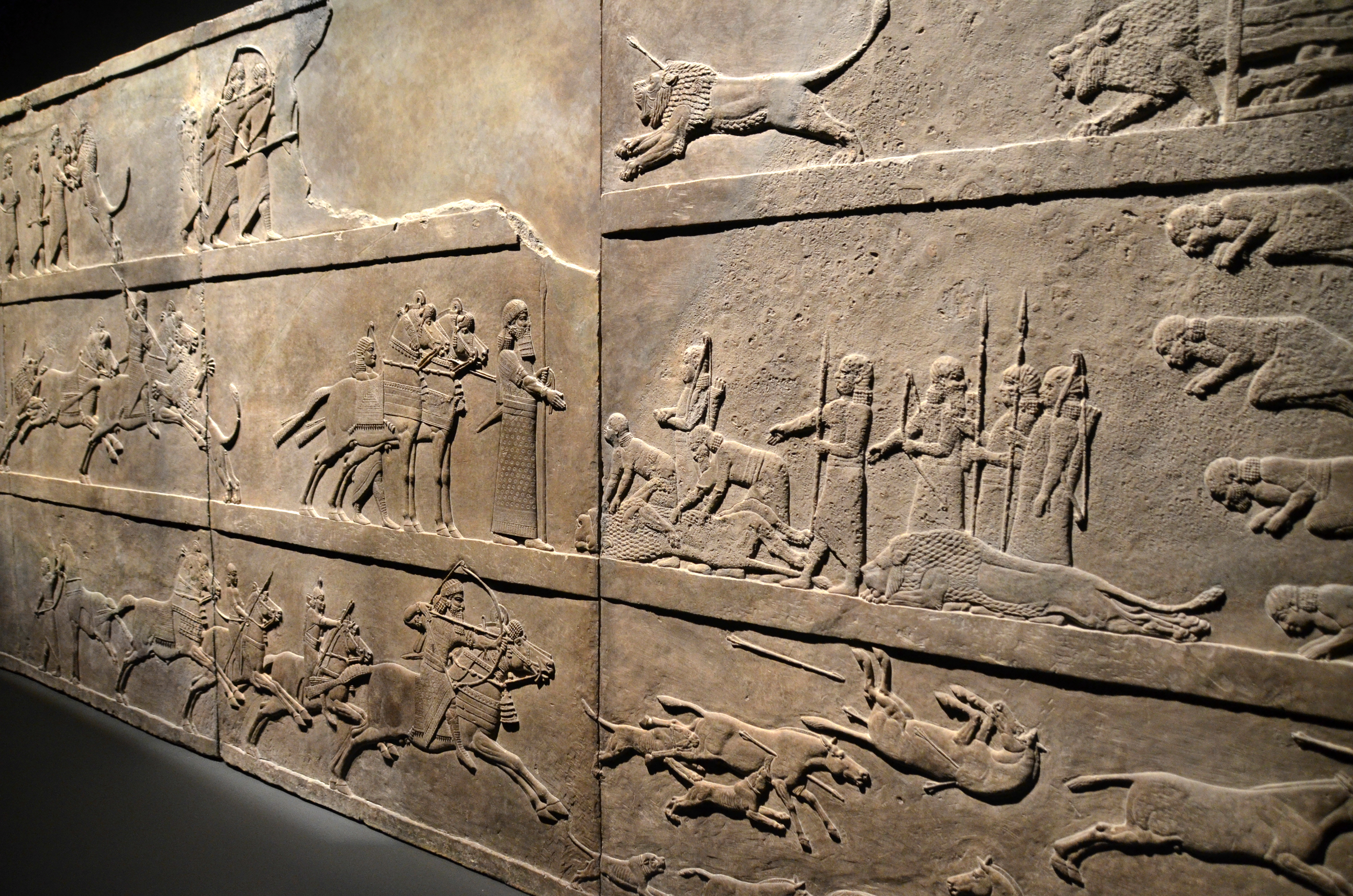
Relief of the Lion hunt of Ashurbanipal, British Museum

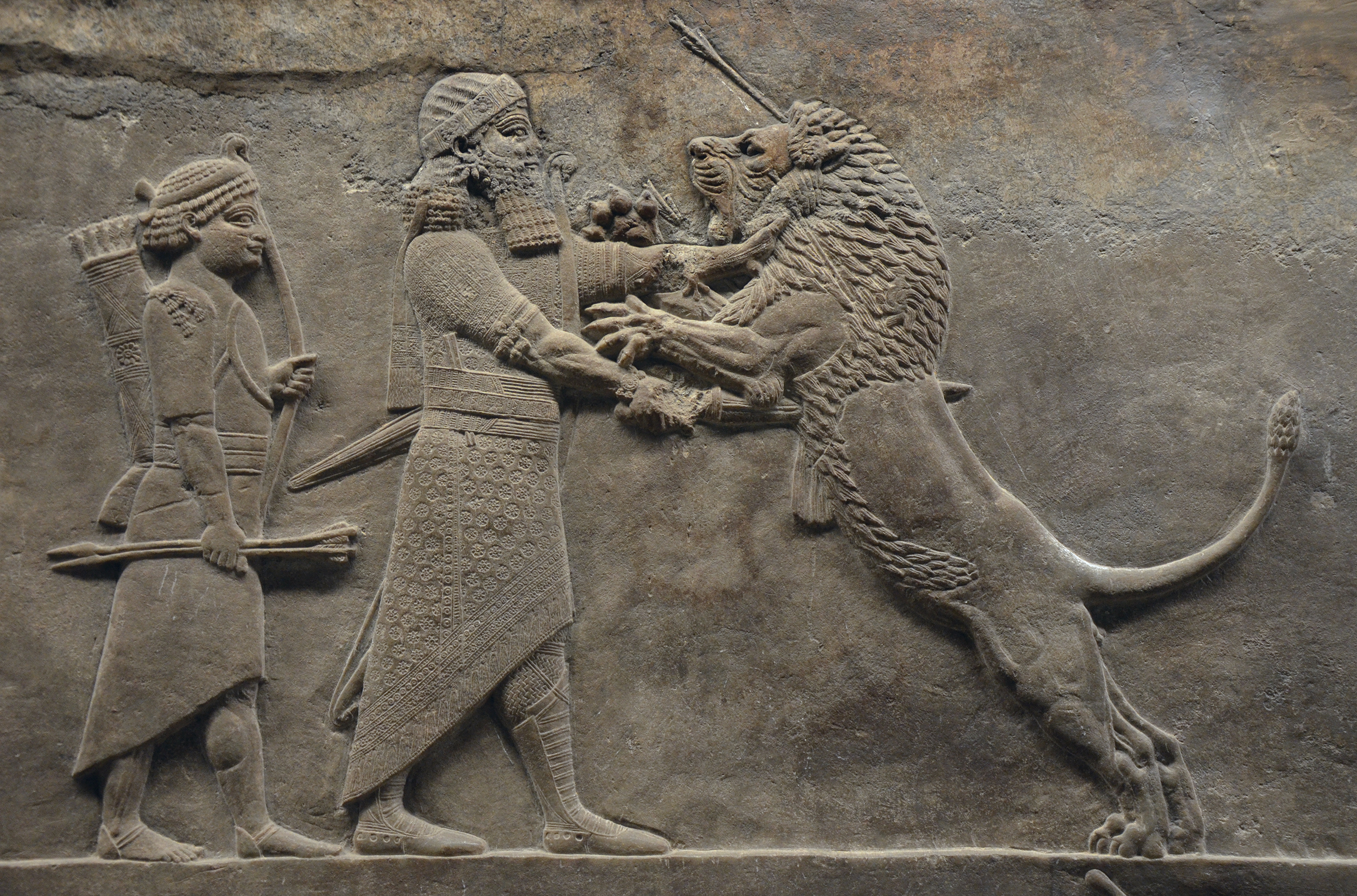
Relief with Ashurbanipal killing a lion, c. 645–635 BC

The royal Lion Hunt of Ashurbanipal is shown on a famous group of Assyrian palace reliefs from the North Palace of Nineveh that are now displayed in room 10a of the British Museum. They are widely regarded as "the supreme masterpieces of Assyrian art".

They show a formalized ritual "hunt" by King Ashurbanipal (reigned 669–631 BC) in an arena, where captured Asian lions were released from cages for the king to slaughter with arrows, spears, or his sword. They were made about 645–635 BC, and originally formed different sequences placed around the palace. They would probably originally have been painted, and formed part of a brightly coloured overall decor.

The slabs or orthostats from the North Palace were excavated by Hormuzd Rassam in 1852–1854, and William Loftus in 1854–1855 and most were sent to the British Museum, where they have been favourites with the general public and art historians alike ever since. The realism of the lions has always been praised, although the pathos modern viewers tend to feel was perhaps not part of the Assyrian response. The human figures are mostly seen in formal poses in profile, especially the king in his several appearances, but the lions are in a great variety of poses, alive, dying, and dead.

The carvings come from late in the period of some 250 years over which Assyrian palace reliefs were made, and show the style at its most developed and finest, before decline set in. Ashurbanipal was the last great Assyrian king, and after his reign ended the Neo-Assyrian Empire descended into a period of poorly-recorded civil war between his descendants, generals and rebelling parts of the empire. By 612, perhaps as little as 25 years after these were made, the empire had fallen apart and Nineveh been sacked and burnt.

== Assyrian lion hunts ==
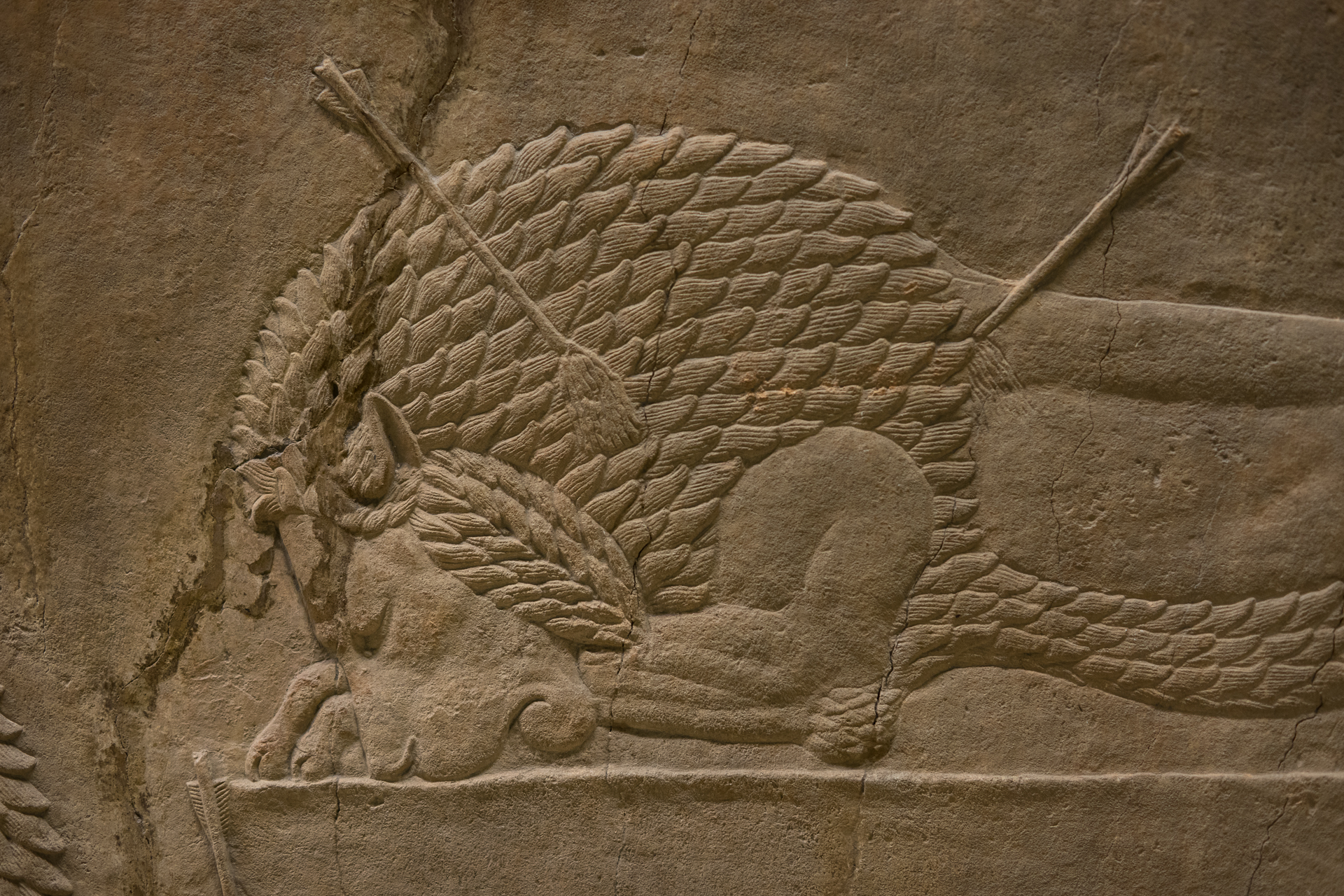
Detail of dead lion

For over a millennium before these reliefs, it seems that the killing of lions was reserved in Mesopotamia for royalty, and kings were often shown in art doing so. There may have been a religious dimension to the activity. A surviving letter on a clay tablet records that when a lion entered a house in the provinces, it had to be trapped and taken by boat to the king. The Asiatic lion, today only surviving in a small population in India, is generally smaller than the African variety, and much later records show that their killing at close quarters, as depicted in the reliefs, was not an impossible feat. When the sword is used, it seems likely that, as in relatively recent times, the actual technique was that "the lion-killer wrapped his left arm in a huge quantity of goats'-hair yarn or tent-cloth" and tempted the lion to attack this, while the sword in the right hand despatched him. This padded defence is never depicted. More often, the king shot arrows at the lion; if these failed to stop him and he leapt, the huntsmen close beside the king used their spears.

An earlier king, Ashurnasirpal II (r. 883–859), who had erected other lion hunt reliefs in his palace at Nimrud some 200 years before, boasted in inscriptions of about 865 BC that "the gods Ninurta and Nergal, who love my priesthood, gave me the wild animals of the plains, commanding me to hunt. 30 elephants I trapped and killed; 257 great wild oxen I brought down with my weapons, attacking from my chariot; 370 great lions I killed with hunting spears". Ashurnasirpal is shown shooting arrows at lions from his chariot, so perhaps this was a more conventional hunt in open country, or is also in an arena.

In the later reliefs captured lions are released into an enclosed space, formed by soldiers making a shield-wall. Some are shown being released from wooden crates by an attendant in a smaller crate sitting on top, who lifts up a gate. Despite the hunting, lions survived in Iraq until 1918.

The lions may sometimes have been raised in captivity. Ashurnasirpal II, in an inscription boasting of his zoo, stated: "With my fierce heart I captured 15 lions from the Zagros Mountains and forests. I took away 50 lion cubs. I herded them into Kalhu (Nimrud) and the palaces of my land into cages. I bred their cubs in great numbers."

== Palace reliefs ==
External videos
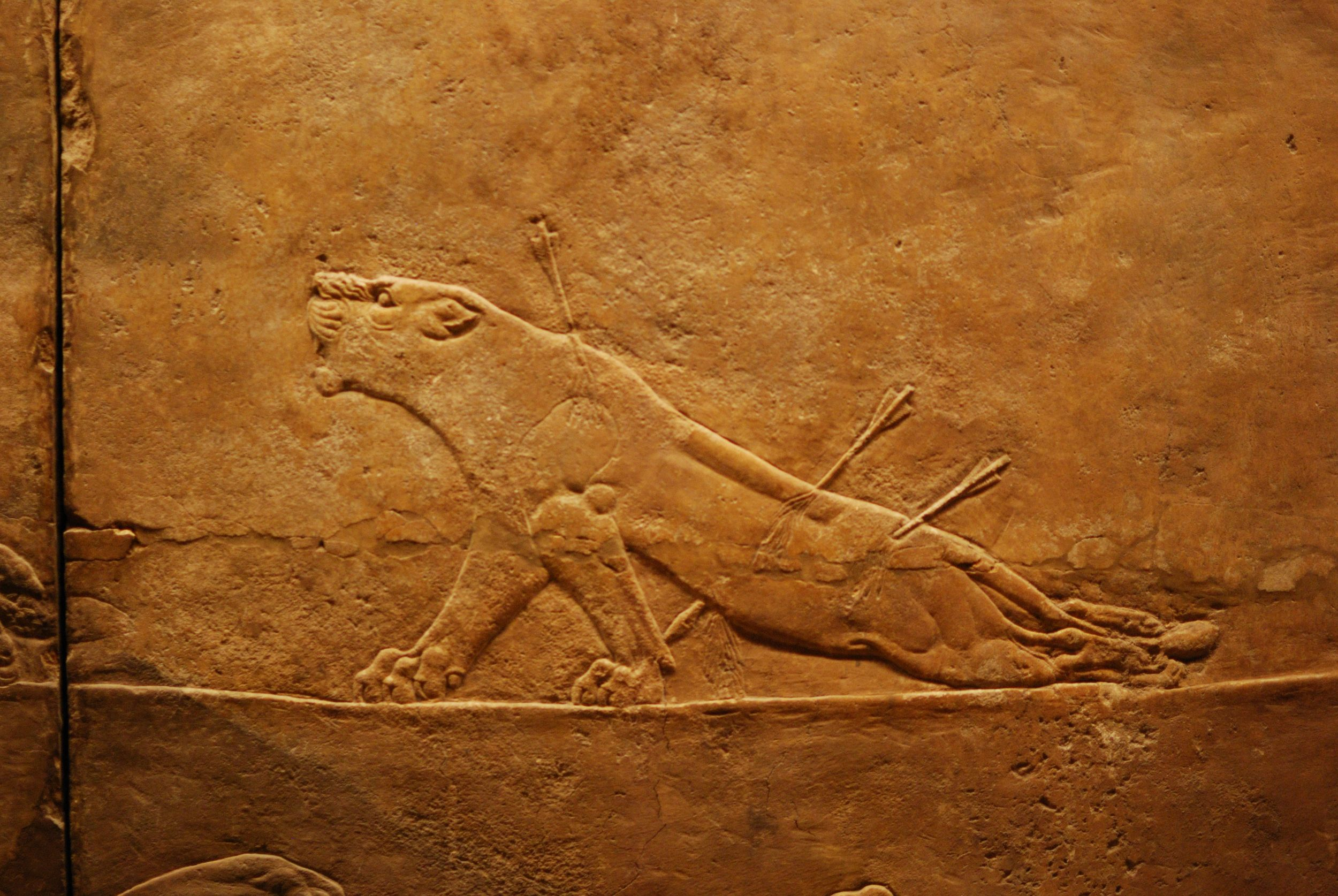
- Assyrian Art: Ashurbanipal Hunting Lions, Smarthistory

There are some two dozen sets of scenes of lion hunting in recorded Assyrian palace reliefs, most giving the subject a much more brief treatment than here. Neo-Assyrian palaces were very extensively decorated with such reliefs, carved in a very low relief on slabs that are mostly of gypsum alabaster, which was plentiful in northern Iraq. Other animals were also shown being hunted, and the main subject for narrative reliefs was the war campaigns of the king who built the palace. Other reliefs showed the king, his court, and "winged genie" and lamassu protective minor deities.

Most palace reliefs occupied the walls of large halls, with several rooms in sequence. But the lion hunt scenes in the North Palace come from more than one space; mostly from relatively narrow passageways, leading off the larger rooms. They are not complete. Some also were originally on the upper floor, though they had fallen down to below ground level by the time they were excavated. Their original setting was, in terms of dimensions, not that different from the way they are displayed today, though the ceiling would have been higher. The same palace has a much less usual relief with a male and female lion relaxing in a lush palace garden, the lioness snoozing, a "shady idyll" that perhaps represents palace pets, which we know lions sometimes were.

== Scenes ==
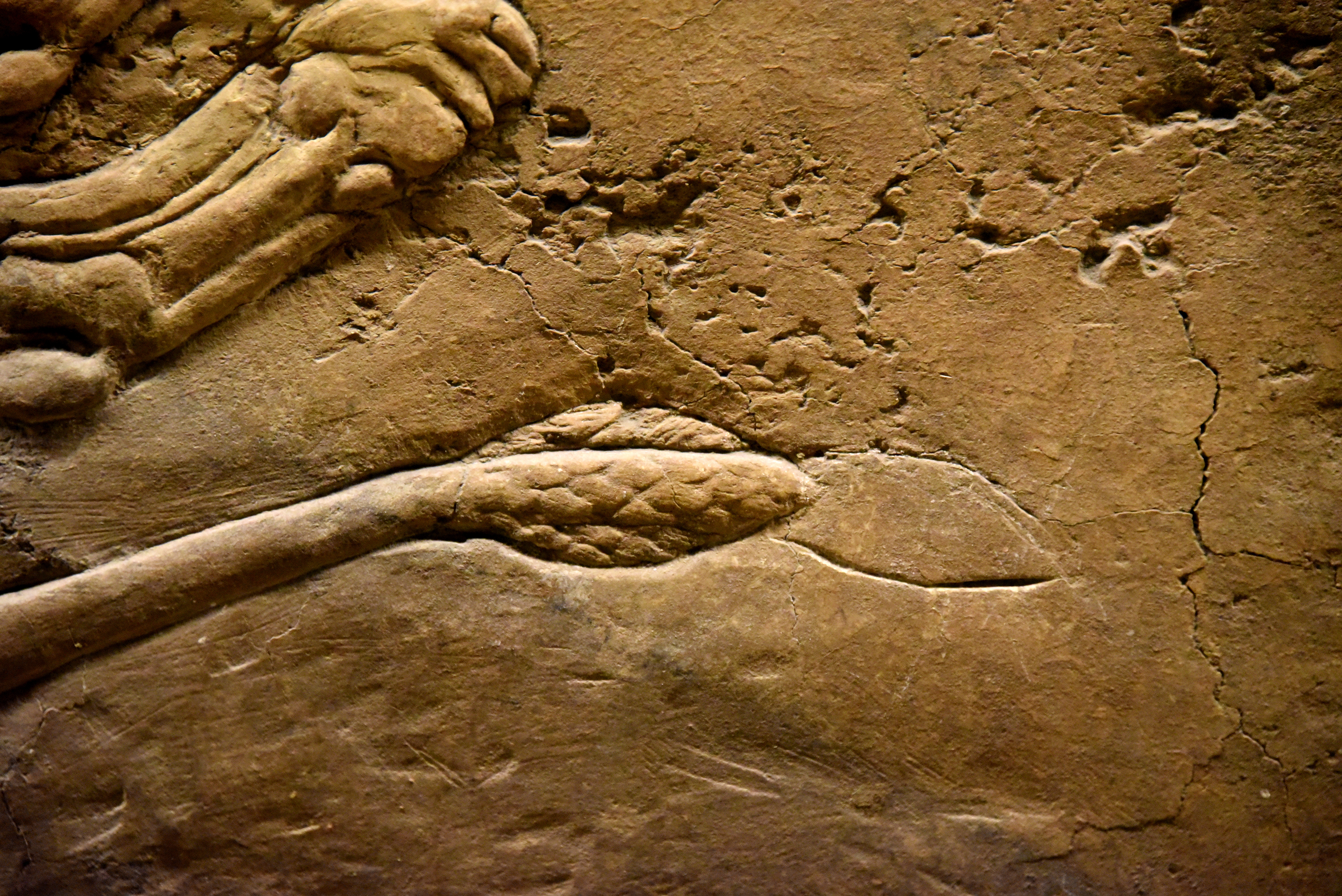
The tuft at the end of one of the dead lions' tail was misplaced initially by the sculptor. Its outline can be seen clearly.

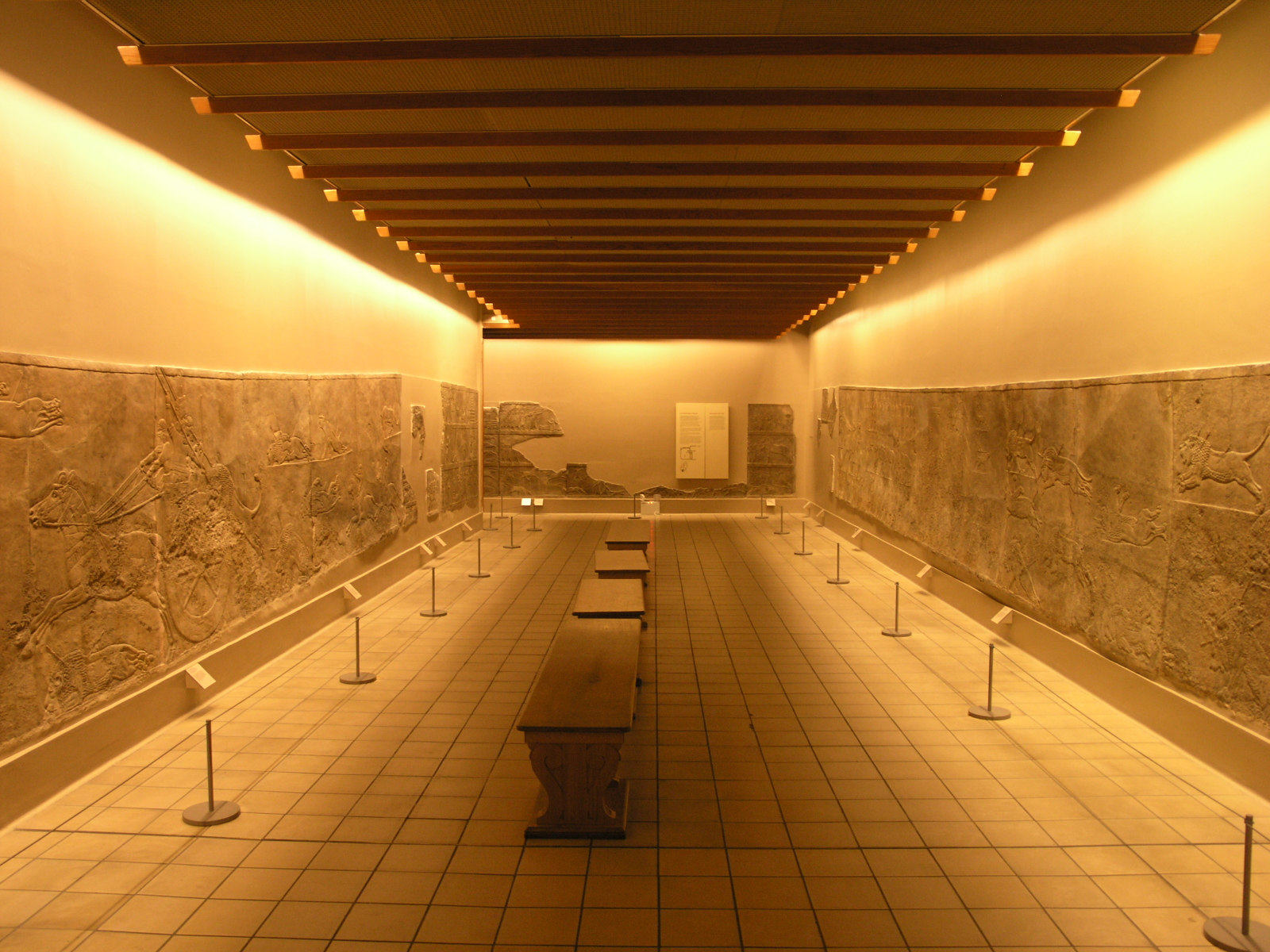
Room 10a, British Museum. On the left, the better-preserved single register scenes, with the smaller triple register ones beyond.

Some of the lion hunt reliefs occupy the whole height of the slab; like most narrative Assyrian reliefs the scenes of military campaigns from the same palace are mostly divided into two horizontal registers. The reliefs which came from the upper floor have scenes on three registers. Ground-lines are clearly indicated, which is not always the case, and indeed some lions are given individual ground lines when forming part of a larger scene. As well as the animals, depicted with "extraordinary subtlety of observation", the carving of the details of the king's costume are especially fine. At a late stage in their execution, the tails of nearly all the lions in the single register reliefs were shortened.

The single register scenes show three large scenes from one side of a corridor. The arena of shields is shown, with a crowd of people either climbing a wooded hill for a good view, or getting away from this dangerous activity. At the top of the hill is a small building carrying a scene showing the king lion-hunting. The king makes ready in his chariot, the horses held by grooms. Huntsmen with large mastiff dogs and spears wait within the arena for any lion that comes too close to the shield-wall. In the large scene with the king hunting in his chariot, a total of 18 lions is shown, mostly dead or wounded. The other side of the corridor had similar scenes with the royal chariot in action shown twice.

Another group of reliefs, some originally located on the upper floor and some in a small "private gate-chamber", are set out in three registers with a plain strip between them, with the figures much smaller. Some scenes are repeated, but not exactly, between the two groups. The lions released from cages charging at the king on foot are from here, and also the king pouring a libation onto the collected bodies of the dead lions. Some of this group are in Paris, and others were recorded in drawings but lost. These include scenes showing the king hunting lions and other animals in the wild; gazelles are beaten towards the king, hiding in a pit with bow and arrow. In one scene, the same lion is shown three times close together: exiting his cage, charging towards the king, and leaping up at him, somewhat in the manner of a modern strip cartoon.

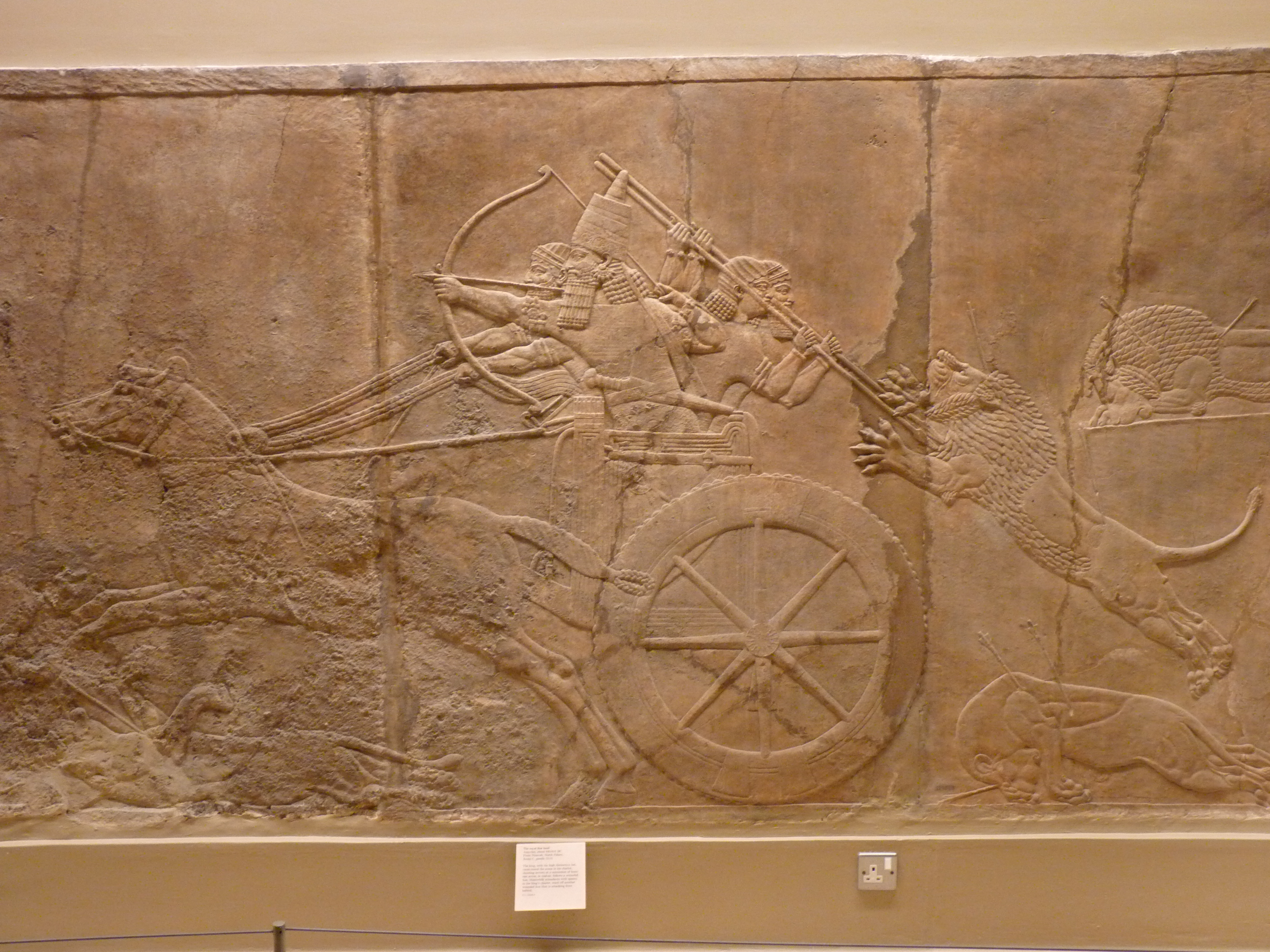
Relief of Ashurbanipal hunting a Mesopotamian lion, from the Northern Palace in Nineveh, as seen at the British Museum

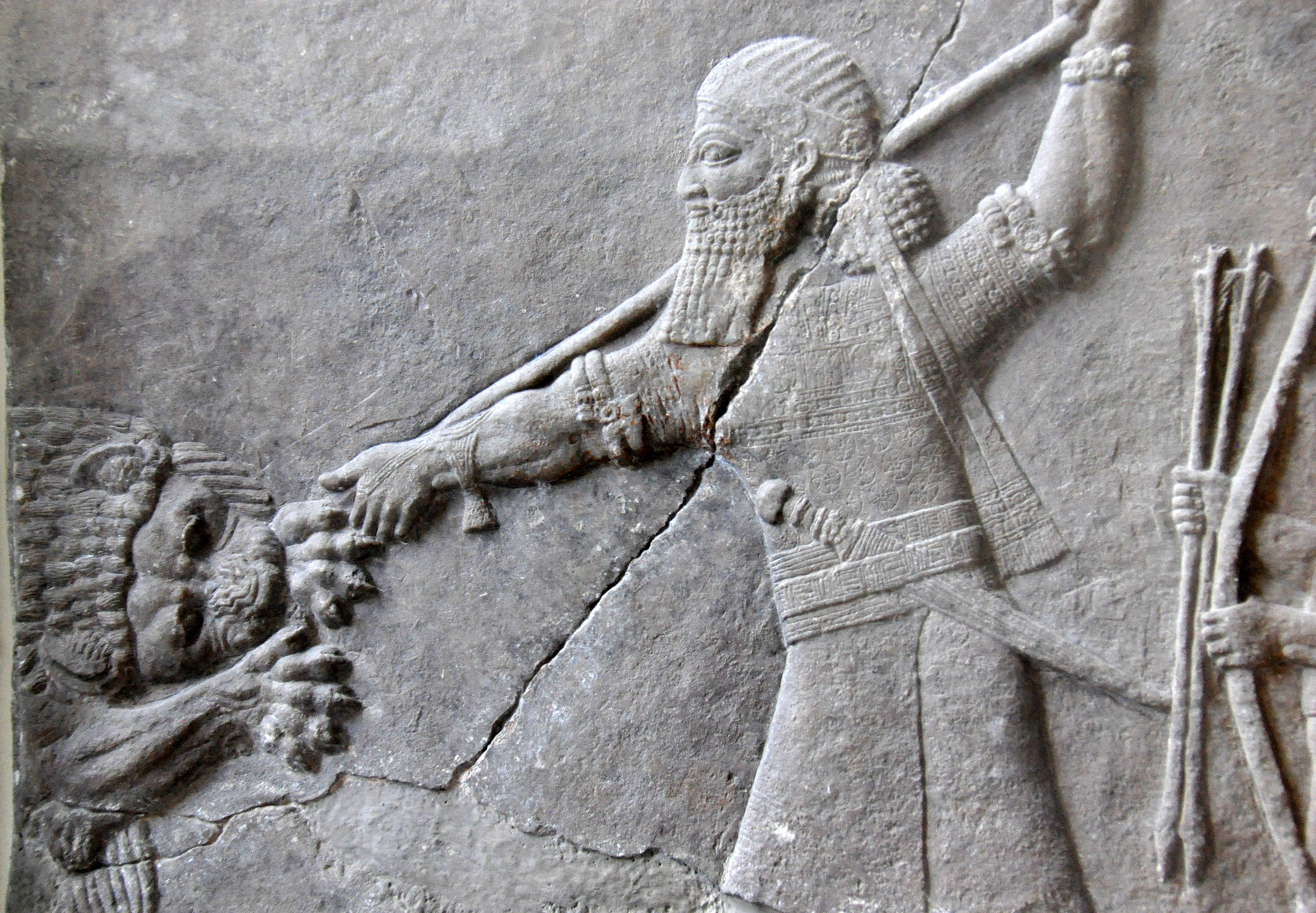
Lion-hunting scene of Ashurbanipal. Alabaster bas-relief from the North Palace at Nineveh, Neo-Assyrian, reign of Ashurbanipal, 668–627 BC. Pergamon Museum.

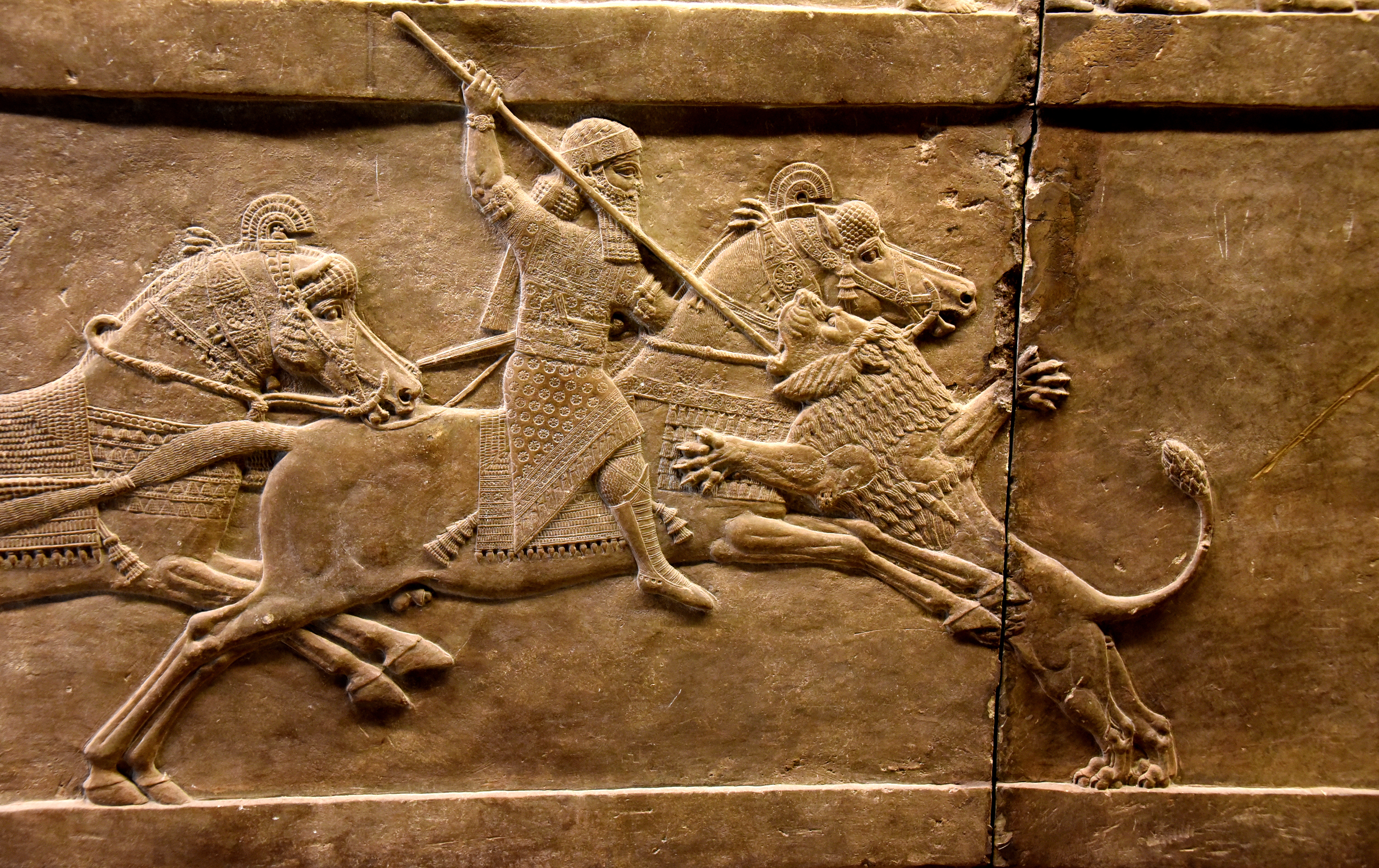
Ashurbanipal on horseback spearing a lion. Alabaster bas-relief from Nineveh, 645–635 BCE.

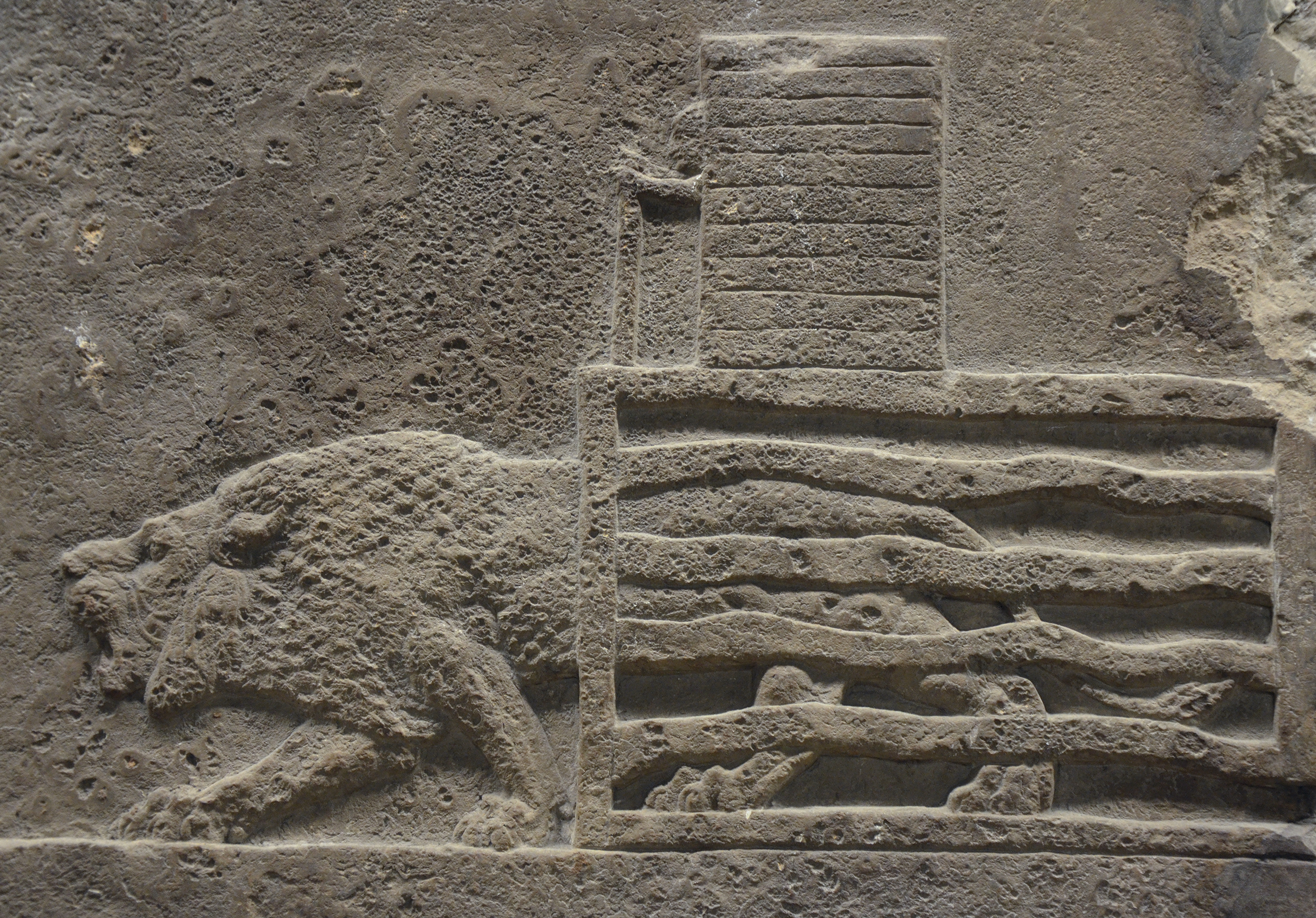
An attendant releases a lion from its cage.

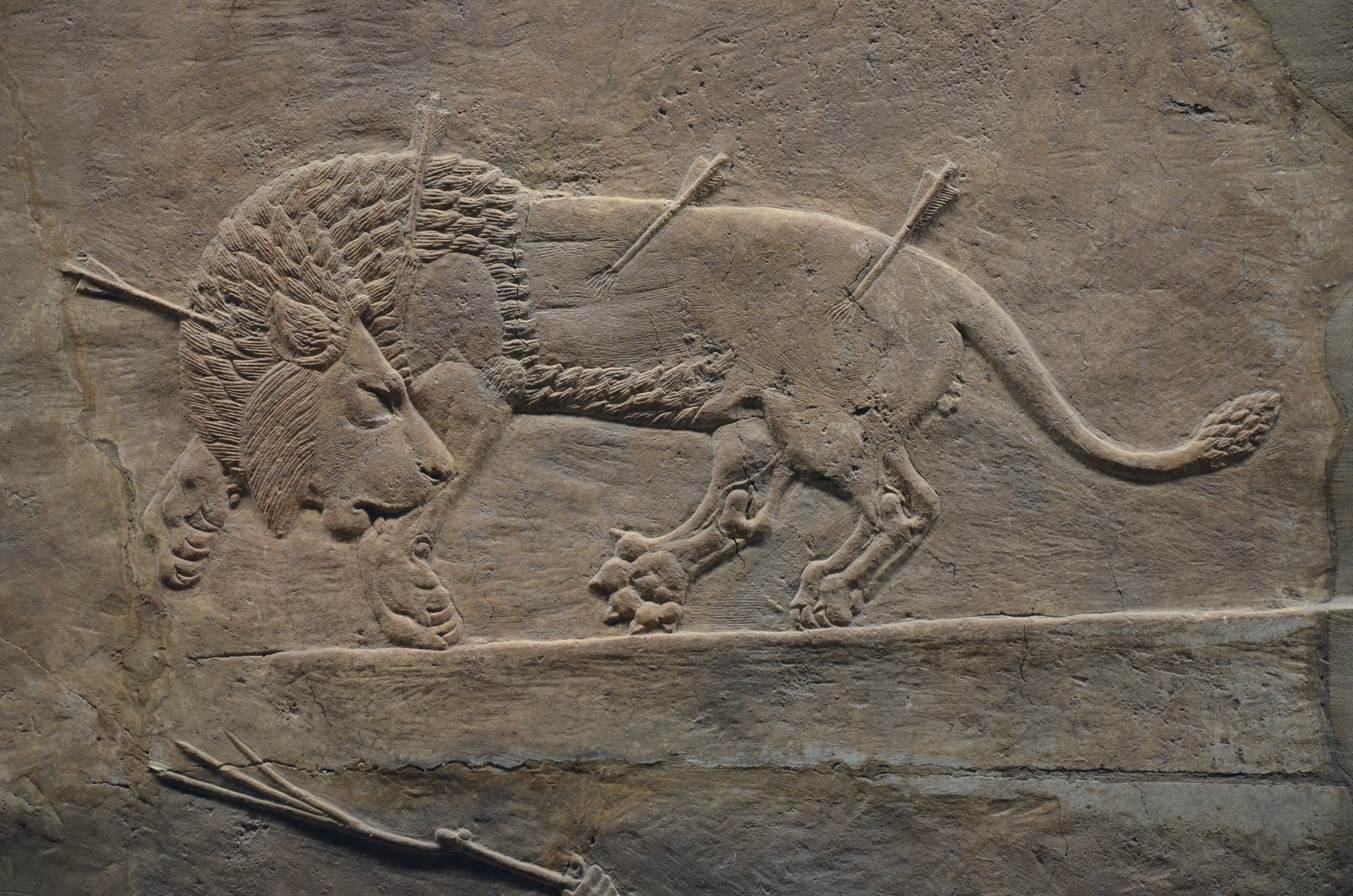
Wounded lion

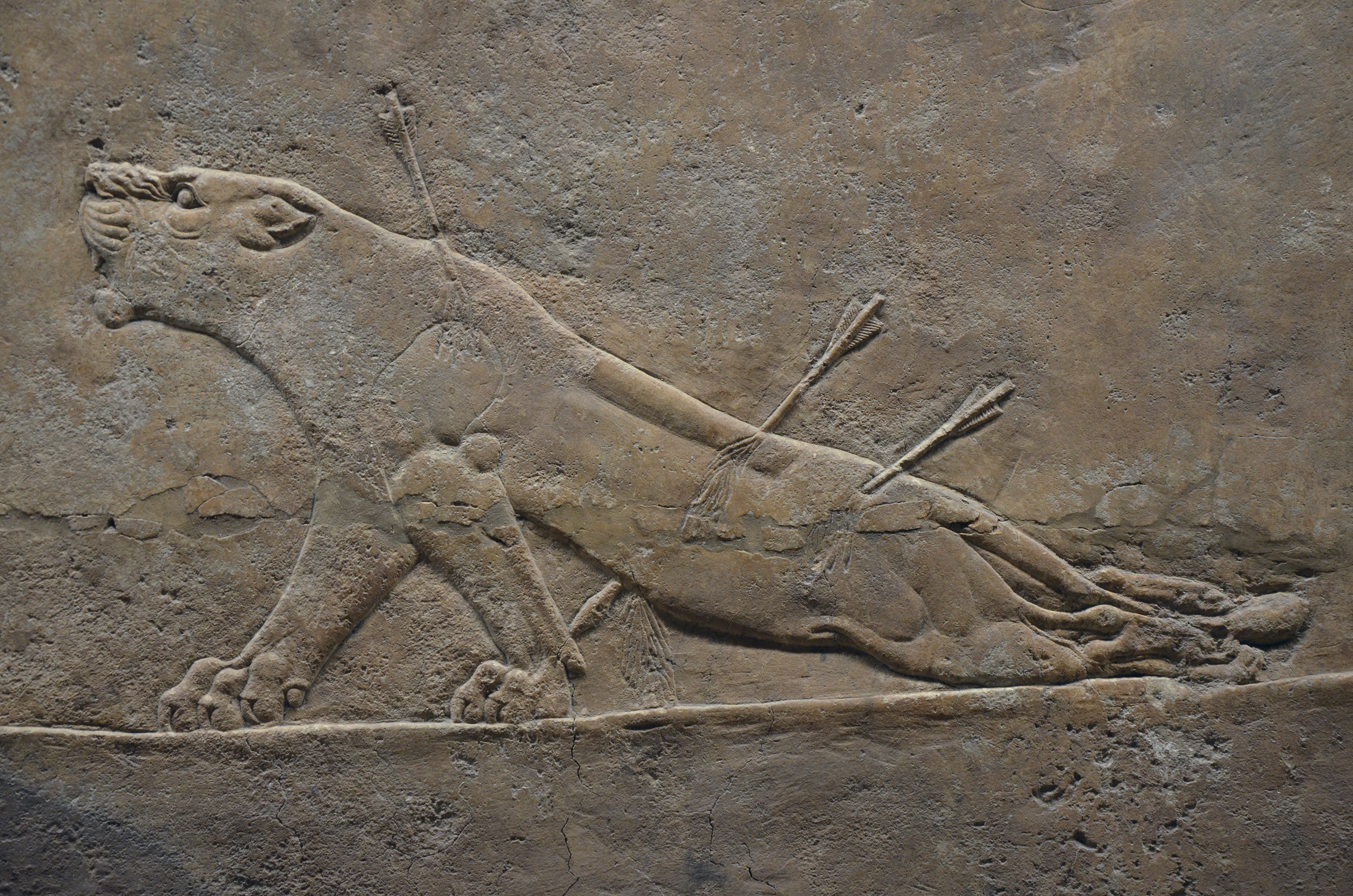
Wounded lioness

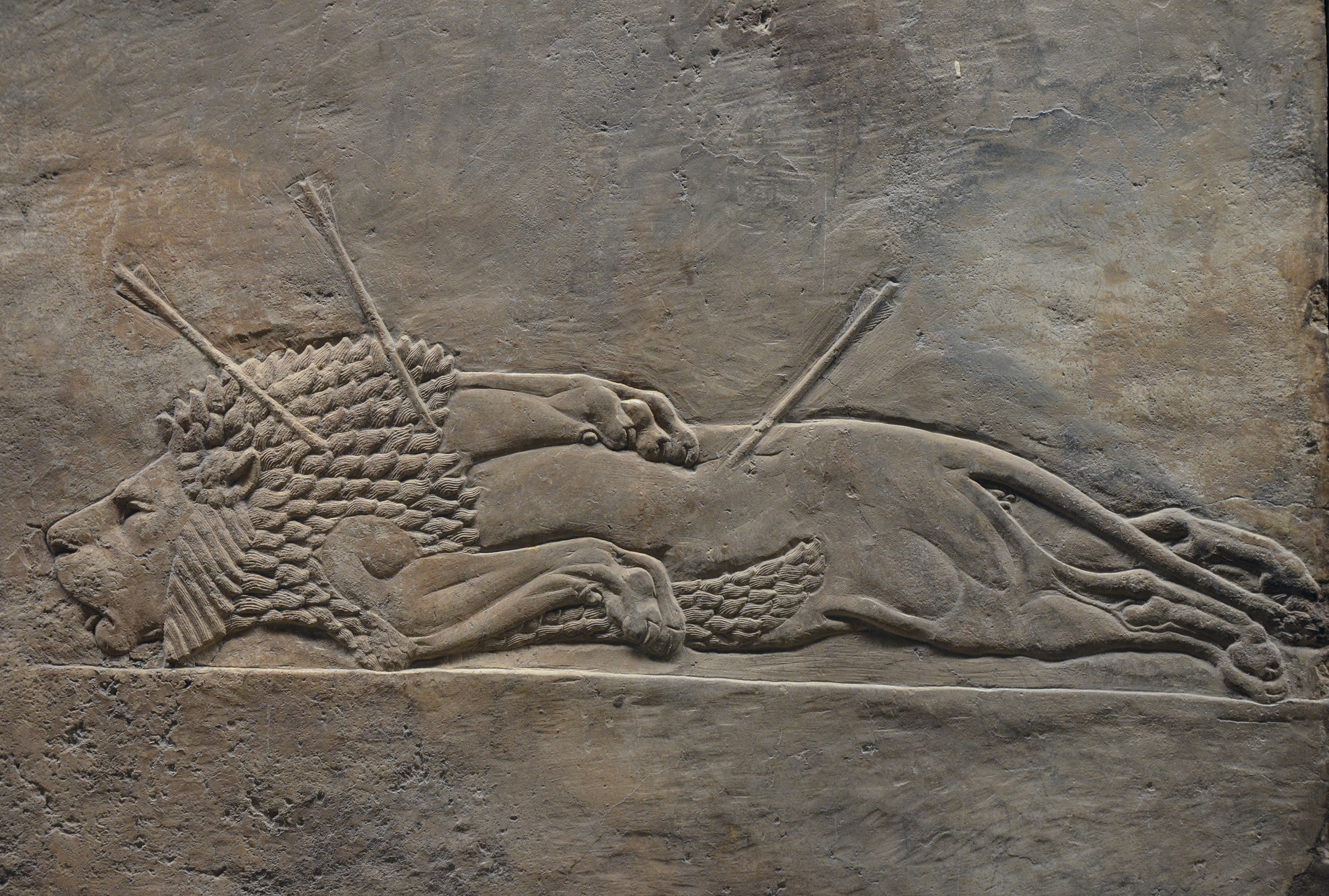
Dead lion

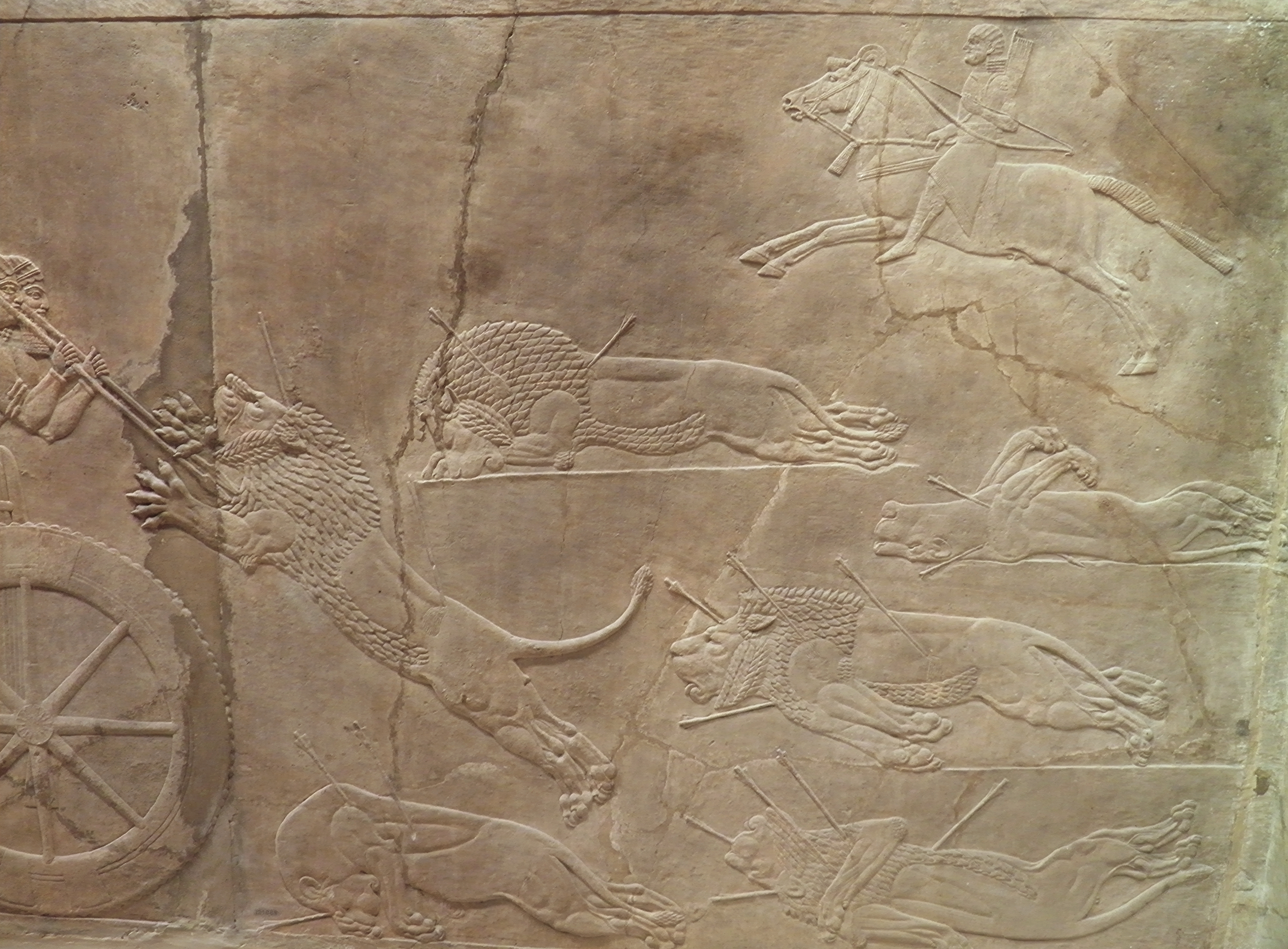
Lions behind the king's chariot

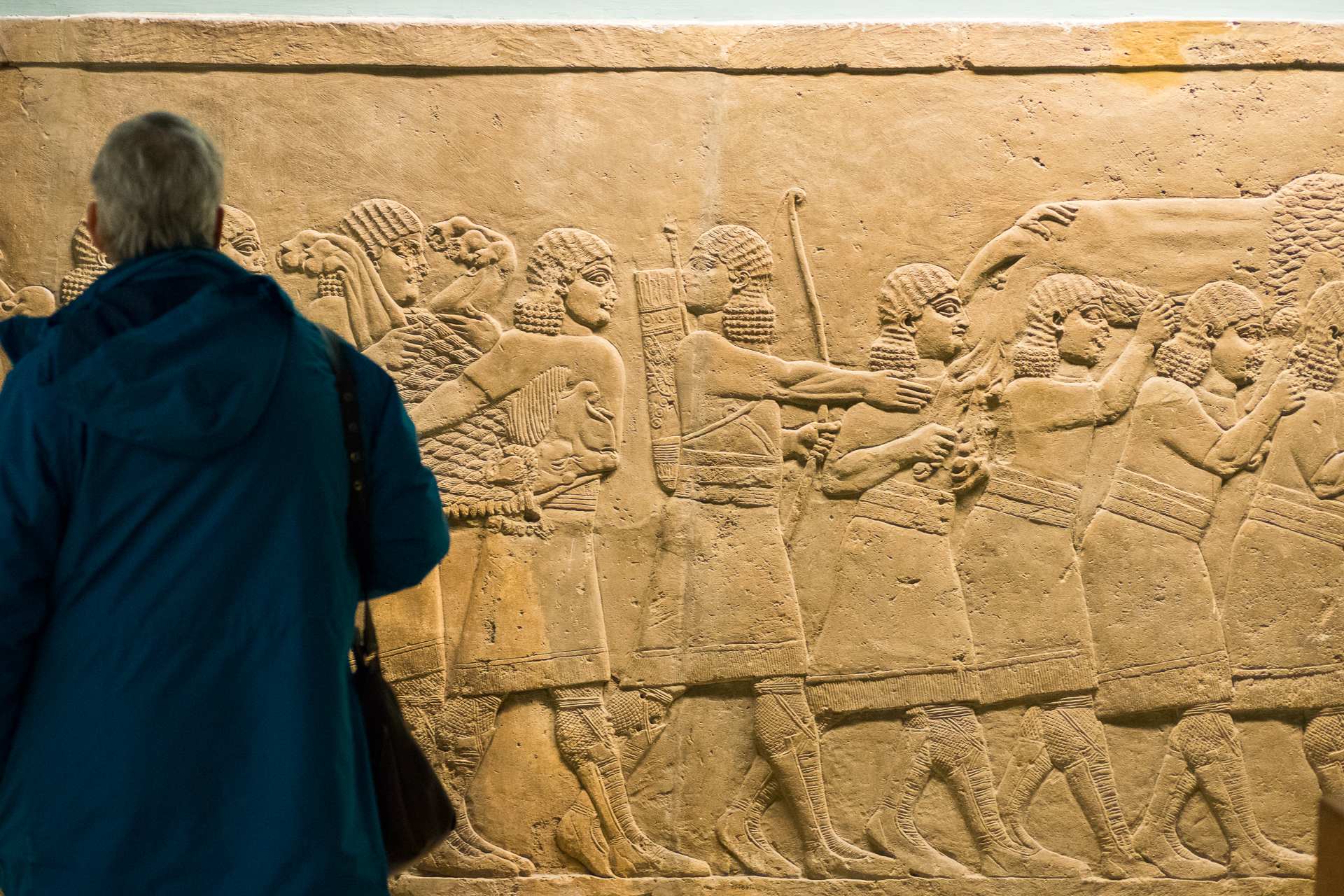
Huntsmen carrying dead lions away

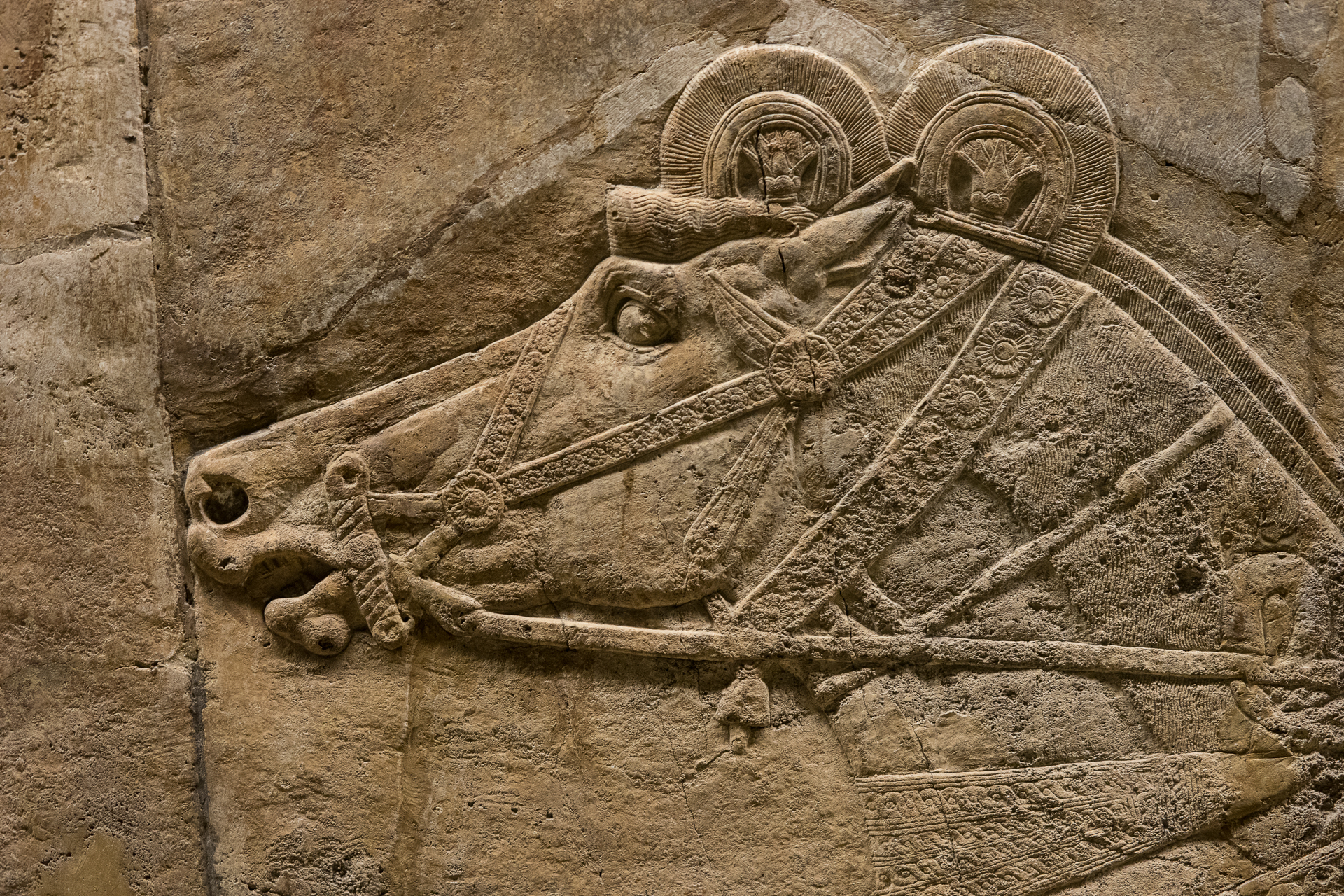
Chariot horses

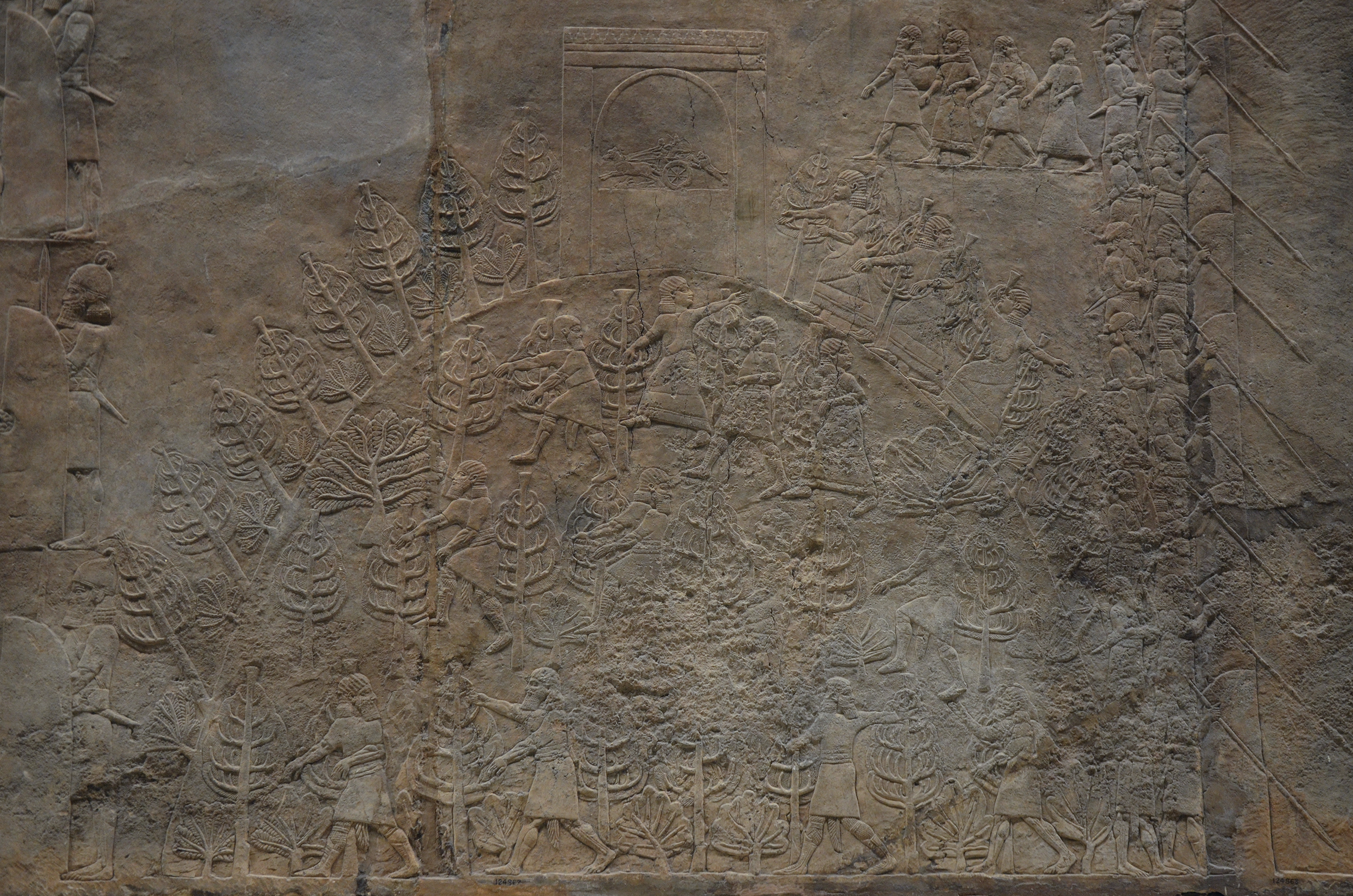
The wooded hill, with the shield-wall at right

== See also ==
- Ishtar Gate
- Lion of Babylon (statue)
