= Assyrian Mastiff =

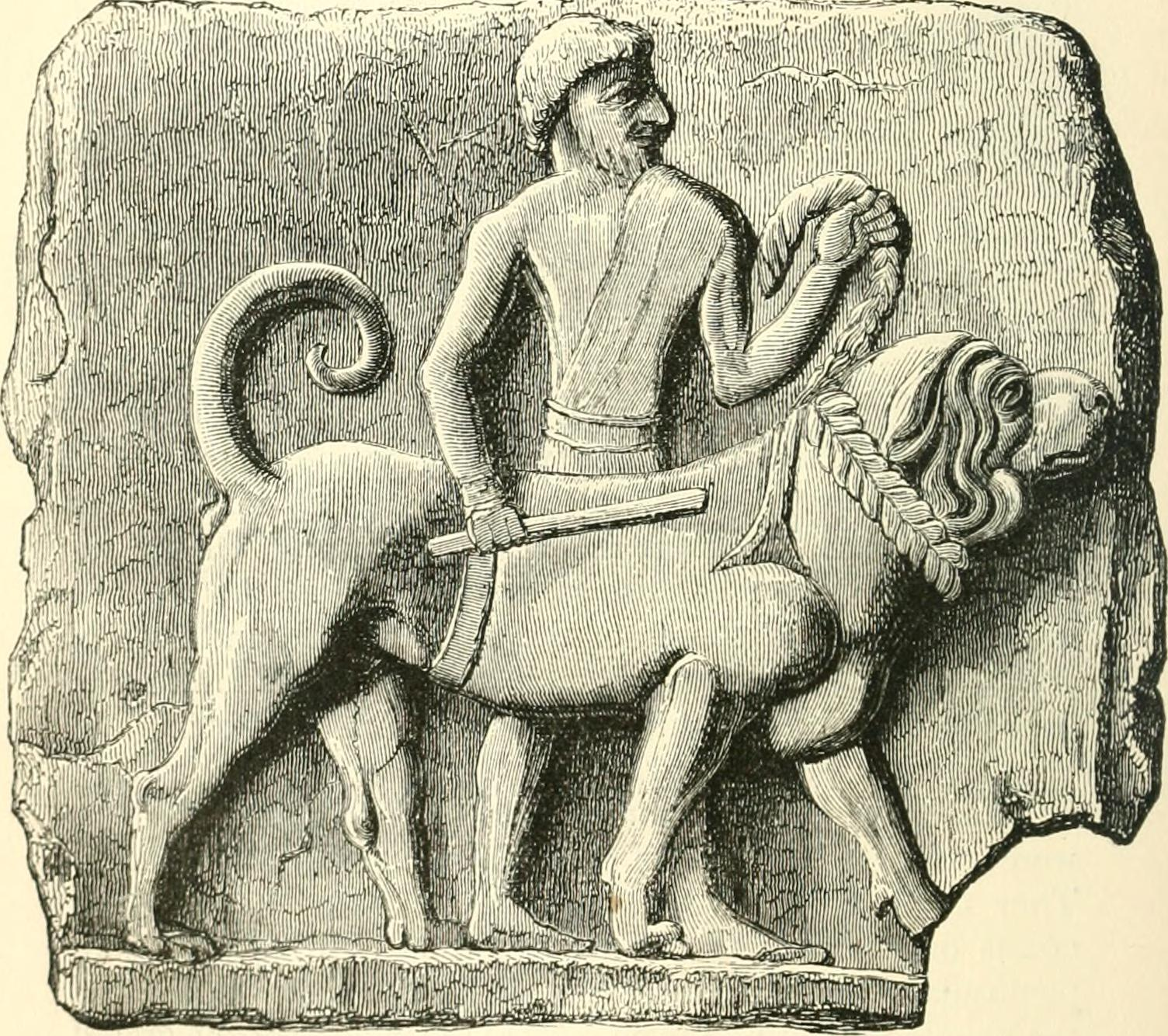
- A drawing of a terracotta tablet found in Babylon
- Origin: Assyria
- Breed status: Extinct

The Assyrian Mastiff, was a landrace of dog found in Assyria. This dog was often used as a livestock guardian against predators, as well as for lion and wild horse-hunting. The modern Assyrian Shepherd (in more recent years also known as the Kurdish Mastiff) is likely to be a descendant of the Assyrian mastiff.

The name is most likely derived from the images of this type of dog that appear in Assyrian, Babylonian and other Mesopotamian reliefs dating from the 10th to 6th century BCE Neo-Assyrian Empire.

== History ==
It is assumed the Assyrian mastiff had their ancestors in the region between India and Persia where they were domesticated and used as hunting dogs. Several mastiff type figures of the Assyrian era around 2000 BC were discovered with carved-in names such as "Consume his life", "Don't stop to think, bite", and "Catcher of the hostile one". More Assyrian relics depicting dogs can be found from between 1000 and 650 BC.

== Description ==
In 1886, M.B. Wynn described the ancient Assyrian's clay tablet's depictions of the Assyrian Mastiff:

It is also worthy of remark that the Assyrians were always careful to define long hair when it existed, but in this specimen the stern appears free from any roughness, although so minute are the details that the very fraying at the end of the rope is depicted, the loose skin hangs down the face in enormous wrinkles or folds, and the lips were extremely pendulous evidently, although the mouth is marked by a slit or line in the usual conventional form of Assyrian sculpture. The ears are of medium size, chest very deep, and limbs massive, the head short and of great volumn, and muzzle short and truncated. There is a great similarity between this dog and some of our noted English specimens.

== See also ==
- Assyria
- List of dog breeds
- Mesopotamia
