= Baseri (disambiguation) =

The Basseri, Baseri or Basiri (Persian: باصری) is an ethnic group in Iran, it also may refer to:

- Baseri Aqajan, Eqlid County, Iran
- Baseri Hadi, Eqlid County, Iran
- Baseri, Marvdasht County, Iran
- Gol Makan-e Baseri, Marvdasht County, Iran
- Hosseinabad-e Baseri, Marvdasht County, Iran
- Sakhteman-e Baseri, Marvdasht County, Iran
- Izadkhast-e Baseri, Shiraz County, Iran
- Baseri, a village in Nepal
- Baseri, a village in Guinea
- Baseri tehsil, a tehsil in Rajasthan, India
- Baseri Basnal, a village in Uttarakhand, India
- Baseri, an assembly constituency in Rajasthan, India
- Mohammad Baseri (1972–2026), Iranian intelligence officer

== See also ==
- Baserri
- Bassari people
- Bassari Country, Senegal
