= Kharestan =

Kharestan (Persian: خارستان) may refer to:

- Kharestan, Fars
- Kharestan, Gilan
- Kharestan, Kohgiluyeh and Boyer-Ahmad
- Kharestan-e Bala, Sistan and Baluchestan Province
- Kharestan-e Pain, Sistan and Baluchestan Province
- Kharestan, South Khorasan
- Kharestan-e Olya (disambiguation)
- Kharestan-e Sofla (disambiguation)
