= Sedeh (disambiguation) =

Sedeh is a city in Fars Province, Iran.

Sedeh (Persian: سده) may also refer to:

- Arianshahr, formerly Sedeh, a city in South Khorasan Province, Iran
- Khomeyni Shahr, formerly Sedeh, a city in Isfahan Province, Iran
- Sedeh Lenjan, also Sedeh, a city in Isfahan Province, Iran
- Sedeh, Darab, a village in Fars Province, Iran
- Sedeh, Fasa, a village in Fars Province, Iran
- Sedeh, Khonj, a village in Fars Province, Iran
- Sedeh, Gilan, a village in Rasht County, Gilan Province, Iran
- Sedeh, Razavi Khorasan, a village in Khvaf County, Razavi Khorasan Province, Iran
- Sedeh District (Fars Province), an administrative subdivision of Iran
- Sedeh District (Qaen County), an administrative subdivision of Iran
- Sedeh Rural District (Fars Province), an administrative subdivision of Iran
- Sedeh Rural District (Markazi Province), an administrative subdivision of Iran
- Sedeh Rural District (Qaen County), an administrative subdivision of Iran
