= Azadegan, Iran =

Azadegan (Persian: ازادگان) may refer to:

- Azadegan League
- Azadegan, Chaharmahal and Bakhtiari
- Azadegan, Fars
- Azadegan, West Azerbaijan
- Azadegan 1, Kerman Province
- Azadegan Rural District (Kerman Province)
- Azadegan Rural District (Mazandaran Province)
- Azadegan Oil Field
- Rustai-ye Azadegan, Kerman Province
- Azadegan Industrial Works Complex, Isfahan Province

== See also ==
- Azadegan (disambiguation)
- Dasht-e Azadegan (disambiguation)
