= Espas =

Espas may refer to the following places:

- Espas, Gers, France
- Aspas, Fars, Iran
  - Aspas Rural District
- Espas, Zanjan, Iran

== See also ==
- Aspas (disambiguation)
- Isbaz, Dänew, Turkmenistan, a village
- Ispas, Ukraine, a village
