= Mur Pahn =

Mur Pahn مورپهن
- Village
- Location within Iran
- Coordinates: 30°43′17″N 51°55′51″E
- Country: Iran
- Province: Fars
- County: Eqlid
- Bakhsh: Sedeh
- Rural District: Dezhkord

Population (2006)
  - Total: 266
- Time zone: UTC+3:30 (IRST)
  - Summer (DST): UTC+4:30 (IRDT)

Mur Pahn (Persian: مورپهن, also Romanized as Mūr Pahn) is a village in Dezhkord Rural District, Sedeh District, Eqlid County, Fars province, Iran. At the 2006 census, its population was 266, in 48 families.
