= Khar sun =

Khar sun may refer to:

- Khar sun Olya
- Khar sun Sofla
