= Jamal Beyg =

Jamal Beyg جمال بيگ
- Village
- Location within Iran
- Coordinates: 30°36′31″N 51°57′14″E
- Country: Iran
- Province: Fars
- County: Eqlid
- Bakhsh: Sedeh
- Rural District: Dezhkord

Population (2006)
  - Total: 305
- Time zone: UTC+3:30 (IRST)
  - Summer (DST): UTC+4:30 (IRDT)

Jamal Beyg (Persian: جمال بيگ, also Romanized as Jamāl Beyg) is a village in Dezhkord Rural District, Sedeh District, Eqlid County, Fars province, Iran. At the 2006 census, its population was 305, in 76 families.
