= Mahjan =

Mahjan مه جان
- Village
- Location within Iran
- Coordinates: 30°33′04″N 52°19′47″E
- Country: Iran
- Province: Fars
- County: Eqlid
- Bakhsh: Sedeh
- Rural District: Aspas

Population (2006)
  - Total: 513
- Time zone: UTC+3:30 (IRST)
  - Summer (DST): UTC+4:30 (IRDT)

Mahjan (Persian: مه جان, also romanized as Mahjān and Mah Jān; also known as Mahgān, Maigān, and Meygān) is a village in Aspas Rural District, Sedeh District, Eqlid County, Fars province, Iran. At the 2006 census, its population was 513, in 101 families.
