= Qatar Aghaj =

Qatar Aghaj (Persian: قطاراغاج), also rendered as Ghatar Aghaj or Qatar Aqaj, may refer to:

- Qatar Aghaj, Fars
- Qatar Aghaj, Hamadan
- Qatar Aghaj, Markazi
