= Pahnay Behi =

Pahnay Behi پهناي بهي
- Village
- Location within Iran
- Coordinates: 30°38′03″N 51°52′36″E
- Country: Iran
- Province: Fars
- County: Eqlid
- Bakhsh: Sedeh
- Rural District: Dezhkord

Population (2006)
  - Total: 297
- Time zone: UTC+3:30 (IRST)
  - Summer (DST): UTC+4:30 (IRDT)

Pahnay Behi (Persian: پهناي بهي, also Romanized as Pahnāy Behī; also known as Pahnābehī and Pahneh Behī) is a village in Dezhkord Rural District, Sedeh District, Eqlid County, Fars province, Iran. At the 2006 census, its population was 297, in 61 families.
