= Kharestan-e Sofla =

Kharestan-e Sofla (Persian: خارستان سفلی) may refer to:

- Kharestan-e Sofla, Fars
- Kharestan-e Sofla, Khuzestan
