= Kharestan-e Olya, Fars =

Kharestan-e Olya خارستان عليا
- Village
- Location within Iran
- Coordinates: 30°38′35″N 51°54′22″E
- Country: Iran
- Province: Fars
- County: Eqlid
- Bakhsh: Sedeh
- Rural District: Dezhkord

Population (2006)
  - Total: 255
- Time zone: UTC+3:30 (IRST)
  - Summer (DST): UTC+4:30 (IRDT)

Kharestan-e Olya (Persian: خارستان عليا, also Romanized as Khārestān-e 'Olyā and Khārastān 'Olyá; also known as Khārestān and Khārestān-e Bālā) is a village in Dezhkord Rural District, Sedeh District, Eqlid County, Fars province, Iran. At the 2006 census, its population was 255, in 64 families.
