= Bugár =

Bugár is a Hungarian surname. It also often appears in Slovakia (feminine: Bugárová). Notable people with the surname include:

- Arnold Bugár (born 1971), Slovak gymnast
- Béla Bugár (born 1958), Slovak politician
- Imrich Bugár (1955–2026), Czechoslovak discus thrower

== See also ==
- Bugar
- Javadiyeh-ye Bugar
