= Sedeh District =

Sedeh District may refer to:

- Sedeh District (Fars Province)
- Sedeh District (Qaen County), South Khorasan province

== See also ==
- Sedeh Rural District (disambiguation)
