= Rahmatabad, Eqlid =

Rahmatabad رحمت اباد
- Village
- Location within Iran
- Coordinates: 30°35′43″N 52°20′38″E
- Country: Iran
- Province: Fars
- County: Eqlid
- Bakhsh: Sedeh
- Rural District: Aspas

Population (2006)
  - Total: 548
- Time zone: UTC+3:30 (IRST)
  - Summer (DST): UTC+4:30 (IRDT)

Rahmatabad (Persian: رحمت اباد, also Romanized as Raḩmatābād; also known as Āzādegān and Raḩmatābād-e Āzādegān) is a village in Aspas Rural District, Sedeh District, Eqlid County, Fars province, Iran. At the 2006 census, its population was 548, in 128 families.
