= Baseri Aqajan =

Baseri Aqajan باصري اقاجان
- Village
- Location within Iran
- Coordinates: 30°41′40″N 51°58′30″E
- Country: Iran
- Province: Fars
- County: Eqlid
- Bakhsh: Sedeh
- Rural District: Dezhkord

Population (2006)
  - Total: 142
- Time zone: UTC+3:30 (IRST)
  - Summer (DST): UTC+4:30 (IRDT)

Baseri Aqajan (Persian: باصري اقاجان, also Romanized as Bāşerī Āqājān and Bāserī Āqājān) is a village in Dezhkord Rural District, Sedeh District, Eqlid County, Fars province, Iran. At the 2006 census, its population was 142, in 37 families.
