= Kharestan-e Olya =

Kharestan-e Olya or Kharastan Olya (Persian: خارستان عليا) may refer to:

- Kharestan-e Olya, Fars
- Kharestan-e Olya, Khuzestan
