= Baseri Hadi =

Baseri Hadi باصري هادي
- Village
- Location within Iran
- Coordinates: 30°41′16″N 52°00′08″E
- Country: Iran
- Province: Fars
- County: Eqlid
- Bakhsh: Sedeh
- Rural District: Dezhkord

Population (2006)
  - Total: 248
- Time zone: UTC+3:30 (IRST)
  - Summer (DST): UTC+4:30 (IRDT)

Baseri Hadi (Persian: باصري هادي, also Romanized as Bāşerī Hādī; also known as Bāsīrī, Bāsīrī Hādī, Bāsīrī-ye Hādī, Bāsīrīyeh-ye Hādī, and Hādī) is a village in Dezhkord Rural District, Sedeh District, Eqlid County, Fars province, Iran. At the 2006 census, its population was 248, in 46 families.
