= Hajjiabad, Eqlid =

Village in Fars province, Iran

Hajjiabad Persian: حاجي اباد
- Village
- Location within Iran
- Coordinates: 30°39′51″N 52°17′43″E
- Country: Iran
- Province: Fars
- County: Eqlid
- District: Sedeh
- Rural District: Sedeh

Population (2016)
  - Total: 419
- Time zone: UTC+3:30 (IRST)

Hajjiabad (Persian: حاجي اباد,) (Note: Also romanized as Ḩājīābād and Hājjīabād; also known as Ḩājābād) is a village in Sedeh Rural District, Sedeh District, Eqlid County, Fars province, Iran.

== Demographics ==
=== Population ===
At the time of the 2006 National Census, the village's population was 374 in 77 households. The following census in 2011 counted 429 people in 117 households. The 2016 census measured the population of the village as 419 people in 120 households. It was the most populous village in its rural district.
