= Azadegan (disambiguation) =

Azadegan is an oil field in Iran.

Azadegan may also refer to:

- Azadegan, Iran (disambiguation), a list of villages in Iran
- Azadegan League, a football league
- Azadegan Rural District (disambiguation), an administrative subdivision
- Azadegan Organization, an Iranian monarchist organisation

== See also ==
- Dasht-e Azadegan (disambiguation)
