= Baserri =

Basque traditional housebarn farmhouse

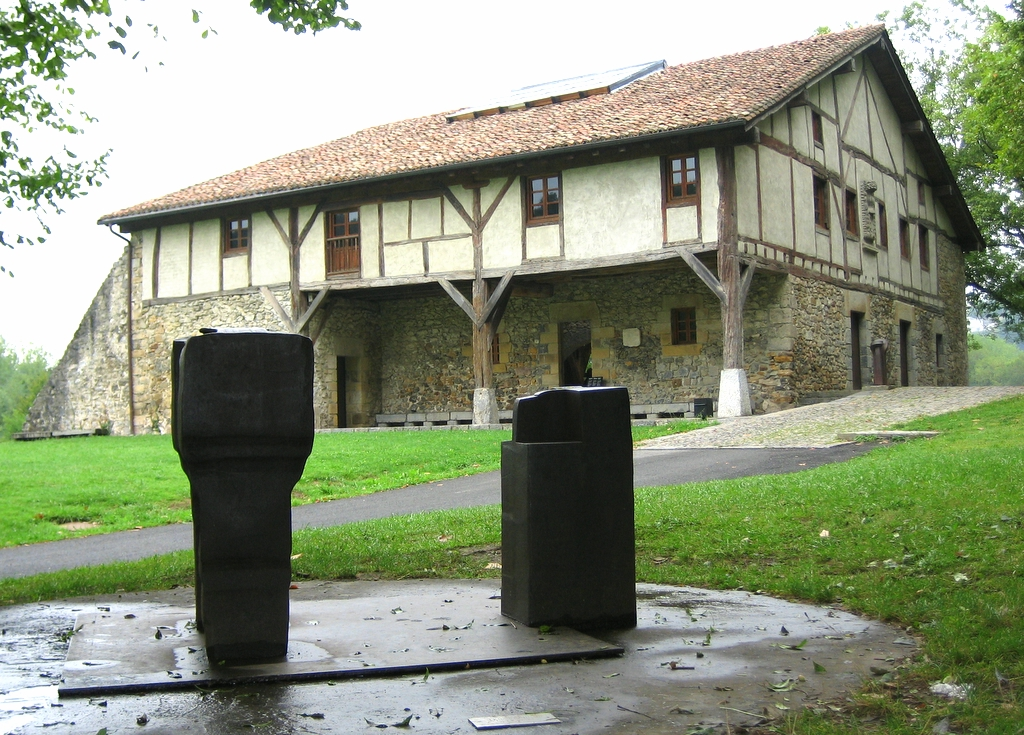
The baserri at the Chillida Museum in Hernani

A baserri (Basque pronunciation: [bas̺eri]; Spanish: caserío vasco; French: maison basque) is a traditional half-timbered or stone-built type of housebarn farmhouse found in the Basque Country in northern Spain and Southwestern France. The baserris, with their gently sloping roofs and entrance portals, are highly characteristic of the region and form a vital part in traditional Basque societal structures. They are also seen to have played an important role in protecting the Basque language in periods of persecution by providing the language with a very dispersed but substantial speaker base.

== Origins and historical development ==
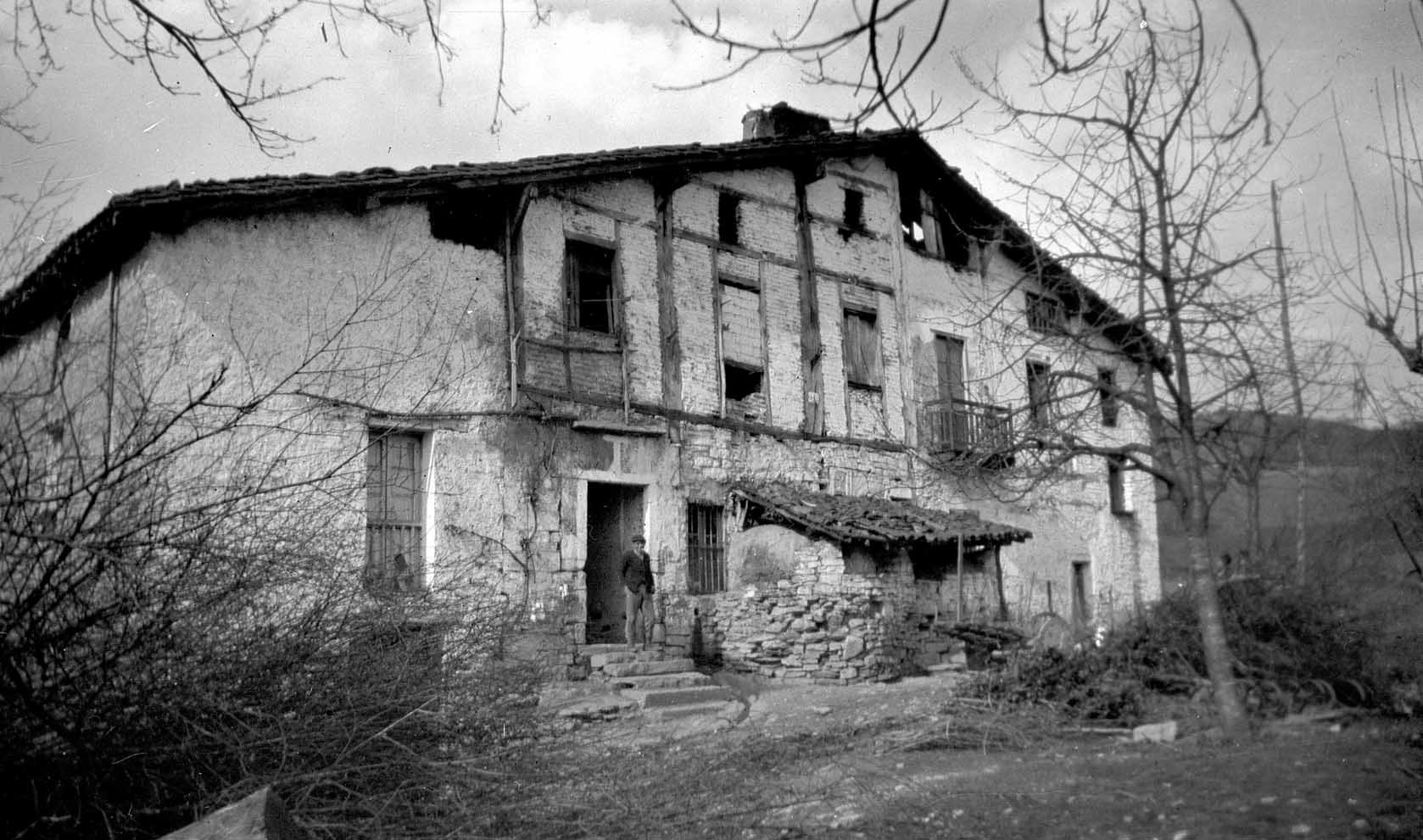
The half-timbered baserri of Lizarralde in Bergara. This is a hiruarriko with the extension on the left of the main building.

The term baserri is derived from the roots basa "wild" and herri "settlement" and denotes a farmstead not located in a village or town. People who live on a baserri are referred to as baserritarrak (Basque pronunciation: [bas̺eritarak]), a term which contrasts with kaletarrak (Basque pronunciation: [kaletarak]) (street people), i.e., people who live in a town or city.

The present-day term baserri in Basque has a fairly restricted meaning, denoting the building and its occupants, especially in the Gipuzkoan dialect. Originally, however, it denoted the building (still called in some places baserri-etxea 'baserri house'), its dwellers and the whole estate. The originally wide connotation of the term is related to the inherent ambiguity of the Basque word herri which can be translated as "land", "home", "people" or "settlement" depending on the context.

In Spanish, mostly the term caserío vasco is used but note that a caserío may also denote an entire settlement in parts of the Spanish speaking world. In French, the term maison basque is commonly encountered, although this overlaps to some extent with the Basque concept of etxea (the house).

Overall, they are almost non-existent in the flatter terrains of Álava and central and southern Navarre (Ager Vasconum). These areas went through a more thorough period of Romanisation, in which the ancient Roman fundi provided the grounds for the new small population clusters and villages that dotted the whole region at the turn of the first millennium, after Muslim raids stopped. They are often named after an old landowner, e.g. Barbarin, Andoin, Amatrain, etc. In Navarre, parts of Álava and parts of the Northern Basque Country, baserris often form rather spaced out settlements, but virtually never wall-to-wall to minimise fire risks. Baserris in Gipuzkoa and Biscay on the whole are solitary buildings, but generally within view of another baserri.

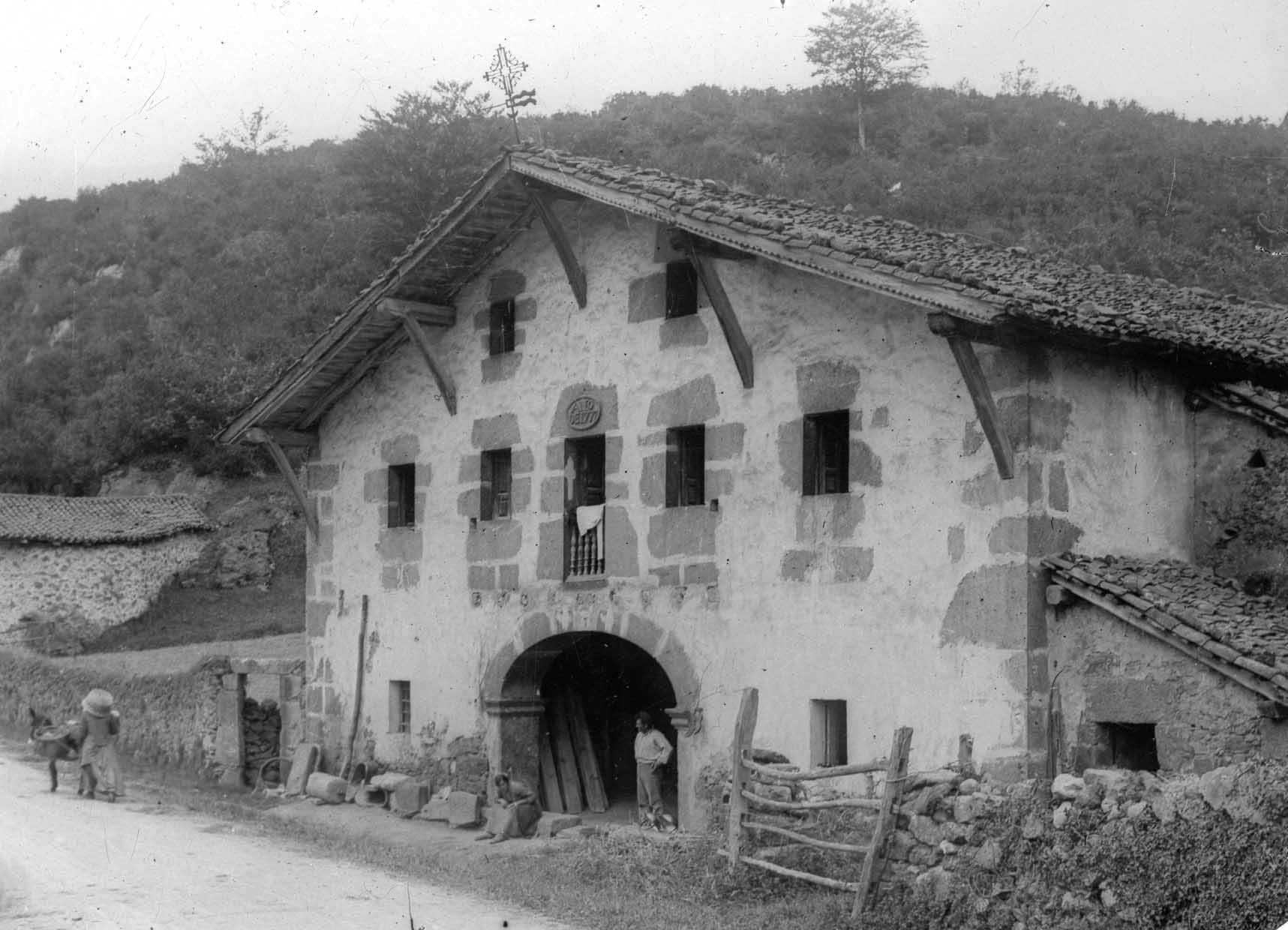
A stone-built baserri in Gizaburuaga.

The predecessor of the baserri was the farming community of the late Middle Ages in the hilly Atlantic area, who at one point had learnt and taken up sowing and harvesting (cf. the legend of San Martin Txiki). The families didn't live in baserri buildings as we know today, but in clusters of small wooden fragile shacks with room enough for the family, the cattle and the stored hay. However, the press house, granaries, pigsty and sheepfolds were located in separate buildings. At this stage, the baserri stands clearly for the whole community behind the economic unit. This period also saw the development of the linguistic counterpart to the baserri for religious matters, the baseliza or "wild church".

During the 14th and 15th century, as the population began to grow, agricultural activity increased and so did the linking of agricultural activities and animal husbandry on a baserri, leading to an increase in the number of baserris. The late 15th and the 16th century are a period of peace among warring nobiliary factions after years of clashes, in which exactions and abuses on farmers had been rife, leading to a time of optimism and stability. The American and Andalusian conquest opened new opportunities, with small fortunes made by Basque venturers, which propelled the construction of baserris, thriving in the hundreds. Maize from the Americas substituted less productive millet, taking its Basque name arto. While private land ownership had been known if not widespread in the southern parts of Álava and Navarre since Roman times, most land further north was still common land in this period. Councils fostered the building activity with tax exemption on tree chopping for baserri construction, which enabled Basque farmers to develop swathes of common land into privately owned baserris. Several of these new baserris were named simply Etxeberria, "the new house".

At this transitional stage, the baserri buildings consisted of timbered structures that are barely reminiscent of dwellings, made up often in oak from the surrounding forests. In fact, the central position in the house was occupied by the press, since cider was a very important economic activity for the family's economy. Then, families started to move in for the initially cider producing mill, cattle stall and granary, eventually complementing or even replacing its original function with the dwelling. A well-known example of this type of baserri is the Igartubeiti baserri (built 1530), now an interactive museum and exhibition space, hosting events related to cider making (e.g. txalaparta) and traditional rural life.

The first stone farmhouses in Gipuzkoa (which entailed timber frames anyway) were built during the 15th century and brought admiration and envy from their neighbours. Only the richest farmers could permit themselves the luxury of building a house "de cal y canto" ("of lime and stone"), paying a team of stonemasons who dug out and worked the stone. Oakwood was, on the other hand, cheap and available. The increased building activity led to some of the earliest recorded environmental laws concerning de- and reforestation, such as the law passed by the Batzar of Azkoitia in 1657 which forbade the cutting of young trees and required anyone felling a tree to plant two new trees in its place.

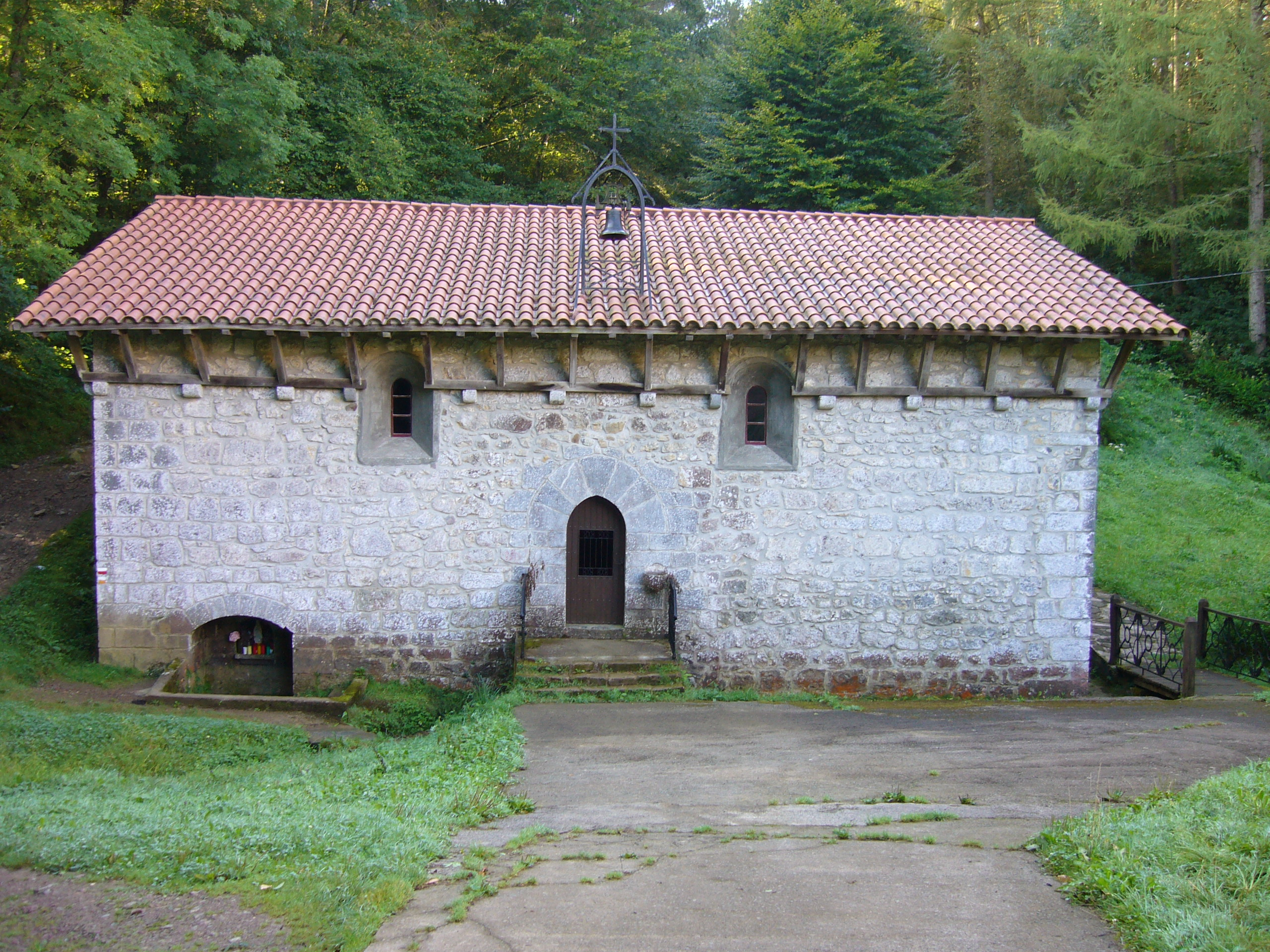
The Baseliza (hermitage) of Iturriotz in Aia.

In the Northern Basque Country these are often called borda, a term that originally referred to shepherding shelters. The extension, both structurally and terminologically, of the term to refer to a farmhouse rather than shelter occurred in the 17th and 18th century when further increases in the population led to the development of such summer pasture shelters into farmhouses.

The 17th century is also the last period in which baserris with half-timbered façades were constructed. Later constructions are virtually all in solid stone (except for the central section above the recessed portal to avoid structural problems). From the 18th century onwards, the remaining half-timbered elements were replaced by using stone arches above the entrances.

== Significance ==
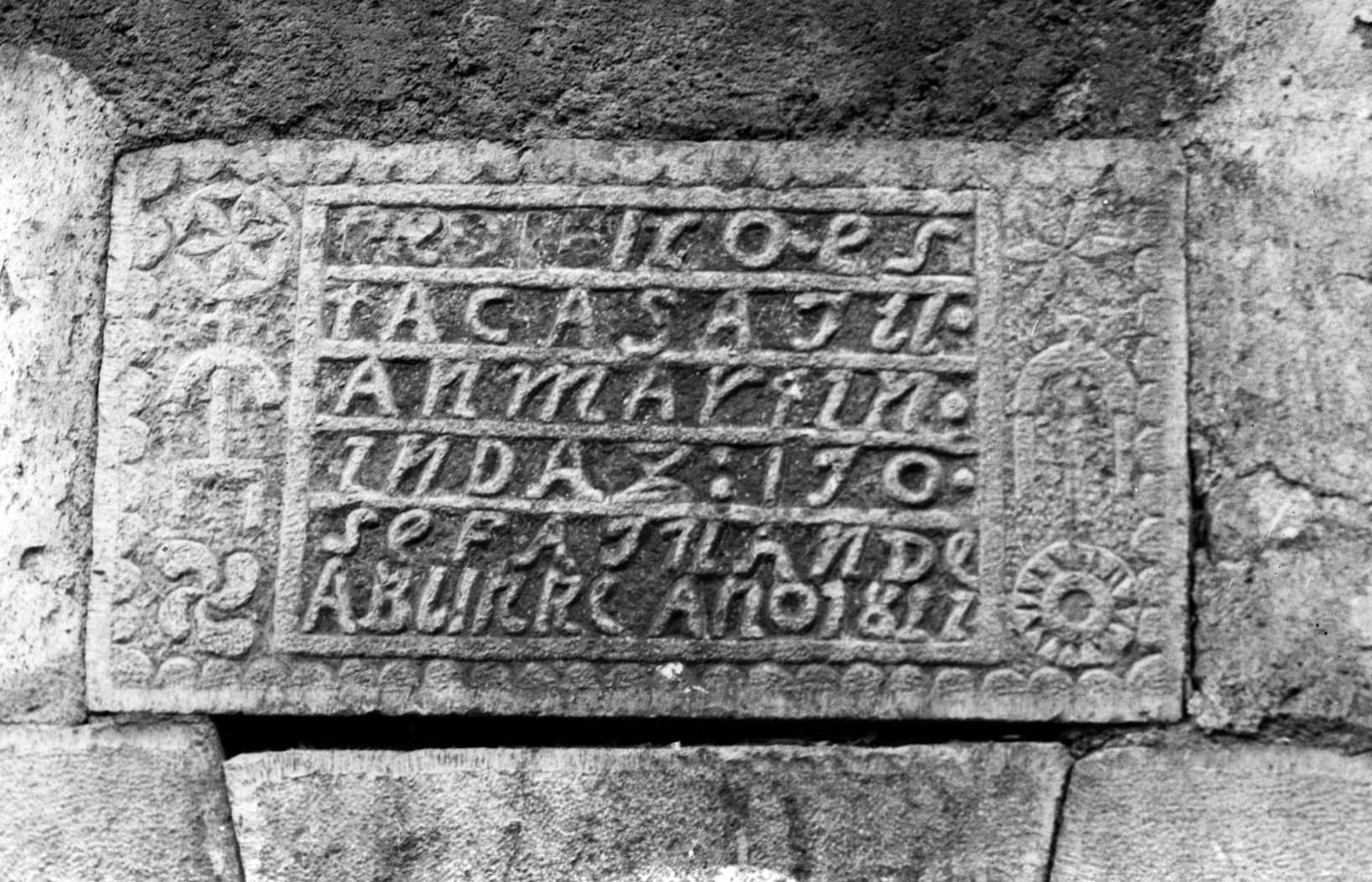
The lintel stone above a baserri in Aria; note the lauburu on the bottom left and the sun symbol on the bottom right

A baserri represents the core unit of traditional Basque society, as the ancestral home of a family. Traditionally, the household is administered by the etxekoandre (lady of the house) and the etxekojaun (master of the house), each with distinctly defined rights, roles and responsibilities. When the couple reaches a certain age upon which they wish to retire, the baserri is formally handed over to a child. Unusually, the parents were by tradition free to choose any child, male or female, firstborn or later born, to assume the role of etxekoandre or etxekojaun to ensure the child most suitable to the role would inherit the ancestral home.

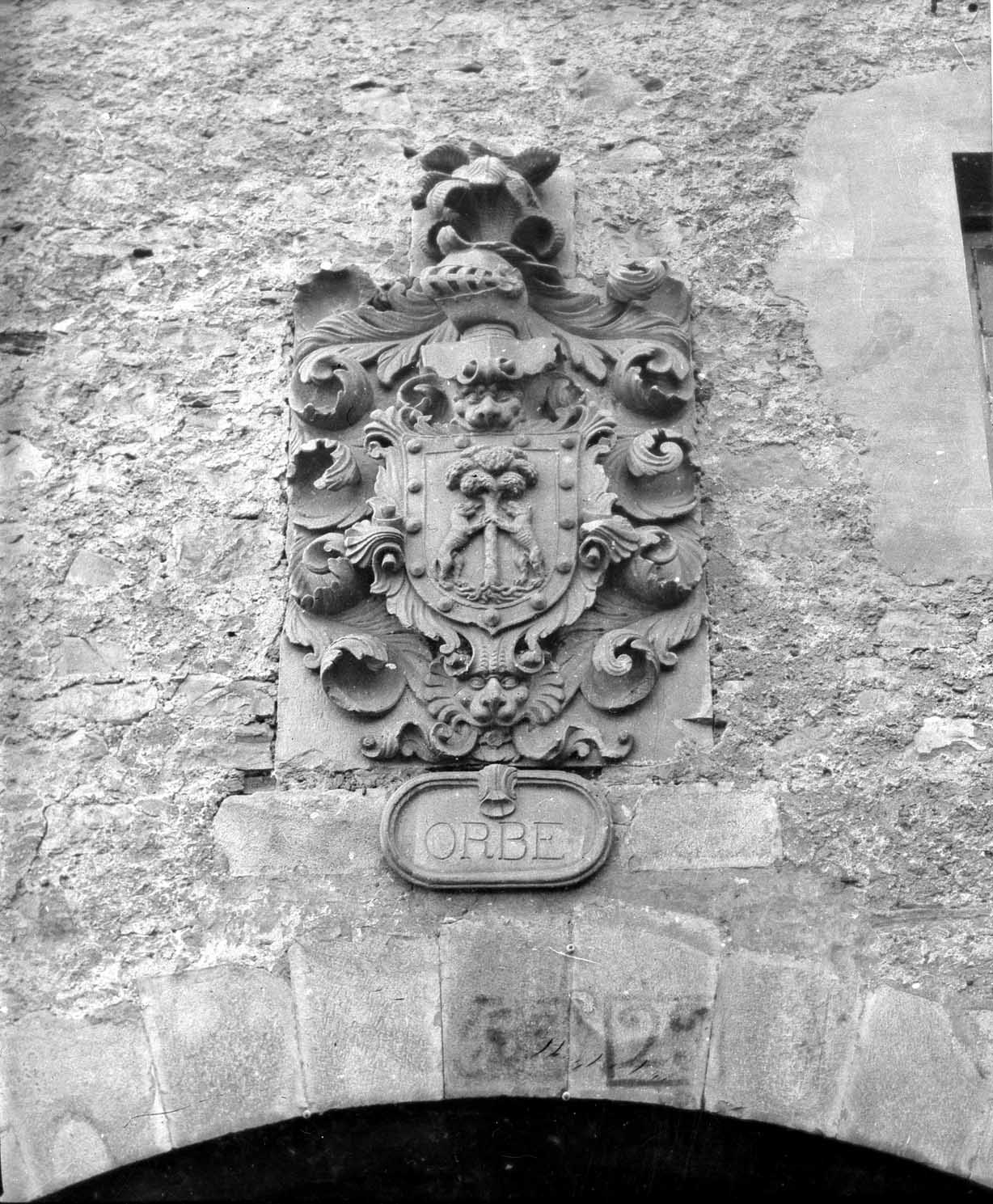
The crest stone above the Orbe baserri in Angiozar, Spain, displaying the coat of arms of the Marquessate of Valdespina

The baserri under traditional law (the fueros) cannot be divided or inherited by more than one person. This is still the case in the Southern Basque Country but the introduction of the Napoleonic Code in France, under which such practices are illegal, greatly upset this tradition in the North. Although the Basques in the north chose to be "creative" with the new laws, it overall resulted in the breakup and ultimate financial ruin of many baserris.

In practice the tradition of not breaking up baserris meant that the remaining children had to marry into another baserri, stay on the family baserri as unmarried employees or make their own way in the world (Iglesia o mar o casa real, "Church or sea or royal house").

As such, most baserris have a large stone-carved sign built into the front wall called armarriak (crest-stones) and a decorative lintel stone above the entrance called ate-buru or atalburu (door head). The lintel stone usually states who built the house and the year in which it was built. The armarria either states the name of the village or valley or the family's surname and is often in the style of a coat of arms, a sign of the universal gentry enjoyed in Biscay. The latter practice of displaying the surname is mostly found in the Southern Basque Country. Both are often also carved with Basque symbols, many of them pre-Christian, such as the lauburu, animals, plants and mythical figures.

Many Basque surnames stem from place-names and more especially from baserris. However, these surnames are deceptively older than the baserri-etxe, i.e. the baserri building, referring to the community and site preceding the building.

A considerable number also have apple-presses and barrel storage facilities built into the structure of the baserri for the production of Basque cider.

== Structure ==
Although different building styles exist with features specific to each region, most share a common core design. Most have three floors with stables within the building and a gently sloping roof, stone supporting walls and internal constructions made largely from wood.

=== Basic types ===
The baserri is designed to be modular in the sense that additional wings can be added onto the primary structure to allow the building to be extended if necessary. The core building is referred to as biarriko ("two stone one"), comprising two main supporting walls; a hiruharriko ("three stone one") with an extension on one side and a lauarriko ("four stone one") with two extensions, one on either side of the original building.

=== Floorplan ===
The floorplan is almost invariably rectangular, with a narrow end forming the façade. The façade usually has windows on all three floors and at least one large entrance, often two.

The conventional floor distribution usually has:

- The stables for cattle on the ground floor on one side of the building, the kitchen, washroom and sitting room on the other
- Sleeping quarters on the first floor, usually above the stable to minimise the need for heating. On the outside, this floor often also has one or more balconies.
- A large attic for storing produce and indoor activities requiring more space; this attic space is often open or partially open to the outside on the front of the house to ensure ventilation.

=== Kitchen and ovens ===
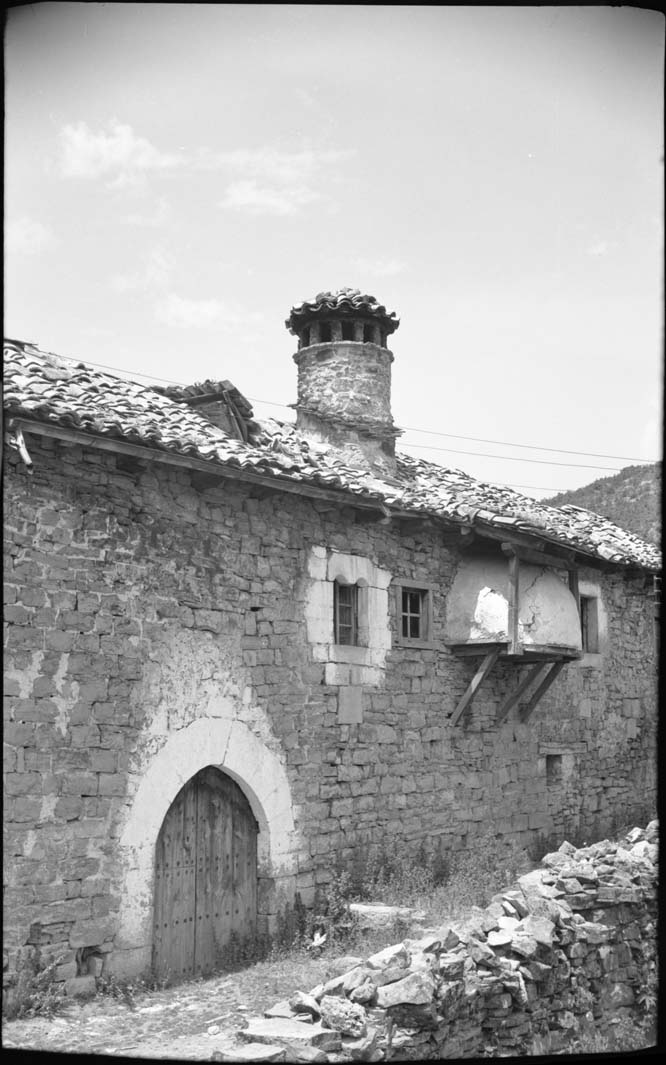
Labrit Extea in Itzalle with an external oven on the first floor.

Indoors, the kitchen (sukalde in Basque) was the centre of activity and social interaction. Originally the fire was located in the centre of the kitchen (similar to Scottish blackhouses) with a wall-mounted iron rotatable arm but were eventually replaced by fireplaces built into the wall with a chimney.

Although commonly encountered on the ground floor, it is not uncommon for kitchens to be located on the 1st floor. If this was the case in the colder regions of the Basque Country, the compulsory bread oven was built on a little balcony, with only the opening facing into the kitchen to minimise fire risks. In the more temperate regions, the bread oven was usually separate from the main baserri building.

=== Roof ===
Historically, the roofing material was wood shingles made from beechwood but today in most regions baserri have tiled roofs. The Basque surname Telletxea ("the tile house") is seen to stem from that era when terracotta tiles replaced the earlier shingled roofs and the first person to have a tiled roof being singled out for this fact. Wood-shingle roofs mainly survive in the mountainous parts of Navarre and Soule suffering from high snowfall, as wooden roofs allow for more steeply angled roofs which prevent buildup of snow.

The eaves are characteristically large, in particular on the front façades, but usually much smaller or non-existent on the opposite side. To reduce wind resistance, the north-facing aspect of the roof is often built in a style called miru-buztana (kite tail) - essentially a hip-roof.

=== Entrance portal and façade ===
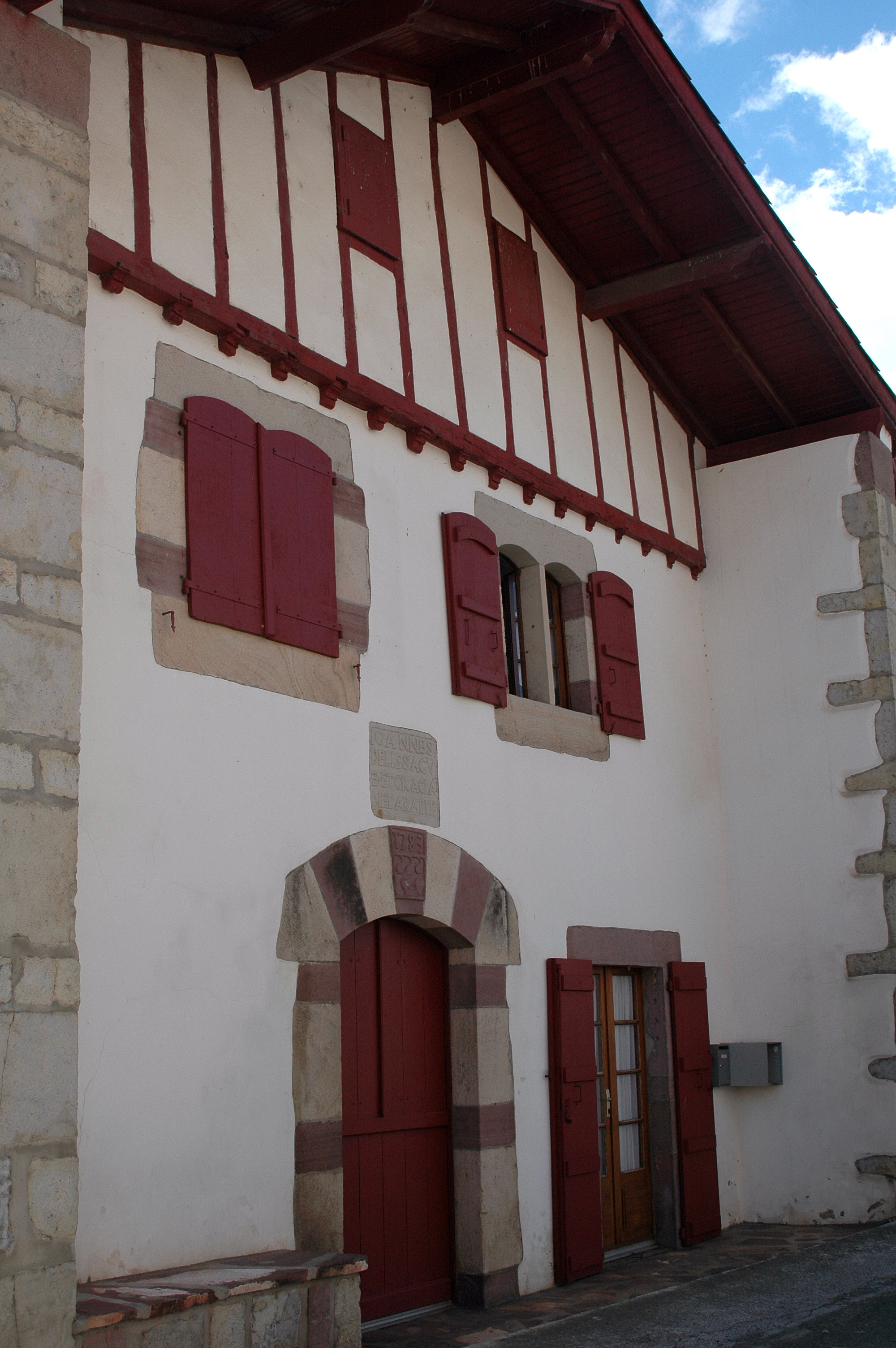
An urban baserri with red-stained wood in Ortzaize. Note also the lack of a recessed portal.

On older baserris, the entrance portal can take up up to a third of the façade's surface, often requiring one or more supporting pillars. It almost invariably faces south-east (i.e. opposite to the weather side) and irrespective of the views. Along with the disappearance of half-timbered façades in the 18th Century, the portals which were originally built in wood gradually disappeared and were replaced by stone-built portals.

The wood in half-timbered façades was traditionally stained red with a paint made from olive oil, ochre and ox blood, although today commercial paints are often used. The white between the timbers was achieved by painting the surface with lime plaster.

The portal (ataria in Basque) had a central role in the everyday life of the baserritarras, being home to activities ranging from a wide variety of social activities to grinding flour and animal slaughtering.

In areas where baserris grouped together in loose settlements, the portal was transformed into a large doorway, usually with a two-wing door which was also split horizontally.

=== Granaries ===
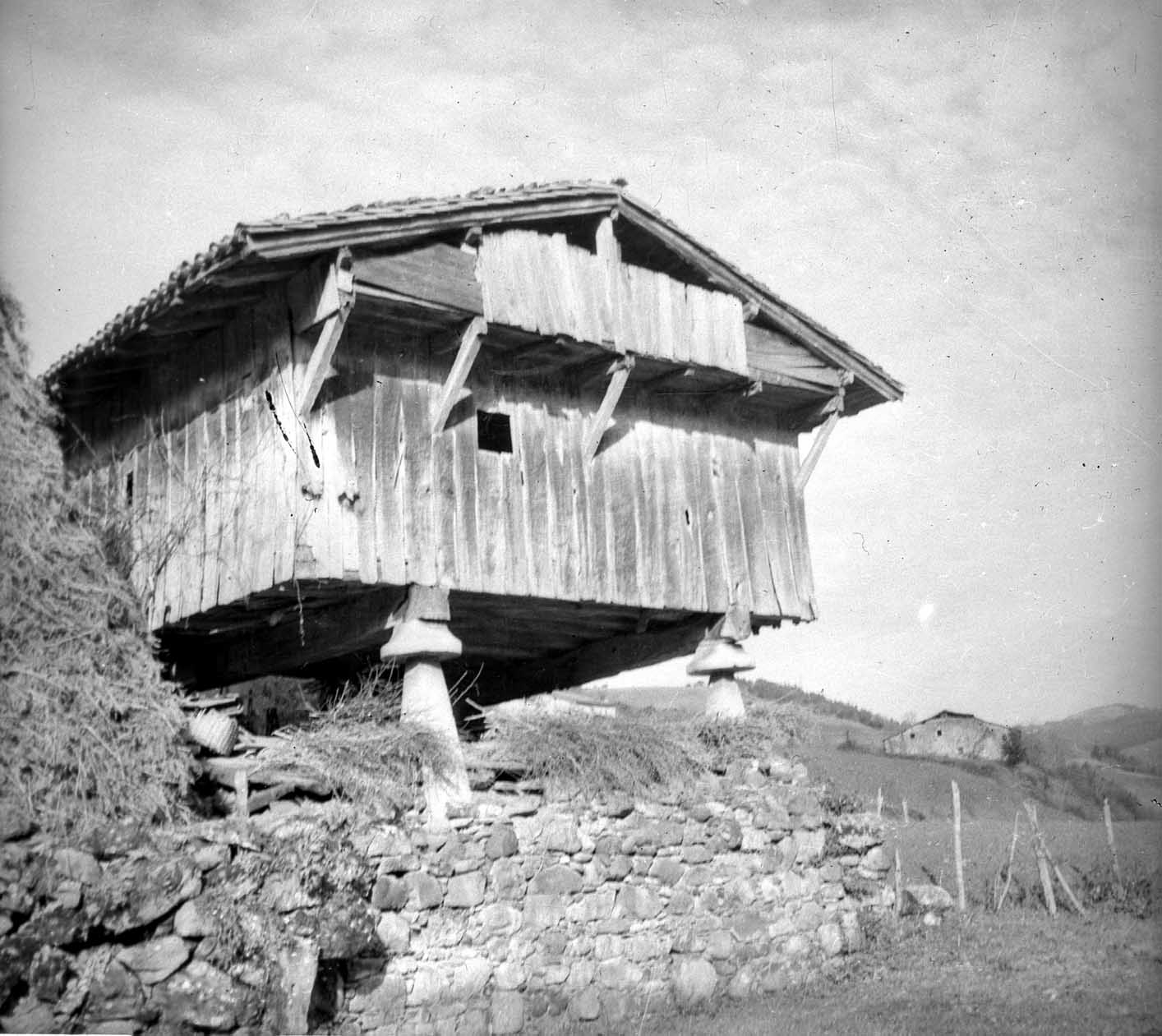
The granary in of the Ibarguren baserri in Markina-Xemein.

Although on most baserris produce is stored inside the main building, some have stand-alone granaries called garai in Basque. These are small, wooden or stone-built structures on staddle stones and very reminiscent of such granaries in other parts of the world.

== Tower farmhouses ==
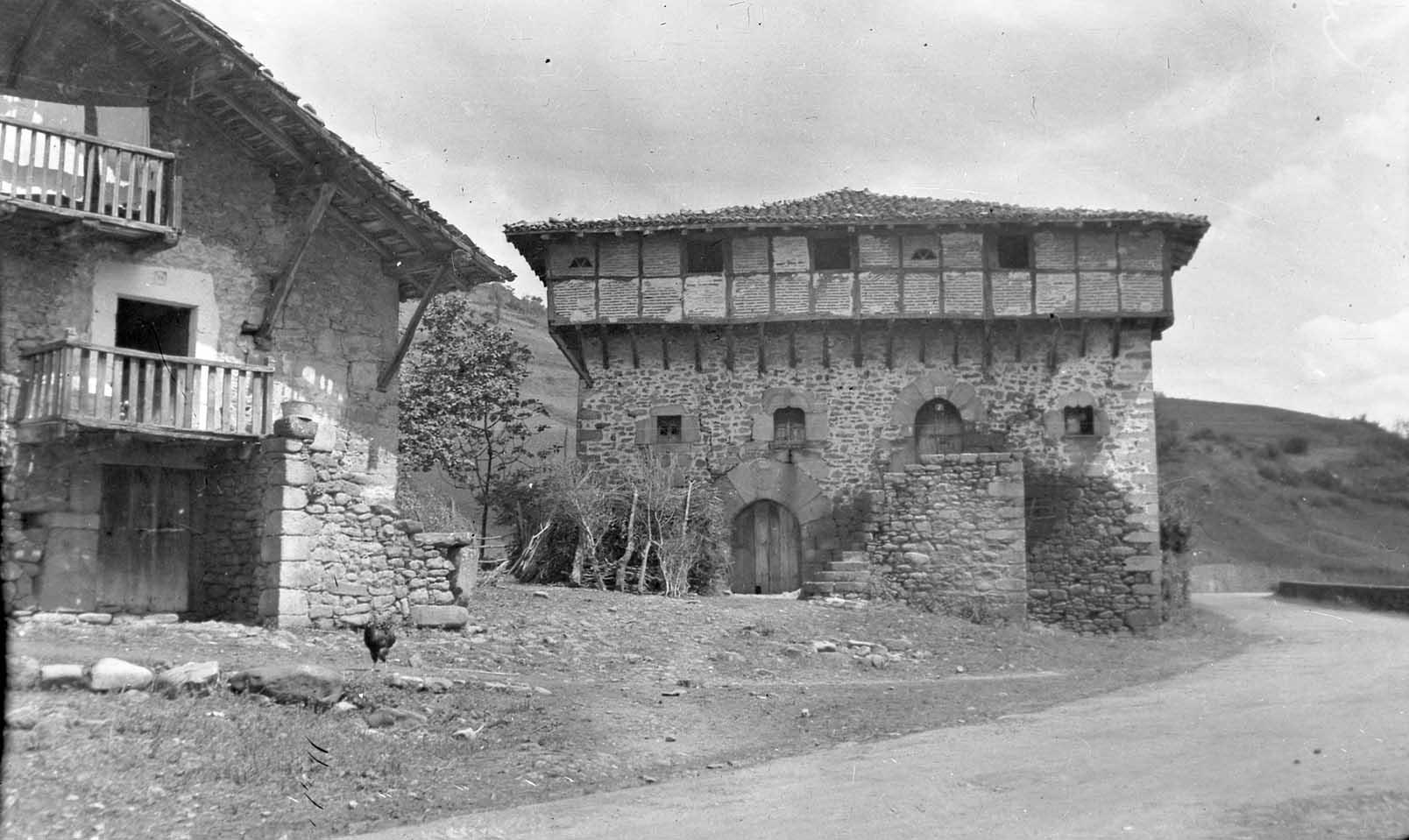
The Aranguren baserri in Orozko, converted from a fortified tower.

Some baserris seem to defy the normal definition of a baserri. In many cases, these are the result of the Juntas Generales of Biscay and Gipuzkoa ordering the tower houses (dorretxeak in Basque) razed following centuries of Basque partisan wars. Many were converted into non-military buildings, resulting in rather unusual baserris.

== Modern developments ==
Traditionally, agricultural and pastoral activities formed the mainstay of the inhabitants of a baserri but due to recent economic and societal changes, agrotourism has also become a major activity on baserris.

== Traditions and superstitions ==
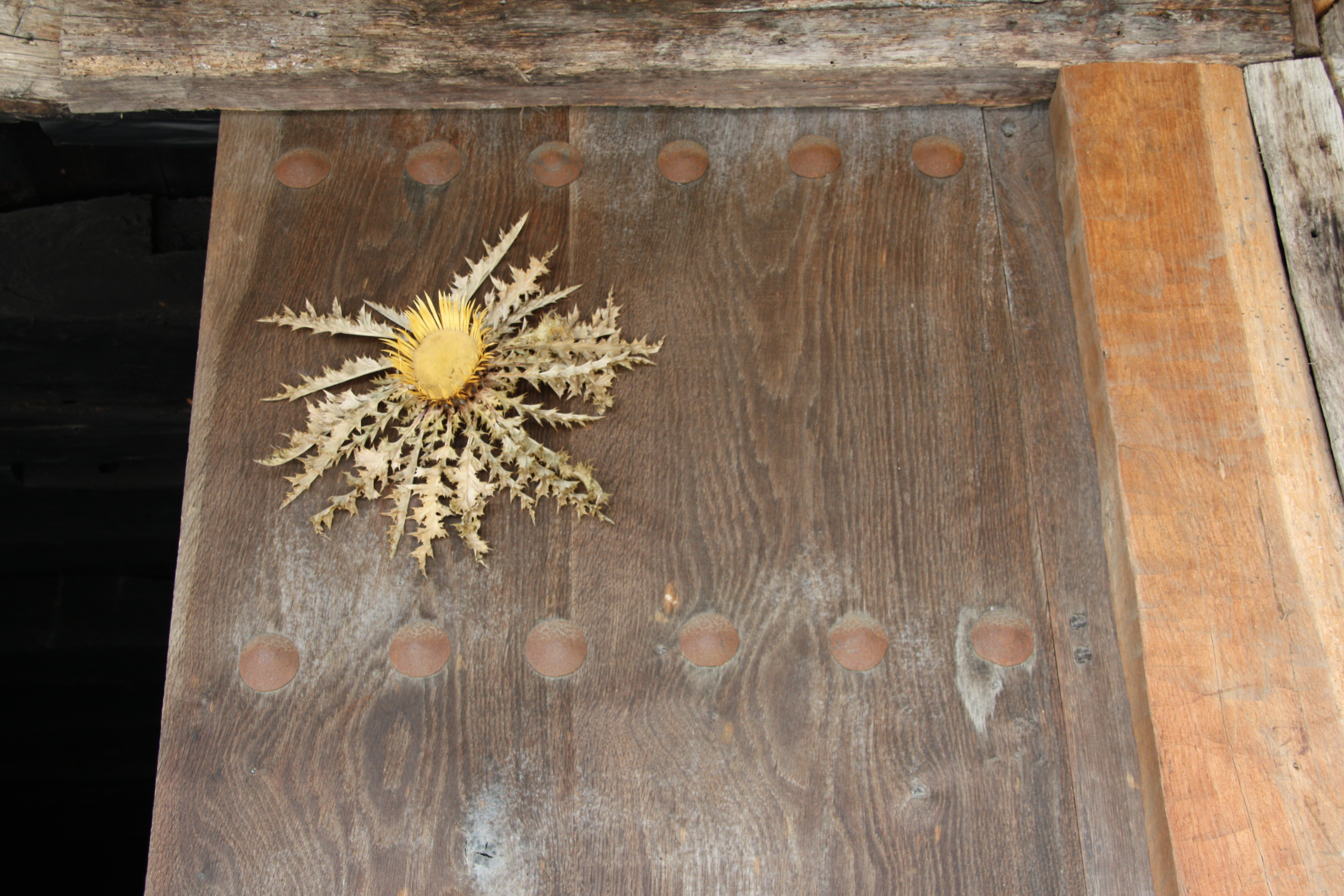
A silver thistle on the door of the Igartubeiti baserri.

Various cultural traditions and superstitions surround the baserri.

One is the habit of fixing dried silver thistles (called eguzkilore or "sunflower" in Basque, not to be confused with sunflowers, called ekilore) to the doors of a baserri for good fortune. Folklore has it that certain unwelcome spirits such as laminas, witches or devils only operate at night and attaching this flower to the door would lead these beings to assume the sun was shining on the baserri and therefore stay away. By a similar extension of belief, they were also supposed to protect against lightning strikes and storm damage.

== See also ==
- Atalburu
- Hilarri
