= Javadiyeh-ye Bugar =

Javadiyeh-ye Bugar جواديه بوگر
- Village
- Location within Iran
- Coordinates: 30°42′13″N 51°57′15″E
- Country: Iran
- Province: Fars
- County: Eqlid
- Bakhsh: Sedeh
- Rural District: Dezhkord

Population (2006)
  - Total: 276
- Time zone: UTC+3:30 (IRST)
  - Summer (DST): UTC+4:30 (IRDT)

Javadiyeh-ye Bugar (Persian: جواديه بوگر, also Romanized as Javādīyeh-ye Būgar; also known as Javādīyeh) is a village in Dezhkord Rural District, Sedeh District, Eqlid County, Fars province, Iran. At the 2006 census, its population was 276, in 57 families.
