= Qatar Aghaj, Fars =

Qatar Aghaj قطاراغاج
- Village
- Location within Iran
- Coordinates: 30°43′13″N 51°53′26″E
- Country: Iran
- Province: Fars
- County: Eqlid
- Bakhsh: Sedeh
- Rural District: Dezhkord

Population (2006)
  - Total: 147
- Time zone: UTC+3:30 (IRST)
  - Summer (DST): UTC+4:30 (IRDT)

Qatar Aghaj (Persian: قطاراغاج, also Romanized as Qaţār Āghāj) is a village in Dezhkord Rural District, Sedeh District, Eqlid County, Fars province, Iran. At the 2006 census, its population was 147, in 29 families.
