= Atalburu =

Basque decorative lintel

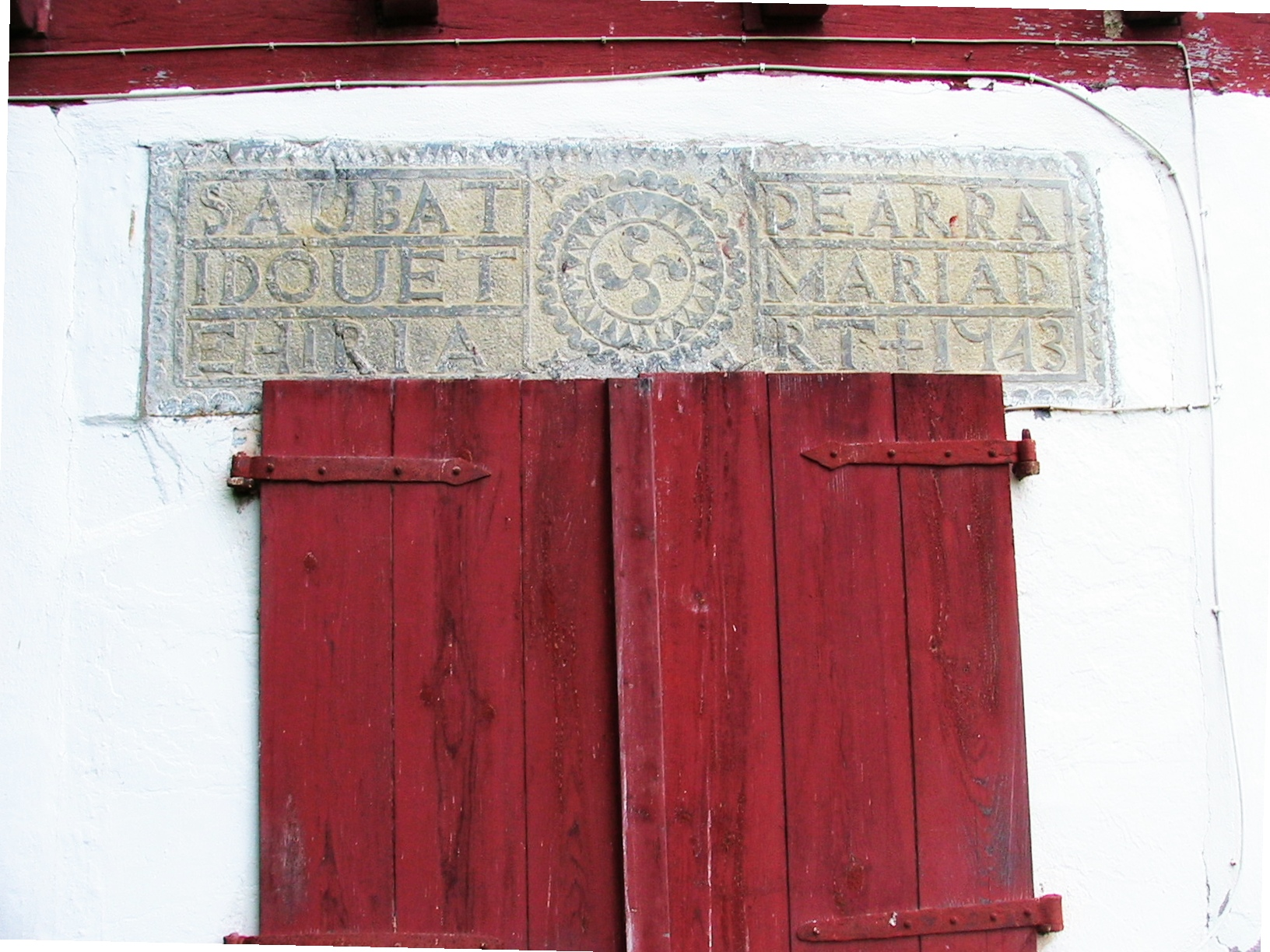
Saubat de Arraidou et Maria de Hiriart 1743 Atalburu in Lower Navarre with a lauburu and founders' names

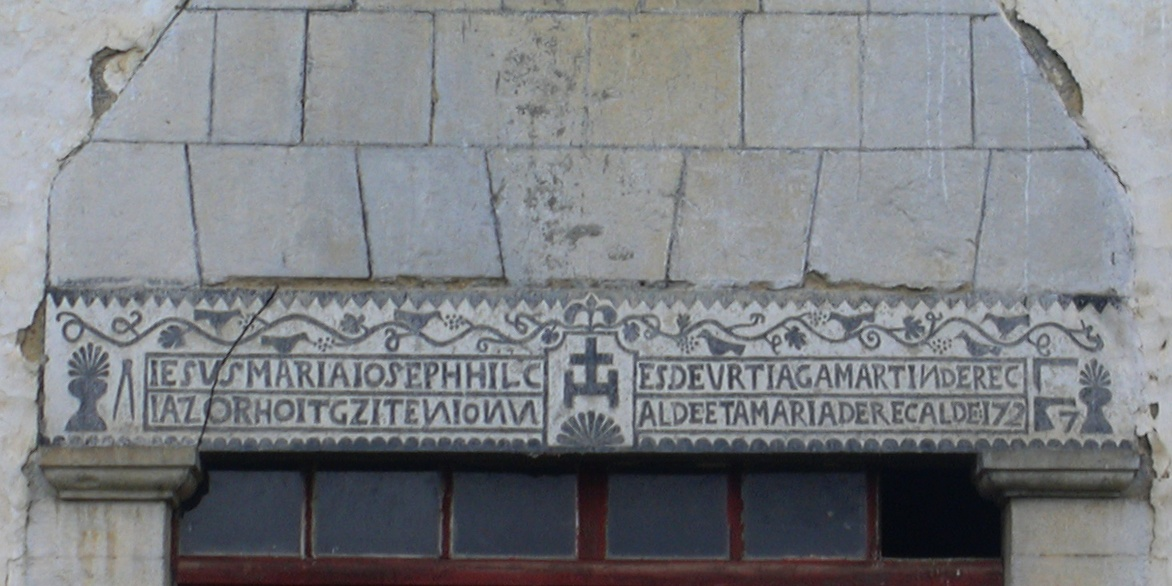
Iesus Maria Ioseph hilçiaz orhoitg-ziten Io(a)nnes de Urtiaga, Martin d'Errecalde et Maria d'Errecalde, 1727 (the first half translating as "In memory of JMJ's death")

Atalburu (from Basque atari 'doorway' buru 'head') is the name given to the lintel above the main entrance of traditional Basque houses. The lintel often contains dates relating to the history of the house.

It was usual for each new house, particularly in the province of Lower Navarre, to engrave on these stones:

- the year of construction,
- the name of spouses,
- religious symbols, as a cross,
- other traditional motives, as a lauburu or simply its constitutive commas, doves symbol of fidelity, stylized plants symbol of prosperity, rosettes of laurel leaves, symbol of immortality or various others as sun, stars...
- working tools

The text may have religious references, for example:

- Au nom du Père et du Fils et du St Esprit m'a fait bâtir l'an 1806 ('In the name of the Father and of the Son and of the Holy Gost, (one) made me build in year 1806')...

Traditionally, all Basque houses have a name, but this was seldom written on the atalarri and more commonly found on the armarria. On modern houses, the house name is frequently engraved on a stele near the door. Once a house is named, the name is virtually never changed.

== See also ==
- Baserri
- Hilarri
