= Kharestan-e Sofla, Fars =

Kharestan-e Sofla خارستان سفلی
- Village
- Location within Iran
- Coordinates: 30°38′15″N 51°55′05″E
- Country: Iran
- Province: Fars
- County: Eqlid
- Bakhsh: Sedeh
- Rural District: Dezhkord

Population (2006)
  - Total: 257
- Time zone: UTC+3:30 (IRST)
  - Summer (DST): UTC+4:30 (IRDT)

Kharestan-e Sofla (Persian: خارستان سفلی, also Romanized as Khārestān-e Soflá; also known as Khārestān-e Pā’īn) is a village in Dezhkord Rural District, Sedeh District, Eqlid County, Fars province, Iran. At the 2006 census, its population was 257, in 59 families.
