= Sedeh Rural District =

Sedeh Rural District (Persian: دهستان سده) may refer to:

- Sedeh Rural District (Fars Province)
- Sedeh Rural District (Markazi Province)
- Sedeh Rural District (Qaen County), South Khorasan province

== See also ==
- Sedeh District (disambiguation)
