= Tang-e Boraq =

Village in Fars province, Iran

Tang-e Boraq Persian: تنگ براق
- Village
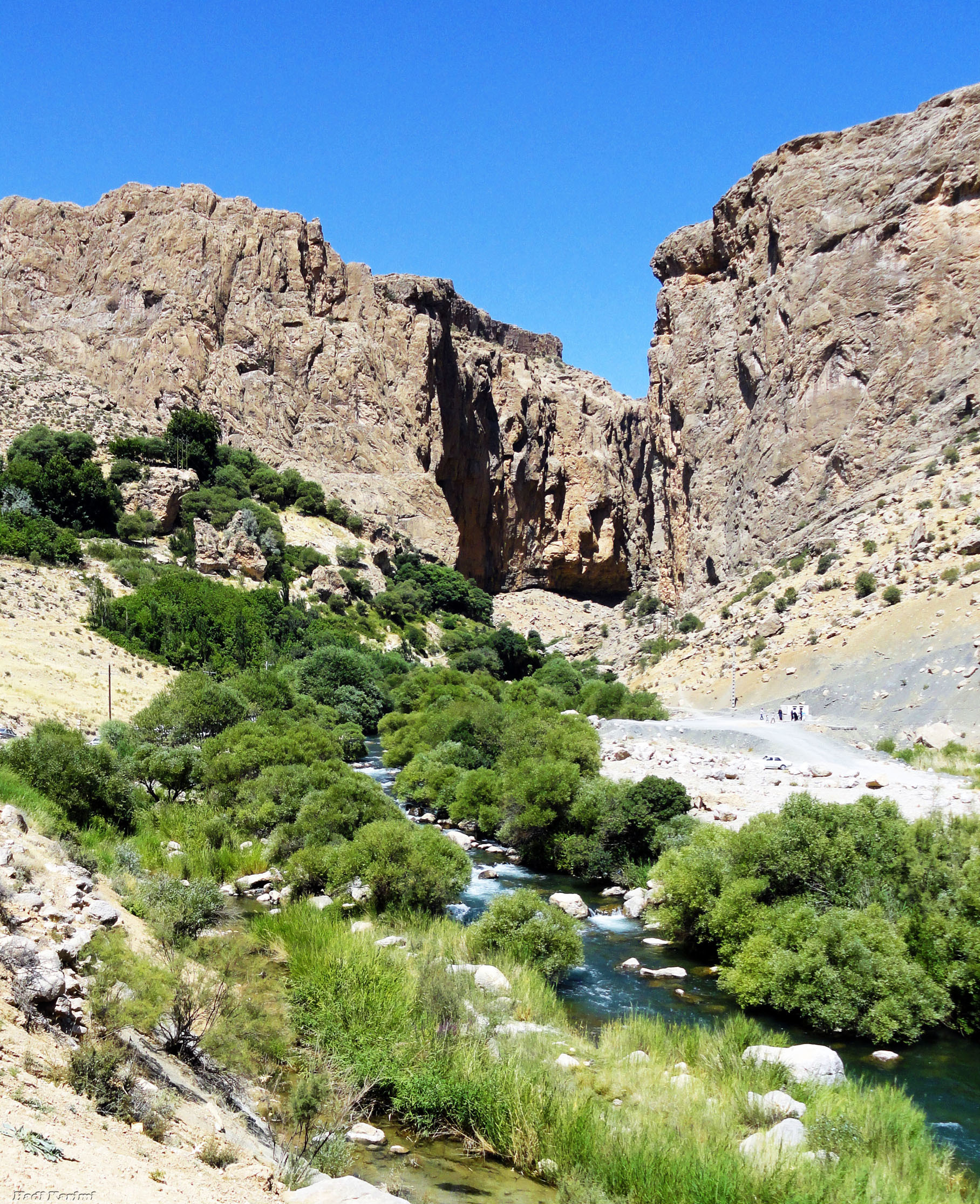
- Tang-e Boraq canyon

- Location within Iran
- Coordinates: 30°37′54″N 52°02′54″E
- Country: Iran
- Province: Fars
- County: Eqlid
- District: Sedeh
- Rural District: Dezhkord

Population (2016)
  - Total: 537
- Time zone: UTC+3:30 (IRST)

Tang-e Boraq (Persian: تنگ براق) (Note: Also romanized as Tang-e Borāq) is a village in Dezhkord Rural District, Sedeh District, Eqlid County, Fars province, Iran.

== Demographics ==
=== Population ===
At the time of the 2006 National Census, the village's population was 425 in 100 households. The following census in 2011 counted 528 people in 132 households. The 2016 census measured the population of the village as 537 people in 134 households. It was the most populous village in its rural district.
