= Borjgali =

Georgian symbol of the Sun

A borjgali (Georgian: ბორჯღალი, romanized: borjghali) is a Georgian symbol of the sun and eternity. The Borjgali is often represented with seven rotating wings over the tree of life which can be used to create various shapes and variations and is considered one of the main symbols of Georgian culture.

== History ==
Borjgali

The term borjgali translates to "the flow of time" from Megrelian borj "time" and gal "pass" or "flow". The word is believed to derive from the Megrelian term ბარჩხალი (barchkhali), which means "brilliance" or "glitter." Other scholars believe its origin is from Old Georgian ბურჯი (burji) "time" and "ღალ" (ghal) "holy fruit" or "harvest," together meaning "holy fruit sprouting from time."

This pre-Christian symbol was widely used in both western (Colchis) and eastern (Iberia) Georgia, appearing in Georgian architecture’s Dedabodzi (“mother-pillar”), a central sacred pillar comparable to a king post, as part of a Darbazi in the Kura–Araxes culture, where it served as a holy symbol. During the medieval period, this symbol was incorporated into Christian symbolism. It is depicted on well-known cathedrals such as Svetitskhoveli and Bagrati Cathedral. Nowadays, the symbol is used on Georgian IDs and passports, as well as on the national currency and by the Georgian Rugby Union. Georgian rugby team players are called ბორჯღალოსნები (borjgalosnebi), which means “men bearing the borjgali.” It was also used on the naval ensign of Georgia during the late 1990s and early 2000s.

== Gallery ==
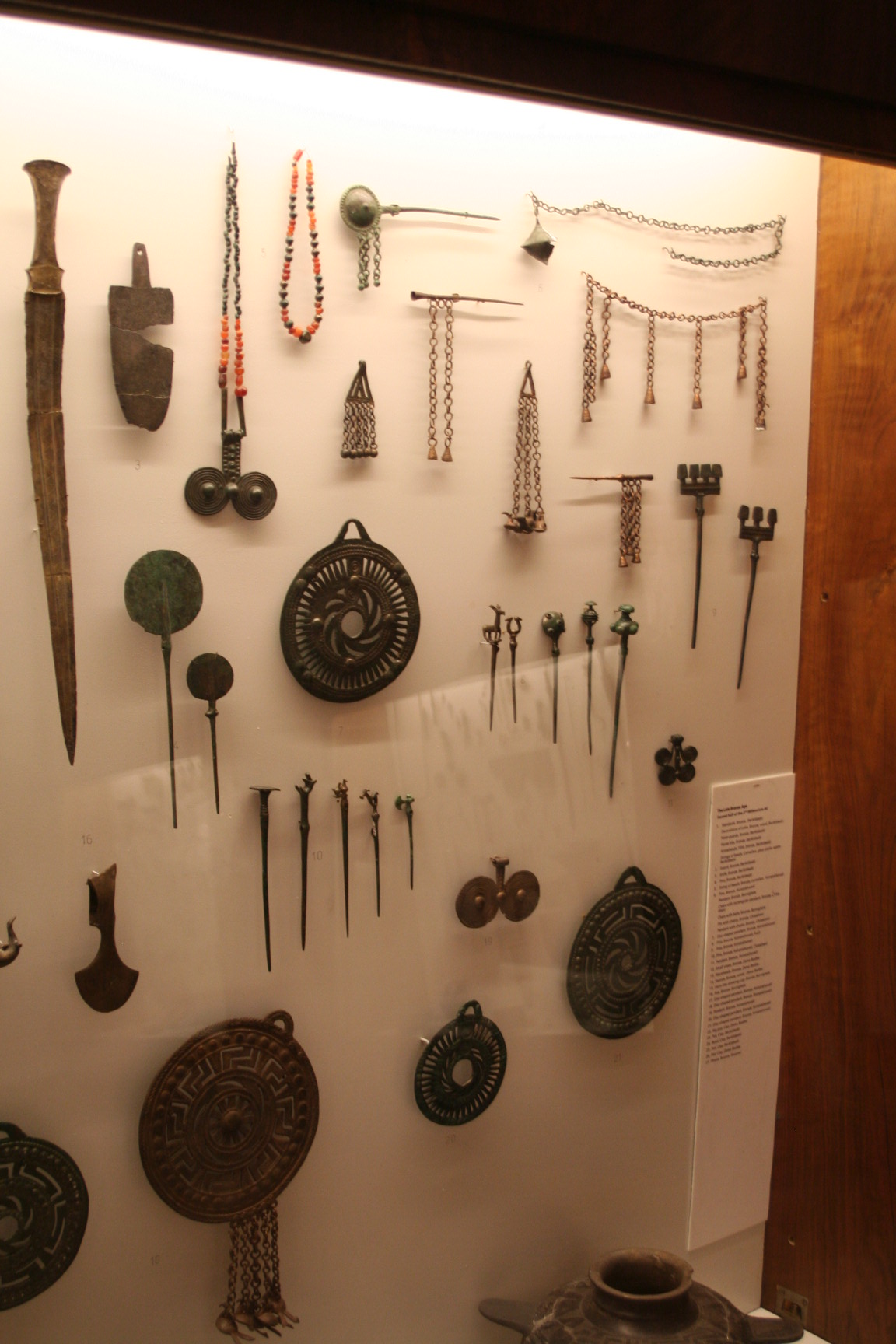
Colchian representation of the Borjgali

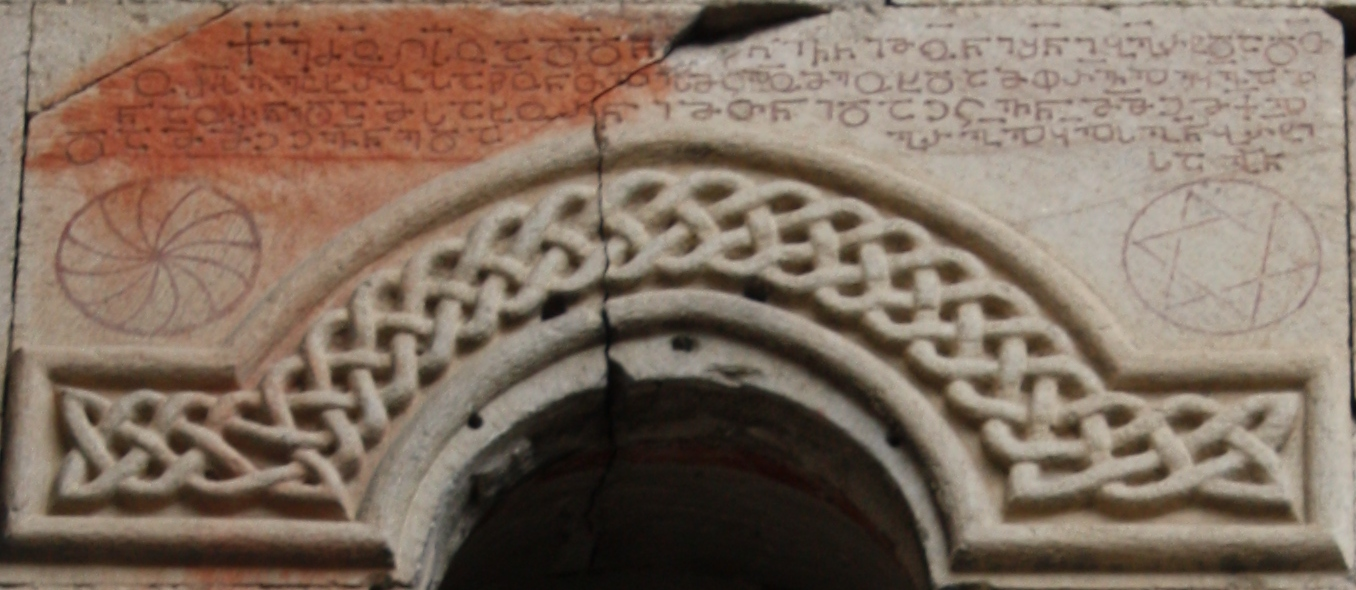
Borjgali on the Cathedral of Oshki

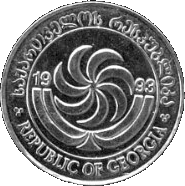
Borjgali on a Georgian coin

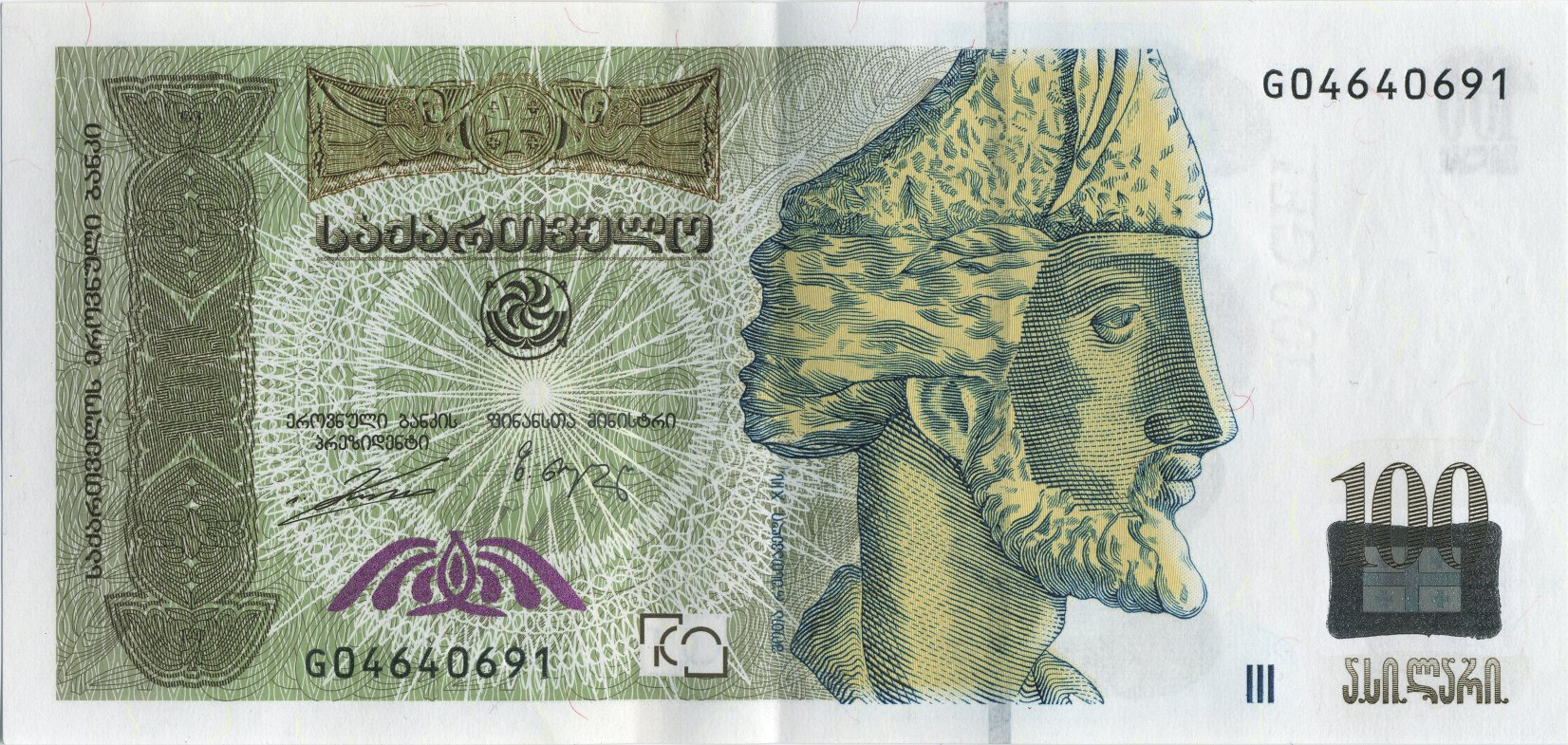
Borjgali on 100 Georgian lari

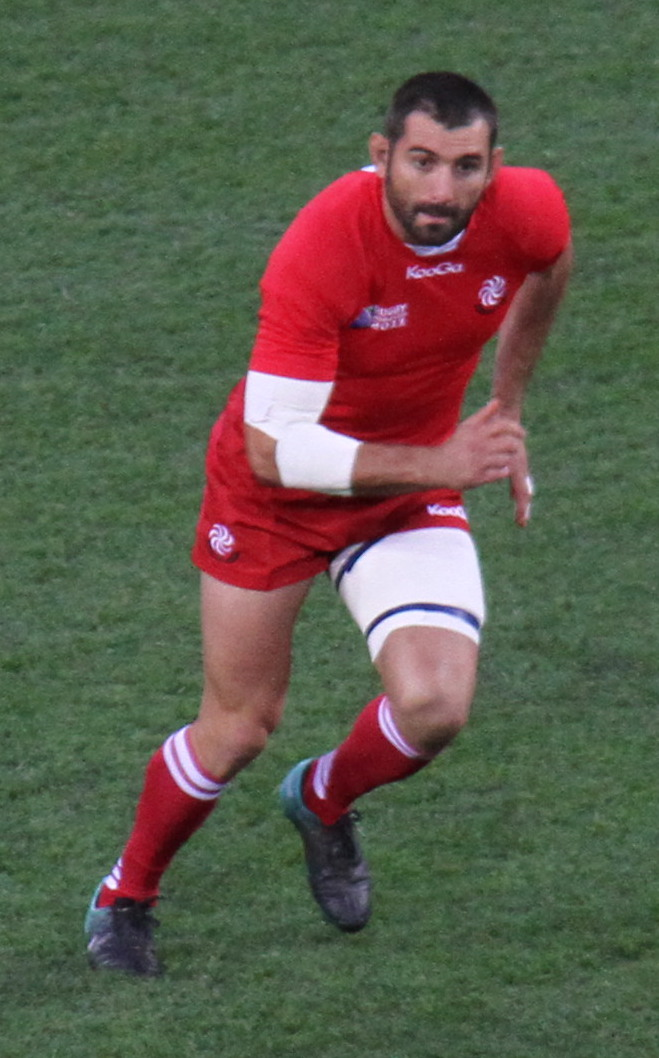
Georgian rugby player with Borjgali on his shorts and shirt

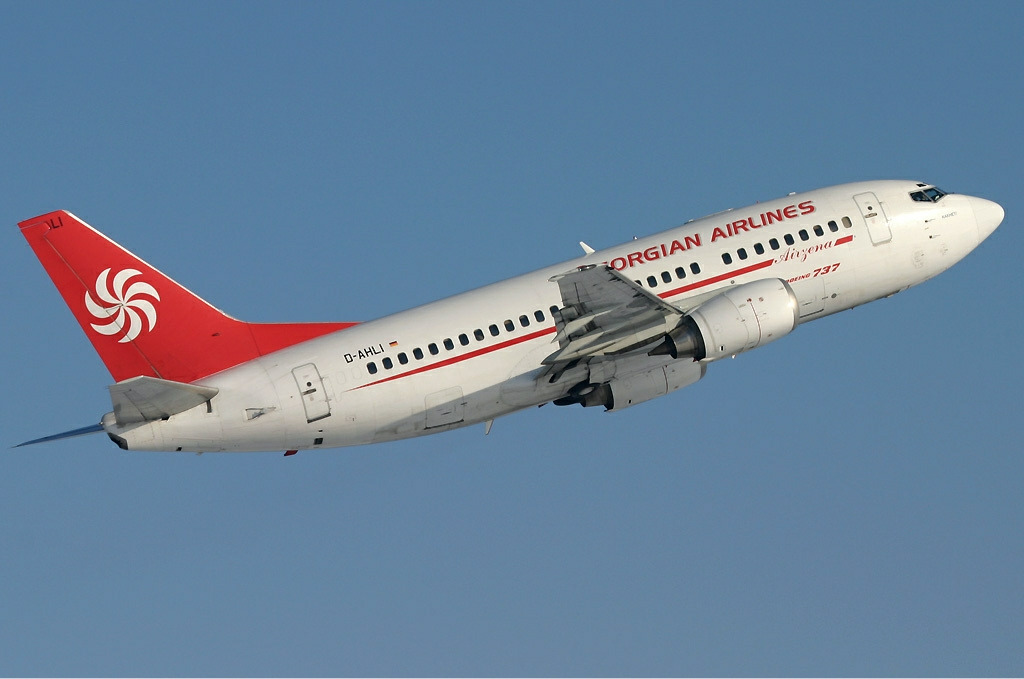
Borjgali on Georgian Airways

Borjgali in Fereydunshahr

== See also ==
- Arevakhach
- Hilarri
- Lauburu
- Triskelion
- Swastika
