= Dasht-e Azadegan =

Dasht-e Azadegan (Persian: دشت ازادگان) may refer to:

- Dasht-e Azadegan, Fars
- Dasht-e Azadegan, Isfahan
- Dasht-e Azadegan County, an administrative subdivision of Khuzestan Province, Iran
- Susangerd, capital of the previous

== See also ==
- Azadegan (disambiguation)
- Azadegan, Iran (disambiguation)
