= Aspas, Fars =

Village in Fars province, Iran

Aspas Persian: اسپاس
- Village
- Location within Iran
- Coordinates: 30°38′33″N 52°23′58″E
- Country: Iran
- Province: Fars
- County: Eqlid
- District: Sedeh
- Rural District: Aspas
- Elevation: 2,362 m (7,749 ft)

Population (2016)
  - Total: 2,016
- Time zone: UTC+3:30 (IRST)

Aspas (Persian: اسپاس) (Note: Also romanized as Āsopās and Āspās; also known as Āsupās) is a village in, and the capital of, Aspas Rural District of Sedeh District, Eqlid County, Fars province, Iran.

== Demographics ==
=== Population ===
At the time of the 2006 National Census, the village's population was 2,069 in 481 households. The following census in 2011 counted 2,006 people in 522 households. The 2016 census measured the population of the village as 2,016 people in 568 households. It was the most populous village in its rural district.

== Geography ==
Aspas is in the Zagros mountain range at an altitude of 2362 m. It lies in the foothills above the Balengan valley between the Palangi range and the Abedīn range. Aspas means Strong Guard in Persian, and the village may have been named in honor of Aspas (Aspasia), the daughter of Artaxerxes II of Persia, who was also the commander of his secret police.

== In literature ==
According to Thomas Herbert, who was in Safavid Iran in the first half of the 17th century, Aspas was inhabited by some 40,000 transplanted Christian Circassians and Georgians.
