= Dezhkord =

City in Fars province, Iran

Dezhkord Persian: دژکرد
- City
- Location within Iran
- Coordinates: 30°43′06″N 51°57′31″E
- Country: Iran
- Province: Fars
- County: Eqlid
- District: Sedeh

Population (2016)
  - Total: 3,924
- Time zone: UTC+3:30 (IRST)

Dezhkord (Persian: دژكرد) (Note: Formerly Eslamiyeh (اسلاميه), also romanized as Eslāmīyeh; also known as Dez Gerd, Dez Kard, Dez Kord, Dez-e-Kord, Dīzeh Kard, Dīzeh Khowrd, Dīz-i-Kurd, and Jadval-e Now) is a city in Sedeh District of Eqlid County, Fars province, Iran, serving as the administrative center for Dezhkord Rural District.

== Demographics ==
=== Population ===
In the 2006 National Census, the village of Eslamiyeh in Dezhkord Rural District had a population of 4,187 across 975 households. The following census in 2011 counted 4,220 people in 1,166 households, by which time the village had been elevated to the status of a city. The 2016 census measured the population of the city as 3,924 people in 1,198 households.

According to a 1939 study by the anthropologist Henry Field, around 500 Circassians were living in Dezhkord at that time. These families were descendants of Circassians resettled in Iran during the Safavid period. In the present day, while the group still acknowledges its origins, it has become fully absorbed into the surrounding population.
