= Hilarri =

Disk-shaped funerary stele

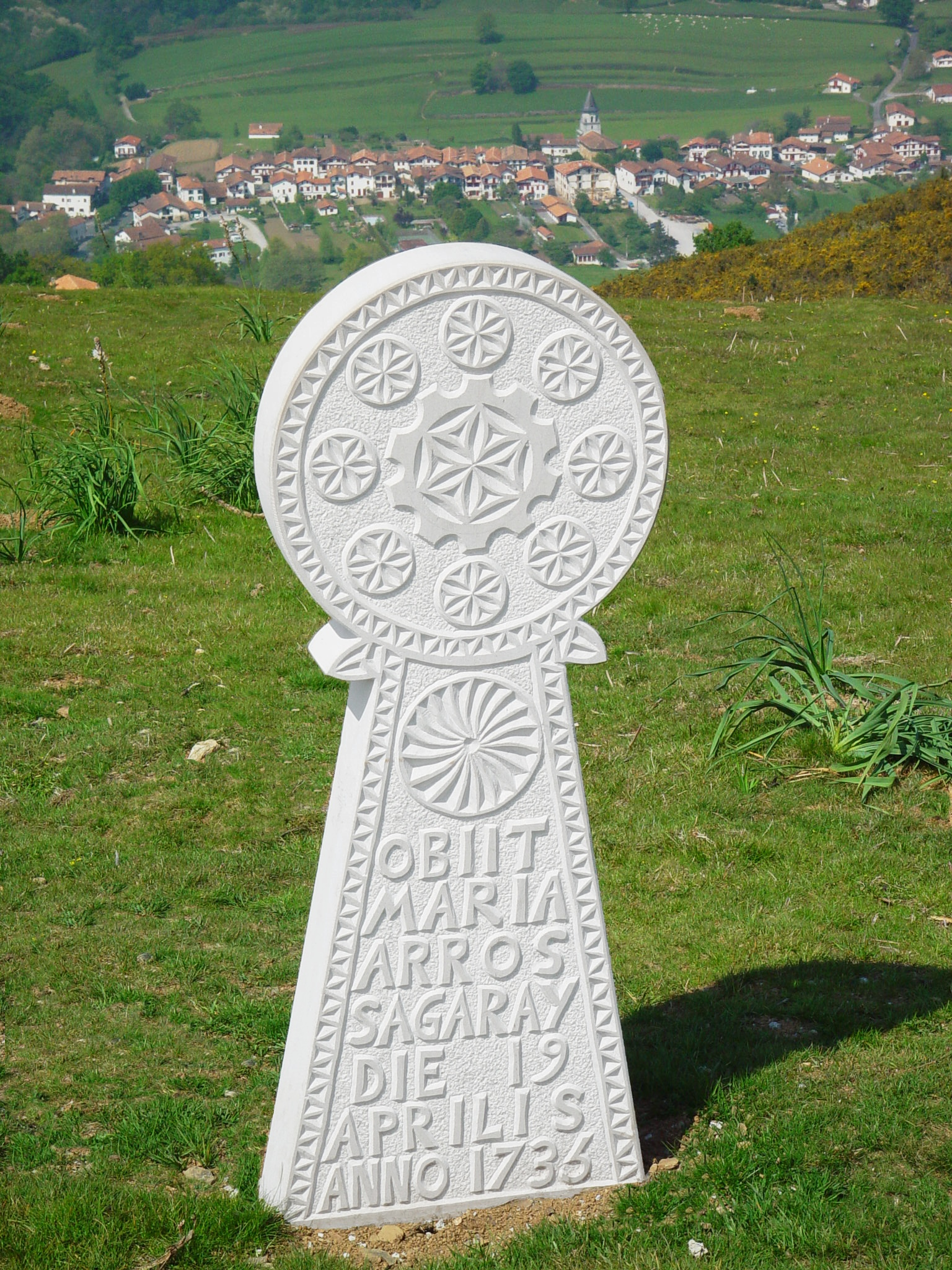
Hilarri facsimile in Ainhoa

Hilarri (from Basque hil 'dead' and harri 'stone') is the name given to disk-shaped funerary steles that are typical of the Basque Country.

These funerary steles present a disc-shaped head facing the rising sun on a trapezoidal stand. They belong to an old tradition throughout all of the Western Mediterranean, which includes parts of Europe and North Africa, but today they are mainly found in the Basque Country.

== Examples ==
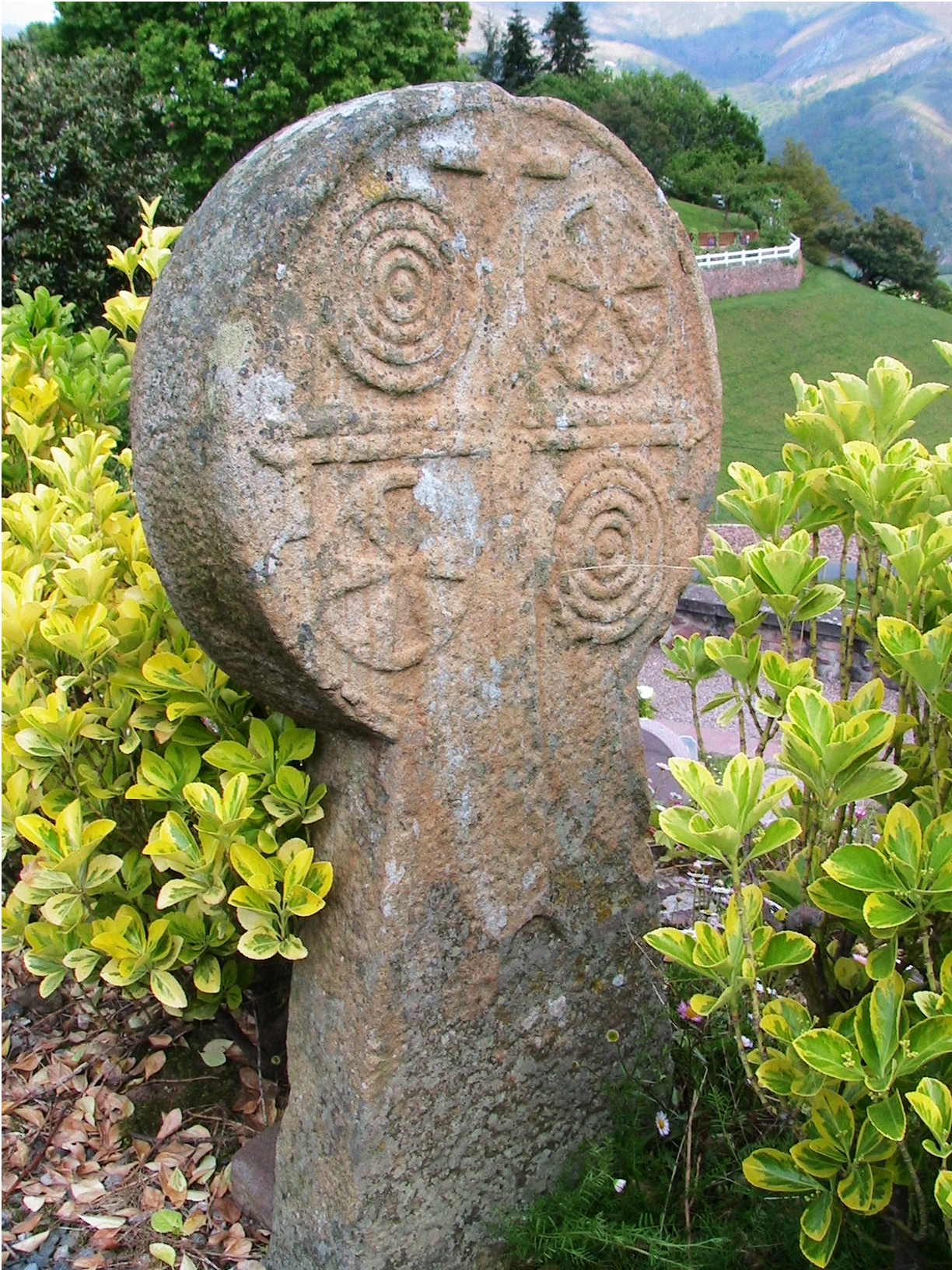
A cross and a rosette by sector.

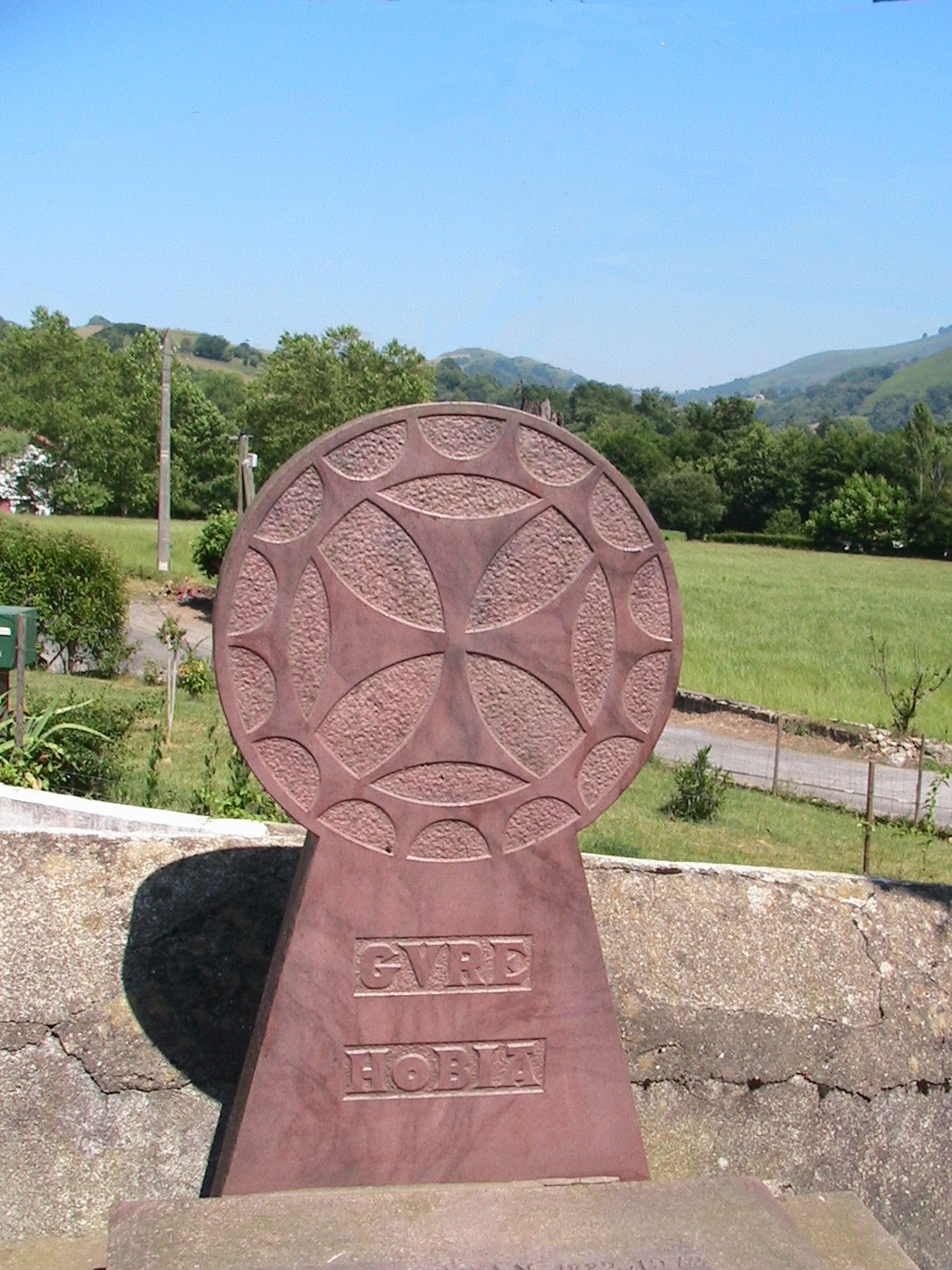
A cross pattée and text 'our grave'.

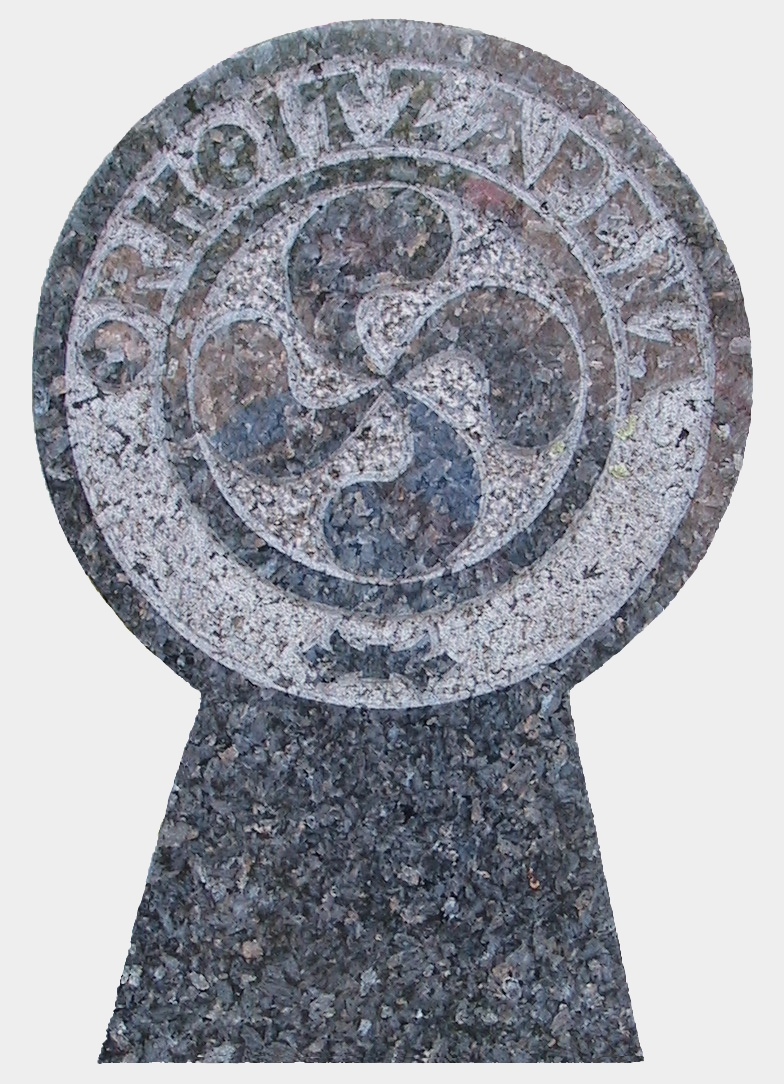
A lauburu and text 'Memory'.

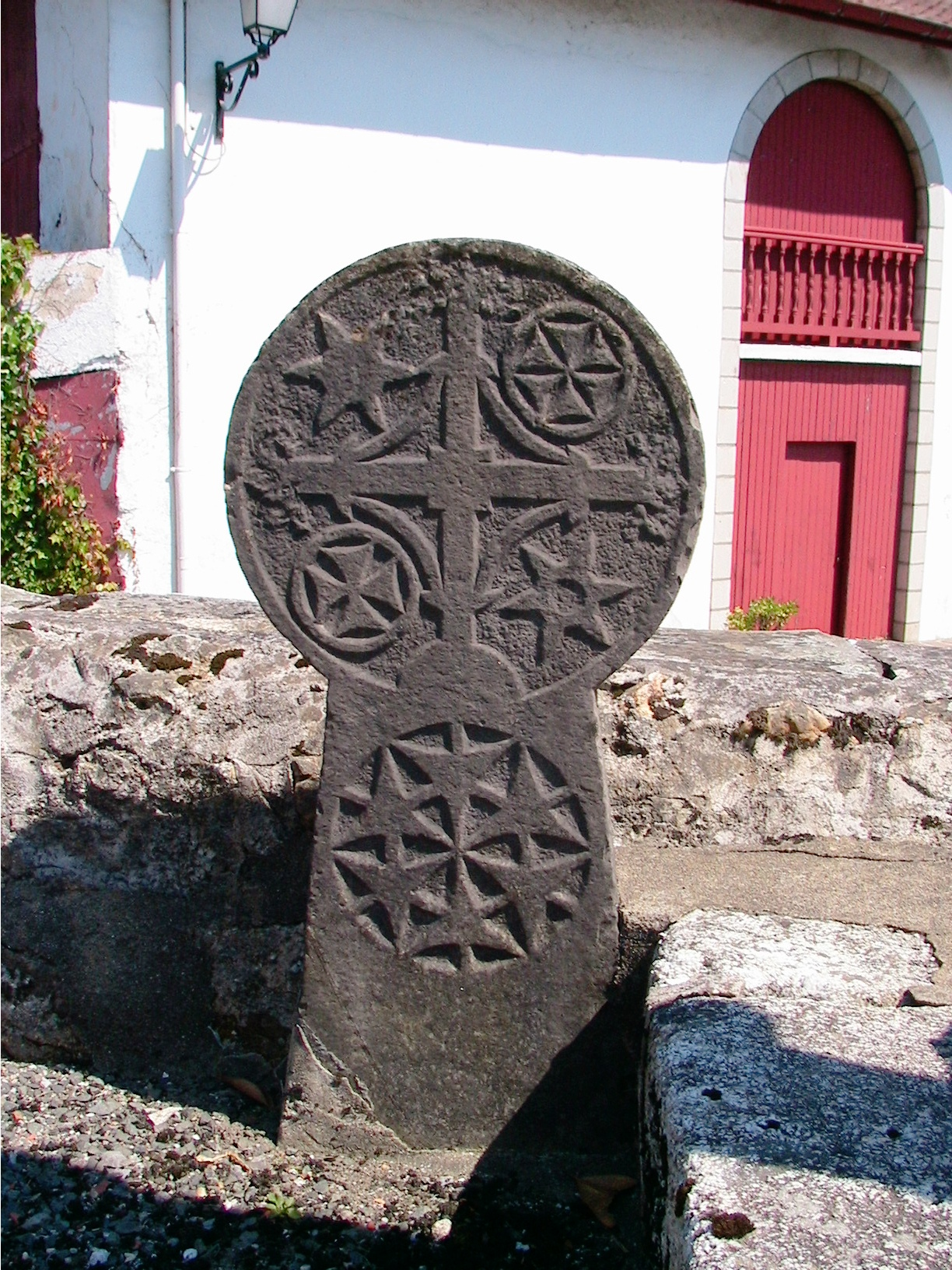
A cross and many kinds of stars.

== Ornamentation ==
=== Typology ===
The disc may be decorated by:

1. geometric symbols, generally organizing the disc into four or eight circle sectors (marked or implicit), a structuring of space that recalls the coat of arms of Navarre;
2. a single rosette;
3. a lauburu or other figures that indicate a rotation;
4. more specific figures.

A smaller rosette, a Christian cross or a text may be added on the stand.

==== Geometric symbols ====
Geometric symbols are regularly distributed on the disc within 4 or 8 circle sectors. The quarters are often delimited by a cross as:

- a flowered cross (flory), often reinforced by tangent arcs linking arms to each other;
- a kind of cross pattée with concave ends evoking the Maltese cross;
- an Occitan cross, similar to the former but with, for each arm, 2 concavities delimited by 3 tips.

They may be very simple or well worked. Sometimes, a diagonal secondary cross completes the figure.

Each sector is decorated with various small decorative symbols such as stars, moons, potent crosses or rosettes. They may be different in each sector. Sometimes, depictions of tools point out the trade of the deceased, whose name is seldom mentioned. Stylized hands open upwards may also be found.

==== Rosettes ====
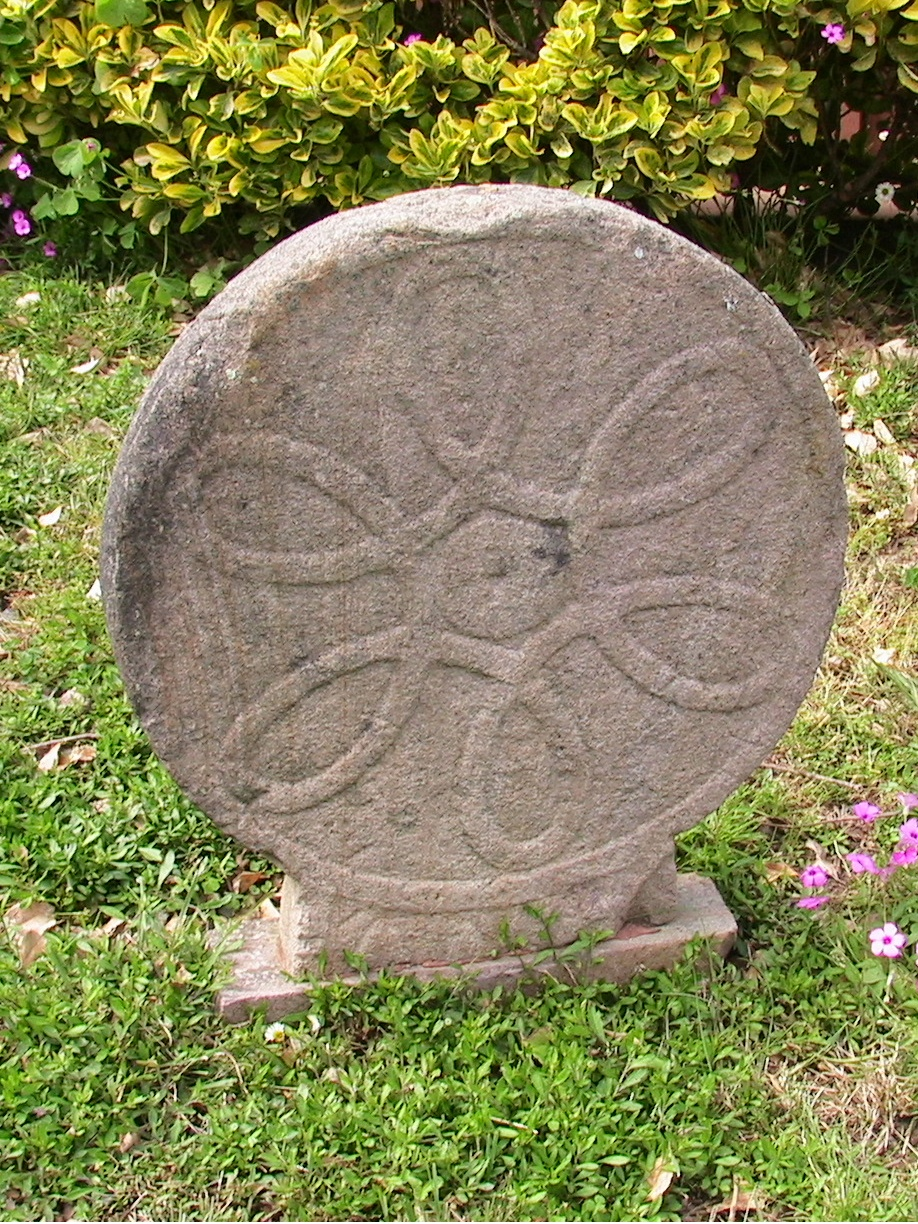
A figure with 6 loops.

Many steles are decorated by single rosettes. In this case the order of symmetry is often 6. The most frequent figures are:

- rosettes made up of 6 laurel leaves (with 2 in a horizontal plane);
- rosettes with 8 to 36 petals radiating from a central spot;
- stars as pentagram, hexagram or octogram (with 5, 6 or 8 points); sometimes an armed-cross is superimposed, arms being inserted between points;
- a square made up of 4 smaller squares;
- one circular string making up 4 or 6 loops around a central spot or circle, or 2 of them doing 8 loops; these rosettes seem static but in fact, loops have a sense of rotation that can be figured (the cord toward the right upside) or not.

==== Figures indicating a rotation ====
Some figures are designed to give an idea of rotation, generally clockwise, a sense which is often analyzed as positive. The most popular figures are :

- the lauburu;
- solar rosettes (of approximately 16 to 36 wings evoking a camera shutter).

One Navarrese hilarri presents a kind of lauburu made of four walking legs. This motive cannot be considered as usual in the Basque Country.

==== Other symbols ====
Some more specific figures can be encountered as:

- a figure that looks like a $ symbol, made up of 3 vertical lines, crossing 3 horizontal segments, linked to each other as a wide S; it could be a symbolic representation of weaving;
- Christograms (IHS + cross);
- some rare human representations can also be noticed; pentagrams could have been a stylization of human body.

They are all identified with Christ as the sun rising after Resurrection, evident also in Basque church symbols and the imagery of Loyola's Jesuit Order.

=== Surrounding ===
The surrounding of the disc is often decorated, giving an impression of a shining sun.

=== Modern hilarris ===
Many innovative ornamentations can be observed in modern hilarris. As an example, in Zuberoa, the traditional song "Orhiko txoria" (the bird of Orhy) has led to many representations of a bird flying towards this emblematic mountain. Others have seen connections to a prehistoric solar cult arriving with the Mauri or Jentillak and related to the Egyptian Horus, consort or manifestation of the Ishtar (the star) of Fertility among the desert and Sea People.

== See also ==
- Armenian eternity sign
- Atalburu
- Borjgali
- Celtic cross
- High cross
- Khachkar
