= Baseri Basnal =

Village in Uttarakhand, India

Coordinates: 29°44′34″N 79°14′51″E

- Village
- Location within Uttarakhand
- Country: India
- State: Uttarakhand
- District: Almora
- Tehsil: Bhikiyasain
- Time zone: UTC+5:30 (IST)

Baseri Basnal is a small village situated in Ramganga Valley of Kumaon division, a region in Uttarakhand, India. It is situated in the patti of Palla Naya, Syaldey block and tehsil Bhikiyasain. Politically it is part of Salt legislative assembly and Almora Lok Sabha constituency.

According to the census of 2011, it has a population of 363. More than 77% of the village was found literate. It is a completely Hindu village with Schedule Caste (SC) constituting 5.79% of total population. The current Gram Pradhan is Smt. Madhavi Devi Ghugtyal. One can reach Baseri via Road from Ramnagar, which is 80 km away. It is well connected to Delhi and NCR; however, the road has been accident prone in recent times. The nearest railway station is Ramnagar. The village has a popular temple named as Rudreshwar Mahadev Temple.
