= Azadegan Rural District =

Azadegan Rural District (Persian: دهستان آزادگان) may refer to:

- Azadegan Rural District (Kerman Province)
- Azadegan Rural District (Mazandaran Province)
