= Kharestan-e Bala =

Kharestan-e Bala خارستان بالا
- Village
- Location within Iran
- Coordinates: 28°41′36″N 60°56′11″E
- Country: Iran
- Province: Sistan and Baluchestan
- County: Mirjaveh
- Bakhsh: Central
- Rural District: Tamin

Population (2006)
  - Total: 241
- Time zone: UTC+3:30 (IRST)
  - Summer (DST): UTC+4:30 (IRDT)

Kharestan-e Bala (Persian: خارستان بالا, also Romanized as Khārestān-e Bālā) is a village in Tamin Rural District, in the Central District of Mirjaveh County, Sistan and Baluchestan Province, Iran. At the 2006 census, its population was 241, in 44 families.
