= Galleh Zan =

Galleh Zan گله زن
- Village
- Location within Iran
- Coordinates: 30°12′16″N 52°36′03″E
- Country: Iran
- Province: Fars
- County: Marvdasht
- Bakhsh: Dorudzan
- Rural District: Abarj

Population (2006)
  - Total: 483
- Time zone: UTC+3:30 (IRST)
  - Summer (DST): UTC+4:30 (IRDT)

Galleh Zan (Persian: گله زن; also known as Bāserī, Dorāh-e Galehzan, and Solūkolū) is a village in Abarj Rural District, Dorudzan District, Marvdasht County, Fars province, Iran. At the 2006 census, its population was 483, in 105 families.
