= Kharestan, Fars =

Kharestan خارستان
- Village
- Location within Iran
- Coordinates: 29°32′43″N 53°22′30″E
- Country: Iran
- Province: Fars
- County: Kharameh
- Bakhsh: Central
- Rural District: Sofla

Population (2006)
  - Total: 279
- Time zone: UTC+3:30 (IRST)
  - Summer (DST): UTC+4:30 (IRDT)

Kharestan (Persian: خارستان, also Romanized as Khārestān) is a village in Sofla Rural District, in the Central District of Kharameh County, Fars province, Iran. At the 2006 census, its population was 279, in 69 families.
