= Azadegan-e Yek =

Azadegan-e Yek ازادگان 1
- Village
- Country: Iran
- Province: Kerman
- County: Sirjan
- Bakhsh: Central
- Rural District: Najafabad

Population (2006)
  - Total: 34
- Time zone: UTC+3:30 (IRST)
  - Summer (DST): UTC+4:30 (IRDT)

Azadegan-e Yek (Persian: ازادگان 1, also Romanized as Āzādegān-e Yek) is a village in Najafabad Rural District, in the Central District of Sirjan County, Kerman Province, Iran. At the 2006 census, its population was 34, in 11 families.
