= Baseri, Nepal =

BASERI बसेरी 1400 Baseri
- Village development committee
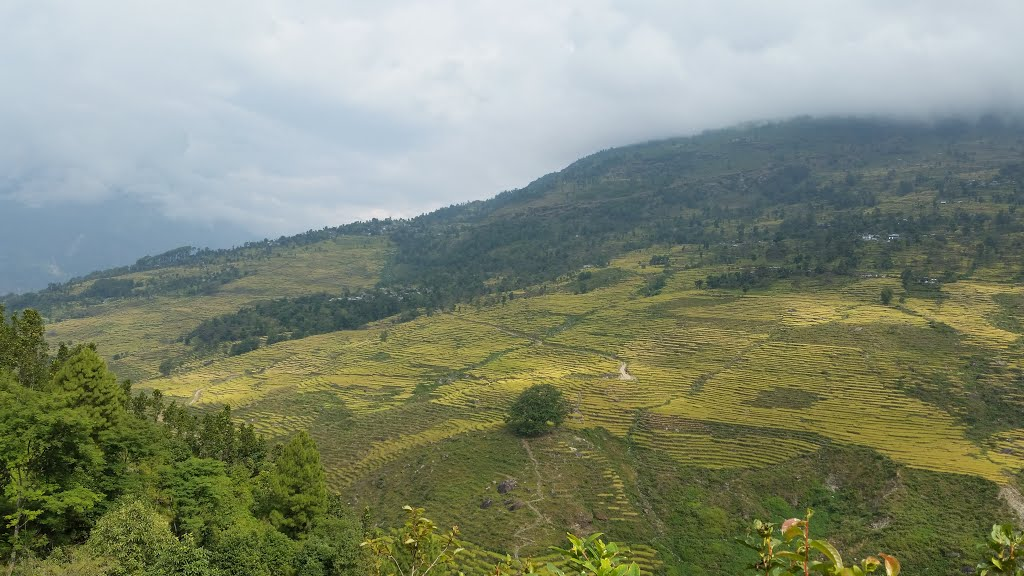

- Location in Nepal
- Coordinates: 28.10°N 84.87°E
- Country: Nepal
- Zone: Bagmati Zone
- District: Dhading District

Population (1991)
  - Total: 6,264
  - Religions: Hindu
- Time zone: UTC+5:45 (Nepal Time)
- Website: Facebook Page: Baseri Dhading

Baseri is a village in Dhading District in the Bagmati Zone of central Nepal. At the time of the 1991 Nepal census it had a population of 6264 and had 1196 houses in it. It is 60 kilometers away from the district headquarter Dhadingbesi. The main occupation of the people here is agriculture. The people of the village are Brahmin and Chhetri in the lower part and Ghale and Gurung in the upper part. In Baseri VDC there is 3 Secondary Schools and they are Shree Mahalaxmi Higher Secondary School, Shree Baseri Secondary School and Shree Shivalaya Secondary School. Shree Mahalaxmi School is located at central of Baseri VDC. Destinations of Baseri : Tinsure Gumba, Nange Chour, Shivalaya Mandir, Annapurna Temple, Ramche Dhunga and Kaliruwa.

== 2015 earthquake ==
Being close to the epicenter and lodged on a steep hillside, the village was extremely hard hit by the April 2015 Nepal earthquake.
