= Rustai-ye Azadegan =

Rustai-ye Azadegan روستاي آزادگان
- Village
- Interactive map of Rustai-ye Azadegan
- Country: Iran
- Province: Kerman
- County: Jiroft
- Bakhsh: Central
- Rural District: Dowlatabad

Population (2006)
  - Total: 768
- Time zone: UTC+3:30 (IRST)
  - Summer (DST): UTC+4:30 (IRDT)

Rustai-ye Azadegan (Persian: روستاي آزادگان, also Romanized as Rūstāī-ye Āzādegān) is a village in Dowlatabad Rural District, in the Central District of Jiroft County, Kerman Province, Iran. At the 2006 census, its population was 768, in 164 families.
