= Qatar Aghaj, Hamadan =

Qatar Aghaj قطاراغاج
- Village
- Location within Iran
- Coordinates: 35°34′09″N 48°28′16″E
- Country: Iran
- Province: Hamadan
- County: Kabudarahang
- Bakhsh: Shirin Su
- Rural District: Shirin Su

Population (2006)
  - Total: 223
- Time zone: UTC+3:30 (IRST)
  - Summer (DST): UTC+4:30 (IRDT)

Qatar Aghaj (Persian: قطاراغاج, also Romanized as Qaţār Āghāj; also known as Ghatar Aghaj, Qaţār Āqāj, and Qatrākhāj) is a village in Shirin Su Rural District, Shirin Su District, Kabudarahang County, Hamadan Province, Iran. At the 2006 census, the village had a population of 223 people, in 48 families.
