= Sedeh, Fasa =

Sedeh سده
- Village
- Location within Iran
- Coordinates: 28°42′56″N 53°53′42″E
- Country: Iran
- Province: Fars
- County: Fasa
- Bakhsh: Shibkaveh
- Rural District: Miyan Deh

Population (2006)
  - Total: 166
- Time zone: UTC+3:30 (IRST)
  - Summer (DST): UTC+4:30 (IRDT)

Sedeh (Persian: سده; also known as Seh Deh) is a village in Miyan Deh Rural District, Shibkaveh, Fasa County, Fars province, Iran. At the 2006 census, its population was 166, in 38 families.
