= Sedeh =

City in Fars province, Iran

Sedeh Persian: سده
- City
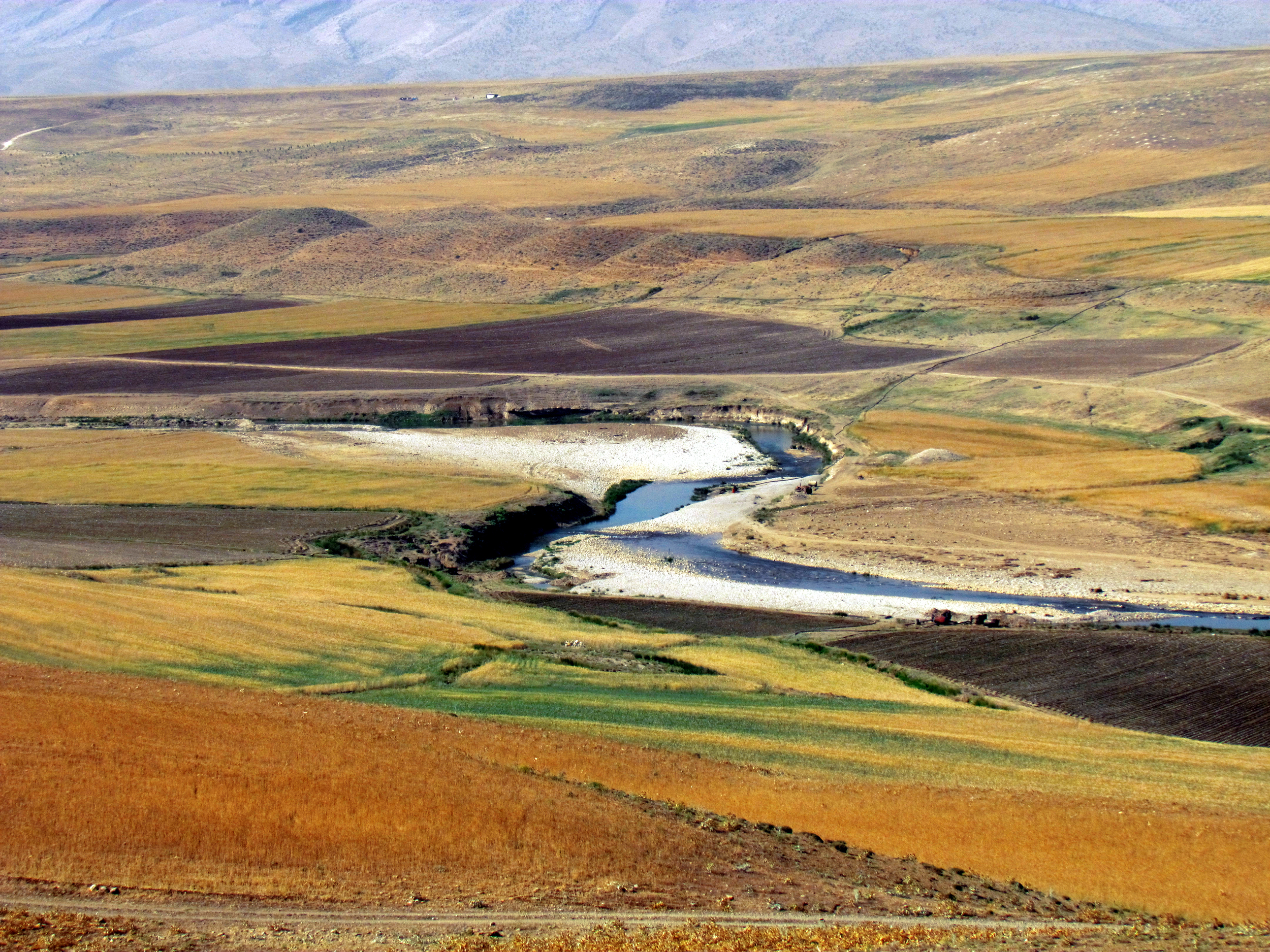

- Location within Iran
- Coordinates: 30°42′33″N 52°10′30″E
- Country: Iran
- Province: Fars
- County: Eqlid
- District: Sedeh

Population (2016)
  - Total: 6,747
- Time zone: UTC+3:30 (IRST)

Sedeh (Persian: سده) (Note: Also known as Sehdeh) is a city in, and the capital of, Sedeh District of Eqlid County, Fars province, Iran. It also serves as the administrative center for Sedeh Rural District.

== Demographics ==
=== Population ===
At the time of the 2006 National Census, the city's population was 5,572 in 1,321 households. The following census in 2011 counted 6,137 people in 1,629 households. The 2016 census measured the population of the city as 6,747 people in 1,923 households.

== Geography ==
Sedeh is about 125 kilometres (78 mi) north-to-northwest of Shiraz. The city is on the historical route taken by Alexander the Great in 331 BC between the Persian Gates and Persepolis.
