= Hoseynabad-e Baseri =

Hoseynabad-e Baseri حسين اباد باصری
- Village
- Location within Iran
- Coordinates: 30°04′11″N 52°46′13″E
- Country: Iran
- Province: Fars
- County: Marvdasht
- Bakhsh: Central
- Rural District: Rudbal

Population (2006)
  - Total: 208
- Time zone: UTC+3:30 (IRST)
  - Summer (DST): UTC+4:30 (IRDT)

Hoseynabad-e Baseri (Persian: حسين اباد باصری, also known as Hosseinabad-e Sar Tavileh and Ḩoseynābād) is a village in Rudbal Rural District, in the Central District of Marvdasht County, Fars province, Iran. At the 2006 census, its population was 208, in 55 families.
