= Izadkhast-e Baseri =

Izadkhast-e Baseri ايزدخواست باصري
- Village
- Location within Iran
- Coordinates: 29°31′42″N 53°01′38″E
- Country: Iran
- Province: Fars
- County: Shiraz
- Bakhsh: Central
- Rural District: Darian

Population (2006)
  - Total: 1,642
- Time zone: UTC+3:30 (IRST)
  - Summer (DST): UTC+4:30 (IRDT)

Izadkhaast-e Baseri (Persian: ايزدخواست باصري, also Romanized as Īzadkhāst-e Bāşerī; also known as Īzadkhāst) is a village in Darian Rural District, in the Central District of Shiraz County, Fars province, Iran. At the 2006 census, its population was 1,642, in 389 families.
