= Kharestan-e Olya, Khuzestan =

Kharestan-e Olya خارستان عليا
- Village
- Location within Iran
- Coordinates: 30°39′36″N 50°13′38″E
- Country: Iran
- Province: Khuzestan
- County: Behbahan
- Bakhsh: Central
- Rural District: Howmeh

Population (2006)
  - Total: 90
- Time zone: UTC+3:30 (IRST)
  - Summer (DST): UTC+4:30 (IRDT)

Kharestan-e Olya (Persian: خارستان عليا, also Romanized as Khārestān-e ‘Olyā; also known as Khār sūn ‘Olyā) is a village in Howmeh Rural District, in the Central District of Behbahan County, Khuzestan Province, Iran. At the 2006 census, its population was 90, in 22 families.
