= Sedeh Rural District (Eqlid County) =

Rural district in Fars province, Iran

Sedeh Rural District Persian: دهستان سده
- Rural District
- Location within Iran
- Coordinates: 30°40′16″N 52°11′37″E
- Country: Iran
- Province: Fars
- County: Eqlid
- District: Sedeh
- Capital: Sedeh

Population (2016)
  - Total: 437
- Time zone: UTC+3:30 (IRST)

Sedeh Rural District (Persian: دهستان سده) is in the Sedeh District of Eqlid County, Fars province, Iran. It is administered from the city of Sedeh.

== Demographics ==
=== Population ===
At the time of the 2006 National Census, the rural district's population was 381 in 80 households. There were 467 inhabitants in 128 households at the following census of 2011. The 2016 census measured the population of the rural district as 437 in 128 households. The most populous of its 21 villages was Hajjiabad, with 419 people.
