= Kharestan-e Sofla, Khuzestan =

Kharestan-e Sofla خارستان سفلی
- Village
- Location within Iran
- Coordinates: 30°39′11″N 50°12′49″E
- Country: Iran
- Province: Khuzestan
- County: Behbahan
- Bakhsh: Central
- Rural District: Howmeh

Population (2006)
  - Total: 146
- Time zone: UTC+3:30 (IRST)
  - Summer (DST): UTC+4:30 (IRDT)

Kharestan-e Sofla (Persian: خارستان سفلی, also Romanized as Khārestān-e Soflá; also known as Khār sūn Soflá) is a village in Howmeh Rural District, in the Central District of Behbahan County, Khuzestan Province, Iran. At the 2006 census, its population was 146, in 35 families.
