= Aspas Rural District =

Rural district in Fars province, Iran

Aspas Rural District Persian: دهستان آسپاس
- Rural District
- Location within Iran
- Coordinates: 30°37′59″N 52°20′46″E
- Country: Iran
- Province: Fars
- County: Eqlid
- District: Sedeh
- Capital: Aspas

Population (2016)
  - Total: 3,946
- Time zone: UTC+3:30 (IRST)

Aspas Rural District (Persian: دهستان آسپاس) is in Sedeh District of Eqlid County, Fars province, Iran. Its capital is the village of Aspas.

== Demographics ==
=== Population ===
At the time of the 2006 National Census, the rural district's population was 4,116 in 922 households. There were 3,933 inhabitants in 989 households at the following census of 2011. The 2016 census measured the population of the rural district as 3,946 in 1,106 households. The most populous of its 25 villages was Aspas, with 2,016 people.
