= Dezhkord Rural District =

Rural district in Fars province, Iran

Dezhkord Rural District Persian: دهستان دژكرد
- Rural District
- Location within Iran
- Coordinates: 30°40′34″N 51°55′53″E
- Country: Iran
- Province: Fars
- County: Eqlid
- District: Sedeh
- Capital: Dezhkord

Population (2016)
  - Total: 3,236
- Time zone: UTC+3:30 (IRST)

Dezhkord Rural District (Persian: دهستان دژكرد) is in Sedeh District of Eqlid County, Fars province, Iran. It is administered from the city of Dezhkord.

== Demographics ==
=== Population ===
At the time of the 2006 National Census, the rural district's population was 7,438 in 1,703 households. There were 3,380 inhabitants in 891 households at the following census of 2011. The 2016 census measured the population of the rural district as 3,236 in 962 households. The most populous of its 23 villages was Tang-e Boraq, with 537 people.
