= Sedeh District (Eqlid County) =

District in Fars province, Iran

Sedeh District Persian: بخش سده
- District
- Location within Iran
- Coordinates: 30°40′18″N 52°08′37″E
- Country: Iran
- Province: Fars
- County: Eqlid
- Capital: Sedeh

Population (2016)
  - Total: 18,290
- Time zone: UTC+3:30 (IRST)

Sedeh District (Persian: بخش سده) is in Eqlid County, Fars province, Iran. Its capital is the city of Sedeh.

== Demographics ==
=== Population ===
At the time of the 2006 National Census, the district's population was 17,507 in 4,026 households. The following census in 2011 counted 18,137 people in 4,803 households, by which time the village of Eslamiyeh had been elevated to the status of the city of Dezhkord. The 2016 census measured the population of the district as 18,290 inhabitants in 5,317 households.

=== Administrative divisions ===
Sedeh District Population
Administrative Divisions	2006	2011	2016
Aspas RD	4,116	3,933	3,946
Dezhkord RD	7,438	3,380	3,236
Sedeh RD	381	467	437
Dezhkord (city) (Note: Formerly the village of Eslamiyeh)		4,220	3,924
Sedeh (city)	5,572	6,137	6,747
Total	17,507	18,137	18,290
RD = Rural District
