= Daniel Micka =

Czech writer and translator

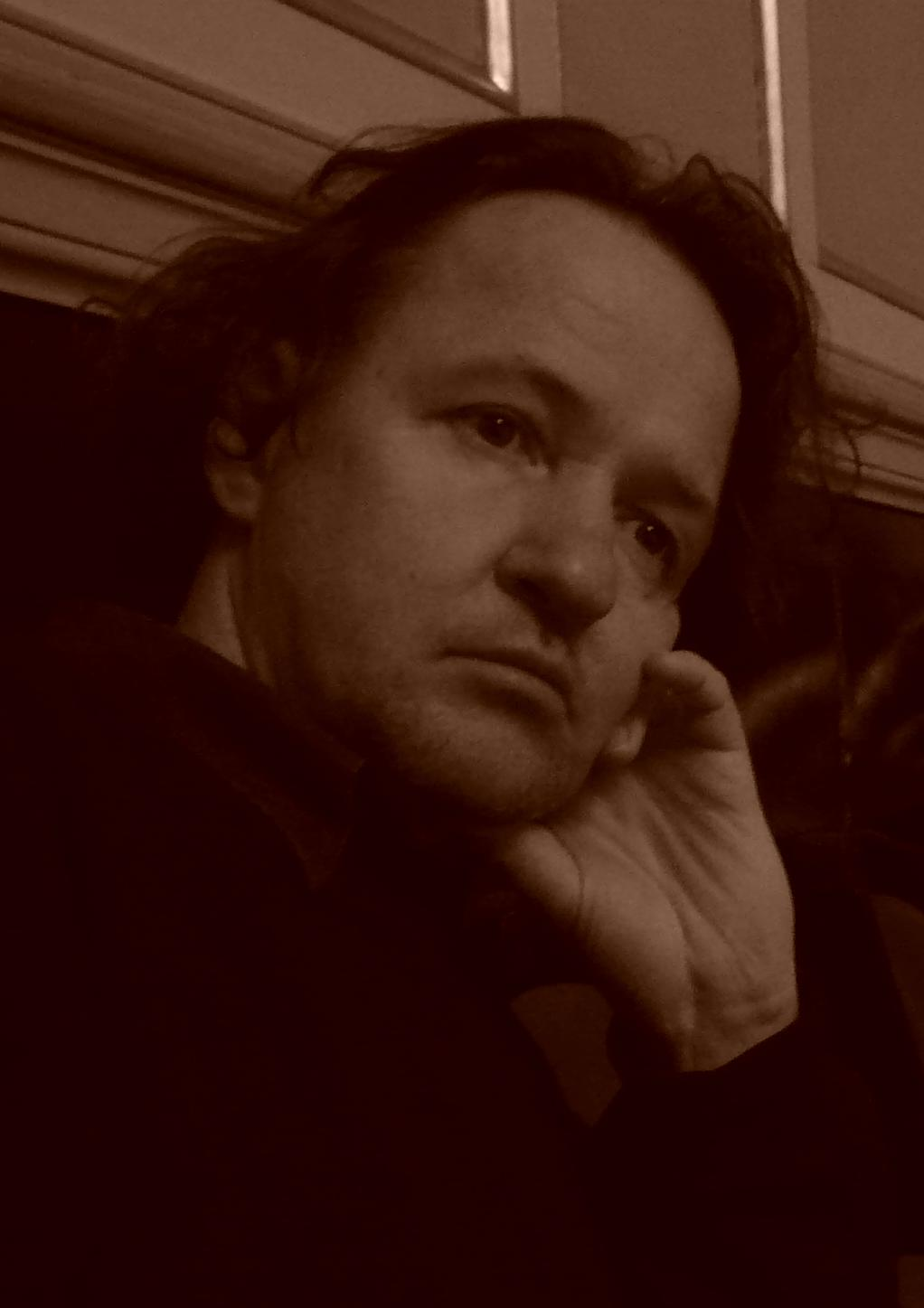
- Daniel Micka, 2007
- Born: 22 April 1963 (age 63); Prague, Czechoslovakia
- Citizenship: Czech Republic
- Occupations: short story writer, translator
- Writing career
- Language: Czech
- Period: 1992–present

Daniel Micka (born 22 April 1963 in Prague) is a Czech writer and translator from English and French into Czech.

His stories have been published since 1992 in a range of Czech literary periodicals, later he has published three collections of his stories in a book form. The first book Overwhelmed by Love for Someone was published in 1996, and its sequel Fear of People in 2001. His next related collection Looking for Someone and Dreaming About Making Love to Them was released first in 2007 as an e-book and in a book form in 2011. His stories became the inspiration for two plays and some have been published in translation into Finnish, Dutch and Polish in foreign literary anthologies and magazines.

He translates books about philosophy, psychology and religion from various English-language authors, including Stuart Wilde, Norman Vincent Peale, Henryk Skolimowski, John N. Gray, Daniel A. Helminiak, Jeffrey Moussaieff Masson, Ian Buruma, David Benatar, Yosef Hayim Yerushalmi, Dambisa Moyo, Christopher Lasch, Harriet A. Washington, David Bakan, Dan Allender, Ronald Dworkin and others. The subject of several books he translated are views of Sigmund Freud and Otto Weininger. He has translated two books by Boris Cyrulnik from French into Czech. He has also translated films, documentaries and screenplays for Czechoslovak Television and the company Alfafilm.

Daniel Micka, in addition to writing prose now dedicates himself to translating from English and French into Czech for various publishers. He also works as a book editor. He lives and works in Prague in the Czech Republic.

== Works ==
=== Magazine articles ===
Individual Micka's stories have been published since 1992 in Tvar, Literární noviny, Vokno, Iniciály, Revolver Revue etc. literary magazines.

The supplement of Tvar – TVARy – also published a small collection of stories:

- Strach z lidí. [Fear of People.] Series TVARy, vol. 2. 1995. – "Strach z lidí". Tvar. 6 (2): 1–32 (suppl.). 26 January 1995.
- Hledání člověka. [Looking for Someone.] Series TVARy, vol. 19. 2004. – "Hledání člověka". Tvar. 15 (19): 1–32 (suppl.). 18 November 2004. ISSN 0862-657X.

=== Published books ===
- Samou láskou člověka sníst. [Overwhelmed by Love for Someone.] Brno: Petrov. 1996. ISBN 80-85247-72-0.

– A collection of twenty three short stories expressing the feelings of a lonely man who finds the courage to approach people but looks for his place in life in vain; the main theme of these stories is finally death and the indifference to others and their indifference to the individual.

- Strach z lidí. [Fear of People.] Brno: Petrov. 2001. ISBN 80-7227-097-4.

– A collection of forty two stories on various themes linked by the feeling of the rootlessness and groping of a man – his embarrassment over his life and interpersonal relations, his fear of other people; the book is in stark contrast to the first but is in fact a continuation.

- Hledání člověka a sny o milování se s ním. [Looking for Someone and Dreaming About Making Love to Them.] Praha : dybbuk. 2011. ISBN 978-80-7438-042-6.
  - E-book: Hledání člověka a sny o milování se s ním [E-kniha]. Praha : dybbuk, 2011. 144 pages (PDF). EAN EK167551. – revised edition
  - The book was originally published as an e-book: Hledání člověka a sny o milování se s ním. Praha (e-book): dybbuk. 2007. (Beletrie; vol. 05.)

– The next collection of short stories is based on extraordinary experiences of the narrator, who appears in them in a range of unusual forms but in an unchangeable role; the literary and existential testimony of an individual looking for someone and dreaming about making love to them.

=== Published in anthologies ===
- "Exkurse" (in Czech). in Kopáč, Radim; Jirkalová, Karolína; et al. (eds.) (2004). Antologie nové české literatury 1995–2004. [Anthology of New Czech Literature 1995–2004.] Praha: Fra. pp. 209–213. ISBN 80-86603-22-9.

=== Translated into foreign languages ===
- —— (September 1994). "Illusorinen murha". Parnasso (in Finnish). 44 (3). Translated by Eero Balk. Helsinki: 322. ISSN 0031-2320.
- —— (2004). "Ystäväkauppa". Bohemia (in Finnish) (1). Translated by Eero Balk. Helsinki. ISSN 1456-9493.
- —— (December 2007). "Verhalen : Adoptie; Ontsnapping; Zoenen van een egel in een kooi". Tijdschrift voor Slavische Literatuur (in Dutch) (48). Translated by Herbert van Lynden. Amsterdam: 36–47. ISSN 0922-1182. Available online – three stories from the book Strach z lidí [Fear of People] (2001).
- —— (December 2012). "Verhalen : Mijn terechtstelling; Kooi met bavianen; Kastanjes". Tijdschrift voor Slavische Literatuur (in Dutch) (63). Translated by Herbert van Lynden. Amsterdam: 71–75. ISSN 0922-1182. Available online – three stories from the book Samou láskou člověka sníst [Overwhelmed by Love for Someone] (1996).
- —— (2005). Translated by Barbara Kudaj. "W poszukiwaniu człowieka". Czeskie Revue (Racibórz-Ostróg) [online] (in Polish). Available online (archived link) – three stories from the collection Hledání člověka [Looking for Someone] (2004).

== Translations from English into Czech ==
- Wilde, Stuart (1994). Kormidluj svůj člun. [Affirmations.] Praha: Erika, Petra. ISBN 80-85612-78-X.
- Peale, Norman Vincent (1996). Síla pozitivního žití. [The Power of Positive Living.] Praha: Pragma, Knižní klub. ISBN 80-7176-450-7, ISBN 80-7205-059-1.
- Baker, Stephen (1997). Jak žít s neurotickou kočkou. [How to Live with a Neurotic Cat.] Praha: Pragma. ISBN 80-7205-385-X.
- Skolimowski, Henryk (2001). Účastná mysl : nová teorie poznání a vesmíru. [The Participatory Mind : A New Theory of Knowledge and of the Universe.] Praha: Mladá fronta. ISBN 80-204-0918-1.
- Gray, John (2004). Dvě tváře liberalismu. [Two Faces of Liberalism.] Praha: Mladá fronta. ISBN 80-204-0992-0.
- Helminiak, Daniel A. (2004). Ježíš Kristus : kým byl/je doopravdy. [The Same Jesus : A Contemporary Christology.] Praha: Práh. ISBN 80-7252-105-5.
- Jampolsky, Gerald G. (2004). Léčivá moc lásky : sedm principů atitudálního léčení. [Teach Only Love : The Seven Principles of Attitudinal Healing.] Praha: Pragma. ISBN 80-7205-145-8.
- White, Gregory L.; Mullen, Paul E. (2006). Žárlivost : teorie, výzkum a klinické strategie. [Jealousy : Theory, Research, and Clinical Strategies.] Praha: Triton. ISBN 80-7254-708-9.
- Helminiak, Daniel A. (2007). Co vlastně Bible říká o homosexualitě? [What the Bible Really Says About Homosexuality.] Brno: Centrum pro studium demokracie a kultury (CDK). ISBN 978-80-7325-122-2.
- Masson, Jeffrey Moussaieff (2007). Útok na pravdu : Freudovo potlačení teorie svádění. [The Assault on Truth : Freud's Suppression of the Seduction Theory.] Praha: Mladá fronta. ISBN 978-80-204-1640-7.
- Slipp, Samuel (2007). Freudovská mystika : Freud, ženy a feminismus. [The Freudian Mystique : Freud, Women, and Feminism.] Praha: Triton. ISBN 978-80-7254-891-0.
- Wolff, Larry (2007). Týrání a zneužívání dětí ve Vídni v době Freuda (korespondenční lístky z konce světa). [Child Abuse in Freud's Vienna : Postcards from the End of the World.] Praha: Triton. ISBN 978-80-7254-869-9.
- Dreger, Alice Domurat (2009). Hermafroditi a medicínská konstrukce pohlaví. [Hermaphrodites and the Medical Invention of Sex.] Praha: Triton. ISBN 978-80-7387-040-9.
- Sengoopta, Chandak (2009). Otto Weininger : sexualita a věda v císařské Vídni. [Otto Weininger : Sex, Science, and Self in Imperial Vienna.] Praha: Academia. ISBN 978-80-200-1753-6.
- Kushner, Howard I. (2011). Tourettův syndrom. [A Cursing Brain? : The Histories of Tourette syndrome.] Praha: Triton. ISBN 978-80-7387-471-1.
- Buruma, Ian (2012). Krocení bohů : Náboženství a demokracie na třech kontinentech. [Taming the Gods : Religion and Democracy on Three Continents.] Praha: Academia. ISBN 978-80-200-2040-6.
- Benatar, David (2013). Nebýt či být : O utrpení, které přináší příchod na tento svět. [Better Never to Have Been : The Harm of Coming into Existence.] Praha: Dybbuk. ISBN 978-80-7438-085-3.
- Yerushalmi, Yosef Hayim (2015). Freudův Mojžíš : Judaismus konečný a nekonečný. [Freud's Moses : Judaism Terminable and Interminable.] Praha: Academia. ISBN 978-80-200-2501-2.
- Smith, Jeffrey M. (2015). Doba jedová 5 : Geneticky modifikované potraviny. [Genetic Roulette : The Documented Health Risks of Genetically Engineered Foods.] Praha: Stanislav Juhaňák–Triton. ISBN 978-80-7387-924-2.
- Moyo, Dambisa (2015). Kterak Západ zbloudil : 50 let ekonomického bláznovství – a neúprosná rozhodnutí, která nás čekají. [How the West Was Lost : Fifty Years of Economic Folly – And the Stark Choices that Lie Ahead.] Praha: Academia. ISBN 978-80-200-2500-5.
- Lasch, Christopher (2016): Kultura narcismu : Americký život ve věku snižujících se očekávání. [The Culture of Narcissism : American Life in an Age of Diminishing Expectations.] Praha: Stanislav Juhaňák–Triton. ISBN 978-80-7553-000-4.
- Phillips, Anita (2016): Obrana masochismu. [A Defence of Masochism.] Praha: Volvox Globator. ISBN 978-80-7511-298-9.
- Wolynn, Mark (2017): Trauma : nechtěné dědictví : jak nás formuje zděděné rodinné trauma a jak je překonat. [It Didn't Start with You : How Inherited Family Trauma Shapes Who We Are and How to End the Cycle.] Praha: Stanislav Juhaňák–Triton. ISBN 978-80-7553-129-2.
- Washington, Harriet A. (2017): Doba jedová 8 : Infekční šílenství : Vakcíny, antibiotika, autismus, schizofrenie, viry. [Infectious madness : The Surprising Science of How We "Catch" Mental Illness.] Praha: Stanislav Juhaňák–Triton. ISBN 978-80-7553-343-2.
- Bollinger, Ty M. (2017): Pravda o rakovině : Vše, co potřebujete vědět o historii, léčbě a prevenci této zákeřné nemoci. [The Truth about Cancer : What You Need to Know about Cancer's History, Treatment, and Prevention.] Praha: Dobrovský s.r.o., Omega. ISBN 978-80-7390-592-7.
- Bakan, David (2017): Sigmund Freud a židovská mystická tradice. [Sigmund Freud and the Jewish Mystical Tradition.] Praha: Volvox Globator. ISBN 978-80-7511-363-4.
- Allender, Dan B. (2018): Léčba zraněného srdce : Bolest ze sexuálního zneužití a naděje na proměnu. [Healing the Wounded Heart : The Heartache of Sexual Abuse and the Hope of Transformation.] Praha: Stanislav Juhaňák–Triton. ISBN 978-80-7553-518-4.
- Mace, Nancy L; Rabins, Peter V. (2018): Alzheimer : Rodinný průvodce péčí o nemocné s Alzheimerovou chorobou a jinými demencemi : ztráta paměti, změny chování a nálad, jak vydržet v roli ošetřovatele, každodenní péče o blízké s demencí či ztrátou paměti. [The 36-Hour Day : A Family Guide to Caring for People Who Have Alzheimer Disease, Other Dementias, and Memory Loss.] Praha: Stanislav Juhaňák–Triton. ISBN 978-80-7553-583-2.
- Rooney, Anne (2018): Příběh psychologie : Od duchů k psychoterapii: naše mysl v průběhu věků. [The Story of Psychology : From Spirits to Psychotherapy: Tracing the Mind Through the Ages.] Praha: Dobrovský s.r.o., Omega. ISBN 978-80-7390-889-8.
- Perry, Gina (2019): Ztracení chlapci : Kontroverzní psychologický experiment Muzafera Sherifa ve Státním parku Robbers Cave. [The Lost Boys : Inside Muzafer Sherif's Robbers Cave Experiment.] Praha: Stanislav Juhaňák–Triton. ISBN 978-80-7553-667-9.
- Dworkin, Ronald M. (2021): Náboženství bez Boha. [Religion Without God.] Praha: Dybbuk. ISBN 978-80-7438-263-5.
- Cohen, David (2022): Freud na koksu. [Freud on Coke.] Praha: Malvern. ISBN 978-80-7530-365-3.

Awards and nominations

- Translation of the book Chandak Sengoopta Otto Weininger, Sex, Science, and Self in Imperial Vienna was nominated for the Academia Publishing House Prize for the translation of scientific or non-fiction work in 2009.

== Translations from French into Czech ==
- Cyrulnik, Boris (2020): Když si dítě sáhne na život. (Child Suicide.) [Quand un enfant se donne « la mort ».] Praha: Stanislav Juhaňák–Triton. ISBN 978-80-7553-788-1.
- Cyrulnik, Boris (2020): V noci jsem psal o slunci: Psaní jako prostředek terapie. (At Night, I Would Write Suns.) [La nuit, j'écrirai des soleils.] Praha: Stanislav Juhaňák–Triton. ISBN 978-80-7553-819-2.

== Literature ==
- Wernisch, Ivan (1994). Pekařova noční nůše. Brno: Petrov. p. 129. ISBN 80-85247-52-6.
- Machala, Lubomír (1996). Průvodce po nových jménech české poezie a prózy 1990–1995. Olomouc: Rubico. pp. 27, 107. ISBN 80-85839-13-X.
