= Bakan =

Bakan may refer to:

== People ==
- Bakan (surname)

== Places ==
- Bakan District in Pursat Province, Cambodia
- Wat Bakan, a pagoda in Bakan District
- Bakan, Iran (disambiguation)
- Bakan Rural District, an administrative division of Eqlid County, Fars province, Iran
- Shimonoseki, a city in Yamaguchi Prefecture, Japan, known before 1902 as Bakan (馬關)
