= Angakban =

Angakban انگكبان
- Village
- Location within Iran
- Coordinates: 30°30′15″N 52°28′47″E
- Country: Iran
- Province: Fars
- County: Eqlid
- Bakhsh: Hasanabad
- Rural District: Hasanabad

Population (2006)
  - Total: 378
- Time zone: UTC+3:30 (IRST)
  - Summer (DST): UTC+4:30 (IRDT)

Angakban (Persian: انگكبان, also Romanized as Angakbān and Engakbān; also known as Angalkabān and Enkakvān) is a village in Hasanabad Rural District, Hasanabad District, Eqlid County, Fars province, Iran. At the 2006 census, its population was 378, in 73 families.
