= Shahrak-e Jadid Ardali =

Shahrak-e Jadid Ardali شهرک جديد ارد علي
- Village
- Location within Iran
- Coordinates: 30°33′31″N 52°28′40″E
- Country: Iran
- Province: Fars
- County: Eqlid
- Bakhsh: Hasanabad
- Rural District: Hasanabad

Population (2006)
  - Total: 159
- Time zone: UTC+3:30 (IRST)
  - Summer (DST): UTC+4:30 (IRDT)

Shahrak-e Jadid Ardali (Persian: شهرک جديد ارد علي, also Romanized as Shahrak-e Jadīd Ard‘alī; also known as Shahrak-e Ard‘alī) is a village in Hasanabad Rural District, Hasanabad District, Eqlid County, Fars province, Iran. At the 2006 census, its population was 159, in 40 families.
