= Talou Sen Chey district =

Talou Sen Chey ស្រុកតាលោសែនជ័យ
- District (srok)
- Location in Cambodia
- Coordinates: 12°24′N 103°42′E
- Country: Cambodia
- Province: Pursat
- Communes: 2
- Villages: 35
- Time zone: +7
- Geocode: 1507

Talou Sen Chey (Khmer: ស្រុកតាលោសែនជ័យ) is a district in Pursat province, Cambodia. It was established on January 8, 2019, according to sub-decree no. 07 អនក្រ.បក by taking Talou Commune from Bakan district, and Phteah Rung Commune from Phnum Kravanh district. Two villages – Koh Svay and Koh Wat – of Khnar Totueng Commune, Bakan district became part of Talou commune. The district capital is at Phteah Rung Commune.

== Location ==
Bakan shares a border with Battambang province to the north and the district of Veal Veang to the northwest. To the south and west is Phnum Kravanh. Talou Sen Chey shares its eastern border with Bakan district.

== Administration ==
The following table shows the villages of Talou Sen Chey district by commune.

Code	Khum (communes)	Phum (villages)
150701	Ta Lou	Kouk Rumlo, Tuol Totueng, Tuol Thma, Buo Chres, Prey Roung, Ta Lou, Thmei, Tuol Chreav, Prey Tao, Boeng Kak, Prey Veang, Serei Kunthea, Trayang Sa, Chhnal Moan, Prey Kantuot, Tang Kouk, Baos Kor, Prahal, Rohal Til, Som Sant, Kaoh Svay, Kaoh Voat
150702	Phteah Rung	Kaoh Svay, Ta Sas, Kranham, Prey Kanlang, Thlok Dangkao, Bat Rumduol, Kandal, Phteah Rung, Damnak Kansaeng, Damnak Kansaeng, Prohoas Kbal, Chongruk, Chrey Kroem
