= Shahrak-e Ardkapan =

Shahrak-e Ardkapan شهرك اردكپان
- Village
- Location within Iran
- Coordinates: 30°30′39″N 52°18′17″E
- Country: Iran
- Province: Fars
- County: Eqlid
- Bakhsh: Hasanabad
- Rural District: Bakan

Population (2006)
  - Total: 390
- Time zone: UTC+3:30 (IRST)
  - Summer (DST): UTC+4:30 (IRDT)

Shahrak-e Ardkapan (Persian: شهرك اردكپان, also Romanized as Shahrak-e Ārdkapān) is a village in Bakan Rural District, Hasanabad District, Eqlid County, Fars province, Iran. At the 2006 census, its population was 390, in 79 families.
