= Shahrak-e Shahid Bahnar Jadval-e Now =

Shahrak-e Shahid Bahnar Jadval-e Now شهرك شهيدباهنرجدول نو
- Village
- Country: Iran
- Province: Fars
- County: Eqlid
- Bakhsh: Hasanabad
- Rural District: Hasanabad

Population (2006)
  - Total: 390
- Time zone: UTC+3:30 (IRST)
  - Summer (DST): UTC+4:30 (IRDT)

Shahrak-e Shahid Bahnar Jadval-e Now (Persian: شهرك شهيدباهنرجدول نو, also Romanized as Shahrak-e Shahīd Bāhnar Jadval-e Now) is a village in Hasanabad Rural District, Hasanabad District, Eqlid County, Fars province, Iran. At the 2006 census, its population was 390, in 84 families.
