= Shahr Ashub =

Shahr Ashub شهراشوب
- Village
- Location within Iran
- Coordinates: 30°30′17″N 52°31′45″E
- Country: Iran
- Province: Fars
- County: Eqlid
- Bakhsh: Hasanabad
- Rural District: Hasanabad

Population (2006)
  - Total: 492
- Time zone: UTC+3:30 (IRST)
  - Summer (DST): UTC+4:30 (IRDT)

Shahr Ashub (Persian: شهراشوب, also Romanized as Shahr Āshūb; also known as Shahr Ashaf) is a village in Hasanabad Rural District, Hasanabad District, Eqlid County, Fars province, Iran. At the 2006 census, its population was 492, in 111 families.
