= Shulan, Iran =

Shulan شولان
- Village
- Location within Iran
- Coordinates: 30°32′40″N 52°22′44″E
- Country: Iran
- Province: Fars
- County: Eqlid
- Bakhsh: Hasanabad
- Rural District: Hasanabad

Population (2006)
  - Total: 711
- Time zone: UTC+3:30 (IRST)
  - Summer (DST): UTC+4:30 (IRDT)

Shulan (Persian: شولان, also Romanized as Shūlān) is a village in Hasanabad Rural District, Hasanabad District, Eqlid County, Fars province, Iran. At the 2006 census, its population was 711, in 145 families.
