= Takht-e Chaman =

Takht-e Chaman تختچمن
- Village
- Location within Iran
- Coordinates: 30°21′17″N 52°42′42″E
- Country: Iran
- Province: Fars
- County: Eqlid
- Bakhsh: Hasanabad
- Rural District: Ahmadabad

Population (2006)
  - Total: 117
- Time zone: UTC+3:30 (IRST)
  - Summer (DST): UTC+4:30 (IRDT)

Takht-e Chaman (Persian: تختچمن) is a village in Ahmadabad Rural District, Hasanabad District, Eqlid County, Fars province, Iran. At the 2006 census, its population was 117, in 29 families.
