= Shahrak-e Qotlu =

Shahrak-e Qotlu شهرك قتلو
- Village
- Location within Iran
- Coordinates: 30°32′24″N 52°15′53″E
- Country: Iran
- Province: Fars
- County: Eqlid
- Bakhsh: Hasanabad
- Rural District: Bakan

Population (2006)
  - Total: 132
- Time zone: UTC+3:30 (IRST)
  - Summer (DST): UTC+4:30 (IRDT)

Shahrak-e Qotlu (Persian: شهرك قتلو, also Romanized as Shahrak-e Qotlū) is a village in Bakan Rural District, Hasanabad District, Eqlid County, Fars province, Iran. At the 2006 census, its population was 132, in 32 families.
