= Sir Banu =

Sir Banu سيربانو
- Village
- Location within Iran
- Coordinates: 30°19′00″N 52°48′21″E
- Country: Iran
- Province: Fars
- County: Eqlid
- Bakhsh: Hasanabad
- Rural District: Ahmadabad

Population (2006)
  - Total: 98
- Time zone: UTC+3:30 (IRST)
  - Summer (DST): UTC+4:30 (IRDT)

Sir Banu (Persian: سيربانو, also Romanized as Sīr Bānū; also known as Qal‘eh-ye Sīr Bānū) is a village in Ahmadabad Rural District, Hasanabad District, Eqlid County, Fars province, Iran. At the 2006 census, its population was 98, in 23 families.
