= Espahri =

Espahri اسپهري
- Village
- Location within Iran
- Coordinates: 30°28′13″N 52°31′53″E
- Country: Iran
- Province: Fars
- County: Eqlid
- Bakhsh: Hasanabad
- Rural District: Hasanabad

Population (2006)
  - Total: 99
- Time zone: UTC+3:30 (IRST)
  - Summer (DST): UTC+4:30 (IRDT)

Espahri (Persian: اسپهري, also Romanized as Espahrī; also known as Esparī) is a village in Hasanabad Rural District, Hasanabad District, Eqlid County, Fars province, Iran. At the 2006 census, its population was 99, in 22 families.
