= Laleh Gun =

Laleh Gun لاله گون
- Village
- Location within Iran
- Coordinates: 30°26′27″N 52°35′48″E
- Country: Iran
- Province: Fars
- County: Eqlid
- Bakhsh: Hasanabad
- Rural District: Ahmadabad

Population (2006)
  - Total: 544
- Time zone: UTC+3:30 (IRST)
  - Summer (DST): UTC+4:30 (IRDT)

Laleh Gun (Persian: لاله گون, also Romanized as Lāleh Gūn; also known as Lālgān) is a village in Ahmadabad Rural District, Hasanabad District, Eqlid County, Fars province, Iran. At the 2006 census, its population was 544, in 130 families.
