= Qadamabad =

Qadamabad قدم اباد
- Village
- Location within Iran
- Coordinates: 30°34′32″N 52°27′50″E
- Country: Iran
- Province: Fars
- County: Eqlid
- Bakhsh: Hasanabad
- Rural District: Hasanabad

Population (2006)
  - Total: 193
- Time zone: UTC+3:30 (IRST)
  - Summer (DST): UTC+4:30 (IRDT)

Qadamabad (Persian: قدم اباد, also Romanized as Qadamābād; also known as Qadīmābād) is a village in Hasanabad Rural District, Hasanabad District, Eqlid County, Fars province, Iran. At the 2006 census, its population was 193, in 40 families.
