= Allahabad, Fars =

Allahabad الله‌آباد
- Village
- Location within Iran
- Coordinates: 30°31′22″N 52°30′08″E
- Country: Iran
- Province: Fars
- County: Eqlid
- Bakhsh: Hasanabad
- Rural District: Hasanabad

Population (2006)
  - Total: 243
- Time zone: UTC+3:30 (IRST)
  - Summer (DST): UTC+4:30 (IRDT)

Allahabad (Persian: الله‌آباد, also Romanized as Allāhābād) is a village in Hasanabad Rural District, Hasanabad District, Eqlid County, Fars province, Iran. At the 2006 census, its population was 243, in 67 families.
