= Kana (disambiguation) =

Kana is a system of Japanese writing composed of Katakana and Hiragana.

Kana may also refer to:

== Media and technology ==
- Kana (publisher), a French publishing company
- Kana Software, a software company
- Kana TV, a private television station of Ethiopia
- KANA, a defunct radio station (580 AM) formerly licensed to Anaconda, Montana, United States

== People ==
- Kana (given name), a Japanese given name (including a list of persons with the name)
- Kana (surname)
- Kana (rapper) (born 1977)
- Kana, Japanese musician and member of Chai
- Kana (wrestler), currently using the ring name "Asuka"

== Places ==
- Kana (Lycaonia), ancient town now in Turkey
- Kana, Burkina Faso, a village in Balé Province
- Kana Cone, a hill in British Columbia, Canada
- Kana (river), a river in Murmansk Oblast, Russia
- Cana, sometimes spelled as Kana, a place in Galilee mentioned in the Gospels

== Language ==
- Kana dialect, a variety of Cebuano, a language of the Philippines
- Katakana (ISO 15924 code: Kana)
- Khana language, spoken by the Ogoni people of Nigeria

== Other uses ==
- A term used in Japanese poetry such as haiku
- Kana, a genus of leafhoppers
- An alternative name used for the Ogoni people of Nigeria

== See also ==
- Cana (disambiguation)
- Imatto-canna (also written Imatto canna or Jamatto canna) was a false Japanese syllabary
- Kanna (disambiguation)
- Kanaa (disambiguation)
- Qana, also transliterated Kana, a Lebanese village
