= Shahrak-e Shahid Motahhari =

Shahrak-e Shahid Motahhari شهرك شهيدمطهري
- town
- Location within Iran
- Coordinates: 30°28′16″N 52°33′52″E
- Country: Iran
- Province: Fars
- County: Eqlid
- Bakhsh: Hasanabad
- Rural District: Hasanabad

Population (2006)
  - Total: 236
- Time zone: UTC+3:30 (IRST)
  - Summer (DST): UTC+4:30 (IRDT)

Shahrak-e Shahid Motahhari (Persian: شهرك شهيدمطهري, also Romanized as Shahrak-e Shahīd Moţahharī) is a village in Hasanabad Rural District, Hasanabad District, Eqlid County, Fars province, Iran. At the 2006 census, its population was 236, in 48 families.
