= Emamzadeh Esmail, Fars =

Village in Fars province, Iran

Emamzadeh Esmail Persian: امامزاده اسماعيل
- Village
- Location within Iran
- Coordinates: 30°19′12″N 52°35′15″E
- Country: Iran
- Province: Fars
- County: Eqlid
- District: Hasanabad
- Rural District: Ahmadabad

Population (2016)
  - Total: 2,178
- Time zone: UTC+3:30 (IRST)

Emamzadeh Esmail (Persian: امامزاده اسماعيل) (Note: Also romanized as Emāmzādeh Esmā‘īl) is a village in Ahmadabad Rural District of Hasanabad District, Eqlid County, Fars province, Iran.

== Demographics ==
=== Population ===
At the time of the 2006 National Census, the village's population was 1,990 in 476 households. The following census in 2011 counted 1,828 people in 470 households. The 2016 census measured the population of the village as 2,178 people in 578 households. It was the most populous village in its rural district.
