= Moat Preah =

Coordinates: 12°05′N 103°08′E

Moat Preah is a village in Pursat Province of western Cambodia. The village lies to the south of Tumpor and north-west of Veal Veng.
