= Ahmadabad, Eqlid =

Village in Fars province, Iran

Ahmadabad Persian: احمداباد
- Village
- Location within Iran
- Coordinates: 30°23′23″N 52°41′15″E
- Country: Iran
- Province: Fars
- County: Eqlid
- District: Hasanabad
- Rural District: Ahmadabad

Population (2016)
  - Total: 636
- Time zone: UTC+3:30 (IRST)

Ahmadabad (Persian: احمداباد) (Note: Also romanized as Aḩmadābād) is a village in, and the capital of, Ahmadabad Rural District of Hasanabad District, Eqlid County, Fars province, Iran.

== Demographics ==
=== Population ===
At the time of the 2006 National Census, the village's population was 628 in 134 households. The following census in 2011 counted 588 people in 146 households. The 2016 census measured the population of the village as 636 people in 172 households.
