= Ardali =

Village in Fars province, Iran

Ardali Persian: اردعلي
- Village
- Location within Iran
- Coordinates: 30°32′39″N 52°26′40″E
- Country: Iran
- Province: Fars
- County: Eqlid
- District: Hasanabad
- Rural District: Hasanabad

Population (2016)
  - Total: 704
- Time zone: UTC+3:30 (IRST)

Ardali (Persian: اردعلي) (Note: Also romanized as Ārd ‘Alī and Ard‘alī; also known as Ard ‘Alī-ye Chāvoshī and Ardeh ‘Alī) is a village in Hasanabad Rural District of Hasanabad District, Eqlid County, Fars province, Iran.

== Demographics ==
=== Population ===
At the time of the 2006 National Census, the village's population was 701 in 140 households. The following census in 2011 counted 776 people in 194 households. The 2016 census measured the population of the village as 704 people in 189 households. It was the most populous village in its rural district.
