= Kanna =

Kanna may refer to:

== Plants ==
- Mesembryanthemum tortuosum, syn. Sceletium tortuosum, a Southern African succulent with psychoactive properties
- Platysace cirrosa, a Western Australian perennial herb
- Caroxylon aphyllum, a shrub

== Japan ==
- Kanna (era), a Japanese name for the years 985–987
- Kanna or Japanese plane, a wood working tool

== Art and entertainment ==
=== Film & TV ===
- Kanna (film), a 2007 Indian movie
- Kanna Kamui, a main character from the Japanese anime/manga Miss Kobayashi's Dragon Maid
- Cegléd water jug, Ceglédi kanna, or kanna, Hungarian water vessel serving as Romani folk musical instrument

== People ==
- Ali Kanna (born 1945), Libyan lieutenant general
- Kanna (given name), a feminine Japanese given name
- Khalil Kanna, Kingdom of Iraq politician
- Yonadam Kanna (born 1951), president of the Assyrian Democratic Movement and member of the Iraqi Parliament

== Places ==
- Kanna (Lycaonia), ancient town now in Turkey
- Kanna, Gunma, a town in Gunma Prefecture, Japan
- Kanna, Poland, a village in southern Poland

== See also ==
- Kannas (disambiguation)
- Kana (disambiguation)
- Canna (disambiguation)
- Kannan
