= Dordaneh, Eqlid =

Dordaneh دردانه
- Village
- Location within Iran
- Coordinates: 30°20′31″N 52°44′48″E
- Country: Iran
- Province: Fars
- County: Eqlid
- Bakhsh: Hasanabad
- Rural District: Ahmadabad

Population (2006)
  - Total: 404
- Time zone: UTC+3:30 (IRST)
  - Summer (DST): UTC+4:30 (IRDT)

Dordaneh (Persian: دردانه, also Romanized as Dordāneh; also known as Dūrdāneh) is a village in Ahmadabad Rural District, Hasanabad District, Eqlid County, Fars province, Iran. At the 2006 census, its population was 404, in 77 families.
