= Deh Kheyr, Fars =

Deh Kheyr ده خير
- Village
- Location within Iran
- Coordinates: 30°33′22″N 52°25′31″E
- Country: Iran
- Province: Fars
- County: Eqlid
- Bakhsh: Hasanabad
- Rural District: Hasanabad

Population (2006)
  - Total: 401
- Time zone: UTC+3:30 (IRST)
  - Summer (DST): UTC+4:30 (IRDT)

Deh Kheyr (Persian: ده خير) is a village in Hasanabad Rural District, Hasanabad District, Eqlid County, Fars province, Iran. At the 2006 census, its population was 401, in 78 families.
