= Kandieng district =

Kandieng កណ្ដៀង
- District
- Kandieng District; ស្រុកកណ្ដៀង
- Location in Cambodia
- Coordinates: 12°34′N 104°2′E
- Country: Cambodia
- Province: Pursat
- Communes: 9
- Villages: 113

Population (1998)
  - Total: 53,335
- Time zone: UTC+07:00 (ITC)
- Geocode: 1502

Kandieng (Khmer: កណ្ដៀង [kɑnɗiəŋ]) is a district in Pursat province, Cambodia. The district capital is at Kandieng town located about 12 km from the Provincial capital Pursat.

== Location ==
Kandieng shares a border with the districts of Bakan to the west, Sampov Meas to the south and Krakor to the east. The northern part of the district encompasses a portion of the Tonle Sap lake and there is one settlement on the edge of the lake at Reang Til. This is a Tonle Sap floating village and the location moves depending on the water level in the lake.

According to the 1998 Census, Kandieng district is made up of 9 communes and 113 villages. The population of the district was 53,335 in 10,148 households at the time of the last census.

== Administration ==
The following table shows the villages of Kandieng district by commune.

Khum (communes)	Phum (villages)
Anlong Vil	Tuol Char, Ou Ba Krang, Voat Pou Ti Muoy, Voat Pou Ti Pir, Kampong Krabei, Phlov Krabei, Kanhcheu Bay Dach, Anlong Vil, Preaek Ta Vong, Preaek Ta Kong, Kaoh Krasang, Preaek Chheu Trav, Chey Chumneah, Boeng Chhuk, Phteah Kor, Kbal Romeas
Kandieng	Kampong Roka, Kaev Chey, Svay Yeang, Kandieng Knong, Kandieng, Sthani, Yos, Prey Kdei Leu, Prey Kdei Kandal, Prey Kdei Kraom, Sya, Bangkoul, Stueng Leu, Stueng Kraom, Kampong Krasang Leu, Kampong Krasang Kraom, Boeng Chhuk
Kanhchor	Kanhchor, Boeng Kranh, Preaek Trabaek, Samraong, Roleang, Tuol Totueng, Pou Andaet, Koun Kray, Dang Ou, Phlov Luong, Tbaeng Bangkeab, Kandal
Reang Til	Reang Til, Preaek, Charaoh, Kaoh Kaev, Kaoh K'aek
Srae Sdok	Banteay Traok, Chamkar Ta Pou, Phteah Kaoh, Saen Chey, Veal, Sarieng, Kdei Chhvit, Ta Mao Li, Pring Khpos, Trang, Thlea Ampil, Thmei, Chamreh, Bakur, Pou, Pou Pir, Entheakthyea
Svay Luong	Boeng Kranh, Roung Masin, Svay Luong, Svay Chan, Phlov Pouthi Vongs, Svay Chambak, Pou Laeung, Ka Kou, Sanlung, Svay Yeang, Phteah Srae, Chreaeng, Chheu Teal
Sya	Kampong Sambuor, Anlong Vil, Charuek, Boeng Chak, Kbal Peam, Trapeang Thma, Kbal Chheu Puk, Sya, Thlok, Prey Srakum, Voat Lieb
Veal	Kbal Hong, Pralay Thum, Veal, Pou Kambaor, Kanhcheu Bay Dach, Pou Damnak, Boeng Yea, Ta Sdei, Tuol Pongro
Kaoh Chum	Anlong Hab, Spean, Dang Rung, Dang Lang, Sdok Chum, Damrei Sa, Phteah Pring, Kien, Ampil Kanhchrinh, Tuol Ku

== Characteristics ==
Kandieng is home to several villages of traditional sculptors who work in marble. Buddhist statues and animal carvings are in strong demand and pieces from Kandieng are sold as far away as Phnom Penh and Siem Reap. The marble is quarried in the Cardamom Mountains in Veal Veang district and often transported to Kandieng via oxcart. In these villages marble carving is a skill that has been handed down through families over generations.

Although there are many execution sites in Pursat, Kandieng is also home to one of the major execution sites (sometimes called killing fields) of the Khmer Rouge in Pursat province. It is located near Srae Sdok about 6 kilometres from the Tonle Sap. The Tuol Purchrey killing site was a military fort for government soldiers during the Lon Nol period. Systematic executions were carried out at Tuol Purchrey from 1975 until 1978. People were transported to the site in large trucks, ordered out, tied up at gun point, and marched to be killed. Local researchers who visited and mapped the site interviewing surviving eyewitnesses estimated that over 10,000 people were executed here over 3 years.
