= Dordaneh =

Dordaneh (Persian: دردانه) may refer to:

- Dordaneh, Eqlid
- Dordaneh, Kazerun
