= Kenas =

Kenas or Kannas (Persian: كناس) may refer to:

- Kenas-e Olya
- Kenas-e Sofla

== See also ==
- Kanna (disambiguation)
