= Kenas-e Olya =

Kenas-e Olya كناس عليا
- Village
- Location within Iran
- Coordinates: 30°26′23″N 52°33′28″E
- Country: Iran
- Province: Fars
- County: Eqlid
- Bakhsh: Hasanabad
- Rural District: Hasanabad

Population (2006)
  - Total: 152
- Time zone: UTC+3:30 (IRST)
  - Summer (DST): UTC+4:30 (IRDT)

Kenas-e Olya (Persian: كناس عليا, also Romanized as Kenās-e 'Olyā; also known as Kannās, Kannās-e Zarghāmī, Kenās, Kenās-e Bālā, and Kenās-e Ẕarghāji) is a village in Hasanabad Rural District, Hasanabad District, Eqlid County, Fars province, Iran. At the 2006 census, its population was 152, in 29 families.
