= Kenas-e Sofla =

Kenas-e Sofla كناس سفلي
- Village
- Location within Iran
- Coordinates: 30°27′17″N 52°33′21″E
- Country: Iran
- Province: Fars
- County: Eqlid
- Bakhsh: Hasanabad
- Rural District: Hasanabad

Population (2006)
  - Total: 350
- Time zone: UTC+3:30 (IRST)
  - Summer (DST): UTC+4:30 (IRDT)

Kenas-e Sofla (Persian: كناس سفلي, also Romanized as Kenās-e Soflá and Kannās-e Soflá; also known as Kannās, Kenās-e Pā’īn, and Ūjan) is a village in Hasanabad Rural District, Hasanabad District, Eqlid County, Fars province, Iran. At the 2006 census, its population was 350, in 71 families.
