= Kana (given name) =

- Gender: Female

Origin
- Origin: Japanese
- Meaning: Different meanings depending on the kanji used

Kana (written: 佳奈, 香奈, 香菜, 可奈, 加奈, 加那, 華菜, 夏菜, 夏南, 果奈, かな in hiragana or カナ in katakana) is a feminine Japanese given name. Notable people with the name include:

- Kana (wrestler), professional wrestler
- Kana Abe (阿部 香菜; born 1988), Japanese judoka
- Kana Asumi (阿澄 佳奈), (born 1983) Japanese voice actress and singer
- Kana Ichikawa (市川 華菜; born 1991), Japanese sprinter
- Kana Ichinose (市ノ瀬 加那), Japanese voice actress
- Kana Ito (伊東 可奈; born 1985), Japanese badminton player
- Kana Hanazawa (花澤 香菜; born 1989), Japanese voice actress, actress and singer
- Kana Kawakami (川上 佳奈; born 1984), Japanese volleyball player
- Kana Kobayashi (小林 香菜; born 1991), Japanese idol and singer
- Kana Kobayashi (小林 香菜; born 2001), Japanese athlete
- Kana Kurashina (倉科 カナ; born 1987), Japanese actress
- Kana Mannami (万波 佳奈; born 1983), Japanese Go player
- Kana Mitsugi (三樹 加奈; born 1992), Japanese rugby sevens player
- Kana Morimoto (森本 佳奈; born 1992), Japanese kickboxer
- Kana Muramoto (村元 哉中; born 1993), Japanese figure skater
- Kana Nakada (中田 花奈), Japanese mahjong player, television personality, entrepreneur, and author
- Kana Nishino (西野 カナ; born 1989), Japanese pop singer
- Kana Ōno (大野 果奈; born 1992), Japanese volleyball player
- Kana Oya (大屋 夏南; born 1987), Japanese model
- Kana Oyama (大山 加奈; born 1984), Japanese volleyball player
- Kana Satomi (里見 香奈; born 1992), Japanese shogi player
- Kana Shibutani (渋谷 佳奈; born 1979), Japanese professional wrestler
- Kana Tachibana (橘 佳奈; born 1985), Japanese pop singer
- Kana Tsugihara (つぎはら かな; born 1984), Japanese actress, model and idol
- Kana Ueda (植田 佳奈; born 1980), Japanese singer and voice actress
- Kana Yamawaki (山脇 佳奈; born 1984), Japanese gymnast
- Kana Yazumi (矢住 夏菜; born 1985), Japanese singer-songwriter

== Fictional characters ==
- Kana, a character in the dating sim Bunny Garden
- Kana, a character from the manga series Fairy Tail
- Kana, a character from the video game Fire Emblem Fates
- Kana, an incarnation of Naraku from the manga series Inuyasha
- Kana, a character from the children's animated series Thomas and Friends: All Engines Go!
- Kana Akaba/Akabane, the mother of the main protagonist, Aiga Akaba from the anime and manga series Beyblade Burst Chouzetsu/Turbo.
- Kana Anaberal, a character from the video game franchise Touhou Project
- Kana Arima (有馬 かな), a character from the manga and anime series Oshi no Ko
- Kana Aibara (相原 香奈), a character from the video game Ordyne
- Kana Fujiwara (藤原加奈), a character from the video game Tom Clancy's Rainbow Six Siege
- Kana Iwata (岩田 カナ), a character from the anime series Hamtaro
- Kana Kimishima (君嶋 加奈), a character from the manga series Parasyte
- Kana Minami (南 夏奈), a character from the manga series Minami-ke
- Kana Nakamachi (中町 かな), a character from the manga series Kanamemo
- Kana Nakamura, a character from the anime and manga series Nichijou
- Kana Todo, a character from the video game Kana: Little Sister
- Kana Ushiro (宇白 可奈), a character from the manga series Bokurano: Ours
- Kana Yano, a character from the horror film Noroi: The Curse
- Kana Yuki (夕城 香菜), a character from the dystopian action film Battle Royale II: Requiem

== See also ==
- Kana (disambiguation)
- Kana (surname)
- Kanna (given name)
- Kaja (name)
