= Mehr Ali Farsi Castle =

Castle in Fars province, Iran

Mehr Ali Farsi castle
- قلعه مهر علی فارسی

General information
- Type: Castle
- Location: Eqlid County, Iran

Mehr Ali Farsi castle (Persian: قلعه مهر علی فارسی) is a historical castle located in Eqlid County in Fars province, The longevity of this fortress dates back to the Prehistoric times of ancient Iran.
