= Pursat Municipality =

Pursat municipality ក្រុងពោធិ៍សាត់ Krong Pursat
- Municipality
- Location in Cambodia
- Coordinates: 12°32′N 103°55′E
- Country: Cambodia
- Province: Pursat
- Capital: Pursat

Government
  - Type: City Municipality
  - Mayor: Chay Matinal (CPP)

Population (2008)
  - Total: 58,846
- Time zone: UTC+7 (ICT)
- Geocode: 1505

Pursat municipality (Khmer: ក្រុងពោធិ៍សាត់) is a municipality in Pursat province, Cambodia. The provincial capital Pursat is located within the municipality. The municipality was formerly known as Sampov Meas district (Khmer: ស្រុកសំពៅមាស).

== Location ==
Pursat is located in the center of the most populated part of the province. The district is completely surrounded by other districts and is the only district in Pursat that shares no border with another province. North of Pursat lies Kandieng district, while Bakan forms the northeastern and eastern borders. Phnum Kravanh is to the south and Krakor forms the western boundary along National Highway Number Five. This is the smallest district in Pursat province by land area and has the highest population density.

The Pursat River, which begins in the Northern Cardamoms, flows through the center of the district at Pursat town on its way to the Tonle Sap. There are small parks alongside the river where urban residents of Pursat often come to sit in the cool of the evening.

== Administration ==
No.	Sangkat code	Sangkat (quarters)
1	1505-01	Chamraoen Phal សង្កាត់ចំរើនផល
3	1505-03	Lolok Sa សង្កាត់លលកស
4	1505-04	Phteah Prey សង្កាត់ផ្ទះព្រៃ
5	1505-05	Prey Nhi សង្កាត់ព្រៃញី
6	1505-06	Roleab សង្កាត់រលាប
7	1505-07	Svay At សង្កាត់ស្វាយអាត់
8	1505-08	Banteay Dei សង្កាត់បន្ទាយដី

== Characteristics ==
The provincial capital Pursat town is located in Pursat Municipality, 188 kilometres from Phnom Penh by road. This is considered to be an urban rather than a rural district. According to the 1998 Census, Sampov Meas district is made up of 7 communes and 64 villages. The population of the district was 57,523 in 10,856 households at the time of the last census.

The national highway and the only north-south rail link in the country bisect the district and thus all villages in the district have excellent access to goods and services. The provincial hospital is located in Pursat town and there are numerous schools and other services available. Sampov Meas district also hosts a campus of the University of Management and Economics in the provincial capital.
