= Krakor district =

Krakor ស្រុកក្រគរ
- District (srok)
- Location in Cambodia
- Coordinates: 12°31′N 104°12′E
- Country: Cambodia
- Province: Pursat
- Communes: 11
- Villages: 103

Population (1998)
  - Total: 74,222
- Time zone: +7
- Geocode: 1503

Krakor (Khmer: ស្រុកក្រគរ) is a district in Pursat province, Cambodia. The district capital is Krakor town located 25 kilometres east of the provincial capital, Pursat town.

== Location ==
Krakor is the easternmost district of Pursat province and borders Kampong Chhnang province to the east. To the north the district encompasses a portion of the Tonle Sap lake and there are several villages on the edge of the lake. These are Tonle Sap floating villages and their location moves depending on the water level in the lake. The districts of Kandieng and Sampov Meas form the eastern border and Phnum Kravanh district lies to the south. The district capital is at Krakor town, which is located on National Highway Number 5 about 160 kilometres by road from Phnom Penh.

== Administration ==
The following table shows the villages of Krakor district by commune.

Khum (communes)	Phum (villages)
Anlong Tnaot	Chrolorng, Thkoul Thum, Kandal, Phsar, Tuol Mkak, La Bak, Khla Krapeu, Tonsay Kol, Khleang Moeung, Banteay Krang, Papet, Totueng
Ansa Chambak	Khsach L'et, Thkoul Thum, Thkoul Touch, Arang Pruoch, Kampong Thkoul, San Sar, Kbal Damrei
Boeng Kantuot	Thmei, Kandor Sa, Trapeang Khley, Chochork, Trapeang Kantuot, Boeng, Ou Anhchanh, Pou Khoeun, Pou Angkrang, Thlea M'am, Ta Kaev Kraom
Chheu Tom	Tuol Tbaeng, Kandal, Phteah Chek, Chheu Teaeb, Cham Chas, Cham Thmei, Kapas, Dangkieb Kdam, Kbal Teahean, Bamnak, Tean Prey, Kapas Leu
Kampong Luong	Phum Ti Muoy, Phum Ti Pir, Phum Ti Bei, Phum Ti Buon, Phum Ti Pram
Kampong Pou	Chek Chau, Pou Kod, Kampong La, Moat Prey, Pou Robang, Roluos Kandal, Roluos Khang Kaeut, Sna Reach
Kbal Trach	Totueng, Doung, Phsar, Trapeang Rumdenh, Trapeang Smach, Chheu Teal Khpos, Kampong Leu, Samraong, Kandal, Srae Ruessei, Kralanh
Ou Sandan	Ou Ach Kok, Krang Thum, Thnoeng, Puttream, Doung Chuor, Ou Ta Prok, Chong Khlong, Ou Sandan
Sna Ansa	Sna Ansa, Krang Veaeng, Beng, Chi Cheh, Veal Vong, Sarovoan, Svay Sa, Thmei, Ansa Kdam, Kampong Prak
Svay Sa	Kamraeng, Trapeang Snuol, Ansa Chambak, Tuol Andaet, Boeng Smok, Ou Chan
Tnaot Chum	Prey Khla, Krabei Sa, Bangkong Khmum, Dang Tuek Leach, Chambak Thum, Tbaeng Chrum, Tram, Choar Mkean, Boeng Veal, Thmei, Kandal, Chheu Teal, Ta Kaev Leu, Saen Pen, Dambouk 100

== Characteristics ==
According to the 1998 Census, Krakor district is made up of 11 communes and 103 villages. The population of the district was 74,222 in 14,347 households at the time of the last census.

The national highway and the only north–south rail link in the country bisect the district and thus most villages in the district have comparatively good access to goods and services. There is a former district Hospital at Krakor town and the provincial capital and higher level services are only a short distance away. There is an active market that spills over onto the highway at Krakor town and this combined with the recent resurfacing of the highway has led to increasing traffic accidents and road fatalities.

== Fishing Conflicts ==
Located on the Tonle Sap, Krakor district is well known for fishing and prahok trey ngiet and other fish products are exported to markets in Pursat and Phnom Penh. Most of these fish are collected by floating fishing villages in the northern part of the district, near the district town. These villagers have had an uneasy relationship with Fishery Administration officials over claims of illegal fishing in protected areas of the lake. In April 2007 this unease culminated in an incident that led to the deaths of three fishermen and the torching of the commune fisheries office. Three fishermen, including a pregnant woman, were shot and killed with AK-47s by a group of Fisheries officials who claimed they were attacked by the fishermen.
