= Bakan (surname) =

Bakan is a surname. Notable people with the surname include:

- Abigail Bakan (born 1954), Canadian academic
- David Bakan (1921–2004), American-Canadian psychologist and professor
- George Bakan (1941–2020), American newspaper editor and LGBT rights activist
- Joel Bakan (born 1959), American-Canadian lawyer, writer and academic
- Michael Bakan, American academic
- Seda Bakan (born 1985), Turkish actress
