= Deh Kheyr =

Deh Kheyr or Deh Khair (Persian: ده خير) may refer to:

- Deh Kheyr, Fars
- Deh Kheyr-e Pain, Fars Province
- Deh Kheyr, Semnan
- Deh Kheyr, Tehran
