= Bakon =

Bakon may refer to:

- Bacon vodka
- Bakon, Iran (disambiguation)
