= Bakan, Fars =

Village in Fars province, Iran

Bakan Persian: بكان
- Village
- Location within Iran
- Coordinates: 30°24′04″N 52°24′17″E
- Country: Iran
- Province: Fars
- County: Eqlid
- District: Hasanabad
- Rural District: Bakan

Population (2016)
  - Total: 1,144
- Time zone: UTC+3:30 (IRST)

Bakan (Persian: بكان) (Note: Also romanized as Bakān) is a village in, and the capital of, Bakan Rural District of Hasanabad District, Eqlid County, Fars province, Iran.

== Demographics ==
=== Population ===
At the time of the 2006 National Census, the village's population was 1,211 in 267 households. The following census in 2011 counted 1,244 people in 355 households. The 2016 census measured the population of the village as 1,144 people in 356 households. It was the most populous village in its rural district.
