= Skolimowski =

Skolimowski (feminine Skolimowska) is a Polish surname. It may refer to:

- Henryk Skolimowski (1930–2018), Polish philosopher
- Jerzy Skolimowski (born 1938), Polish film director
- Jerzy Skolimowski (1907–1985), Polish rowing coxswain
- Kamila Skolimowska (1982–2009), Polish hammer thrower
- Robert Skolimowski (born 1956), Polish weightlifter
