= Ujan, Iran =

Ujan (Persian: اوجان) in Iran may refer to:

- Ujan, Alborz
- Ujan, Fars
- Ujan-e Gharbi Rural District, in East Azerbaijan Province
- Ujan-e Sharqi Rural District, in East Azerbaijan Province
