= Unmitigated communion =

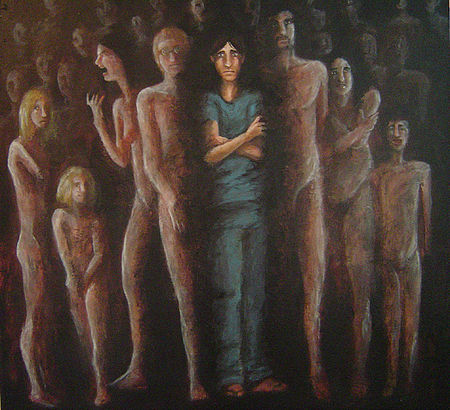
Unmitigated communion is frequently correlated with psychological problems

In psychology, unmitigated communion is focusing on others while excluding an individual's self. It is opposed to unmitigated agency, which is focusing on self while excluding others. Unmitigated communion is portrayed as a way of being concerned with others excessively and placing other human beings' needs or wants before one's own. Unmitigated communion and unmitigated agency are also correlated with unusual behaviour and psychological problems.

== Background and history ==
Unmitigated communion was first introduced by David Bakan in the year 1966. Unmitigated communion originated from an analysis of two aspects of behaviour and personality: agency and communion. Bakan defined communion as a focus on relationship or interrelation with others and a focus that more characterises women compared to men in the culture, whereas agency indicates the focus on an individual's self or autonomy. It is believed that communion is referred to as a measure of psychological femininity. However, it is claimed that now communion is perceived to reflect a particular part of female gender-related traits, a communal orientation. Bakan (1996) had never explicitly pinpointed the construct of unmitigated communion, which was developed by other psychologists such as Vicki S. Helgeson and Heidi L. Fritz. Nevertheless, Bakan believed that high levels of communion could be mitigated by a personal sense of agency. Thus, the agency in the unmitigated communion is absolutely absent. Unmitigated communion is different from communion as unmitigated communion is the exaggerated version of communion. Communion can be viewed as a caring act toward other people in a positive way, whereas unmitigated communion can be seen as a psychological distress. In addition, communion is associated with the belief that other individuals are valuable, while unmitigated communion is not affiliated with any good or bad view of others.

== Causes of unmitigated communion ==
A study from Carnegie Mellon University shows that there are four main causes of unmitigated communion behaviour which includes the way a person was raised, modelling of a family member especially mother, lack of self-esteem as well as genetics. However, the most accurate and possible cause for unmitigated communion is the combination of genetics, which might be inherited from parents, and socialisation, where the environment and surroundings affect the way a person behaves. For instance, poor and unsupportive family surroundings and social environment would lead to high unmitigated communion behaviour. It is claimed that adolescents with high unmitigated communion would more likely to be raised in a family with less expressive parents. In addition, an individual with high unmitigated communion would tend to come from less cohesive family.

== Roles of unmitigated communion ==
=== Over-involvement with others ===
Over-involvement with others means that people with high unmitigated communion are too unreasonably involved in other people's problems and treat others' issues as their own. Additionally, high unmitigated communion individuals tend to feel responsible for helping others and frequently have thoughts about other individuals' problems. Therefore, the higher a person scores at unmitigated communion, the more frequent and common that person would be involved in others' problems and be affected. In addition, an individual with strong unmitigated communion would tend to feel more stressful events eventuates.

==== Caretaking ====
Caretaking refers to an action where individuals with unmitigated communion are more strongly correlated to support provision compared to communion. Therefore, individuals with high unmitigated communion would tend to exhibit "helping behaviours" in an extreme way. In a study about adjustment to heart disease, couples who scored relatively high in unmitigated communion would be more likely to be overprotective with the other partner. In addition, according to a study of college students and adults, unmitigated communion is associated with self-reports of interpersonal problems such as intrusive, overly nurturant, as well as self-sacrificing.

==== Imbalanced relationship ====
An imbalanced relationship is a situation where individuals with high unmitigated communion would feel uncomfortable receiving support from others. One reason for the imbalanced relationship is that individuals with unmitigated communion assume that not receiving any help from others could control over the relationship among friends. Individuals characterised by unmitigated communion do not expect that others would support as they are afraid that others would not respond to the needs. Therefore, unmitigated communion individuals would be more likely to drop the expectations to minimise any disappointment. People with high unmitigated communion also feel that their problems should not burden others to avoid damage in the relationship.

==== Motives for helping ====
The motives for helping are likely to be different for individuals with high unmitigated communion than for people with high communion. Although unmitigated communion and communion are similar as they are correlated with providing support and related to empathy, the motives are entirely different. Individuals with high communion would tend to help out others genuinely. However, individuals who scored high on unmitigated communion would be more likely to help others in order to improve their self worth in front of others

=== Neglect of the self ===
Individuals with high unmitigated communion are correlated with self-neglect indicators, which include being exploitable, difficulties in declaring one's needs, and hindering self-effacement from keeping away from conflict with others. The higher an individual's score on unmitigated communion, the stronger the feeling of responsibility for others. Thus, it would be less likely for them to prioritise themselves.

=== Externalised self-evaluation ===
Externalised self-evaluation is defined as basing an individual's self-evaluation on what other people think. It is believed that the mixture of both externalised self-evaluation and the belief of negative opinion from others would lead to low self-esteem as well as subsequent depressive symptoms. For instance, in a relationship, a person who scored high in unmitigated communion would be more emotional than a person who scored lower. Additionally, people with high unmitigated communion would more likely to evaluate themselves based on the other's opinions, and they would tend to be pessimistic if they cannot meet the society and others' opinions and expectations.

== Unmitigated communion in gender ==
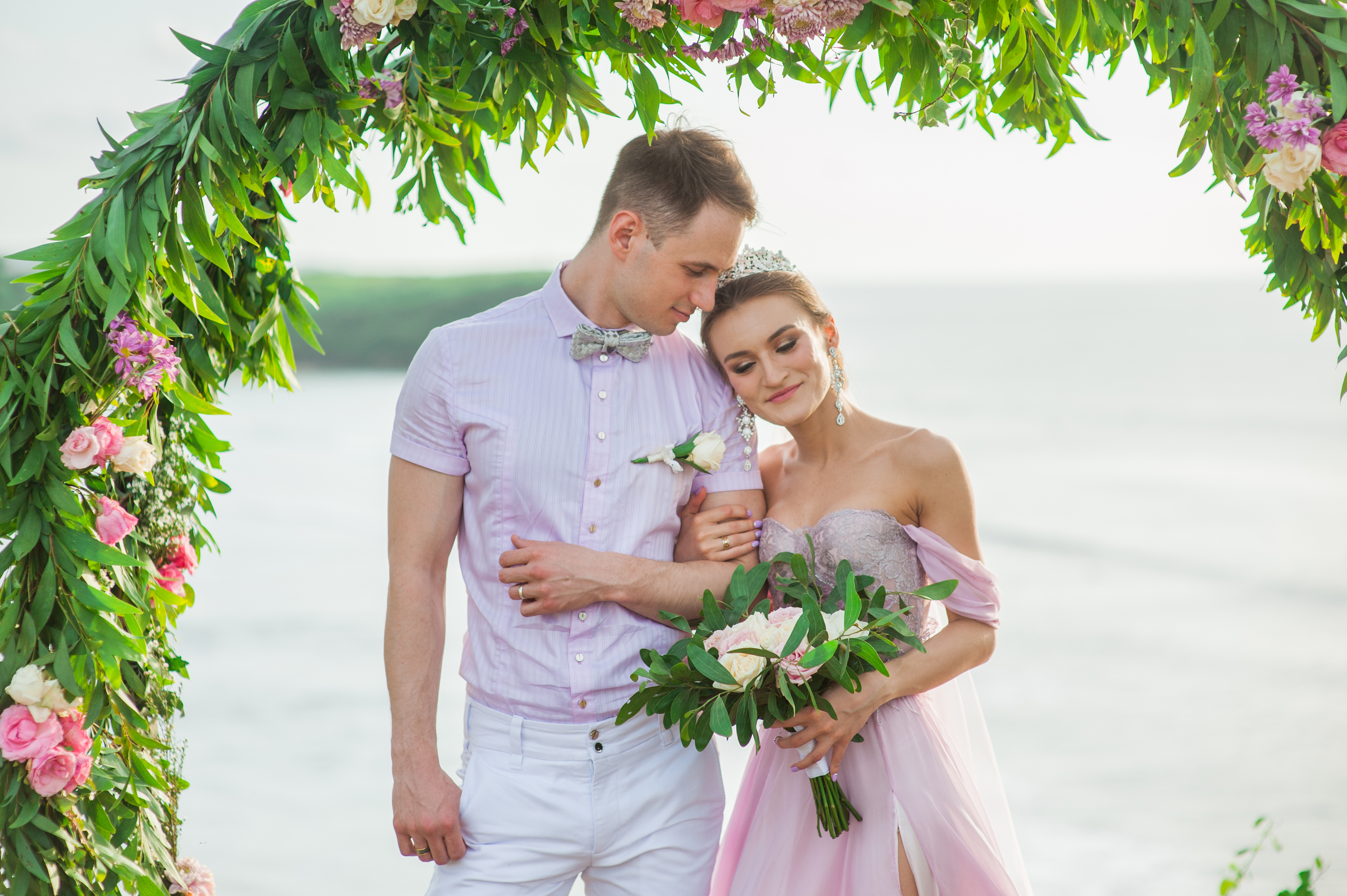
Gender in the theory of unmitigated communion

In 1966, Bakan claimed that there are two modes of existence, which includes agency and communion. Self-enhancement and self-assertion would be correlated with the agency, whereas society or group cooperation would be related to communion. It is perceived that individual with the unmitigated agency would tend to isolate themselves from others, while unmitigated communion would exclude themselves for others. From the gender perspectives, it is claimed that males would tend to be 'agentic' than females. The existence of sex variance in communal and agentic could trigger conflicts between male and female. For instance, a majority of females complained that they could not communicate their inner feelings with their partners, while most of the males complained that their partners are too emotional. Moreover, males are associated with unmitigated agency whereas females would tend to be associated with unmitigated communion. Therefore, males would more likely to be related to dominant acts which means males would prefer to control tasks individually. This can be reflected that males would tend to be more individualistic than females. Unlike males, female is reported to have higher chance of developing unmitigated communion. Hence, it is probable that females are correlated with submissive acts. This shows that females would tend to apologise repeatedly. In addition, as females are likely to score high in unmitigated communion, thus females are more likely to be involved in relationship as well as socialise more than males.

=== General psychological distress ===
Psychological distress is correlated with unmitigated communion as this relates to a couple of interpersonal behaviours which include over-involvement with others as well as self-neglect. The psychological distress would cover anxiety and depression as the symptoms. The psychological distress might occur in college students, adolescents, and even adults. Unlike in unmitigated communion, people with high communion would not have a risk of psychological distress such as anxiety and depression. An additional factor of how unmitigated communion is related to psychological distress would be the absence of self-worth. This is because the absence of self-worth or self-esteem would be related to the depression and anxiety. A study also reported that one of the main reasons for a high level of unmitigated communion would be negative-self view.

=== Situation-specific distress ===
The over-involvement in other's problems would result in even further psychological distress, called situation-specific distress. This eventuates as individuals with high unmitigated communion would tend to involve in as well as take care of others' problems, they would be more likely to gain exposure toward a particular stressful moment or event. Hence, it is probable that they become distressed. Additionally, a study from Carnegie Mellon University showed that unmitigated communion is affected by events other people experienced. Unmitigated communion is also correlated with intrusive thoughts. For example, when a friend or family are in a trouble people with high unmitigated communion are very likely to think repeatedly and focus on their problem which in turn could lead people with unmitigated communion to feel guilty for not helping them as they always think that it is their responsibility to help their family or friend. Therefore, an individual with high unmitigated communion would tend to be vulnerable toward a situation specific distress that would result from the existence of other people's problems. The form of distress or suffering in situation specific distress would be greater compared to the generalised distress.

== Implication and relation to other factors ==
=== Relation to physical health ===
Physical health can be impacted from the psychological distress. As person with high unmitigated communion would tend to involve in others' problems. Therefore, when they are not able to meet the others' need and problem is not solved, a person with high unmitigated communion would tend to suffer from variety of illnesses such as heart disease or diabetes. For instance, the stress and depression from failure in meeting other people's need would lead individuals with high unmitigated communion have poor metabolic control such as poor control over blood glucose levels which could eventually result in diabetes. In addition, the anxiety and depression that is caused by the unmitigated communion could lead humans to suffer from chronic diseases or illness such as cardiac diseases as well as breast cancer, and are more likely to attack women.

=== Relation to disturbed eating disorder in adolescents ===
Eating disorder is correlated with unmitigated communion, especially in teenagers or adolescents. One reason of how both unmitigated communion and eating disorder are linked is because unmitigated communion could lead to low self-esteem. Hence, the adolescent would be pressured to look more fit and skinny in front of their peers. During adolescence, individuals with high unmitigated communion would tend to have overly other-focused behaviour; thus self-image from other people's perspective is tremendously essential. As people with high unmitigated communion overly focus on others and how others view them, hence when they do not meet the criteria of being fit and skinny from the perspective of the peers, this would trigger bulimic symptoms such as feeling insecure of own body.

=== Relation to economic costs in distributive and integrative bargaining ===
Unmitigated communion is related to the economic cost in distributive and integrative bargaining. This is because unmitigated communion might apply in the business environment during business negotiations as it involves self-concern and relationship. The objective of distributive bargaining is to gain a big portion of a certain pie of value, whereas the goal of integrative bargaining is to increase the size of the pie. In order to understand the consequence of unmitigated communion in negotiation, two conflict situations including distributive as well as integrative ones should be distinguished. While distributive conflict is represented by a few simple issues that occur during negotiation, integrative conflict is the issue that occurs in a complex business relationship.

From the perspective of distributive bargaining the consequences of unmitigated communion are not as complex, as integrative bargaining individuals with high unmitigated communion would be more likely to agree on low monetary outcomes during business negotiations. Besides, joint gains cannot be maximised in the integrative negotiation as the negotiator is hindered by relationship matter of unmitigated communion.

== See also ==
- Altruism vs. Egoism
- Collectivism vs. Individualism
- Hierarchical structure of the Big Five § Alpha and beta
- Interpersonal circumplex
- Reminiscence bump § Agentic vs. communion
