= Kannan =

Tamil name and epithet of the deity Krishna

Kannan கண்ணன் കണ്ണൻ
- Pronunciation: Kaṇṇaṉ
- Gender: Male
- Language: Tamil, Malayalam

Origin
- Region of origin: Southern India; North-eastern Sri Lanka

Other names
- Variant form: Kanna
- Derived: Krishna

Kannan (Tamil: கண்ணன்) (Malayalam: കണ്ണൻ) is a Tamil and Malayalam male given name. Due to a Tamil tradition of using patronymic surnames, it may also be a surname for males and females. The name is derived from the Hindu god Krishna, who is offered the epithet of Kannan in Tamil, meaning, "the one who is to be seen".

== Etymology ==
The word Kannan might come from the Pali into Tamil during the classical period. In Pali, Kanha means dark or black, and the Sanskrit equivalent will be Kṛṣṇa (Krishna). In Tamil-speaking regions, Lord Krishna is called as Kanna(or with a masculine ending Kannan).

== Notable people ==
=== Given name ===
- B. Kannan, Indian cinematographer
- K. Kannan, Singaporean footballer
- Kannan (music director), Indian film music composer
- Kannan Balakrishnan (born 1964), Indian musician
- Kannan Iyer, Indian film writer and actor
- Kannan Soundararajan, Indian mathematician
- M. Kannan, Indian politician
- P. Kannan, Indian politician from Tamil Nadu
- R. Kannan (born 1975), Indian film director
- S. P. Kannan, Indian politician
- Srirangam Kannan (born 1952), Indian musician
- Vedham Puthithu Kannan, Indian filmmaker
- Kannan Srinivasan, Indian-American politician in Virginia

=== Last Name ===
- Biju C. Kannan, Indian film director
- Beena Kannan (born 1960), Indian businesswoman
- Bharathi Kannan (born 1962), Indian film director
- Embar Kannan (born 1975), Indian musician
- Kanal Kannan, Indian film choreographer
- Ravi Kannan R Indian oncologist and Padma Shri awardee
- Ravindran Kannan (born 1953), Indian computer scientist
- Siddharth Kannan, Indian broadcaster
- Yaar Kannan, Indian film director

== Other uses ==
=== Films ===
- Kannan En Kadhalan, 1968 Tamil film
- Kannan Varuvaan, 2000 Tamil film

=== Places ===
- Kannan Devan Hills, village in Kerala, India

== See also ==
- Kanna
