= Bakan, Iran =

Bakan or Bakon (Persian: بكان or باكان) may refer to:

- Bakan, Fars (بكان - Bakān)
- Bakan Rural District, in Fars Province
