= The Seattle School of Theology & Psychology =

Graduate school in Seattle, Washington, U.S.

Coordinates: 47°36′48″N 122°21′03″W

- Former name: Mars Hill Graduate School
- Motto: Text. Soul. Culture.
- Type: Private graduate school
- Established: 1997
- President: J. Derek McNeil
- Dean: Misty Anne Winneried
- Students: ~300
- Location: Seattle, Washington, United States
- Campus: Urban Area
- Website: theseattleschool.edu

The Seattle School of Theology & Psychology is a private graduate school in Seattle, Washington.

== History ==
The Seattle School of Theology & Psychology was initially established under the auspices of Western Seminary in 1997, becoming independent in 2000, and establishing itself in downtown Seattle in 2007. In 2011, the school changed its name from Mars Hill Graduate School to The Seattle School of Theology & Psychology.

== Theology ==
The Seattle School is a progressive, interdisciplinary, multi-denominational institution. The Seattle School calls itself "a learning community informed by incarnational theology and a relational hermeneutic".

== Academics ==
The school offers four Master of Arts in Theology & Culture degree programs and one Master of Arts in Counseling Psychology degree. It also offers credit-bearing certificate programs, including some offered through the graduate school in theological studies, and others offered through The Allender Center that offers non-credit certificates, workshops, classes, and conferences on healing from trauma and abuse.

The Seattle School of Theology & Psychology is accredited by the Northwest Commission on Colleges and Universities. Additionally, the school is accredited by the Association of Theological Schools in the United States and Canada (ATS).

== Notable faculty ==
- Dan Allender

== See also ==
- Postcolonialism
- Postmodern Christianity
- Queer theology
