= Phnum Kravanh district =

Phnum Kravanh ស្រុកភ្នំក្រវាញ
- District (srok)
- Location in Cambodia
- Coordinates: 12°20′N 103°45′E
- Country: Cambodia
- Province: Pursat
- Communes: 7
- Villages: 55

Population (1998)
  - Total: 54,136
- Time zone: +7
- Geocode: 1504

Phnum Kravanh district (Khmer: ស្រុកភ្នំក្រវាញ) is a district in Pursat province, Cambodia. In English the name translates to the Cardamom Mountains.

== Location ==
Phnum Kravanh shares a border with Veal Veang district to the west and Koh Kong, Kampong Speu and Kampong Chhnang provinces to the south. Bakan and Sampov Meas districts are to the north and Krakor district is on the north eastern boundary. Previously Phnum Kravanh was much larger and stretched to the Thai border. However, in 1997 the western part of the district was taken to form the new district of Veal Veang. Area about 2900–3400 km^{2}.

The southern part of the district is largely unpopulated and has few roads. It forms a major part of the Central Cardamom range. According to the 1998 Census, Phnum Kravanh district is made up of 7 communes and 55 villages. The population of the district was 54,136 in 10,390 households at the time of the census.

== Characteristics ==
The district is large and sparsely populated with a population density of only around 15 person per square kilometre. Most of the district is forested, mountainous and some parts are still heavily mined particularly around Pteah Rung commune near the district capital.

Phnum Kravanh is also home to around 130 families of the few remaining ethnic minority Pear people. These families originally lived in the highlands of the Cardamom Mountains but were forced to move to the lowlands beside the Pursat River during the years of the Khmer Rouge regime.
