= Kanaa =

Kanaa may refer to:

- Kanaa (film), a 2018 Indian Tamil-language film
- Kanaa (TV series), a 2022 Indian Tamil-language drama series
- Kənəə, a village in the Ismailli Rayon of Azerbaijan

== See also ==
- Kana (disambiguation)
