= Hasanabad, Eqlid =

City in Fars province, Iran

Hasanabad Persian: حسن اباد
- City
- Location within Iran
- Coordinates: 30°31′14″N 52°27′18″E
- Country: Iran
- Province: Fars
- County: Eqlid
- District: Hasanabad

Population (2016)
  - Total: 2,045
- Time zone: UTC+3:30 (IRST)

Hasanabad (Persian: حسن اباد) (Note: Also romanized as Ḩasanābād) is a city in, and the capital of Hasanabad District of Eqlid County, Fars province, Iran. It also serves as the administrative center for Hasanabad Rural District.

== Demographics ==
=== Population ===
At the time of the 2006 National Census, Hasanabad's population was 1,921 in 377 households, when it was a village in Hasanabad Rural District. The following census in 2011 counted 1,894 people in 484 households, by which time the village had been elevated to the status of a city. The 2016 census measured the population of the city as 2,045 people in 582 households.
