= Dan Allender =

Christian therapist

Dan B. Allender is an American Christian therapist, author, and professor focusing on sexual abuse and trauma recovery, as well as story, marriage and family, and Christian Sabbath. Allender received his Master of Divinity from Westminster Theological Seminary and his PhD in Counseling Psychology from Michigan State University. He has taught at Grace Theological Seminary (1983-1989), Colorado Christian University (1989-1997), and The Seattle School of Theology and Psychology (where he teaches as of 2020).

Allender was one of the founders of The Seattle School of Theology & Psychology, in Seattle, Washington. He served as the President of The Seattle School from 2002 to 2009. He continues to serve as Professor of Counseling Psychology. He is a therapist in private practice. Allender's focus is on sexual abuse and trauma, as well as recovery through story. He also writes about and speaks to the impact of abuse on relationship, marriage and family, and the Christian Sabbath.

Allender is the author of To Be Told: Know Your Story, Shape Your Future, How Children Raise Parents, and The Healing Path, as well as The Wounded Heart, Bold Love, Intimate Allies, and God Loves Sex.

== The Allender Center ==
In 2010, The Allender Center was launched as a non-profit organization within The Seattle School of Theology and Psychology dedicated to the training of counseling professionals working in the areas of trauma and abuse. The Allender Center is responsible for Allender's conferences as well as certificate programs for professional development. The development options include online courses, conferences, workshops, trainings, and marriage retreats. Through the Allender Center, he hosts The Allender Center podcast with Rachel Clinton Chen. The weekly episodes invite voices to speak to the complexities of the human experience.

== Selected publications ==
- —— (1990). The wounded heart. Colorado Springs, CO: NavPress. ISBN 978-0-89109-289-6.
- ——; Longman, Tremper (1992). Bold love. Colorado Springs, CO: NavPress. ISBN 978-0-89109-679-5.
- ——; Longman, Tremper (1994). The cry of the soul: how our emotions reveal our deepest questions about God. Colorado Springs, CO: NavPress. ISBN 978-0-89109-827-0.
- ——; Longman, Tremper (1995). Intimate allies. Wheaton, IL: Tyndale House Publishers. ISBN 978-0-8423-1802-0.
- —— (1999). The healing path: how the hurts in your past can lead you to a more abundant life (1st ed.). Colorado Springs, CO: WaterBrook Press. ISBN 978-1-57856-109-4.
- —— (2003). How children raise parents: the art of listening to your family (1st ed.). Colorado Springs, CO: Waterbrook Press. ISBN 978-1-57856-110-0.
- —— (2006). Leading with a limp: turning your struggles into strengths (1st ed.). Colorado Springs, CO: Waterbrook Press. ISBN 978-1-57856-950-2. OCLC 63692589.
- —— (2006). To be told : God invites you to coauthor your future. Colorado Springs, CO: Waterbrook Press. ISBN 9781578569519.
- ——; Longman, Tremper (2007). Breaking the idols of your heart: how to navigate the temptations of life. Downers Grove, IL: InterVarsity Press. ISBN 978-0-8308-3441-9. OCLC 86117640.
- —— (2009). Sabbath. The ancient practices series. Nashville, TN: Thomas Nelson. ISBN 978-0-8499-0107-2. OCLC 244414709.
- ——; Longman, Tremper (2014). God loves sex: an honest conversation about sexual desire and holiness. Grand Rapids, MI: Baker Books, a division of Baker Publishing Group. ISBN 978-0-8010-1566-3.
- —— (2016). Healing the wounded heart: the heartache of sexual abuse and the hope of transformation. Grand Rapids, Michigan: Baker Books, a division of the Baker Publishing Group. ISBN 978-0-8010-1568-7.
- ——; Loerzel, Cathy (2021). Redeeming heartache: how past suffering reveals our true calling. Grand Rapids, Michigan: Zondervan. ISBN 978-0-310-36201-2.
