= KANA =

Radio station in Anaconda, Montana, United States

- Anaconda, Montana; United States
- Frequency: 580 kHz

Ownership
- Owner: Ted Austin; (Southwest Montana Media LLC)

History
- First air date: October 24, 1946
- Last air date: August 21, 2023
- Call sign meaning: Anaconda

Technical information
- Facility ID: 668
- Class: D
- Power: 1,000 watts (day); 197 watts (night)
- Transmitter coordinates: 46°7′43″N 112°55′25″W
- Translator: 100.7 K264CZ (Butte)

KANA (580 AM) was a radio station licensed to serve Anaconda, Montana, United States. The station was owned by Ted Austin, through licensee Southwest Montana Media LLC. It aired a classic hits music format. The station's transmitter site was off Landfill Road in Anaconda, Montana.

The station was assigned the KANA call sign by the Federal Communications Commission.

== Ownership ==
In December 2006, a deal was reached for KANA to be acquired by Butte Broadcasting, Inc. (Ronald Davis, president/general manager) from Jim Ray Carroll as part of a three-station deal with a total reported sale price of $500,000.

Butte Broadcasting donated KANA to A.W.A.R.E., Inc., a non-profit corporation, effective August 3, 2012.

Effective October 25, 2018, A.W.A.R.E., Inc. sold KANA to Ted Austin's Southwest Montana Media LLC for $25,000.

On August 21, 2023, Southwest Montana Media surrendered the licenses for KANA and translator K264CZ to the Federal Communications Commission (FCC), who cancelled them the same day. Unpaid regulatory fees attributed to KANA were a factor in the September 2026 revocation of the license for another Southwest Montana Media station, KBOQ (100.9 FM) in Lima.
