= Dordaneh, Kazerun =

Dordaneh دردانه
- Village
- Location within Iran
- Coordinates: 29°28′52″N 51°59′10″E
- Country: Iran
- Province: Fars
- County: Kazerun
- Bakhsh: Kuhmareh
- Rural District: Dasht-e Barm

Population (2006)
  - Total: 158
- Time zone: UTC+3:30 (IRST)
  - Summer (DST): UTC+4:30 (IRDT)

Dordaneh (Persian: دردانه, also Romanized as Dordāneh) is a village in Dasht-e Barm Rural District, Kuhmareh District, Kazerun County, Fars province, Iran. At the 2006 census, its population was 158, in 34 families.
