= Kanna (given name) =

- Gender: Female

Origin
- Origin: Japanese
- Meaning: Different meanings depending on the kanji used

Kanna is a feminine Japanese given name.

== Written forms ==
Forms in kanji can include:

- 栞菜, "bookmark, greens"
- 環奈, "circle, Nara"
- 寛那, "tolerant, what"
- 神奈, "God, Nara"
- 神無, "God, nothing"
- 栞奈, "bookmark, Nara"
- 佳采, "good, applause"

The name can also be written in hiragana or katakana.

== People ==
- Kanna (カンナ), guitarist and vocalist from the rock band Bleach03
- Kanna Arihara (有原 栞菜; born 1993), Japanese pop singer and former member of Cute
- Kanna Asakura (浅倉 栞南; born 1997), Japanese mixed martial artist
- Kanna Hashimoto (橋本 環奈; born 1999), Japanese idol singer
- Kanna Hayashi (born 1999), Japanese health scientist and an associate professor
- Kanna Hirayama (平山 寛菜; born 1995), Japanese animator, illustrator, and character designer
- Kanna Masuda (増田 寛那; born 1989), Japanese team handball player
- Kanna Mori (森 カンナ; born 1988), Japanese fashion model and actress
- Kanna Nakamura (中村 カンナ), Japanese voice actress
- Kanna Suzuki (鈴木 環那; born 1987), Japanese shogi player

== Fictional characters ==
- Kannabi no Mikoto "Kanna" (神奈), a character in the visual novel Air
- Kanna, a character in the television series Avatar: The Last Airbender
- Kanna (カンナ), a character in the video game Fire Emblem Fates
- Kanna (神無), a character in the manga series Inuyasha
- Kanna (カンナ) or Lorelei (Pokémon), a character in the Pokémon franchise
- Kanna Bismarch (カンナ), a character in the manga series Shaman King
- Kanna Endō (カンナ), a character in the manga series 20th Century Boys
- Kanna Hase (栞奈), a character in the light novel series The Pet Girl of Sakurasou
- Kanna Kamui (カンナカムイ), a character in the manga series Miss Kobayashi's Dragon Maid
- Kanna Kirishima (カンナ), a character in the Sakura Wars franchise
- Kanna Makino (かんな), a character in the anime series Tamako Market
- Kanna, a character class of the "Sengoku" type in the video game "MapleStory"
- Kanna, an oni from Dead or Alive Xtreme Venus Vacation
- Kanna Kizuchi, a character from the video game Your Turn to Die -Death Game by Majority-

== See also ==
- Kana (given name)
