= Abigail Bakan =

Canadian political writer

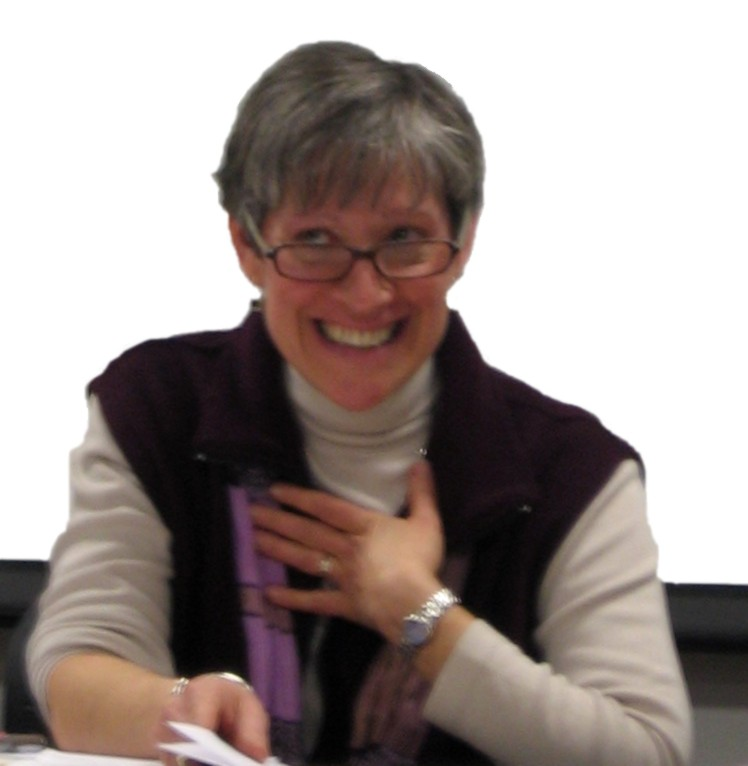
Bakan at a public debate

Abigail B. Bakan (born 1954) is a Canadian academic.

== Academic career ==
Bakan was chair of the Department of Humanities, Social Sciences and Social Justice Education at the Ontario Institute for Studies in Education of the University of Toronto from 2013 to 2018 and after the end of her term remains a professor in the department. Her research focuses on employment equity, Marxist theory and "anti-oppression politics".

From 1998 to 2013, she was professor of Political Studies at Queen's University, Kingston, Ontario, Canada after being an associate and then assistant professor at the university from 1985 until 1998. From 2011 to 2013 she served as head of the Department of Gender Studies at Queen's.

Bakan was educated at York University,

== Views on Israel/Palestine ==
In a protest held in Toronto on July 29, 2006, Bakan criticized the government of Prime Minister Stephen Harper for supporting "Israel's illegal action against the Lebanese and Palestinian people." In a debate held at York University on May 11, 2009, Bakan and Ryerson University professor Alan Sears spoke in support of a boycott of Israeli academic institutions.

== Books ==
Bakan has written and edited several books, including:

- Negotiating Citizenship: Migrant Women in Canada and the Global System, co-authored with Daiva Stasiulis, University of Toronto Press, 2005.
- Critical Political Studies: Debates and Dialogues from the Left, co-edited with Eleanor MacDonald, McGill-Queen's University Press, 2003, ISBN 0-7735-2252-2
- Not One of the Family: Foreign Domestic Workers in Canada, co-edited with Daiva Stasiulis, University of Toronto Press, 1997, ISBN 0-8020-7595-9
- Imperial Power and Regional Trade: The Caribbean Basin Initiative, co-edited with David Cox and Colin Leys, Wilfrid Laurier University Press, 1993, ISBN 0-88920-220-6
- Ideology and Class Conflict in Jamaica: The Politics of Rebellion, McGill-Queen's University Press, 1990, ISBN 0-7735-0745-0

== Family ==
Bakan is the daughter of psychologist and academic David Bakan and philosopher and academic Mildred Bakan. She is the cousin of law professor Joel Bakan and ethnomusicologist Michael Bakan.
