= Pursat province =

Province of Cambodia

Pursat Province ខេត្តពោធិ៍សាត់
- Province

Khmer transcription(s)
  - Khmer: ខេត្តពោធិ៍សាត់
  - UNGEGN: Khaet Po Săt
  - ALA-LC: Khett Bo Sát
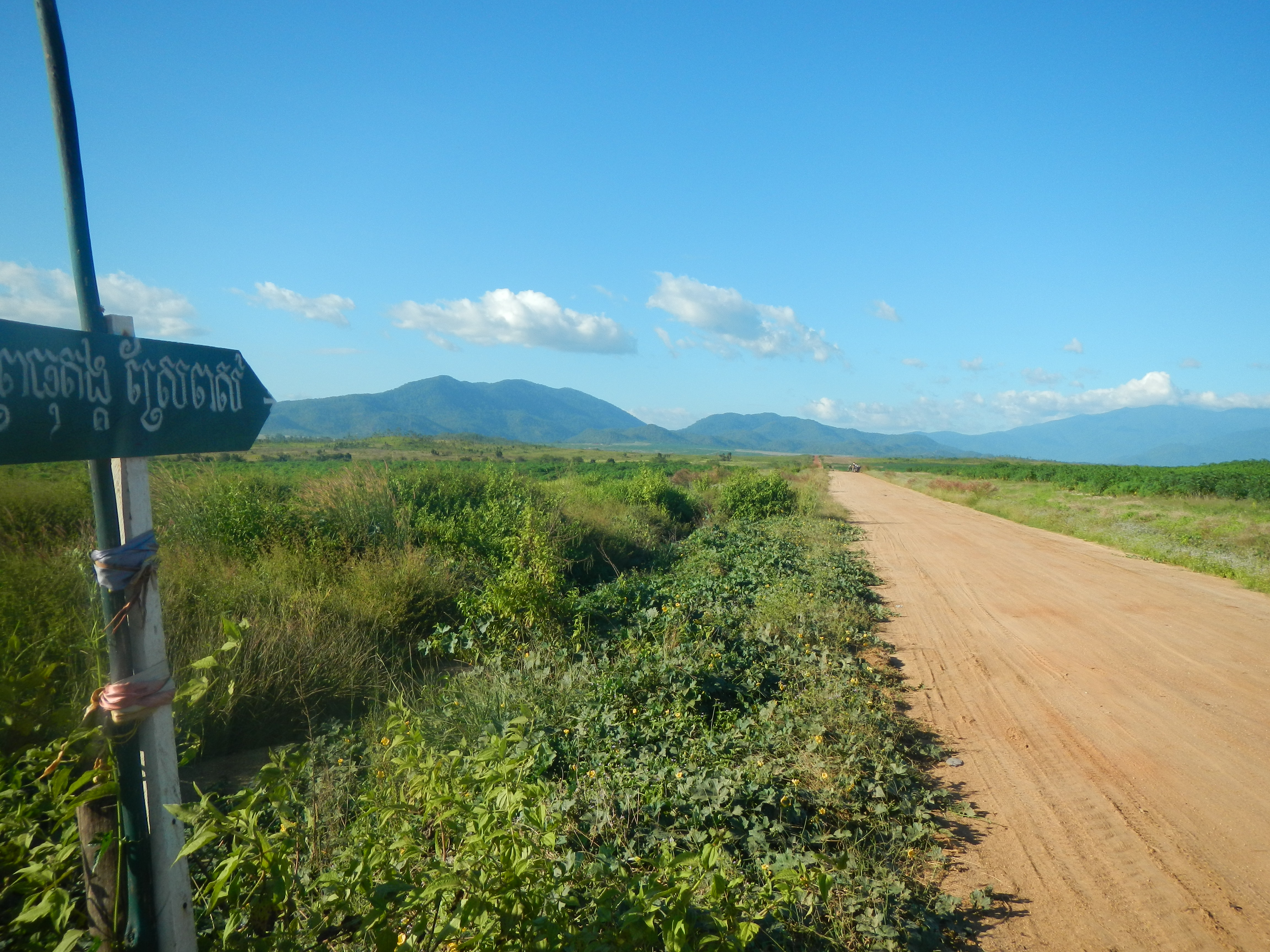
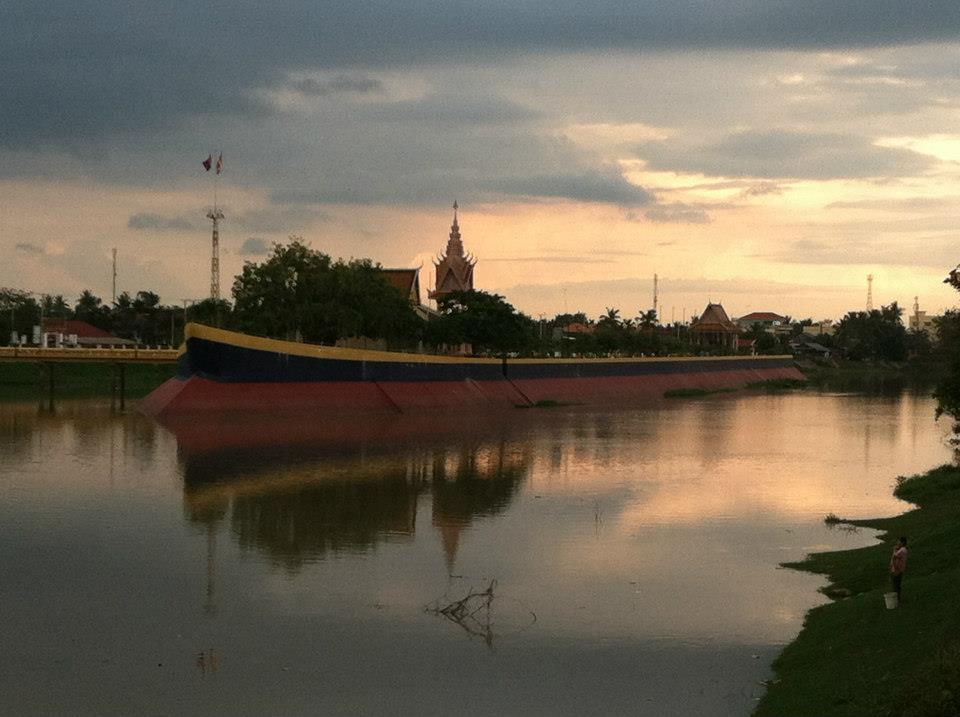
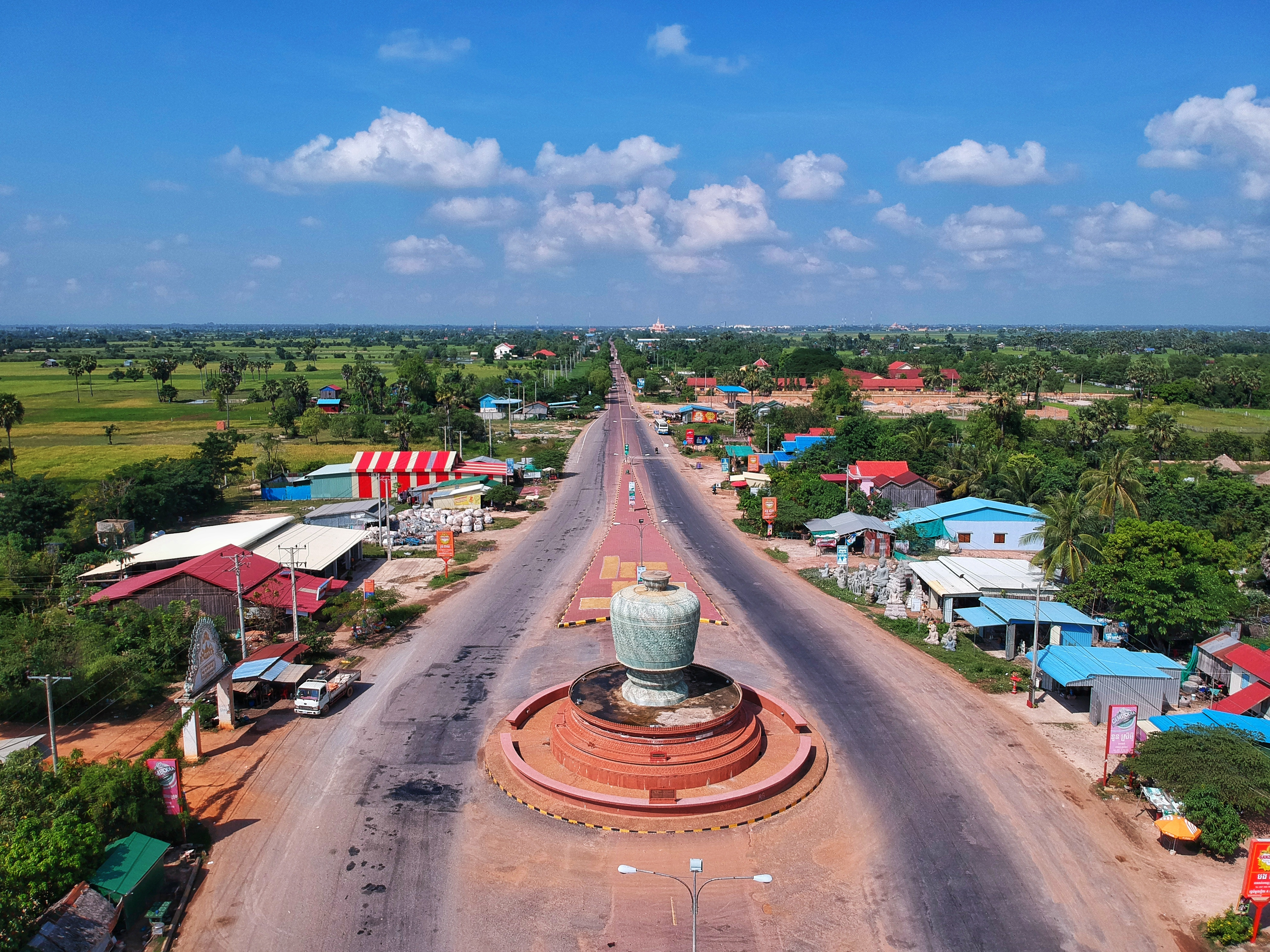

- Seal

- Map of Cambodia highlighting Pursat
- Coordinates: 12°32′N 103°55′E
- Country: Cambodia
- Provincial status: 1907
- Capital: Pursat

Government
  - Governor: Khoy Rida (CPP)
  - National Assembly: 4 / 125

Area
  - Total: 12,692 km^{2} (4,900 sq mi)
  - Rank: 4th

Population (2024)
  - Total: ▲516,071
  - Rank: 15th
  - Density: 33/km^{2} (85/sq mi)
  - Rank: 20th
- Time zone: UTC+07:00 (ICT)
- Dialing code: +855
- ISO 3166 code: KH-15
- HDI (2017): 0.551 medium
- Website: pursat.gov.kh

Pursat Province (Khmer: ខេត្តពោធិ៍សាត់, Khaet Po Săt [poː sat]; lit. 'floating banyan') is a province of Cambodia. It is in the western part of the country and borders clockwise from the north: Battambang province, the Tonlé Sap, Kampong Chhnang province, Kampong Speu province, Koh Kong province, and East Thailand. It lies between the Tonle Sap and the northern end of the Cardamom Mountains. The Pursat River bisects the province, running from the Cardamoms in the west to the Tonle Sap in the east.

The fourth largest province of Cambodia in area, Pursat ranks only 14th in population. The region is accessible by National Highway 5, by boat, rail and by numerous smaller roads. The capital, Pursat town, lies 174 kilometres north west of capital Phnom Penh by road and 106 kilometres south east of Battambang.

Pursat is home to Wat Bakan, considered to be among the oldest active pagodas in Cambodia and revered as one of the most holy sites of Cambodian Buddhism. The province also hosts the annual River Run Race, an event that includes 5 km and 10 km races that generally follow the path of the Pursat River for men and women, including those requiring wheelchairs. Since its inaugural race in 2007, the event has grown to the second largest of its kind in Cambodia

== Geography ==
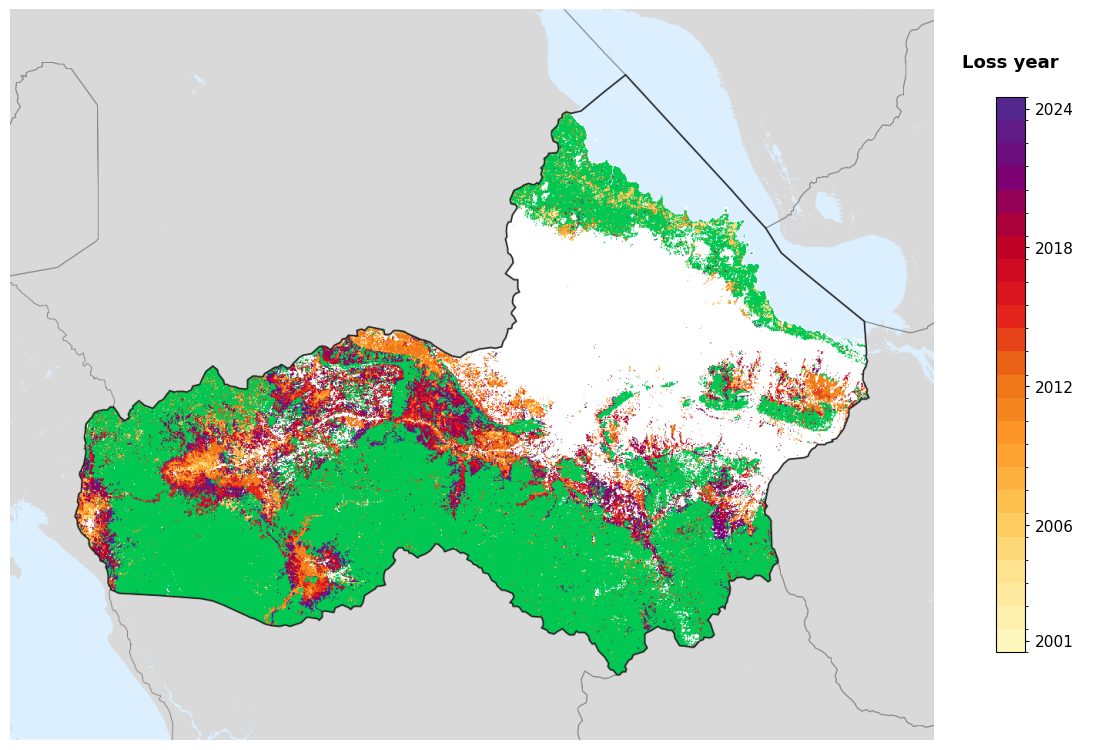
Tree-cover loss year in Pursat, 2001-2024, from the Global Forest Change dataset.

The physical geography of Pursat encompasses many bioregions ranging from densely forested mountains to fertile plains to the Tonle Sap basin. Forests cover approximately 58% of Pursat. The mountains of the Cardamom range rise high in the west and southwest of the province along the border with Thailand and the coast. By the early 2010s, programme activities in the Cardamom Mountains portions of Pursat Province included forest and biodiversity protection, land-use planning and rural livelihood work supported by Conservation International’s Cambodia programme. Parts of the province were designated as Central Cardamom Mountains National Park in 2016. The land slopes toward the northeast, opening into the plains that continue into Battambang and from which much of Cambodia's rice crop is harvested. The Pursat River follows this orientation and drains into the Tonle Sap which forms Pursat's eastern boundary. Pursat is one of the nine provinces that are part of the Tonle Sap Biosphere Reserve.

== Economy ==
=== Thmada ===
Chinese investors have disbursed close to 10 billion baht to develop a new city in Thmada, a border village in Veal Veang District in the province. The new town is to be built in five phases, and about 80% of the first phase, 1,000 condominiums, has been built as of 2019, together with a luxury hotel, restaurants, casinos, and other businesses. The project is to be completed by 2022 or 2025.

=== Agarwood ===
Due to the geography and climate of Pursat, Aquilaria thrives in its forest. Aquilaria species, specifically Aquilaria crassna, infected with the parasitic mold Phaeoacremonium parasitica are the source of agarwood. There was an abundance in wild agarwood in the past. Due to its distinct fragrance, the trees were sought after and felled for gift offerings to the royal family and officials.

Agarwood harvested from Pursat was the most valuable and highly in demand. In the early-1970s, "oud Cambodi" was the most sought after oud oil on the market because of the belief that it contains a psychoactive substance that affects the mind and emotions.

The depletion of wild trees from rampant cutting of agarwood has resulted in the trees being listed and protected as an endangered species. Projects are being implemented to infect cultivated Aquilaria trees artificially, to produce agarwood in a sustainable manner.

In 2015, Lieutenant General Ouk Kosa of Cambodia's Ministry of National Defense signed an MOU with a Singaporean company, giving the company access to six million mature Aquilaria trees, which they will inoculate to produce agarwood.

== Administrative divisions ==
The province is divided into six districts and one municipality, further divided into 51 communes.

ISO code	District	Khmer
15-01	Bakan	ស្រុកបាកាន
15-02	Kandieng	ស្រុកកណ្តៀង
15-03	Krakor	ស្រុកក្រគរ
15-04	Phnum Kravanh	ស្រុកភ្នំក្រវាញ
15-05	Pursat Municipality (formerly Sampov Meas)	ក្រុងពោធិ៍សាត់ (អតីត ស្រុកសំពៅមាស)
15-06	Veal Veang	ស្រុកវាលវែង
15-07	Talou Senchey	ស្រុកតាលោសែនជ័យ
