= Daniel A. Helminiak =

American priest & author (born 1942)

Daniel A. Helminiak (born November 20, 1942, in Pittsburgh, Pennsylvania) is a retired Catholic priest, theologian and author in the United States. He is most widely known for his international best-seller What the Bible Really Says about Homosexuality.

He was a professor in the Department of Humanistic and Transpersonal Psychology at the University of West Georgia in Carrollton, Georgia. There from 1995 to 1997 and 2000 until early 2018, he regularly taught Human Sexuality, Statistics for the Social Sciences, Foundations of Neuroscience, and Animal Mind. On the graduate level he has taught courses related to the psychology of spirituality, which is his specialization and the focus of his research, lecturing, and writing.

== Early life and education ==
Helminiak was born (1942) and raised in a Polish Catholic community on the south side of Pittsburgh, Pennsylvania. He frequently refers to this experience in his popular writings on spirituality and community. He attended parochial grade and high schools and at age seventeen entered seminary to study for the priesthood at Our Lady of the Lake Seminary, Syracuse, IN, and St. Vincent Seminary, Latrobe, PA, where he was awarded a BA in philosophy (1964). He completed graduate studies at the Pontifical Gregorian University in Rome, earning an STB (1966) and an STL (1968), Bachelor and License in Sacred Theology, and was ordained there at the pope's parish church, St. John Lateran Basilica (1967).

He served as associate pastor of SS. Simon and Jude Church in Scott Township (Pittsburgh) for four years and subsequently pursued an educational ministry, serving as junior faculty-member at St. Mary Seminary, Baltimore, MD (1972–1973) and completing a PhD in systematic theology in the Joint Doctoral Program of Boston College and Andover Newton Theological School (1979). He then served as assistant professor of systematic theology and spirituality at Oblate School of Theology in San Antonio (1981–1985), completing an MA in personality theory at Boston University (1983) with a thesis that became Part I of his book Spiritual Development, and earning a second PhD in human development at The University of Texas at Austin (1994). On weekends throughout these years, Helminiak ministered in local parishes in Baltimore, Boston, San Antonio, and Austin and, having come out as gay in 1976, also served in those areas and nationally as chaplain to DignityUSA, an LGBT Catholic support network.

== Career and work ==
In 1995, Helminiak accepted a teaching position at the University of West Georgia (then, West Georgia College), where he has remained except for advanced training in counseling at Pittsburgh Pastoral Institute. Helminiak was elected a Fellow of the American Psychological Association, was certified as a Fellow of the American Association of Pastoral Counselors, and is licensed as a Professional Counselor (LPC) in the state of Georgia. Also in 1995, Helminiak submitted to the Vatican a formal resignation from active ministry although he remains a priest according to Catholic teaching: "Once a priest, always a priest." As is not uncommon, the Vatican never responded to his resignation, which fact he takes jokingly to mean that the Vatican is allowing him to continue to speak for the Catholic Church.

From 1975 to 1978 at Boston College, Helminiak served as teaching assistant to Prof. Bernard J. F. Lonergan, SJ (1904–1984), the philosopher, theologian, economist, and methodologist whom Newsweek styled the Thomas Aquinas of the twentieth century. Lonergan is reputed to have integrated classical philosophy with contemporary science and, in the process, to have resolved the Kantian problem of knowing the "thing in itself." Building on the thought of giants of the Western Tradition—such as Aristotle, Augustine, Aquinas, Kant, Hegel, Newman, Einstein, Hilbert, Gödel, Heisenberg—Lonergan portrays the human mind as a self-transcending, normatively structured, self-correcting dynamism geared to the universe of "being," all that there is to be known and loved. He refers to this dimension of the mind as intentional consciousness and frequently also as the human spirit.

Taking Lonergan seriously, Helminiak used his analysis of consciousness or human spirit to develop a theory of spirituality that is grounded in humanity and only subsequently and optionally, although naturally, opens onto questions of God and human relationship and possible union with God. This humanistic emphasis is the uniqueness of Helminiak's psychology of spirituality, which claims to depict the spiritual core that runs through all religions and cultures. Helminiak's two-volume technical study, The Human Core of Spirituality and Religion and the Human Sciences, provides detailed elaboration of this theory. Brain, Consciousness, and God stands as an overall synthesis and grounded argument for this theory. In collaboration with Drs. Barnet D. Feingold (Veterans Administration, retired) and David Jenks (University of West Georgia) Helminiak is pursuing field research on this theory.

== Psychology and spirituality ==
Helminiak's psychology of spirituality offers a coherent Western alternative to prevalent understandings of spirituality based on Eastern philosophy. Whereas Jewish, Christian, and Muslim theologies see God most fundamentally as Creator and, perforce, see all else—including human consciousness or spirit—as created and, therefore, not divine, Eastern thought tends to obscure the distinction between the spiritual and the divine and holds that, "deep down inside" and purified of all earthly attachment, humanity really is divinity. Such is the intent of the Hindu axiom, "Atman is Brahman," and the Vedic lesson, "That thou art."

Western thinking insists that, although God is spiritual, all that is spiritual is not thereby God. Creator and creature, the Uncreated and the created, are defined by relationship to each other. By sheer dint of logic, the created cannot be or become the Uncreated; they cannot be one and the same. Moreover, the Uncreated cannot come in parts or degrees—for example, a supposed "spark of divinity" or a human status of "somewhat" or "still imperfectly" divine. Genesis 1:27 does allow that God created humankind in the divine "image and likeness," that is, in some way God-like: spiritual. As treated in detail in Spiritual Development (Part III) and Religion and the Human Sciences, Christianity elaborates this theme to explain the possibility of human deification: through the saving work of Jesus Christ and the gift of the Holy Spirit poured into human hearts (Romans 15:15), humankind can actually achieve the furthest possible fulfillment of the human spirit and come to share in certain qualities that are proper to God alone, for example, understanding of everything about everything, and universal love; but humankind cannot share in God's eternal, uncreated being.

Thus, both East and West conceive of human union with God but explain it in significantly different ways. These matters are subtle and difficult, and the technically precise distinctions might not always have immediate practical consequences. That is to say, the religions of the East and the West have served and, for the most part, continue to serve their adherents well. However, the unavoidable pluralism of twenty-first-century globalization demands that at some level a spiritual consensus be forged. This is the theme of Helminiak's Spirituality for Our Global Community. This enterprise calls for the precision of a science. Then the above named distinctions become crucial. Only an epistemology or philosophy of science adequate to spiritual reality could manage the subtleties—a main theme in Brain, Consciousness, and God. Many believe that Lonergan has finally provided the requisite epistemology, and Helminiak uses it both to differentiate the human and the divine within spirituality and to inter-relate them. That is, he inter-relates psychology, spirituality, and theology and thus presents a logically coherent and comprehensive understanding of spirituality. It requires no appeal to paradox as, for example, Ken Wilber adamantly does in his "perennial philosophy" and "Integral Studies." Helminiak's elaboration of the human core of spirituality becomes the lynchpin of the overall interdisciplinary, scientific project.

== What the Bible Really Says about Homosexuality ==
What the Bible Really Says about Homosexuality, first released in 1994 and published in a significantly up-dated "Millennium Edition" in 2000, is Helminiak's best known book. The book has sold over 100,000 copies and been translated into a number of languages. It popularizes recent scholarship that aims to understand biblical texts within their original historical and cultural settings.

The work argues that far from condemning, the Bible is essentially indifferent to same-sex relationships, as was most of the ancient world—that the prohibition of Leviticus 18:22, against "man lying with man as with a woman," pertains solely to anal penetration, not to other male-male sexual practices, and rests on concern about ancient Jewish ritual taboos ("purity"), not hygiene, idolatrous rituals, opposition to Gentile practices, or more recent ethical beliefs about the nature of sex or the complementarity of the sexes. According to Helminiak, the most important Christian text on same-sex behavior, Romans 1:26-27, refers back to Leviticus ("God gave them up to impurity," Romans 1:24) and, following Jesus, dismisses the purity requirements of the "Old Law" as irrelevant for Christians ("Nothing is unclean in itself," Romans 14:14). Helminiak also argues that the "unnatural" of Romans 1:26 is a mistranslation of Paul's popular usage of the otherwise technical Stoic Greek term para physin, which, without ethical implications, should read "atypical" or "non-standard."

== Books by Helminiak ==
- Brain, Consciousness, and God: A Lonerganian Integration (State University of New York Press, 2015, I978-1-4384-5716-1).
- Spirituality for Our Global Community: Beyond Traditional Religion to a World at Peace (Rowman & Littlefield, 2008, ISBN 978-0-7425-5917-2).
- The Transcended Christian: What Do You Do When You Outgrow Your Religion? (updated and expanded edition, 2013, self-published, available at amazon.com, ISBN 9781492850045; originally The Transcended Christian: Spiritual Lessons for the Twenty-first Century, Alyson Books, 2007, ISBN 155583-860-X).
- Sex and the Sacred: Gay Identity and Spiritual Growth (Haworth / Harrison Park, 2006, ISBN 1-56023-342-7). This integration of sexuality and spirituality uses homosexuality as the telling test case. It introduces a fully psychological / humanistic approach to spirituality and later addresses specific religious issues including sexual ethics, Fundamentalism, and Vatican teaching.
- Meditation without Myth: What I Wish They'd Taught Me in Church about Prayer, Meditation, and the Quest for Peace (Crossroad Publishing Co., 2005, ISBN 0-8245-2308-3). This is a popular three-part presentation of Helminiak's psychology of spirituality applied to the specific topic, meditation—practically, how to do it; psychologically, why it works; and religiously, what it means.
- What the Bible Really Says about Homosexuality (Alamo Square Press, 1994, 2000 ISBN 1-886360-09-X; now available on Kindle through amazon.com).
- Religion and the Human Sciences: An Approach via Spirituality (State University of New York Press, 1998, ISBN 0-7914-3806-6).
- The Human Core of Spirituality: Mind as Psyche and Spirit (State University of New York Press, 1996, ISBN cloth 0-7914-2949-0, paper 0-7914-2950-4).
- Spiritual Development: An Interdisciplinary Study (Loyola University Press, 1987, ISBN 0-8294-0530-5, out of print).
- The Same Jesus: A Contemporary Christology (Loyola University Press, 1986, ISBN 0-8294-0521-6, out of print).
