= Stephen Baker (animal behaviorist) =

Stephen Baker (April 17, 1921, Vienna, Austria-September 13, 2004, Manhattan, New York City) was an animal behaviorist, advertising executive, author and humorist of Austrian origin. He came with his mother and brothers Thomas and Peter from Hungary, April 2, 1940 aboard the S.S. Vulcanin from Italy. In December 1940 he made a Declaration of Intention to become a U.S. citizen at the District Court of Pottawatomie County, Shawnee, Oklahoma. He was a student at the Jewish Teachers Seminary, New York.

He had been born Stefan Bacher in Vienna, Baker, both artist and writer, created the "Let your fingers do the walking" ad campaign for the AT&T Yellow Pages as art director for the advertising agency Cunningham & Walsh.

Baker wrote 22 books on various topics, from "The Systematic Approach to Advertising Creativity" and "Advertising Layout and Art Direction," to "How to Look like Somebody in Business without Being Anybody," "How to Get a Job without Asking for It" and "I Hate Meetings."

"How to Live with a Neurotic Dog", published in 1960, sold more than 200,000 copies.

Other works include "How to Live with a Neurotic Cat" and "How to Play Golf in the Low 120's".
