= Anne Rooney =

British author

Anne Rooney is a British book author, primarily of non-fiction for children and young adults. Rooney has a bachelor's degree and Ph.D. from the University of Cambridge, and is also a tutor in the Cambridge Institute of Continuing Education. Her doctoral work and early books concerned medieval studies.

== Select bibliography ==
- The Tretyse off Huntyng (1987)
- Geoffrey Chaucer: A Guide Through the Critical Maze (1989)
- Hunting in Middle English Literature (1993)
- Is Our Climate Changing? (2008)
- Feeding the World (2009)
- Reducing the Carbon Footprint (2009)
- The Story of Mathematics (2009)
- Messages from Beyond (2009)
- Strange Places (2009)
- UFOs and Aliens (2009)
- The History of Medicine (2012)
- Great Scientists (2013)
- Great Mathematicians (2013)
- Aerospace Engineering and the Principles of Flight (2013)
- Audio Engineering and the Science of Sound Waves (2014)
- Optical Engineering and the Science of Light (2014)
- Dinosaur Atlas (2017)
