= A Defence of Masochism =

1998 non-fiction book on BDSM by Anita Phillips

- A Defence of Masochism cover art
- Author: Anita Phillips
- Cover artist: Zoe Leonard
- ISBN: 0-571-19697-7

A Defence of Masochism is a 1998 non-fiction book by Anita Phillips covering the topic of BDSM, which offers philosophical and sociological arguments for the virtues of masochism.

== See also ==
- Beauty calibrator (depicted in cover art)
