= Bakan district =

Bakan ស្រុកបាកាន
- District (srok)
- Location in Cambodia
- Coordinates: 12°36′N 103°47′E
- Country: Cambodia
- Province: Pursat
- Communes: 10
- Villages: 156

Population (1998)
  - Total: 121,229
- Time zone: +7
- Geocode: 1501

Bakan (Khmer: ស្រុកបាកាន) is a district in Pursat province, Cambodia. The district capital is at Trapeang Chong located on National Highway 5 around 15 kilometres north of the provincial capital at Pursat town.

According to the 1998 Census, Bakan is made up of 10 communes and 156 villages. The population of the district was 121,229 persons in 22,494 households at the time of the census. Bakan is the most populous district in Pursat province.

== Location ==
Bakan shares a border with Battambang province to the north and the district of Veal Veang to the west. To the south of Bakan are Phnum Kravanh and Sampov Meas districts. Bakan shares its eastern border with Kandieng district. To the northeast Bakan encompasses a portion of the Tonle Sap lake. Three villages in this part of the district are Tonle Sap floating villages. Their location moves depending on the water level in the lake.

== Administration ==
The following table shows the villages of Bakan district by commune.

Khum (communes)	Phum (villages)
Boeng Bat Kandal	Doung Chrum, Samraong, Tram Seh, Ou, Bat Trach, Robang Romeas, Bat Kandaol, Svay, Preah Ampil, Boeng Chhuk, Tuol Thmea, Svay Chrum, Ruessei Ta Man
Boeng Khnar	Prey Phdau, Boeng Khnar, Krasang Kruo, Rung, Voat Chreae, Preah Mlu, Prey Svay, Chamkar Leu, Prey Damrei, Khnach Romeas, Srakar, Daeum Chres, Trach Kraol
Khnar Totueng	Daeum Roka, Kaoh Svay, Kamprak Koun, Tuol Angkrong, Krouch Saeuch, Khnar Totueng, Boeng Chhuk, Phteah Sla, Kaoh Krabei, Damnak Thnong, Bak Meaek, Kaoh Voat
Me Tuek	Angkanh, Ou Preal, Cha Yov, Kdat, Paolao, Ta Mom, Chen Tay, Me Tuek, Kaoh Khsach, Ma, Dei Roneat, Trang, Samraong Prey Khiev, K'amsamna, Preaek Kra
Ou Ta Paong	Prey Yeang, Robaoh Reang, Chamkar Ou, Chamkar Khloy, Ou Ta Paong, Anlong Kray, Srah Mkak, Bat Kokir Chas, Sdok Khlouk, Tuol Rokeang, Samraong Pok, Phsar Andaet, Oknha Moan, Srah Run, Bat Kokir Thmei, Ta Nai, Ou Bat, Prey Krabau
Rumlech	Pnov, Roung Ta Kok, Koun Tnaot, Pralay Rumdeng, Prasat, Kampong Kdei, Rumlech, Kaoh Khcheay, Sdok Khla, Khvav, Damnak Trach, Lhong, Thmei
Snam Preah	Snam Preah, Krapeu Rou, Andoung Sambuor, Sameakki, Chambak Meas, Tuol Khmer, Sdok Svay, Kaoh Krasang, Pnov, Dangkieb Kdam, Anlong Mean, Kampeaeng Svay, Khmar, Thnuoh Ta Chab, Svay At, Araen, Andoung Krasang, Bak Pring, Cheung Phleung, Tram Peaer
Svay Doun Kaev	Tuol Samraong, Svay Doun Kaev Ti Muoy, Svay Doun Kaev Ti Pir, Svay Sa, Kampang, Chrab, Thmei, Kampout Ang, Nikom Leu
Trapeang Chorng	Bakan, Kab Kralanh, Poulyum, Stueng Kambot, Boeng Prei, Srae Lvea, Chamkar Ou, Kandoeng Meas, Trapeang Chorng, Kaoh Andaet, Kaoh Svay, Kraol Krabei, Pit Trang, Kaoh Kaev, Buo Srangae, Snay Toul, Ou Rumchek, Kdei Chhnuol, Thmei, Preah Chambak

== Characteristics ==
The national highway and the only north-south rail link in the country bisect the district and thus most villages have comparatively good access to goods and services. There is a district Hospital at Boeng Khnar and the provincial capital and higher level services are only a short distance away. There is an active market that spills over onto the highway at Trapeang Chong and this combined with the recent resurfacing of the highway has led to increased traffic accidents and road fatalities.

== Wat Bakan ==
Wat Bakan or Bakan Pagoda is one of the oldest active pagodas in the country. The Buddhist Institute of Cambodia notes that the original pagoda is over 800 years old and has been in continuous use as a temple. It is regarded as one of the holiest sites in Cambodian Buddhism. Parts of the original pagoda can still be seen around a small mound behind one of the buildings of the main temple. During the Khmer Rouge years many stones from the old temple were taken to build an embankment and repair bridges at Damnak Ampil nearby.
