= Wat Bakan =

Pagoda in Cambodia

Coordinates: 12°34′32″N 103°45′59″E

Wat Bakan (Khmer: វត្តបាកាន, Vôtt Bakan [ʋɔət ɓaːkaːn]) is a pagoda in Trapeang chorng commune, Bakan District of Pursat Province in Cambodia. It is one of the oldest active pagodas in the country, thought to be at least 800 years old.
