= Kana (surname) =

Kana or Káňa is a surname. Notable people include:

- André Kana-Biyik (born 1965), Cameroonian footballer
- Jan Káňa (ice hockey, born 1990), Czech ice hockey player
- Jan Káňa (ice hockey, born 1992), Czech ice hockey player
- Jean-Armel Kana-Biyik (born 1989), Cameroonian footballer
- Johan Kana (1882–1934), Estonian politician
- Marco Kana (born 2002), Belgian footballer
- Sébastien Ndzana Kana (born 1983), Cameroonian footballer
- Tomáš Káňa (born 1987), Czech ice hockey player
