= Pursat River =

Pursat River ស្ទឹងពោធិ៍សាត់
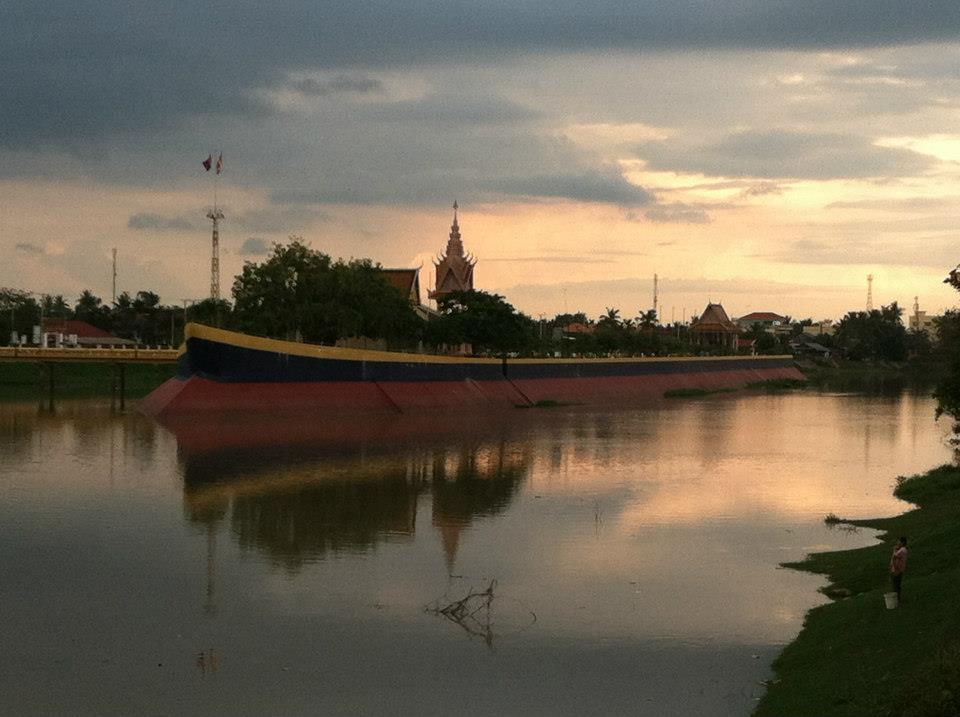
- Sampov Meas Island on the Pursat River

Location
- Country: Cambodia
- Province: Pursat Province

Physical characteristics
- Mouth
  - location: Tonle Sap

The Pursat River (Khmer: ស្ទឹងពោធិ៍សាត់, Steung Pursat) also known as Steung Tamyong is a major river of western Cambodia, It drains about two-thirds of the chain to the Tonlé Sap. Pursat and Tumpor lie along the river.
