= David Bakan =

American psychologist (1921–2004)

David Bakan (April 23, 1921 in New York City – October 18, 2004 in Toronto) was an American psychologist. He is the author of the book Freud and the Jewish Mystical Tradition.

== Career ==
David Bakan was a major influence in how the field of psychology implemented the use of statistics in research, particularly the statistical test of significance. Bakan was one of the earliest psychologists to promote the use of Bayesian statistics as an alternative to conventional statistical approaches, first publishing on the topic in 1953. He was one of the founders of the American Psychological Association's Division 26, the History of Psychology, and served as the president of the division in 1970–71.

After attending Brooklyn College from 1942 Bakan studied psychology at Indiana University. He received his PhD in 1948 at the Ohio State University, under the direction of Floyd Carlton Dockeray, in aviation psychology, a field of application of industrial psychology. Bakan held several university positions from 1961, teaching at the University of Chicago, Ohio State, Harvard, and York University in Toronto, Canada. Bakan wrote on a wide range of topics including psychoanalysis, religion, philosophy, and research methodology, as well as child abuse. In his book Sigmund Freud and the Jewish Mystical Tradition (1958), he attempted to trace the roots of early psychoanalytic theory and methods in the Kabbalah, the Zohar, and Talmudic interpretations. His Duality of Human Existence: An Essay on Psychology and Religion (1966) made important contributions to the history of psychology, especially in relation to the problem of introspection, research methodology, and the psychology of religion. In this book, he coined the psychological use of the terms "communion" and "agency".

Bakan retired in 1991 and served as professor emeritus in York University's Department of Psychology until his death in 2004.

== Selected bibliography ==
- Sigmund Freud and the Jewish Mystical Tradition (1958)
- Duality of Human Existence: An Essay on Psychology and Religion (1966)
- On Method: Toward a Reconstruction of Psychological Investigation (1967)
- Disease, Pain, and Sacrifice: Toward a Psychology of Suffering (1968)
- Slaughter of the Innocents: A Study of the Battered Child Phenomenon (1971)
- And They Took Themselves Wives: The Emergence of Patriarchy in Western Civilization (1979)
- Maimonides on Prophecy: A Commentary on Selected Chapters of the Guide of the Perplexed (1991)

== Personal life ==
David married Mildred ("Millie") Blynn, who became a professor of philosophy at York University, in 1948, and they had six children: Joseph, Deborah, Abigail, Jonathan, Daniel and Jacob. He retired in 1991, and died at Mount Sinai Hospital in Toronto at the age of 83.

== See also ==
- Unmitigated communion, first introduced by Bakan in 1966
