= Henryk Skolimowski =

Polish philosopher

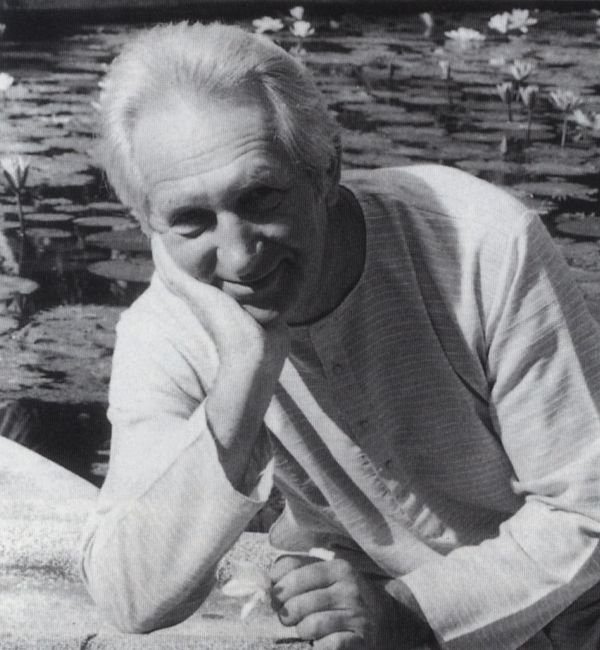
Henryk Skolimowski

Henryk Skolimowski (4 May 1930 in Warsaw – 6 April 2018 in Warsaw) was a Polish philosopher. He completed technical studies, musicology and philosophy in Warsaw. He received his Ph.D. in philosophy from Oxford University.

The student of Tadeusz Kotarbiński and Kazimierz Ajdukiewicz, he specialized in logic and philosophy of language. Skolimowski earned a doctorate at the University of Oxford, where he also taught before he began his professorships at the University of Southern California in Los Angeles, and then at the University of Michigan, Ann Arbor, where he was for many years a professor of philosophy, and then held the position of professor emeritus. He was considered to be the leading thinker in the field of eco-philosophy.

Skolimowski's work was targeted at overcoming human angst and disconnection caused in part by the overwhelming preponderance of modern technology, which had its seeds in the Industrial Revolution. Our accelerating dependence on technology at the expense of a right relationship with Nature and the planet is a prime concern within Skolimowski's work, as is the increasing inability of organized patriarchal religions to provide a meaningful spiritual platform from which modern human beings may appropriately evolve.

During decades of travel and involvement with leading thinkers across the globe, Skolimowski had become familiar a great variety of cultures, and included winning precepts from them into his works. He was the author of over 50 books and hundreds of scientific and academic papers. He was also a poet. He wrote in English. In the years 1992–1997 Skolimowski held the position of Chair of Eco-Philosophy at Technical University of Lodz, the first such position of its kind in the world.

== Career ==
Degrees and Scientific Titles:

- M.Sc (geodesy) 1956 – Warsaw University of Technology, Warsaw, Poland,
- MA (Philosophy) 1959 – University of Warsaw, Warsaw, Poland,
- D.Phil. 1964 – University of Oxford, Oxford, United Kingdom.

Academic experience:

- University of Oxford, Oxford, United Kingdom – scholar 1959–60, 1962–64, 1968–69
- University of Cambridge, Cambridge, United Kingdom – research scholar 1969–70
- University of Southern California, Los Angeles, CA, USA – Assistant professor, associate professor 1964–70
- Philosopher in Residence at Arcosanti, Arizona, USA 1969–85
- University of Michigan, Ann Arbor, MI, USA – Professor 1971–1993
- Philosopher in Residence, Dartington Hall, Devon, UK 1979–83
- Technical University of Lodz, Chair of Ecological Philosophy, Lodz, Poland – Professor 1992–97

He was a member of scientific organizations such as:

- Task Force on Appropriate Technology of the US Congress
- Program on Technology and Culture of UNESCO 1976–78
- Teilhard Society in London – Vice President 1980–90
- International Union for the Conservation of Nature 1981–86
- Committee "Man and Environment", Polish Academy of Sciences 1995–2010

Other information:

- Skolimowski is part of a new branch of philosophy called Eco-Philosophy, which claims that THE WORLD IS A SANCTUARY. From this central assumption immediately follows reverence for life and for all there is, responsibility for the world and society, altruism and sharing as the basis for ethics, and ecological spirituality, which maintains that the ecological and the spiritual are one.
- Swimming against the current of the disengaged academic philosophy, Skolimowski insisted, for the last four decades, that philosophy must be committed to life, must be living philosophy, helping life to unfold and to flourish. More recently, he proposed a new cosmology of light, according to which Light is the source of it all; it is truly a Great Mother; if we have the eyes to see and the mind to bear its greatness. Light is the source of all spiritualities and religions.
- Creator of a new department of philosophy - eco-philosophy, Poland 1993
- Founder of the Eco-Philosophy Center based in Ann Arbor, Michigan, USA. 1981
- Member of the President's Council for Environmental in Poland 1994/97

Awards and distinctions:

- Gold Medal of Merit, Ministry of the Environment, Poland 1999
- Medal of the City of Wroclaw 1997 (for activities in the field of environmental protection in Poland)
- Zielone Serce Przyrodzie, Warsaw 2001

== Bibliography ==
Books

- 2011. The Lotus and the Mud: Autobiography of a Philosopher. Creative Fire Press.
- 2010. World as Sanctuary: The Cosmic Philosophy of Henryk Skolimowski. Creative Fire Press.
- 2010. Let There Be Light: The Mysterious Journey of Cosmic Creativity. Wisdom Tree.
- 2005. Philosophy for a New Civilization. Gyan Publishing House.
- 2001. The Dawn of the Ecological Era (with Ashwani Kumar). Concept Books.
- 1999. Dharma, Ecology and Wisdom in the Third Millennium. Concept Books.
- 1994. The Participatory Mind: A New Theory of Knowledge and of the Universe. Penguin/Arkana.
- 1994. Eco-Yoga: Practice and Meditations for Walking in Beauty. Gaia Books.
- 1993. A Sacred Place to Dwell. Element Books.
- 1992. Living Philosophy: Eco-Philosophy as a Tree of Life. Penguin/Arkana.
- 1991. Dancing Shiva in the Ecological Age. Clarion Books
- 1989. The Other Side of the Rational Mind. The Intl Cultural Foundation.
- 1989. Out of the Cosmic Dust. Vasanta Press.
- 1985. Eco-Theology: Toward a Religion for our Times. Eco-Philosophy Publications.
- 1984. Theatre of the Mind. Quest Books.
- 1983. Technology and Human Destiny. Madras Univ. Press.
- 1981. Eco-Philosophy: Designing New Tactics for Living. Marion Boyars.
- 1967. Polish Analytical Philosophy. Routledge and Kegan Paul.

Articles

In addition Henryk Skolimowski published over 600 articles. A more complete Bibliography of Henryk Skolimowski can be found in the book, THE WORLD AS SANCTUARY, Creative Fire Press, 2010.
