= Kanna (Lycaonia) =

Coordinates: 37°53′57″N 33°11′51″E

Kanna or Kana (Latin: Canna) was a town of ancient Lycaonia, inhabited in Roman and Byzantine times, when it was a bishopric suffragan of Iconium.

Its site is located near Beşağıl, Karatay, Konya Province, Turkey.
