= Veal Veng district =

Veal Veng ស្រុកវាលវែង Veal Veaeng
- District (srok)
- Location in Cambodia
- Coordinates: 12°22′N 103°15′E
- Country: Cambodia
- Province: Pursat
- Communes: 5
- Villages: 20

Population (1998)
  - Total: 57,523
- Time zone: +7
- Geocode: 1506

Veal Veng (or Veal Veaeng), Khmer: ស្រុកវាលវែង, is a district in Pursat Province, Cambodia. The district capital is Pramoey town located 109 km (68 mi) by road from National Highway Number 5.

== Characteristics ==
Veal Veang shares a border with Battambang Province to the north, Thailand to the west, Koh Kong Province to the south and the Pursat districts of Phnum Kravanh and Bakan to the east. The northern end of the Cardamom Mountains cover the eastern edge of Veal Veang to the Thai border. According to the 1998 Census, Veal Veang district is made up of 5 communes and 20 villages. However, the population of the district was not enumerated in the census due to security concerns. From 1979 until the end of the 1990s, Veal Veang was one of the last remaining strongholds of the Khmer Rouge.

The legacy of the Cambodian Civil War and over 30 years of Khmer Rouge occupation has left many parts of the district heavily contaminated with landmines. As mines are cleared and roads improved, logging both legal and illegal threatens the remaining forested areas. Veal Veang is also home to around 300 families of the few remaining ethnic minority Pear people.
