= Pursat =

City in Pursat Province, Cambodia

Pursat ពោធិ៍សាត់
- City
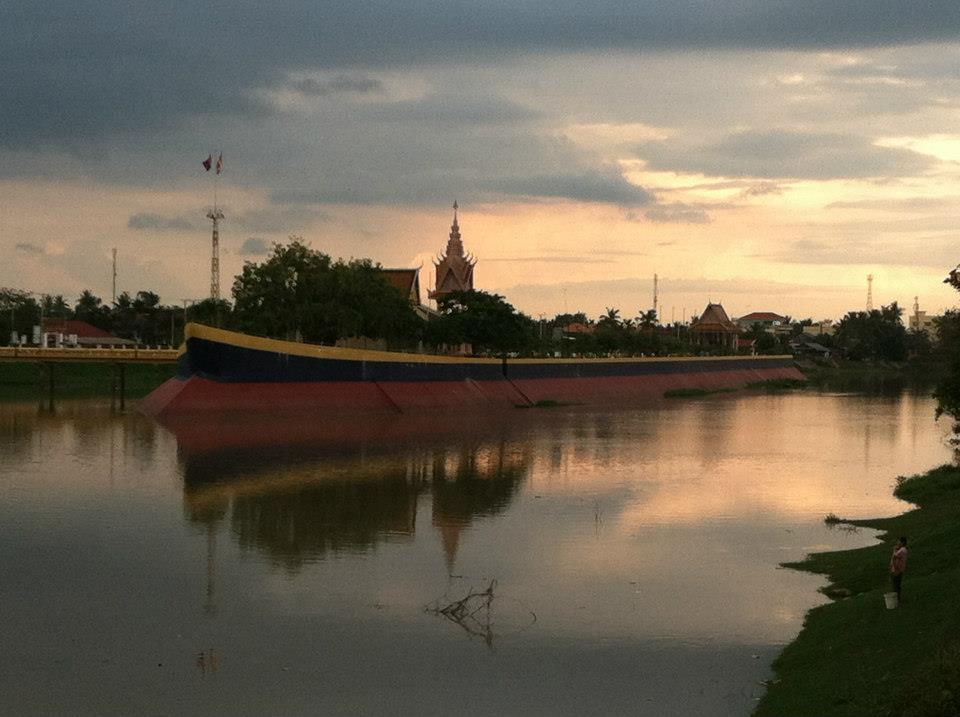
- Sompove Meas Island in Pursat city center.

- Location within Cambodia
- Coordinates: 12°32′N 103°55′E
- Country: Cambodia
- Province: Pursat Province
- District: Sampov Meas District

Government
  - Type: City
- Elevation: 17 m (56 ft)

Population (2019)
  - Total: 58,255

Pursat (/poʊˈsɒt/ poh-SOT; Khmer: ពោធិ៍សាត់, Poŭthĭsăt [poːˈsat̚]) is the capital of Pursat Province, Cambodia. Its name derived from a type of tree and it lies on the Pursat River. The city is famous as the place of mythical 16th century neak ta of Khleang Moeung.

== Climate ==
Climate data for Pursat (1982–2024)
| Month | Jan | Feb | Mar | Apr | May | Jun | Jul | Aug | Sep | Oct | Nov | Dec | Year |
|---|---|---|---|---|---|---|---|---|---|---|---|---|---|
| Mean daily maximum °C (°F) | 31.4 (88.5) | 31.6 (88.9) | 32.4 (90.3) | 34.1 (93.4) | 34.4 (93.9) | 33.3 (91.9) | 32.9 (91.2) | 32.0 (89.6) | 31.6 (88.9) | 31.4 (88.5) | 31.3 (88.3) | 30.9 (87.6) | 32.3 (90.1) |
| Mean daily minimum °C (°F) | 20.9 (69.6) | 21.7 (71.1) | 21.9 (71.4) | 22.7 (72.9) | 23.4 (74.1) | 24.6 (76.3) | 24.1 (75.4) | 23.9 (75.0) | 23.6 (74.5) | 22.9 (73.2) | 22.6 (72.7) | 21.0 (69.8) | 22.8 (73.0) |
| Average precipitation mm (inches) | 12.7 (0.50) | 10.7 (0.42) | 50.3 (1.98) | 84.3 (3.32) | 176.5 (6.95) | 161.3 (6.35) | 144.5 (5.69) | 195.1 (7.68) | 245.5 (9.67) | 265.1 (10.44) | 120.4 (4.74) | 17.4 (0.69) | 1,483.8 (58.43) |
Source: World Meteorological Organization
