= Ahmadabad Rural District (Eqlid County) =

Rural district in Fars province, Iran

Ahmadabad Rural District Persian: دهستان احمدآباد
- Rural District
- Location within Iran
- Coordinates: 30°21′52″N 52°42′09″E
- Country: Iran
- Province: Fars
- County: Eqlid
- District: Hasanabad
- Capital: Ahmadabad

Population (2016)
  - Total: 5,324
- Time zone: UTC+3:30 (IRST)

Ahmadabad Rural District (Persian: دهستان احمدآباد) is in Hasanabad District of Eqlid County, Fars province, Iran. Its capital is the village of Ahmadabad.

== Demographics ==
=== Population ===
At the time of the 2006 National Census, the rural district's population was 5,003 in 1,152 households. There were 4,946 inhabitants in 1,266 households at the following census of 2011. The 2016 census measured the population of the rural district as 5,324 in 1,479 households. The most populous of its 42 villages was Emamzadeh Esmail, with 2,178 people.
