= Bakan Rural District =

Rural district in Fars province, Iran

Bakan Rural District Persian: دهستان بكان
- Rural District
- Location within Iran
- Coordinates: 30°27′02″N 52°20′00″E
- Country: Iran
- Province: Fars
- County: Eqlid
- District: Hasanabad
- Capital: Bakan

Population (2016)
  - Total: 3,111
- Time zone: UTC+3:30 (IRST)

Bakan Rural District (Persian: دهستان بكان) is in Hasanabad District of Eqlid County, Fars province, Iran. Its capital is the village of Bakan.

== Demographics ==
=== Population ===
At the time of the 2006 National Census, the rural district's population was 3,274 in 720 households. There were 4,011 inhabitants in 1,039 households at the following census of 2011. The 2016 census measured the population of the rural district as 3,111 in 915 households. The most populous of its 28 villages was Bakan, with 1,144 people.
