= Hasanabad Rural District (Eqlid County) =

Rural district in Fars province, Iran

Hasanabad Rural District Persian: دهستان حسن آباد
- Rural District
- Location within Iran
- Coordinates: 30°30′08″N 52°28′51″E
- Country: Iran
- Province: Fars
- County: Eqlid
- District: Hasanabad
- Capital: Hasanabad

Population (2016)
  - Total: 6,048
- Time zone: UTC+3:30 (IRST)

Hasanabad Rural District (Persian: دهستان حسن‌آباد) is in Hasanabad District of Eqlid County, Fars province, Iran. It is administered from the city of Hasanabad.

== Demographics ==
=== Population ===
At the time of the 2006 National Census, the rural district's population was 7,421 in 1,535 households. There were 6,169 inhabitants in 1,537 households at the following census of 2011. The 2016 census measured the population of the rural district as 6,048 in 1,675 households. The most populous of its 40 villages was Ardali, with 704 people.
