= Hasanabad District =

District in Fars province, Iran

Hasanabad District Persian: بخش حسن‌آباد
- District
- Location within Iran
- Coordinates: 30°25′26″N 52°31′16″E
- Country: Iran
- Province: Fars
- County: Eqlid
- Capital: Hasanabad

Population (2016)
  - Total: 16,528
- Time zone: UTC+3:30 (IRST)

Hasanabad District (Persian: بخش حسن‌آباد) is in Eqlid County, Fars province, Iran. Its capital is the city of Hasanabad.

== History ==
After the 2006 National Census, the village of Hasanabad was elevated to the status of a city.

== Demographics ==
=== Population ===
At the time of the 2006 census, the district's population was 15,698 in 3,407 households. The following census in 2011 counted 17,020 people in 4,326 households. The 2016 census measured the population of the district as 16,528 inhabitants in 4,651 households.

=== Administrative divisions ===
Hasanabad District Population
Administrative Divisions	2006	2011	2016
Ahmadabad RD	5,003	4,946	5,324
Bakan RD	3,274	4,011	3,111
Hasanabad RD	7,421	6,169	6,048
Hasanabad (city)		1,894	2,045
Total	15,698	17,020	16,528
RD = Rural District
