= Eqlid County =

County in Fars province, Iran

Eqlid County Persian: شهرستان اقلید
- County
- Location of Eqlid County in Fars province (top left, yellow)

- Location of Fars province in Iran
- Coordinates: 30°41′N 52°21′E
- Country: Iran
- Province: Fars
- Capital: Eqlid
- Districts: Central, Hasanabad, Sedeh

Population (2016)
  - Total: 93,763
- Time zone: UTC+3:30 (IRST)

Eqlid County (Persian: شهرستان اقلید) is in Fars province, Iran. Its capital is the city of Eqlid.

== History ==
After the 2006 National Census, Khosrow Shirin Rural District was separated from the county to join Abadeh County. The village of Eslamiyeh was elevated to the status of the city of Dezhkord, and the village of Hasanabad became a city as well.

== Demographics ==
=== Population ===
At the time of the 2006 census, the county's population was 99,003 in 21,216 households. The following census in 2011 counted 93,975 people in 25,048 households. The 2016 census measured the population of the county as 93,763 in 27,421 households.

=== Administrative divisions ===
Eqlid County's population history and administrative structure over three consecutive censuses are shown in the following table.

Eqlid County Population
Administrative Divisions	2006	2011	2016
Central District	65,798	56,805	57,875
Khonjesht RD	8,385	8,619	9,687
Khosrow Shirin RD (Note: Transferred to Abadeh County)	2,894		
Shahr Meyan RD	4,810	3,634	3,847
Eqlid (city)	49,709	44,552	44,341
Hasanabad District	15,698	17,020	16,528
Ahmadabad RD	5,003	4,946	5,324
Bakan RD	3,274	4,011	3,111
Hasanabad RD	7,421	6,169	6,048
Hasanabad (city)		1,894	2,045
Sedeh District	17,507	18,137	18,290
Aspas RD	4,116	3,933	3,946
Dezhkord RD	7,438	3,380	3,236
Sedeh RD	381	467	437
Dezhkord (city) (Note: Formerly the village of Eslamiyeh)		4,220	3,924
Sedeh (city)	5,572	6,137	6,747
Total	99,003	93,975	93,763
RD = Rural District

== See also ==
Media related to Eqlid County at Wikimedia Commons
