= Izadkhast Caravanserai =

UNESCO World Heritage Site in Iran

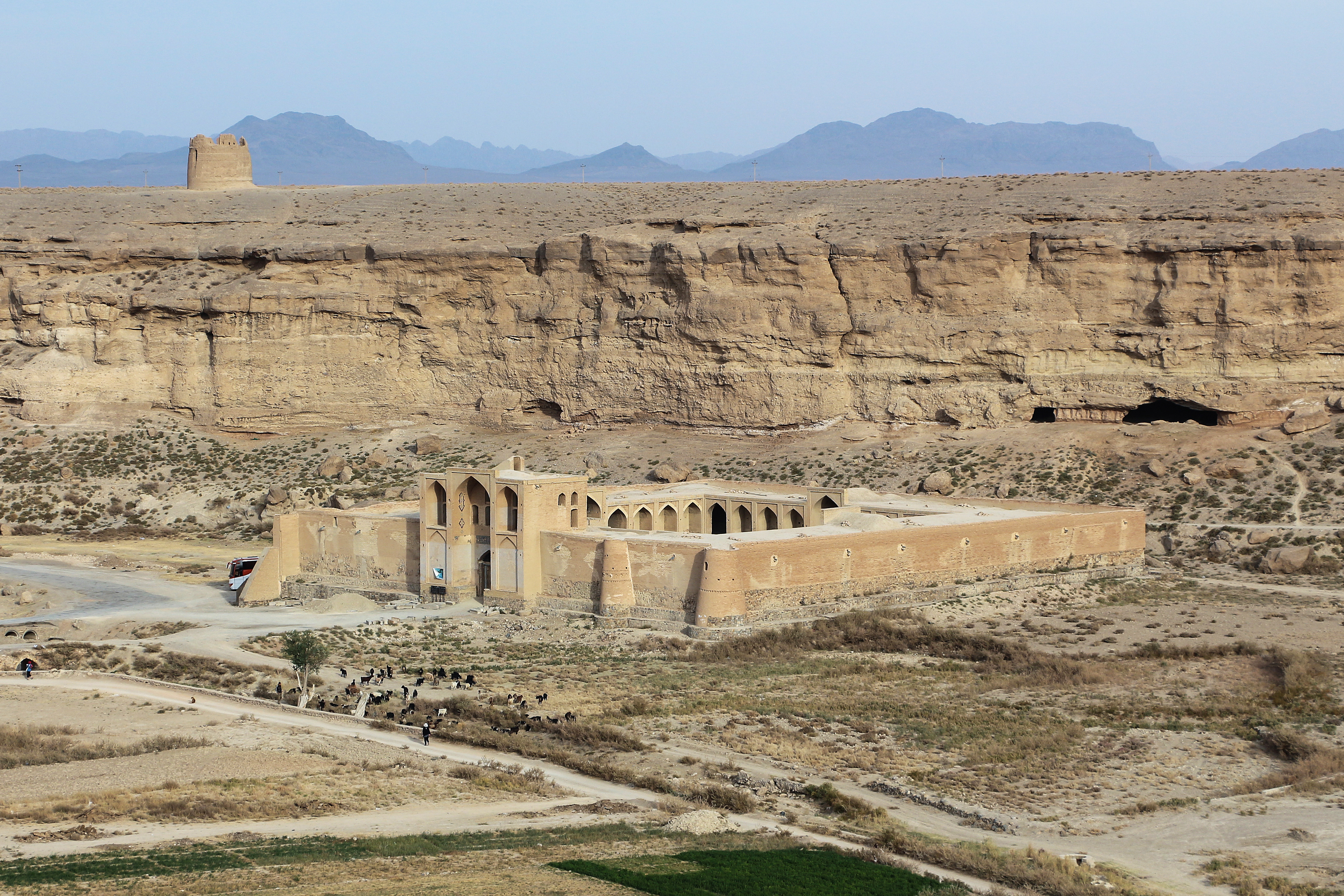
- Izadkhast Caravanserai in August 2018

- Location within Iran
- 31°30′58″N 52°07′26″E
- Type: Caravanserai
- Location: Izadkhvast, Abadeh County, Iran
- Region: Fars province
- Part of: The Complex of Izadkhast

Site notes
- Architectural styles: Sasanian, Qajar
- Condition: Ruined
- Public access: Yes

UNESCO World Heritage Site
- Part of: The Persian Caravanserai
- Criteria: Cultural: ii, iii
- Reference: 1668-031
- Inscription: 2023 (45th Session)

The Izadkhast Caravanserai (Persian: کاروانسرای ایزدخواست, lit. 'God Desire') is a historic site located in Izadkhast, Fars province, Iran. It was a caravanserai or roadside inn on the ancient Silk Road, serving caravaners and travelers as a place for rest and recovery during long journeys. It is situated in the historical complex of Izadkhast, lying in a natural low basin looking onto the Izadkhast Castle situated in the nearby high bedrock. Its construction dates to the early 17th century during the reign of Abbas the Great.

Izadkhast Caravanserai is one of just 25 caravanserais on the UNESCO List of Persian Caravanserai from among hundreds of other caravanserais from all over Iran. The complex of Izadkhast with the Izadkhast Caravanserai and Izadkhast Castle has been on the UNESCO Tentative List for World Heritage status since 2007.

== Gallery ==
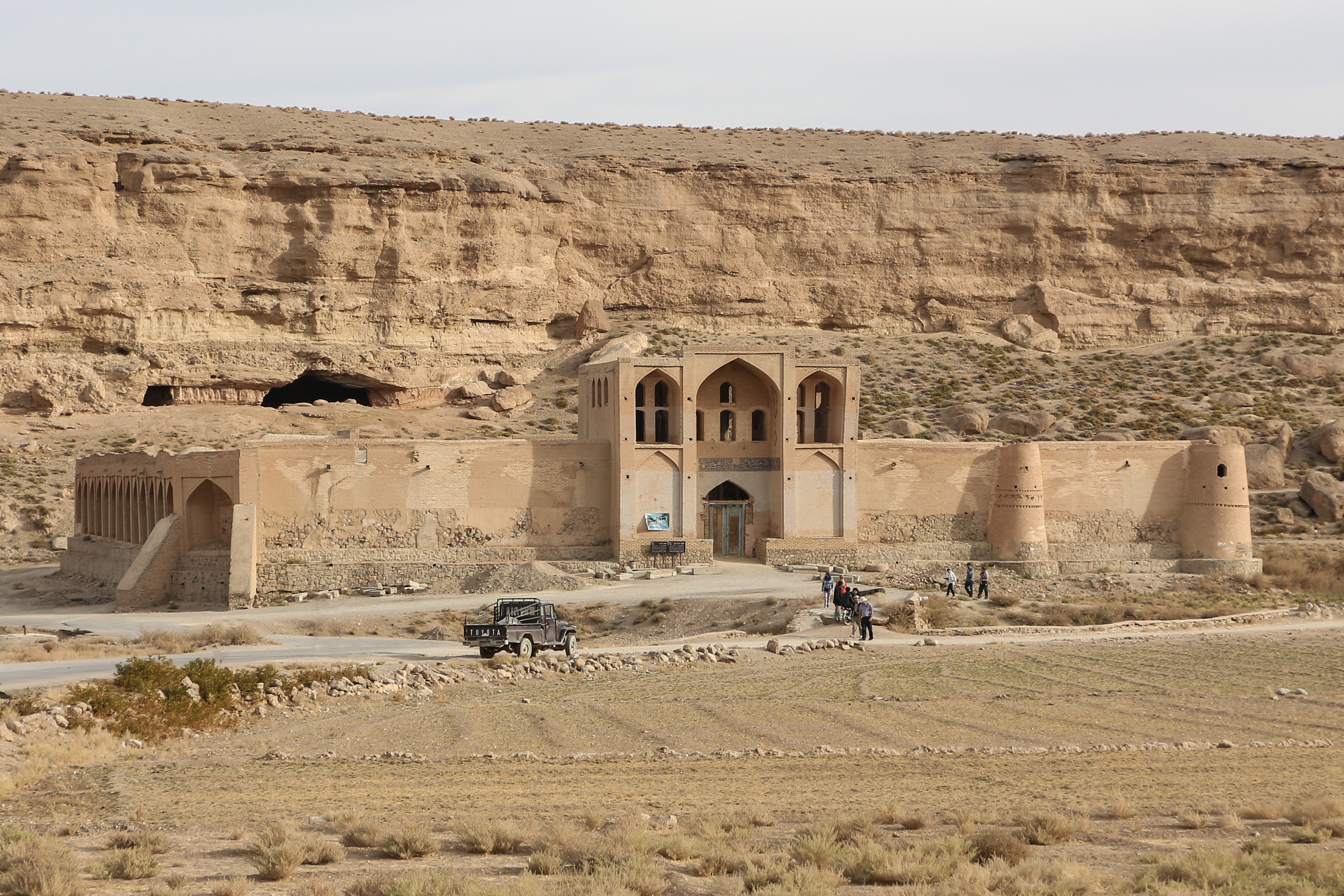
The caravanserai in Izadkhast

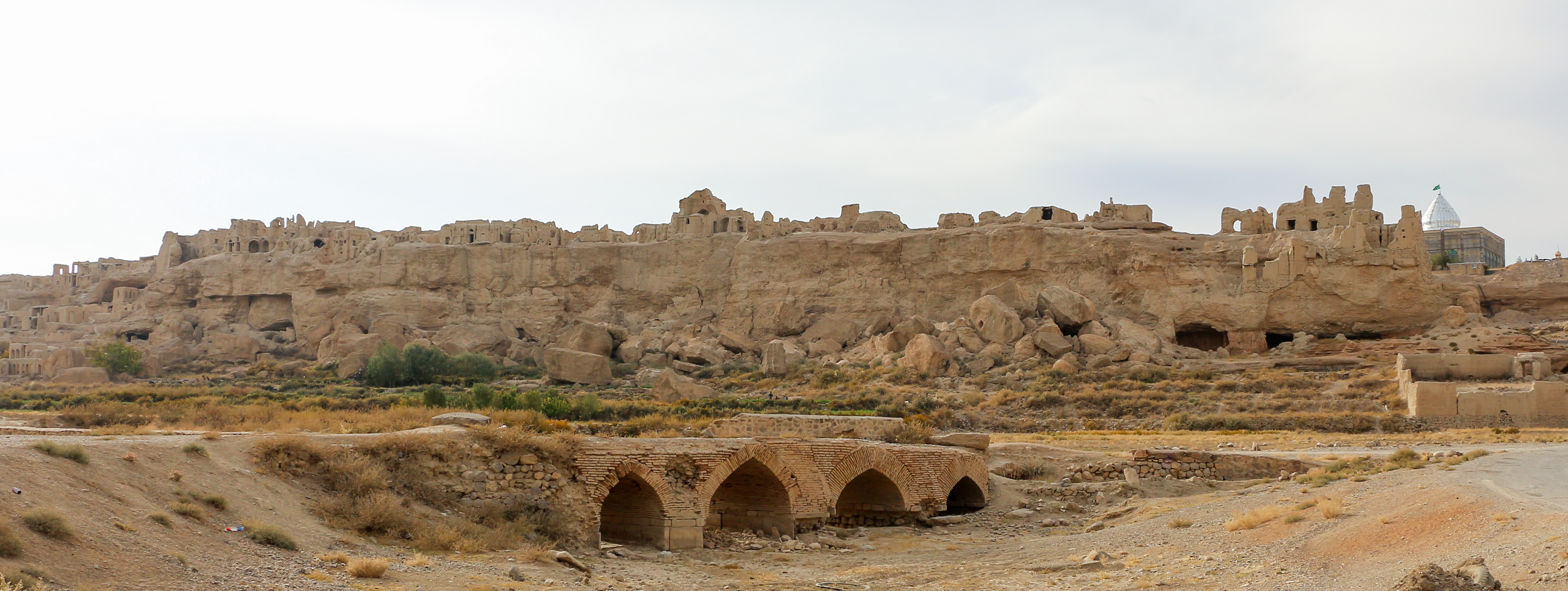
Izadkhvast Castle

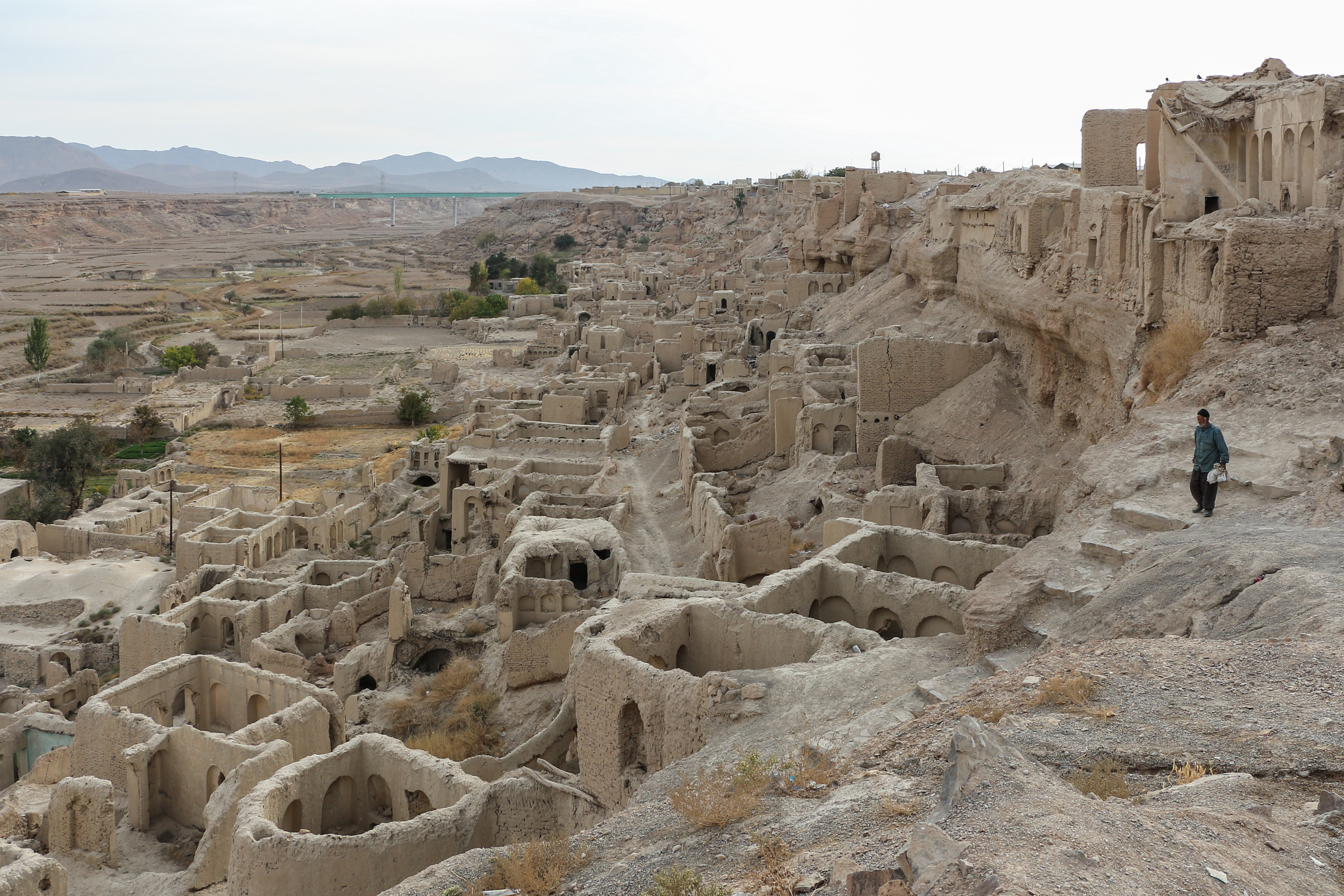
Ruins of the old Izadkhvast town

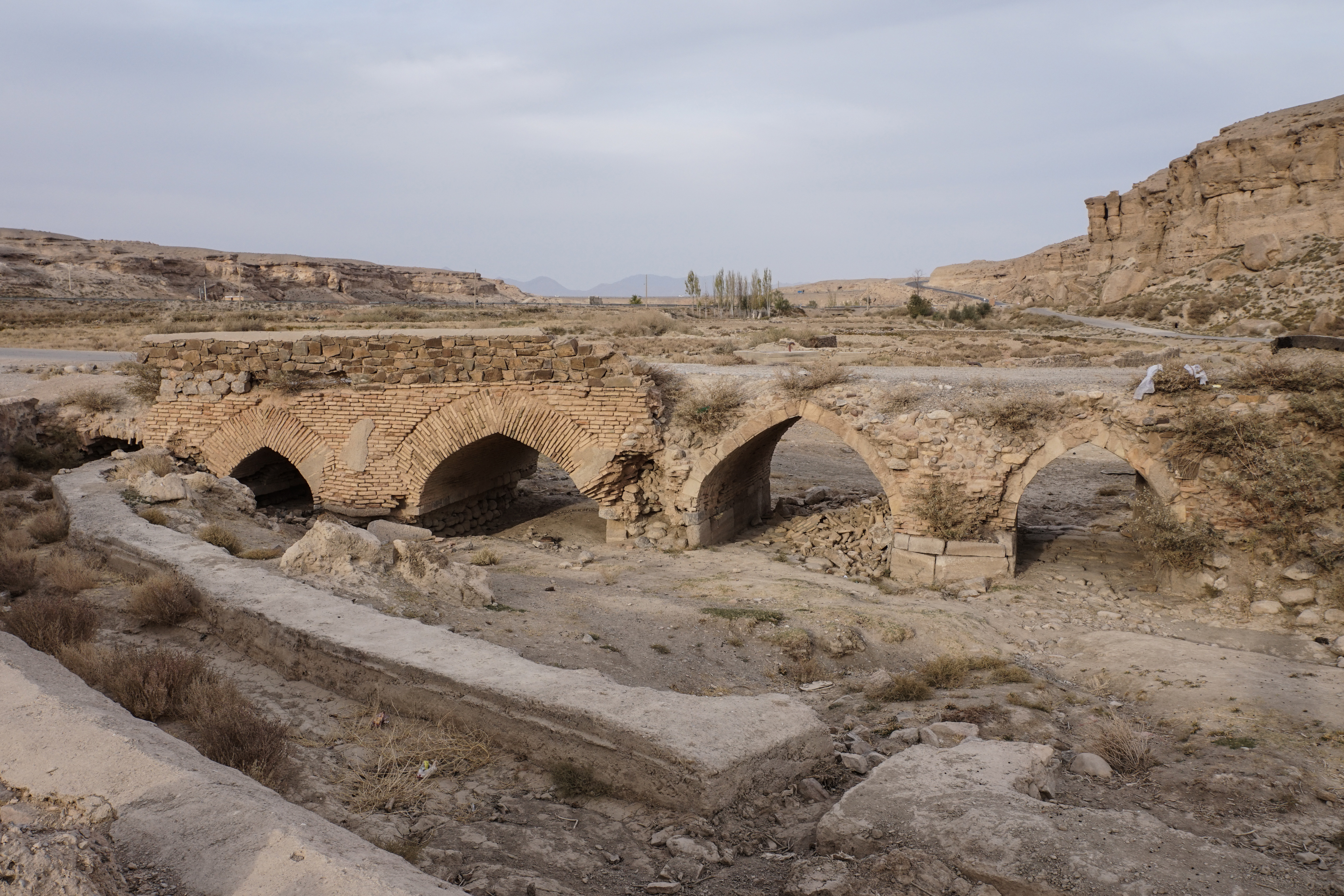
Safavid era bridge to the castle

== See also ==
- Complex of Izadkhast
- Izad-Khast Castle
- List of World Heritage Sites in Iran
