= Complex of Izadkhast =

Historic site in Iran

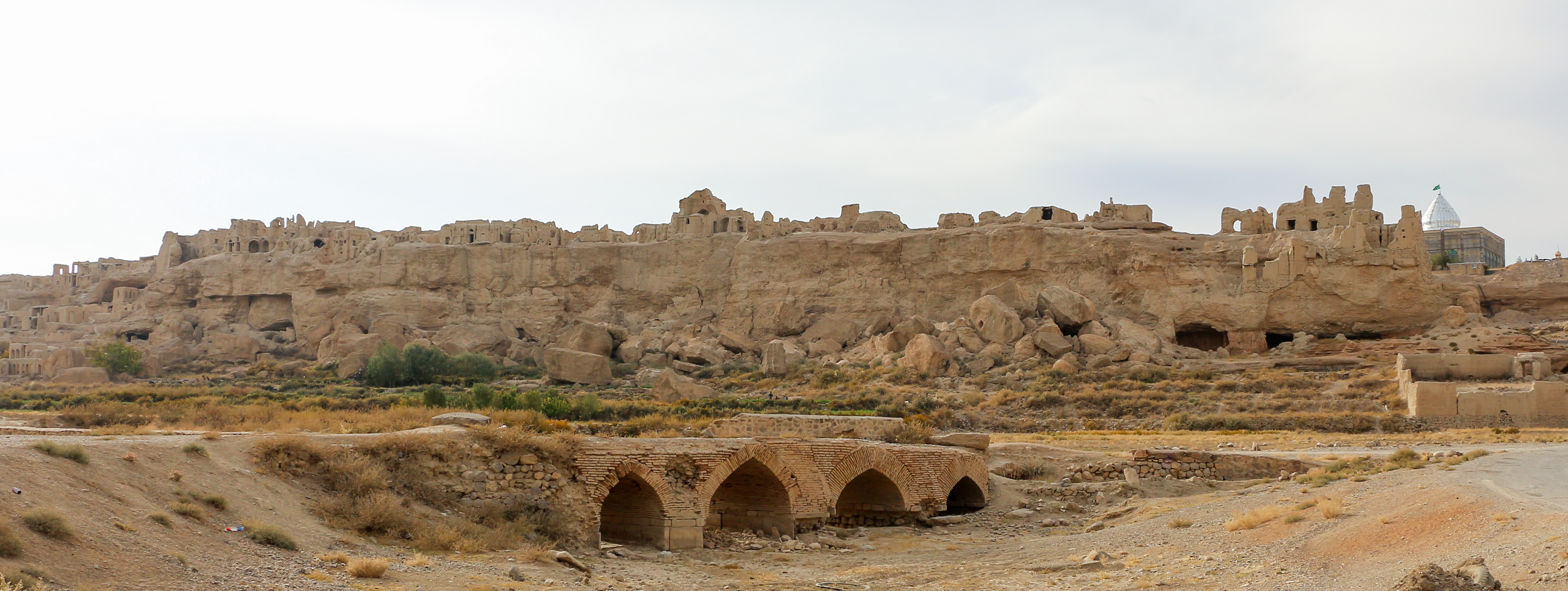
- Izadkhvast ruins seen in August 2016

- Location within Iran
- 31°30′58″N 52°07′26″E
- Location: Izadkhvast, Abadeh County, Iran
- Region: Fars province

Site notes
- Architectural styles: Sasanian; Safavid; Qajar
- Condition: Ruined
- Public access: Yes

Designations
- Designation: on UNESCO World Heritage Tentative List since 2007

The Complex of Izadkhast is located in Izadkhast in the Fars province of Iran, roughly 135 km south of Isfahan. It is a historical complex listed in the UNESCO World Heritage Tentative List. The complex consists of the Izad-khast Castle and old ruined town, the Izadkhast Caravanserai roadside inn, and a Safavid era bridge. The complex is located on a natural base with the castle built on a bedrock to protect it from foreign attacks. The architecture of the complex displays unique characteristics to Izadkhast.

The Complex of Izadkhast of was added to the UNESCO World Heritage Tentative List on 9 August 2007, in the Cultural category.

== Izad-khast Castle ==
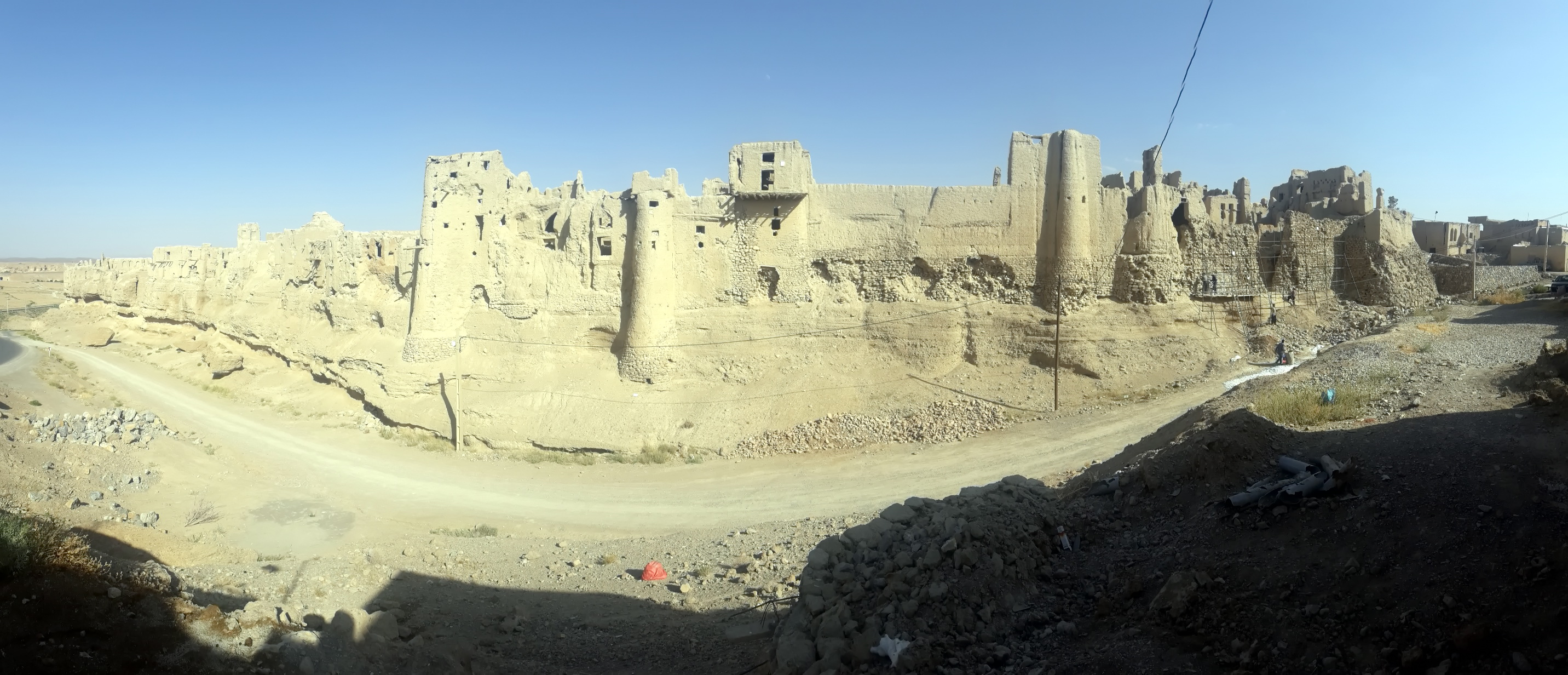
Izad-Khvast Castle in August 2018

The Izad-Khast Castle is the most important section of the complex. It is unique to Izadkhast and the only comparison to its building materials are found in sites of the Izadkhast region. The works within the castle displays different architectural styles and date back to the Sasanian and Qajar eras.

The castle is built on a singular bedrock in a sand construction, close to the valley of Izadkhast. The smallness of the bedrock had led to an increase of castle floors. It also led to an agglomeration of small built rooms. The castle was only accessible from a bridge and a gate built in the most accessible part of the complex.

== Izadkhast Caravanserai ==
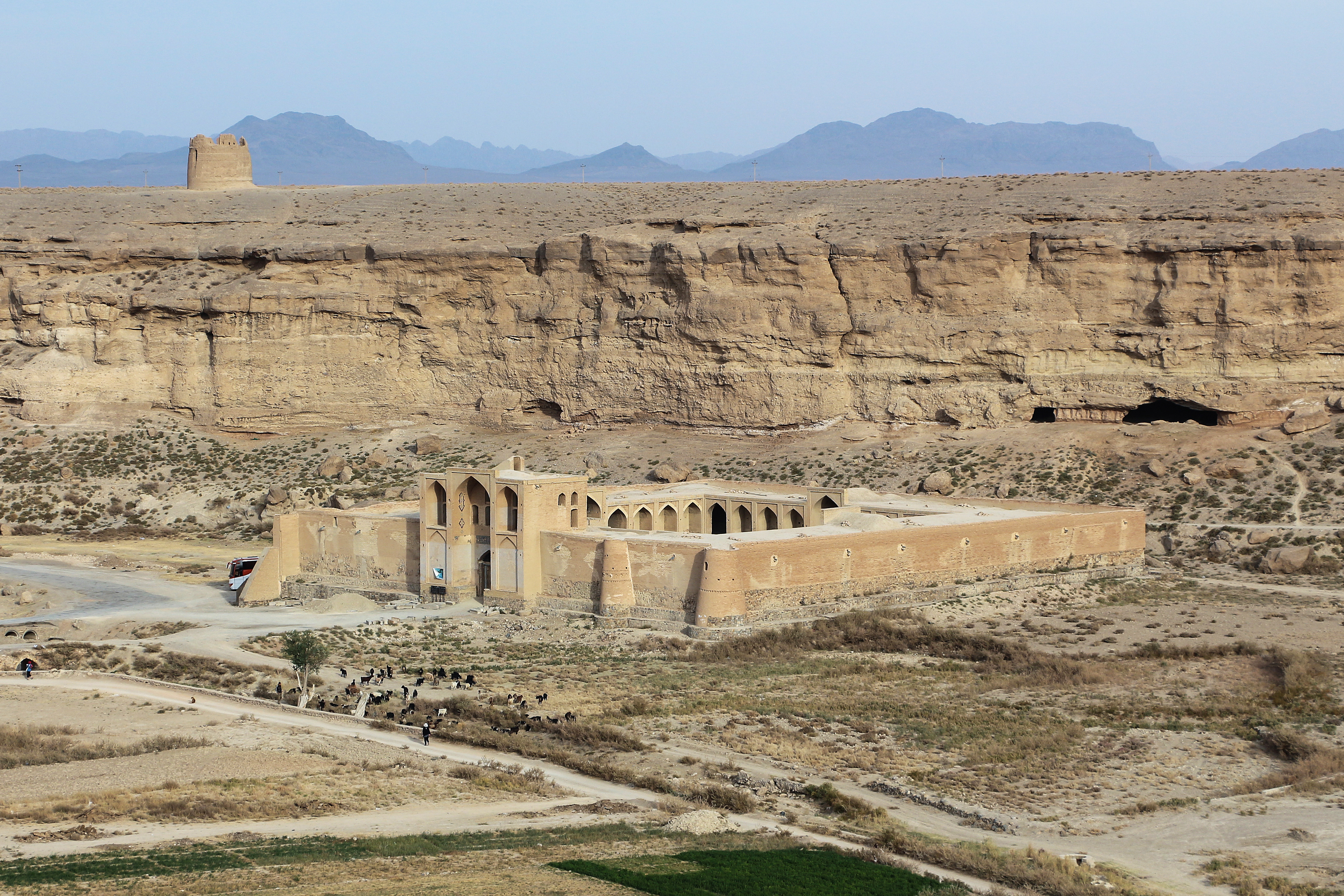
The caravanserai in Izadkhast

The Izadkhast Caravanserai is an ancient caravanserai or roadside inn where caravaners and travelers rested and recover during their journeys.

The Izadkhast Caravanserai is one of 25 caravanserais on the UNESCO List of Persian Caravanserai. It was selected from hundreds of caravanserais from all over Iran under the name of Persian Caravanserais.

== Safavid-period bridge ==
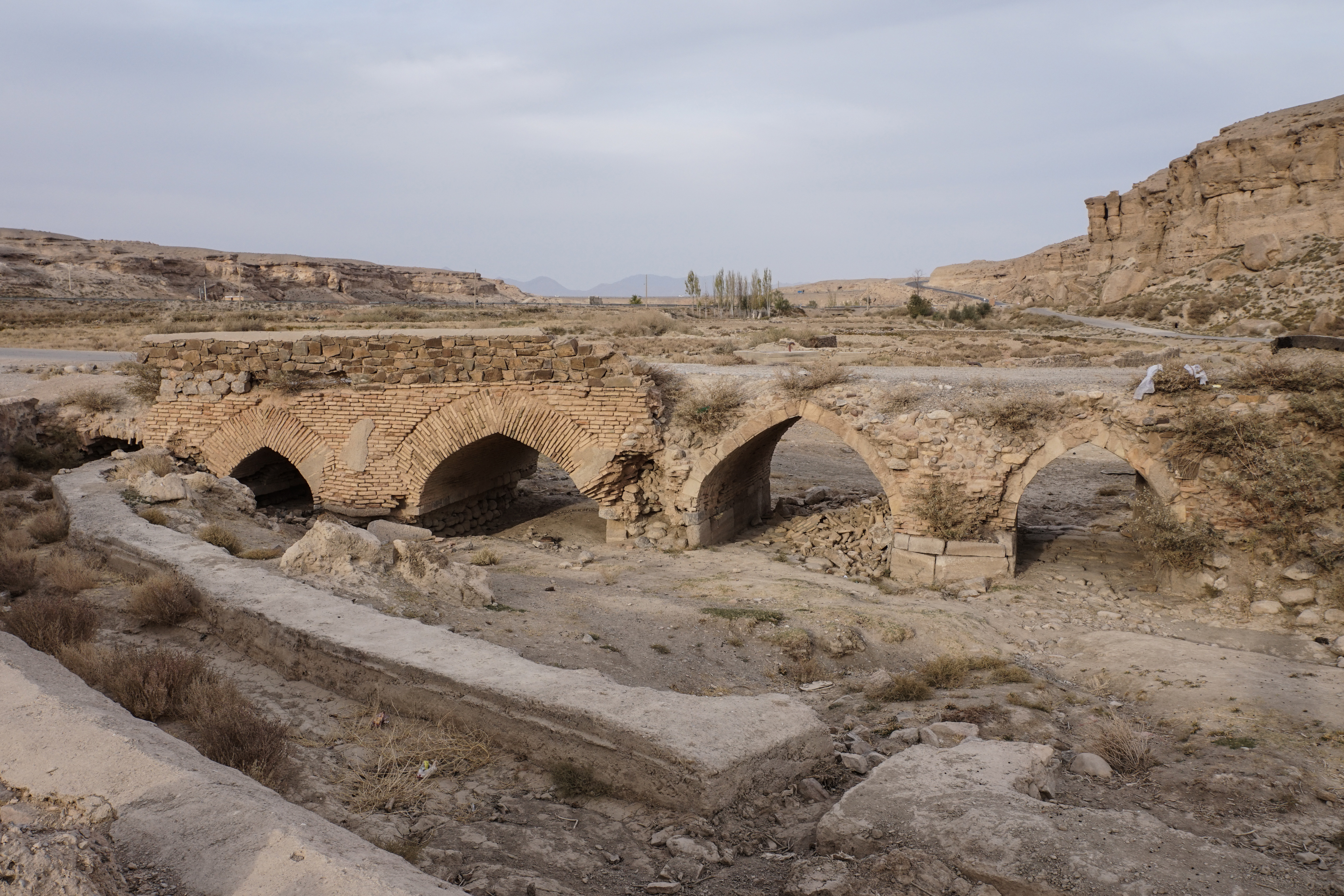
Safavid era bridge

== Gallery ==
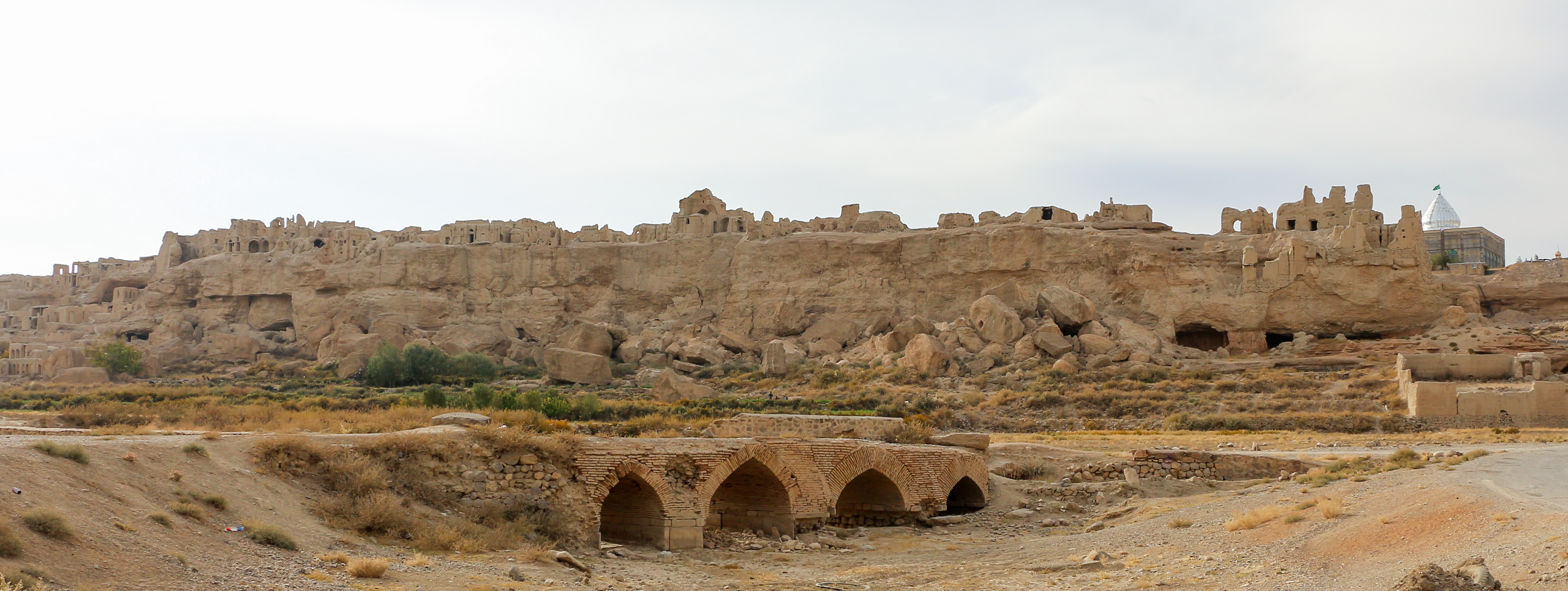
Izadkhvast Castle

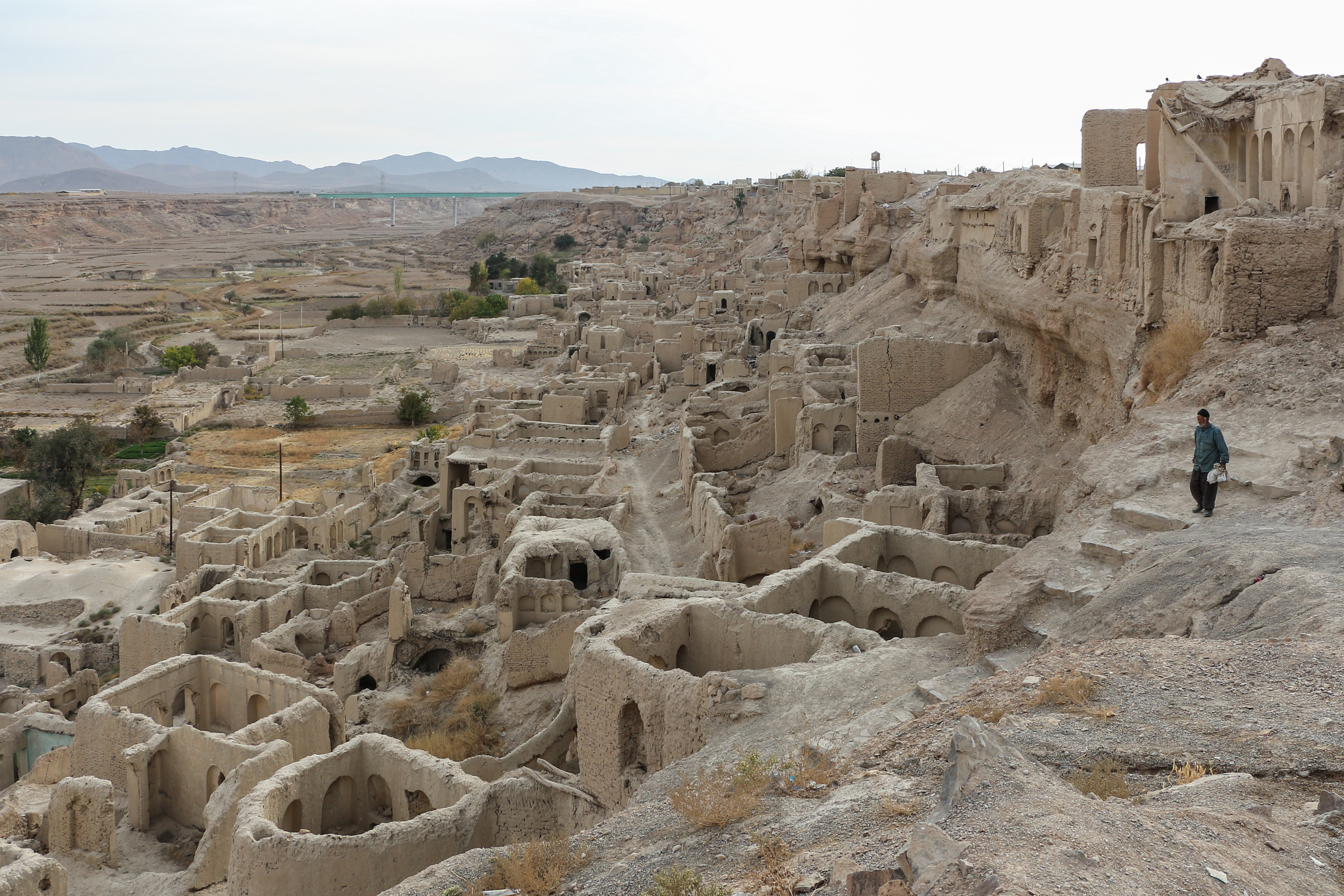
Ruins of the old town

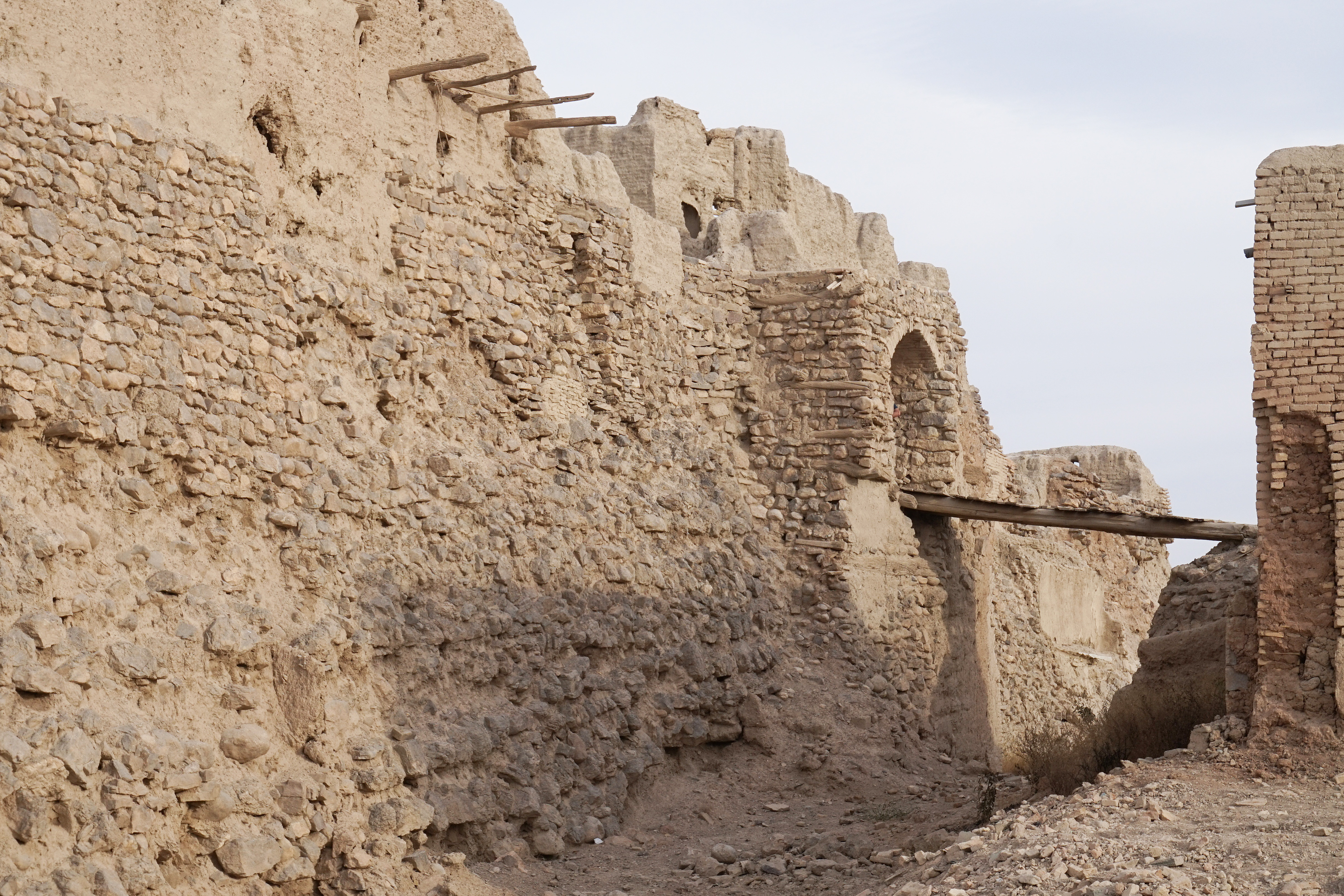
Drawbridge of the castle

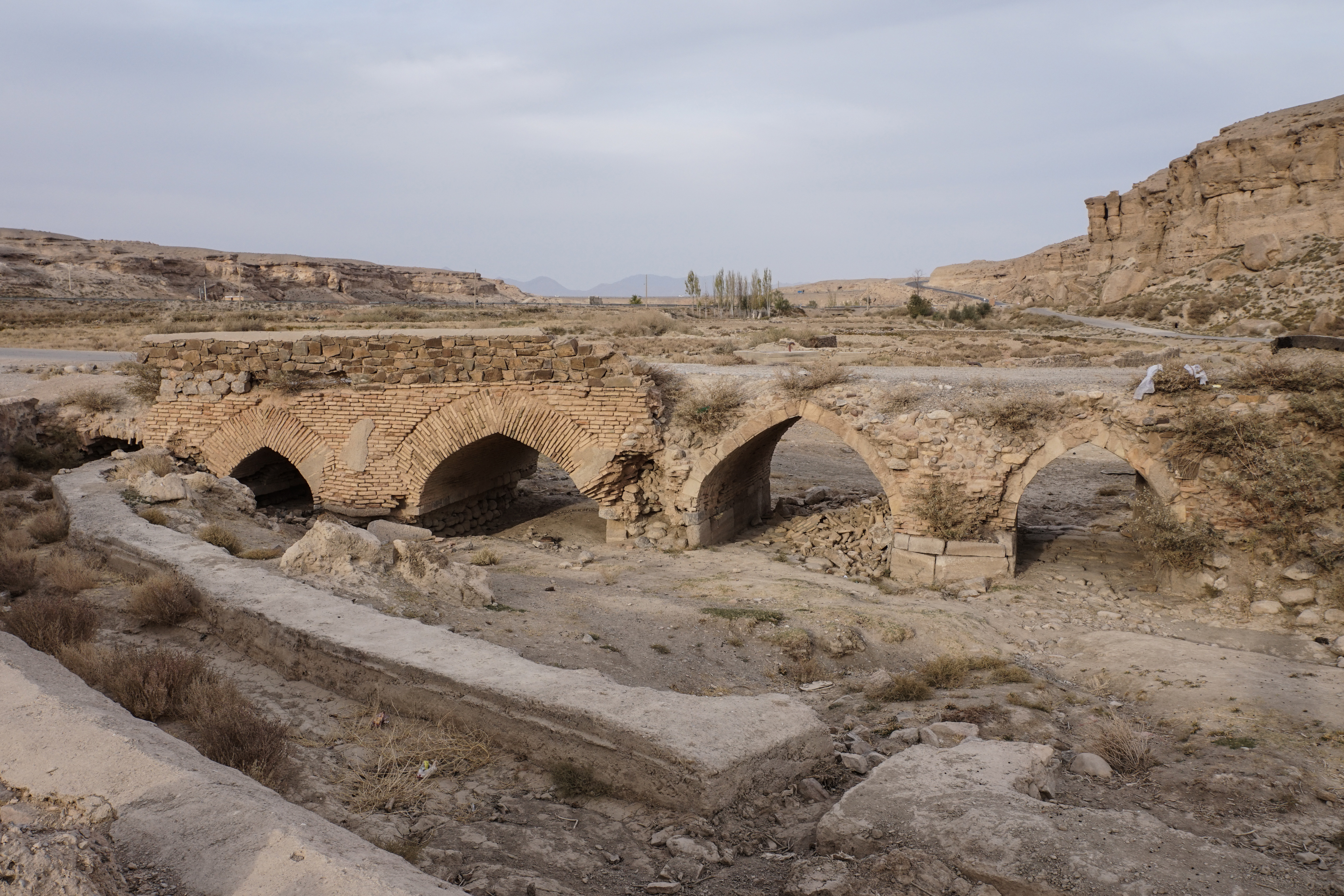
Safavid era bridge

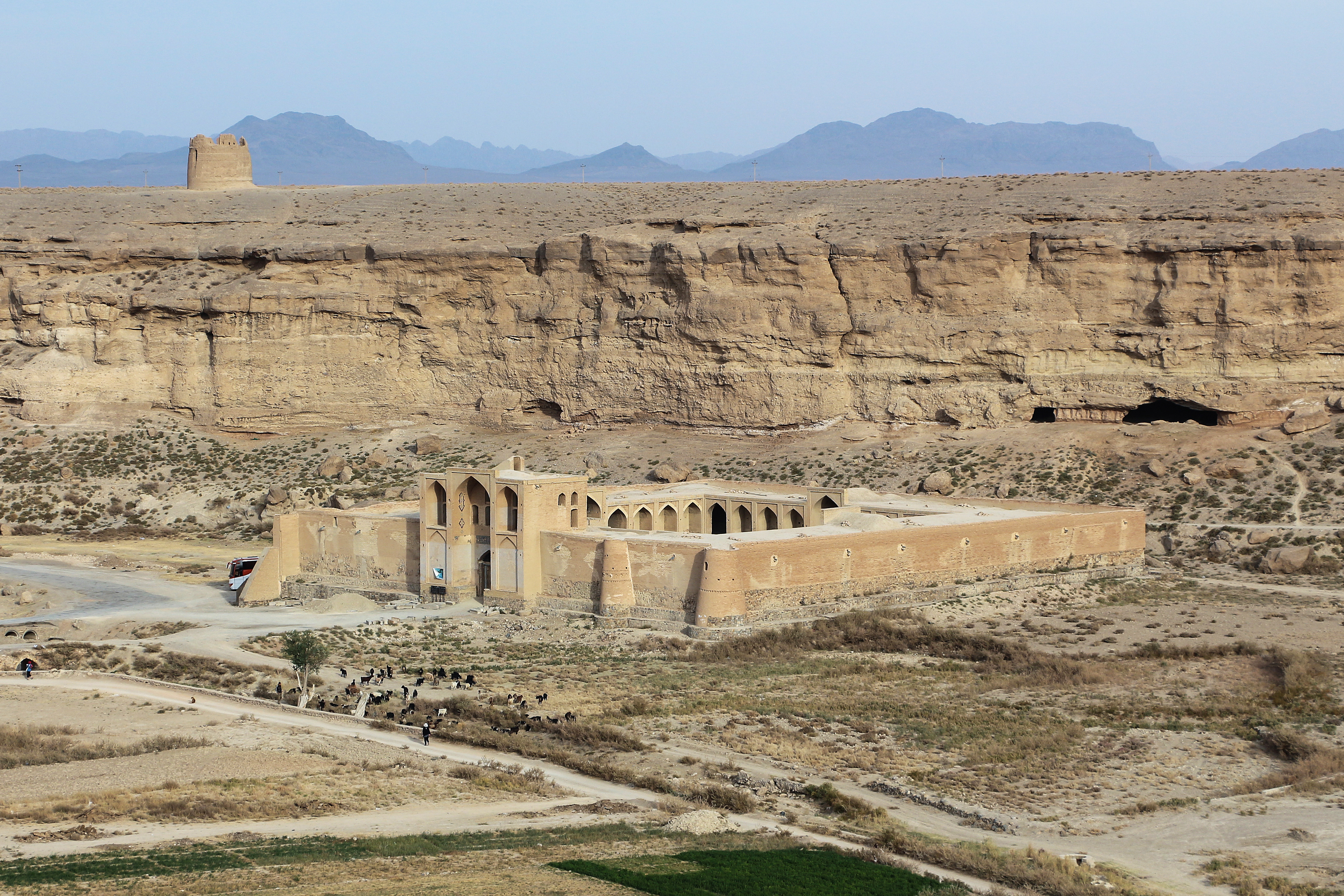
Samanid caravanserai in Izadkhast

== See also ==
- List of World Heritage Sites in Iran
- Izad-Khast Castle
