= Izad-Khast Castle =

Castle in Izadkhast, Iran

Izad-Khwast Castle دژ ایزدخواست
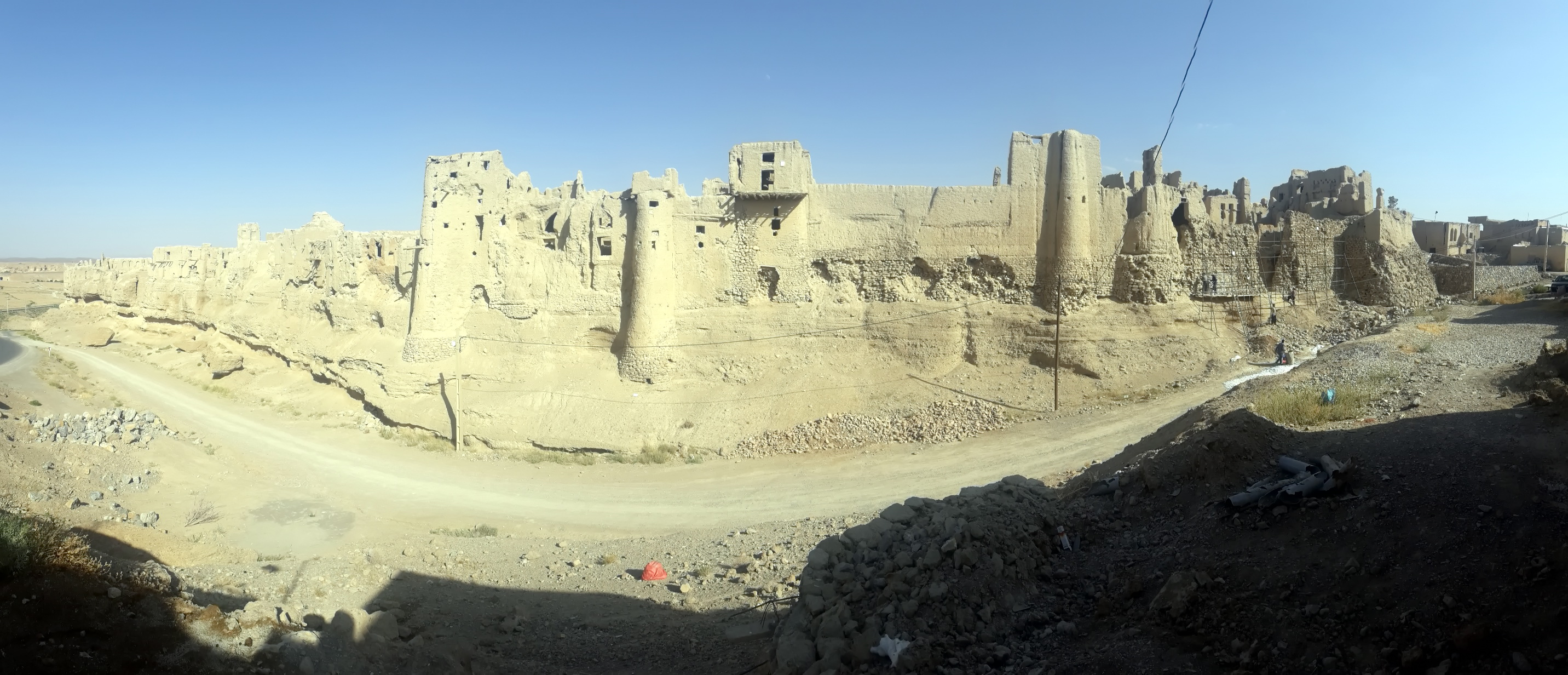
- Izadkhast Fort as seen in August 2018.

- Location within Iran
- 31°30′58″N 52°07′26″E
- Type: Castle
- Location: Izadkhvast, Abadeh County, Iran
- Region: Fars province
- Part of: The Complex of Izadkhast

History
- Built: Sasanian era (224-651 AD)

Site notes
- Material: Adobe (World's first adobe castle)
- Height: 6-15 metres (20-50 feet)
- Architectural styles: Sasanian architecture, Qajar architecture
- Condition: Ruined
- Public access: Yes

Designations
- Designation: on UNESCO World Heritage Tentative List since 2007.

Iran National Heritage List
- Official name: Izad-Khwast Fort
- Type: Fort
- Designated: 1949
- Reference no.: 376
- Conservation organization: Cultural Heritage, Handicrafts and Tourism Organization of Iran

The Izad Khast Castle (Persian: دژ ایزدخواست, romanized: Dezh-e Izadkhast) is located in Izadkhast in Fars province, Iran. The castle was built during the Sasanian era (224 to 651 AD) and functioned as a fortified walled city on the ancient Silk Road that ran through central Iran. It is the second largest adobe building in the world after Arg-e Bam.

The castle was built on a high bedrock overlooking the Izadkhast valley. Inside the castle walls are many narrow alleyways and passages criss-crossing through centuries old tiny houses and buildings.

The castle and surrounding Izadkhast complex has been nominated to the UNESCO World Heritage Tentative List on 9 August 2007, in the Cultural category.

== Location ==
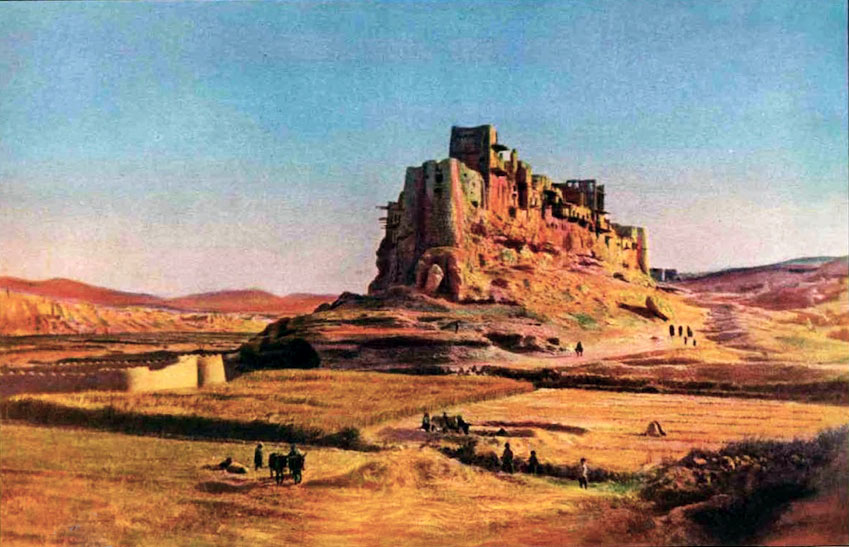
Depiction of Izadkhvast Castle, 1921

The Izad-Khast castle is located on the ancient Silk Road between Shiraz and Isfahan. The site is in the middle of nowhere and surrounded by a desert land. But a high singular bedrock overlooking a valley was an ideal location for the development of a fortified desert city in the middle of nowhere.

The Izadkhvast castle is built on this singular bedrock that juts out to the Izadkhast valley. The valley around it functions as a natural deep trench. Castle fortification walls have been built around the bedrock, tall and almost perpendicular, ranging from 6 to 15 meters on three sides. On the fourth and shorter side of the bedrock, a 30-meter (100 feet) long trench had been dug. The trench is 4 meters across and 4 meters deep. Access to the castle was over the trench, through a small bridge and a gate.

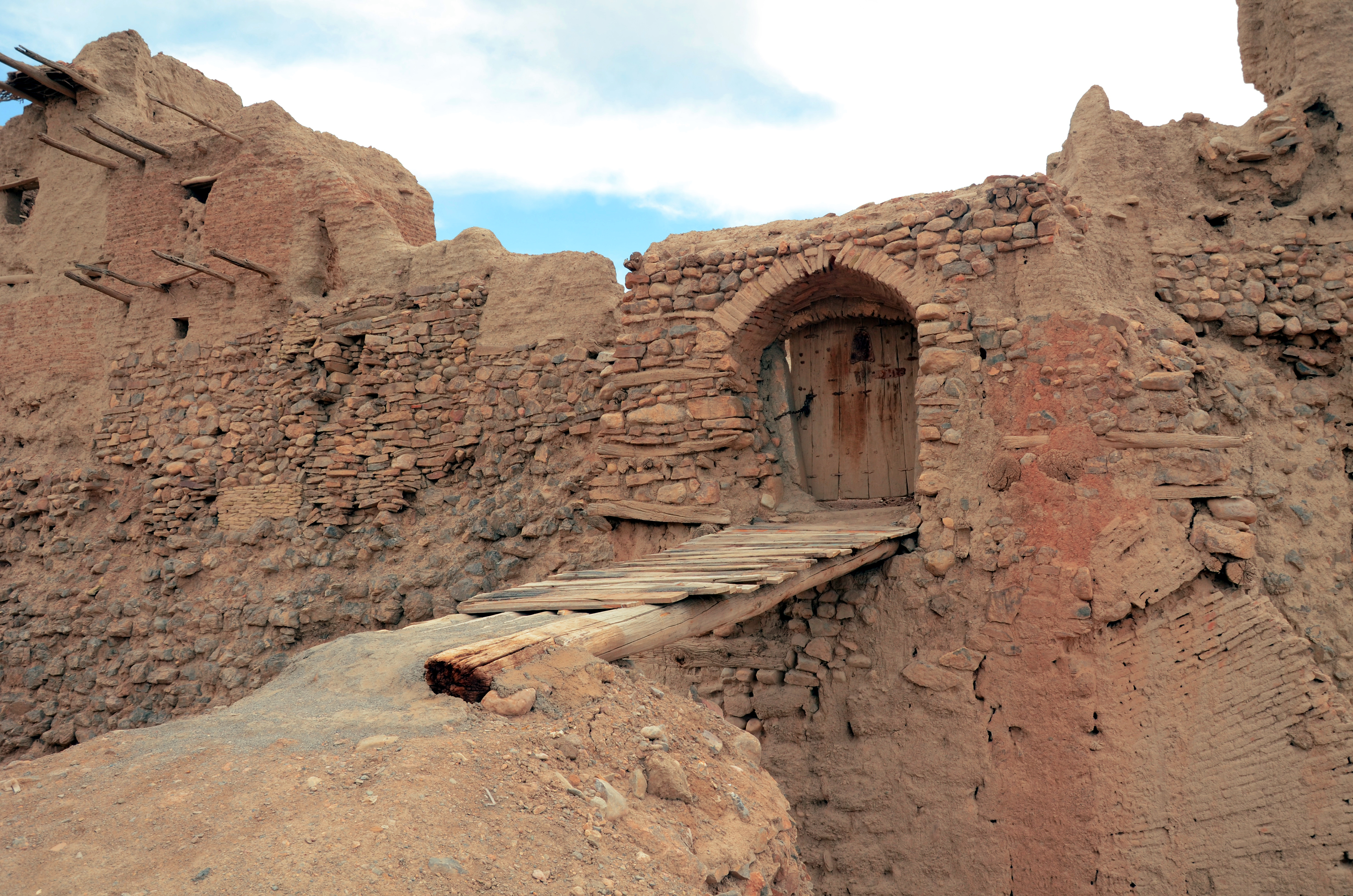
Entrance of the big castle over the trench.

The site's natural topography and added fortifications made the castle one of the most unattainable buildings of the ancient times for robbers and enemies.

On the valley below the castle bedrock are rocky fields, with a barren plateau behind. The Izadkhast caravanserai roadside inn stands alone in this valley, in the middle of a rocky field.

== History ==
The history of the castle complex dates back to the pre-Islamic era of Iran. Izad-Khast is a castle built during the Sasanian Empire (224 to 651 AD) which ruled Iran (Persia) and many parts of the surrounding countries. It was then used, added and improved on until the Qajar era (1794 to 1925). This has left works inside the castle belonging to different eras from the Sasanians to the Qajars with different architectural styles.

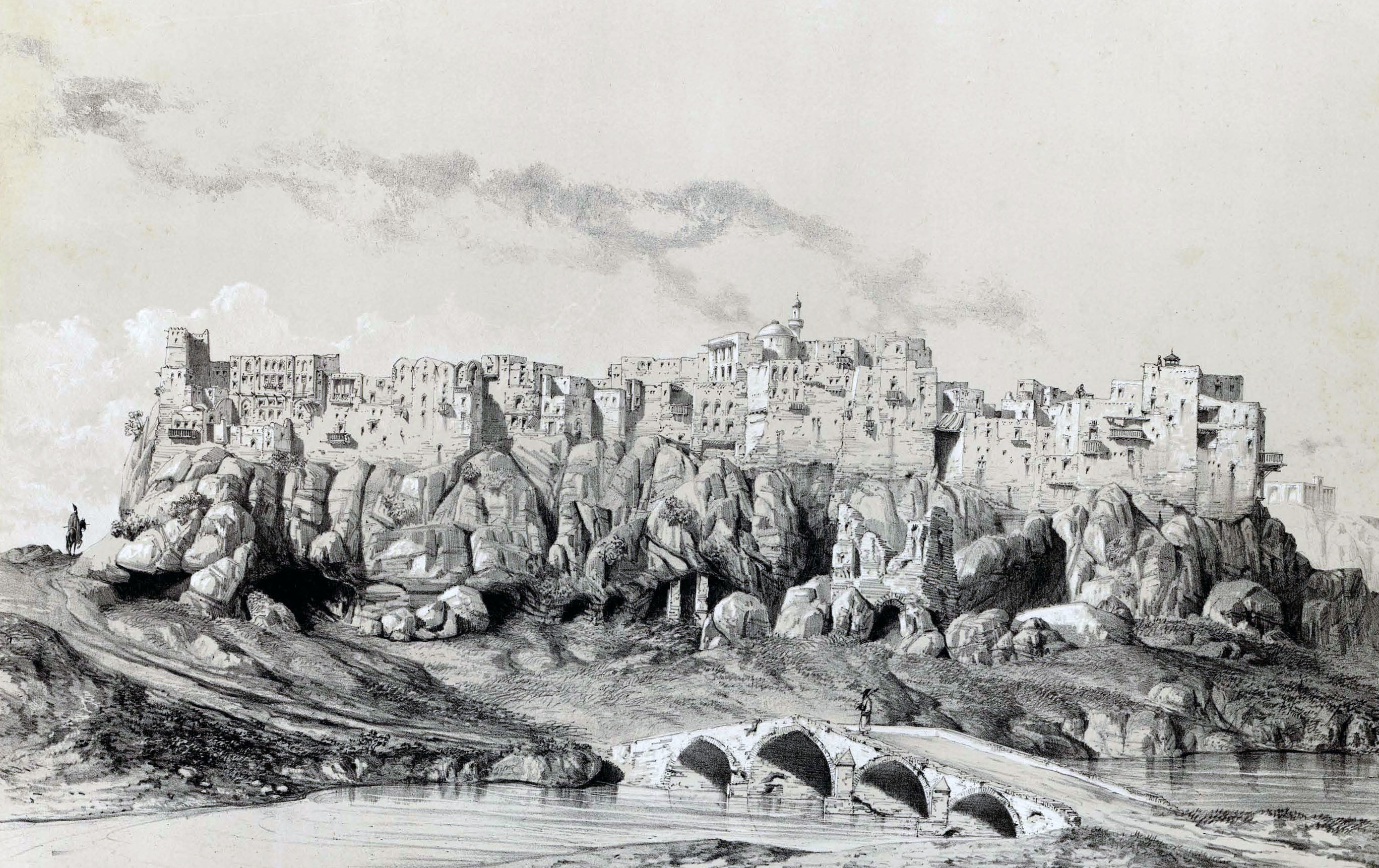
Drawing by Eugène Flandin, 1840

The fire temple of Izad Khast Castle from the Sasanian era was turned into a mosque after the advent of Islam to Iran.

The castle and complex are now completely abandoned. However, until the turn of the millennium there were still people living in the old quarters of Izadkhast. Floods in recent years destroyed many homes and forced people to move from this isolated, ancient desert citadel.

In 1889, Theodore Bent and his wife celebrated Nowruz in the town.

== Architecture ==
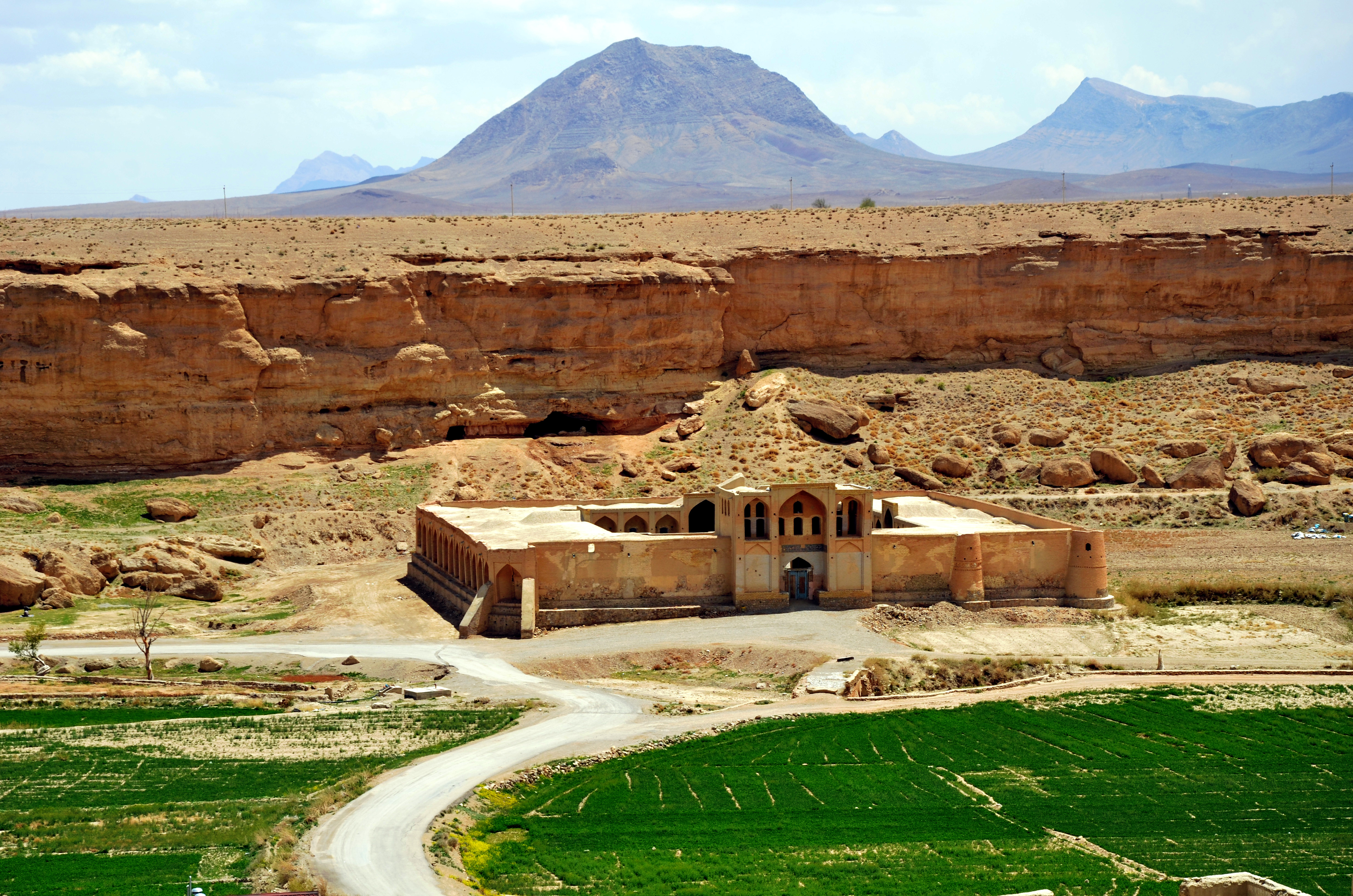
View of Izadkhast Caravanserai from the castle.

The castle's location and form of construction display unique characteristics. However, its materials are comparable to those found in nearby sites in Yazd and Kerman provinces such as Arg-e Bam and Rayen Castle. The architecture of Izadkhast castle is very similar to the more feted Arg-e Bam. The Izad-Khast castle like Arg-e Bam is a sand construction, made of adobe.

The castle is a Sasanian (224 to 651 AD) structure, but the interior has seen modifications and new structures such as a mosque and a bathroom were added later.

Most of the homes in the castle interior are built from wood and mud. Size limitations of the bedrock led to an agglomeration of smaller rooms and increase of floors. Some of the buildings inside the castle rose as high as five storeys. It is impressive in itself but becomes a remarkable architectural achievement considering the circumstances of its time.

The Izadkhast Caravanserai was built during the Safavid era (1502 – 1736).

== Threats ==
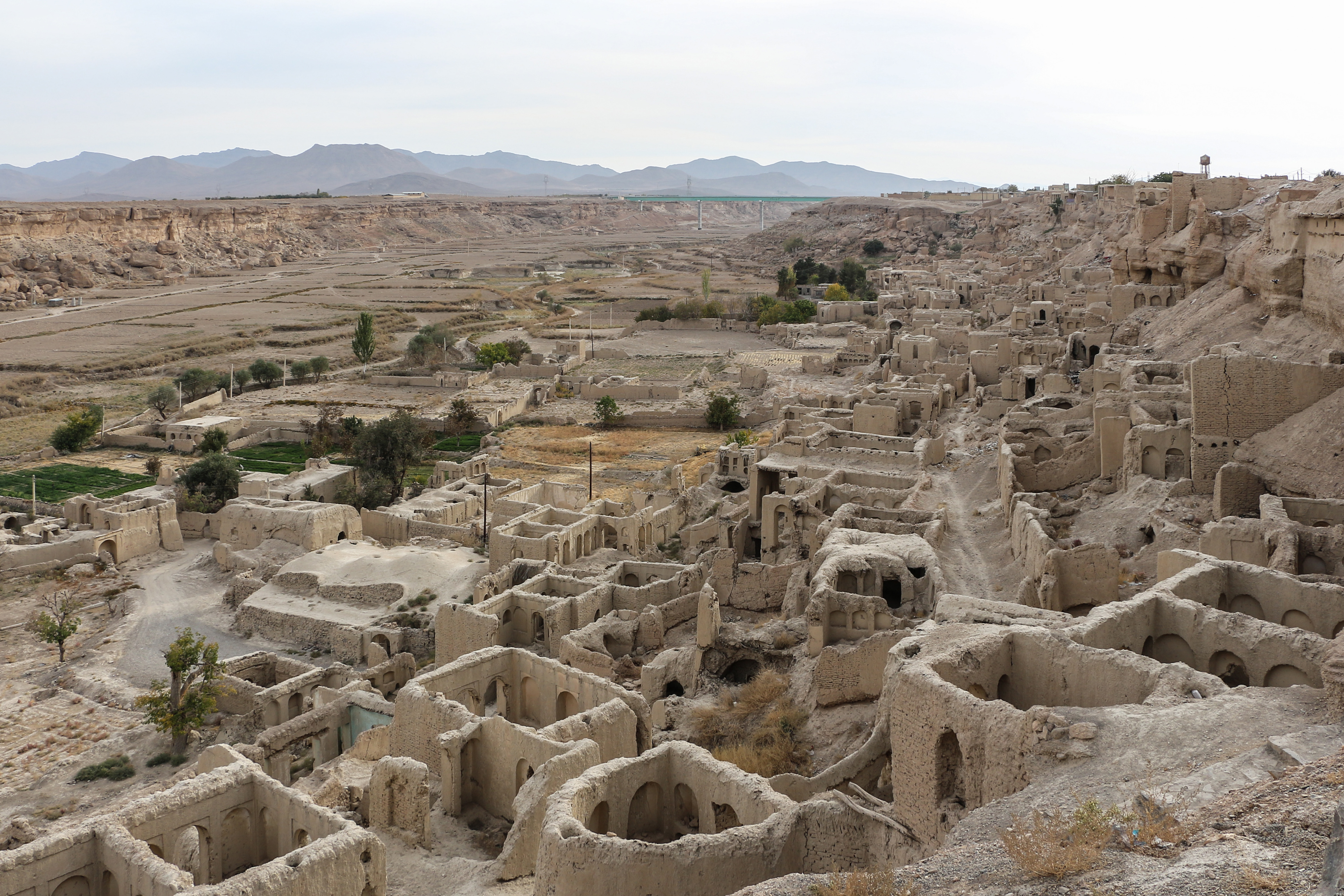
Crumbling ruins of the old castle town

Many parts of the Izadkhast castle are crumbling due to erosion and flooding. Many homes even beside the castle front gate have been completely destroyed.

The castle is also in danger from treasure hunters and vandalism. Inside the walled city, there are signs of damage from treasure hunters and graffiti on the walls.

== Gallery ==
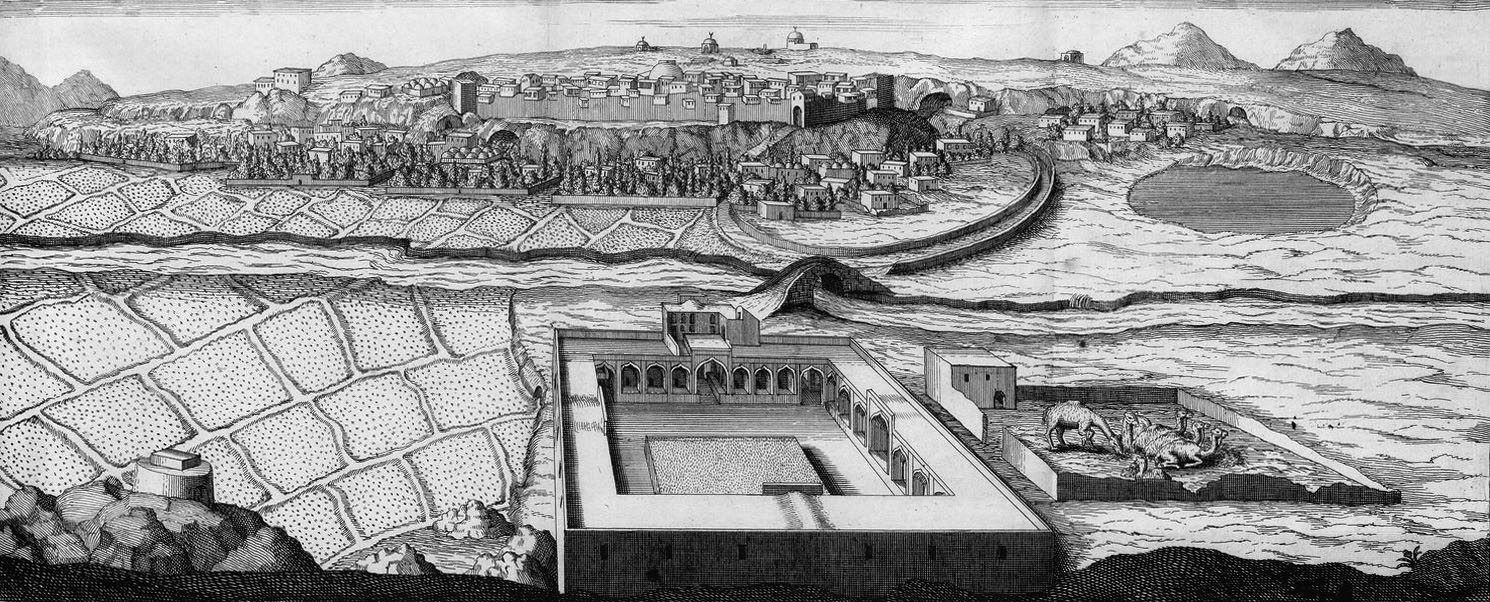
Drawing by Jean Chardin, 1670s

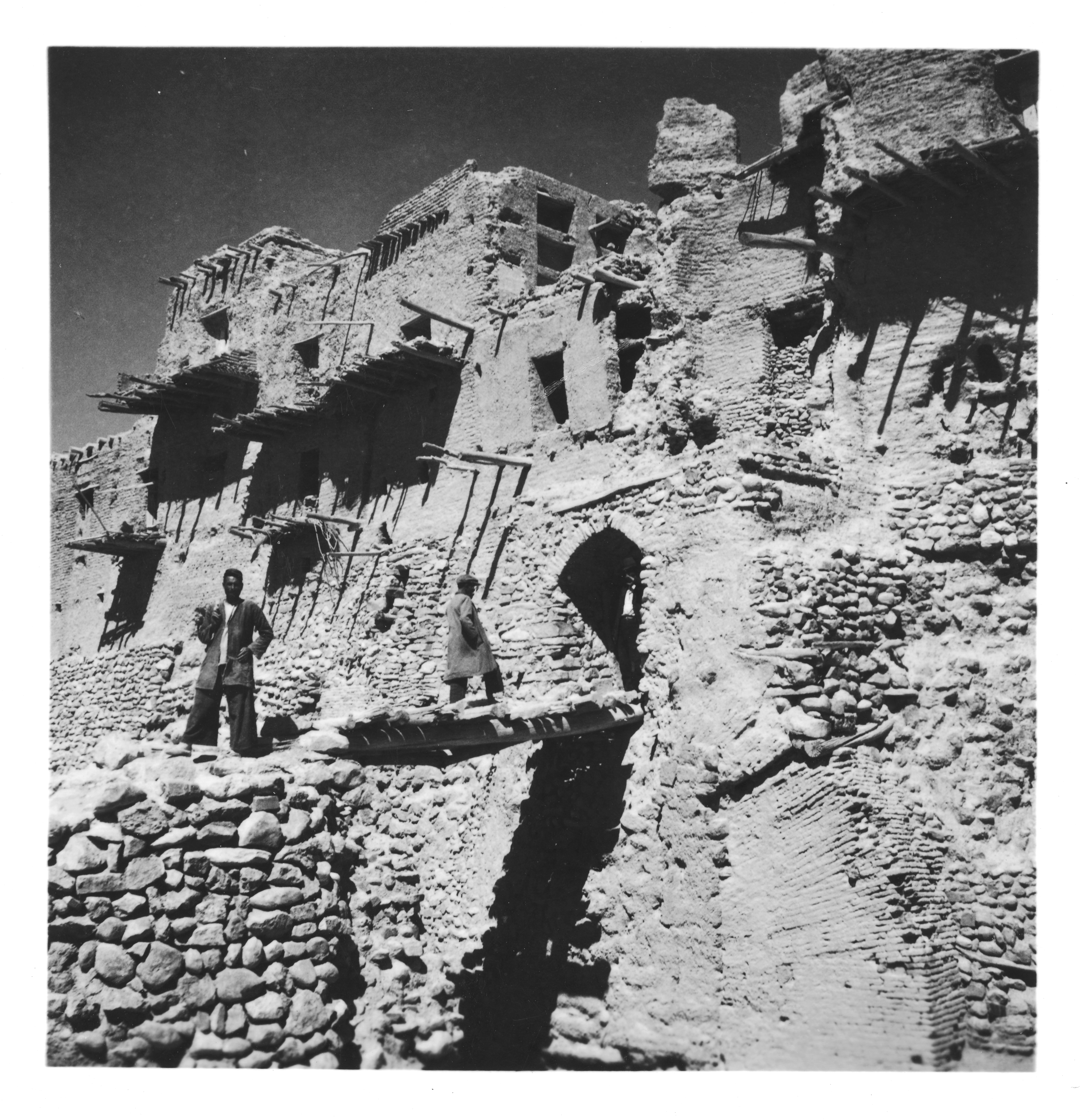
Phitograph, eraly 20th century

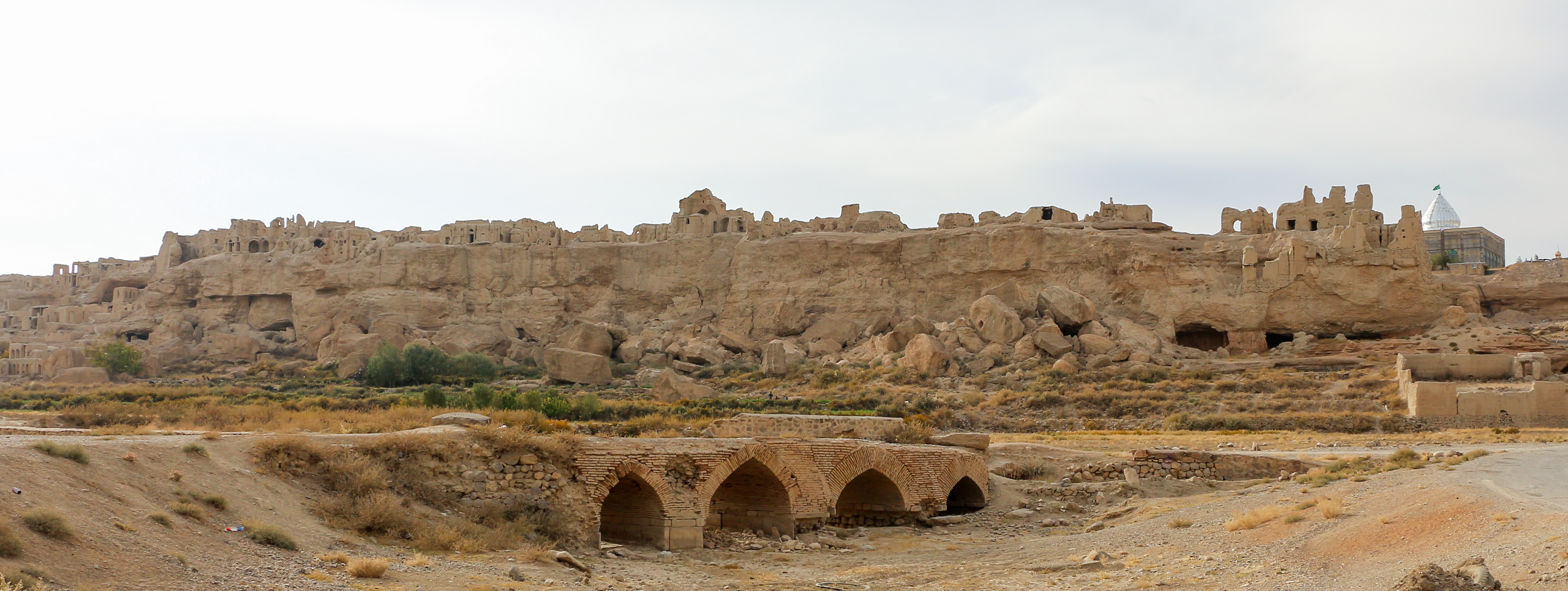

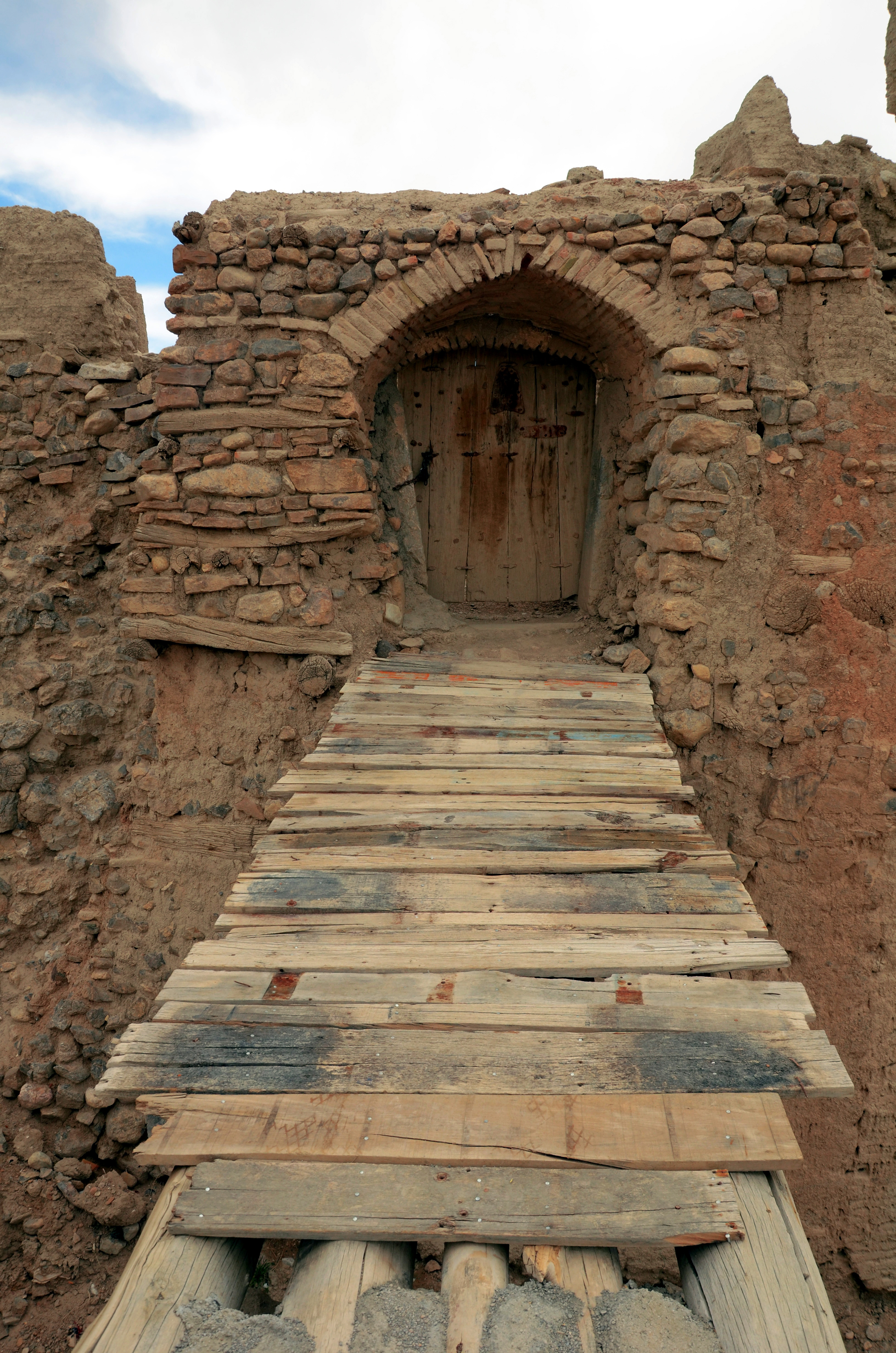
Entrance of the castle.

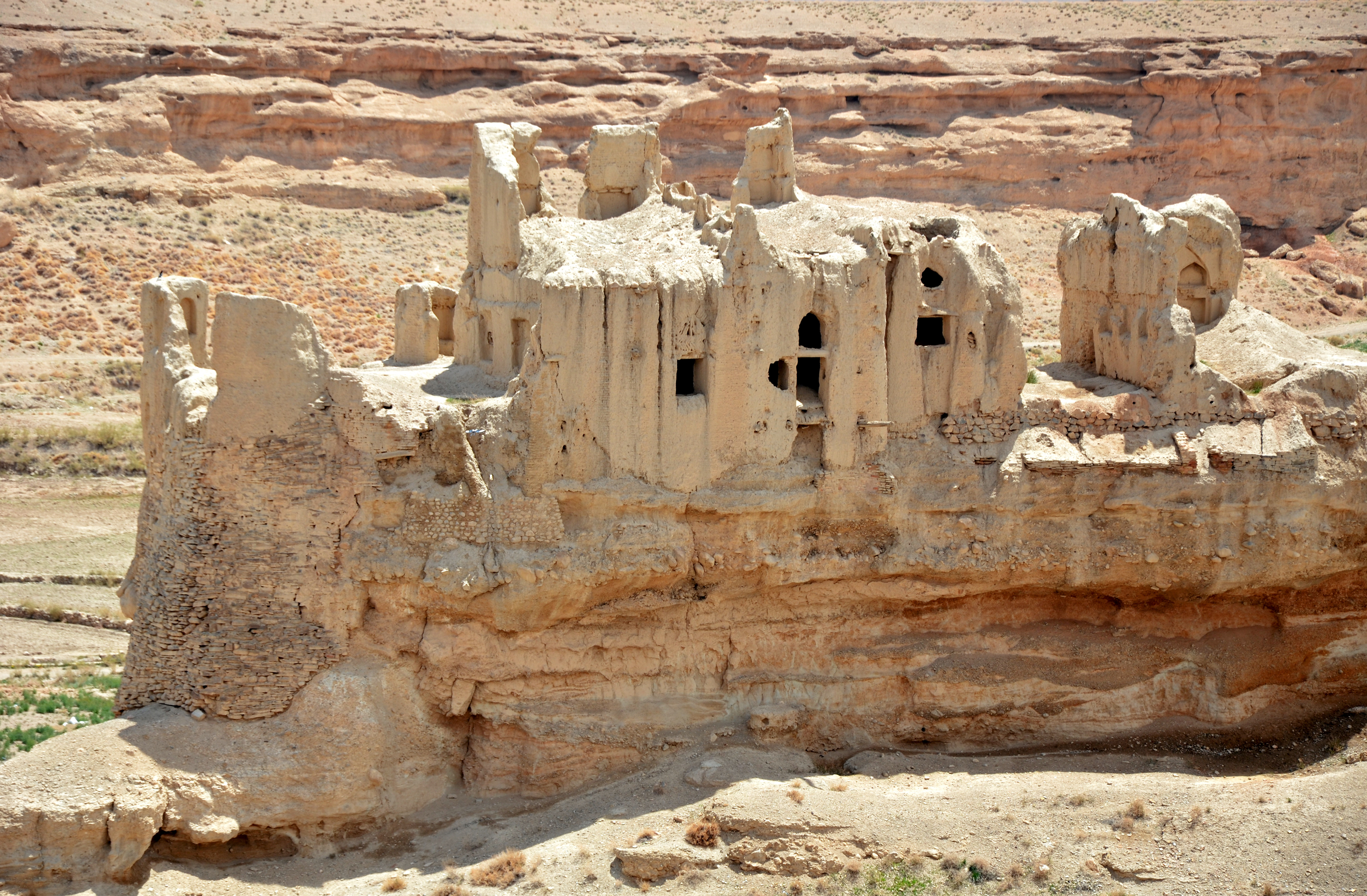
part of the old castle.

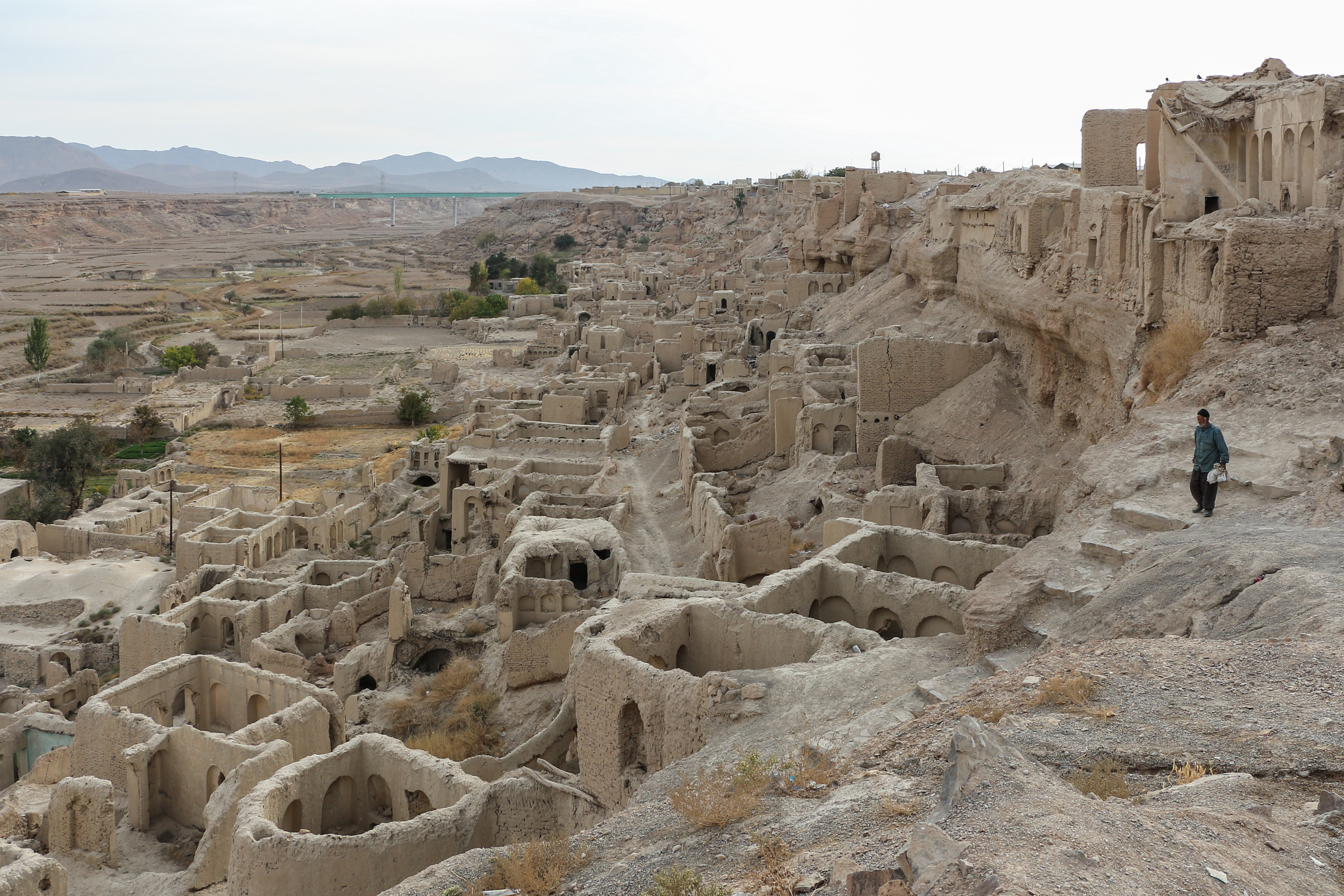
Ruins of the old town

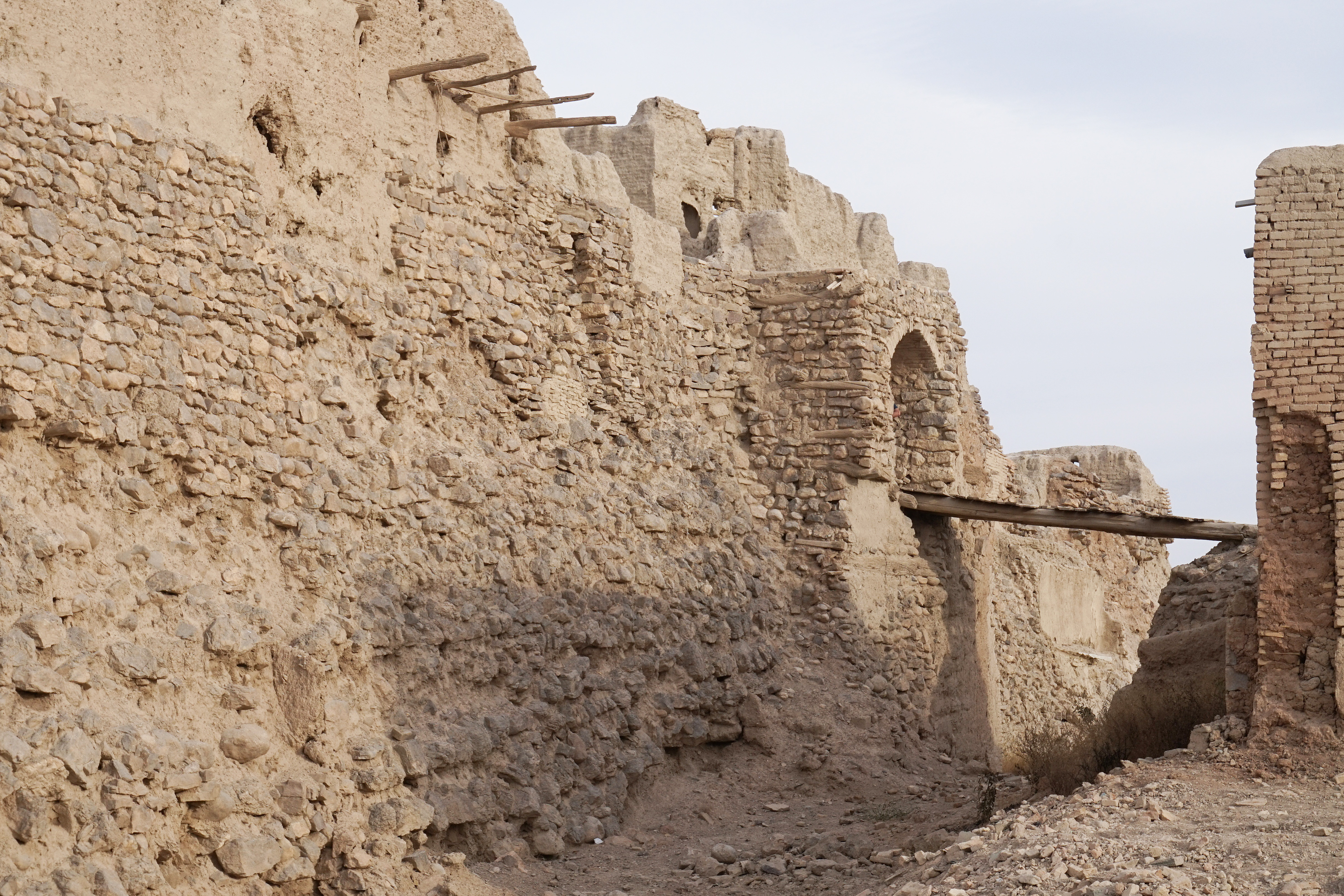
The drawbridge of the castle

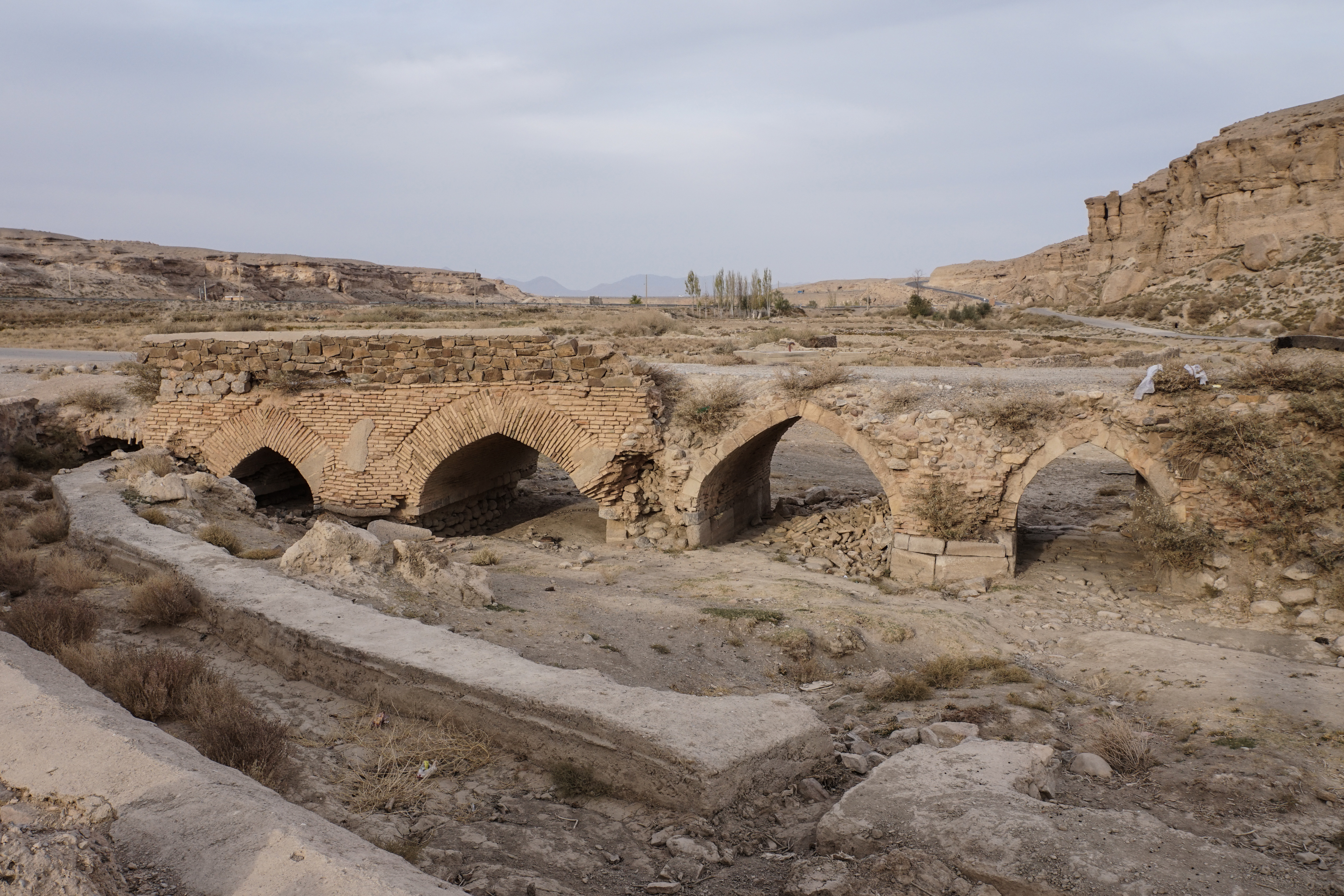
Safavid era bridge

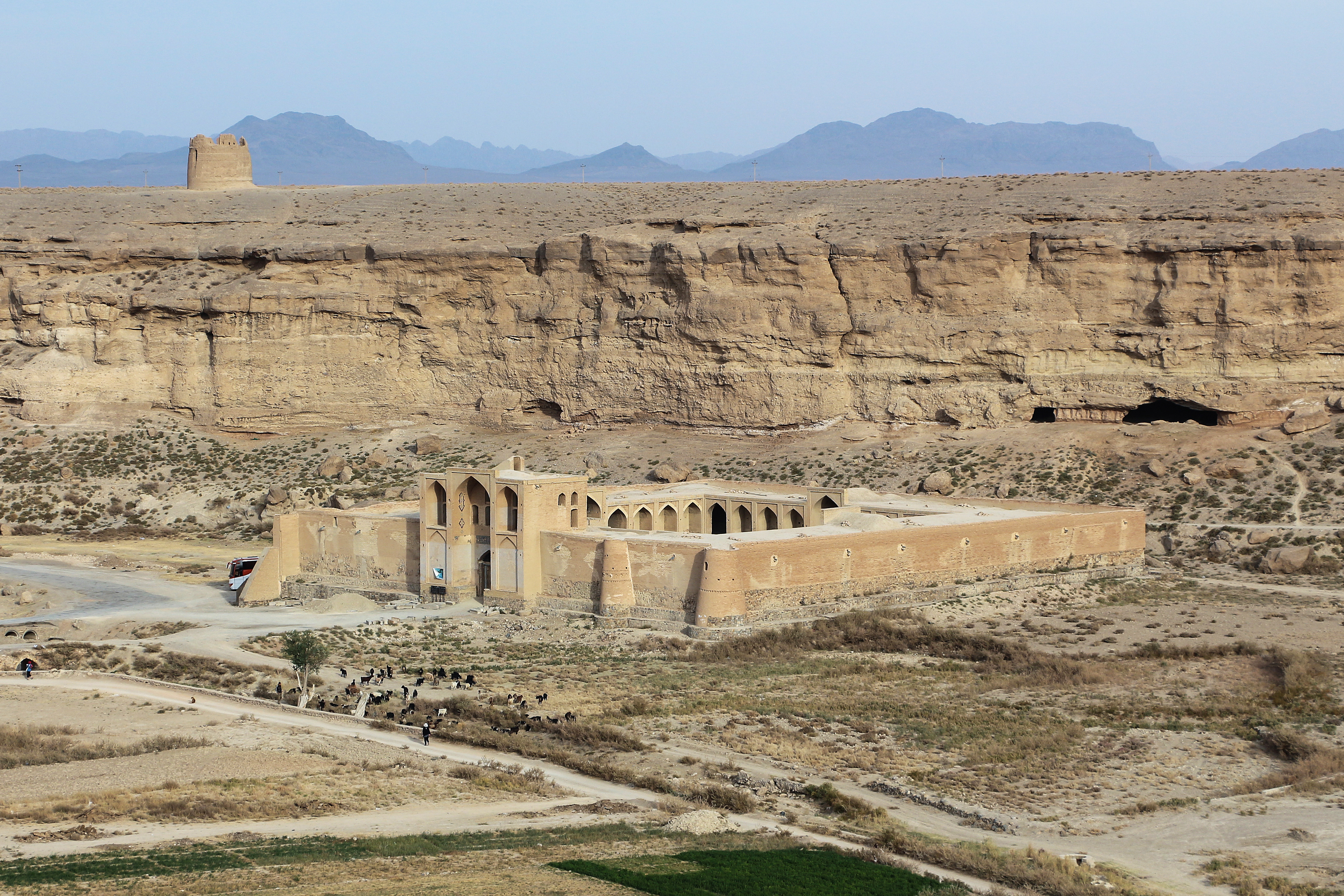
Samanid caravanserai near the castle of Izadkhast.

== See also ==
- Complex of Izadkhast
- Izadkhast Caravanserai
- List of castles in Iran
- List of World Heritage Sites in Iran
