= Izadkhast =

City in Fars province, Iran

Izadkhast Persian: ايزدخواست
- City
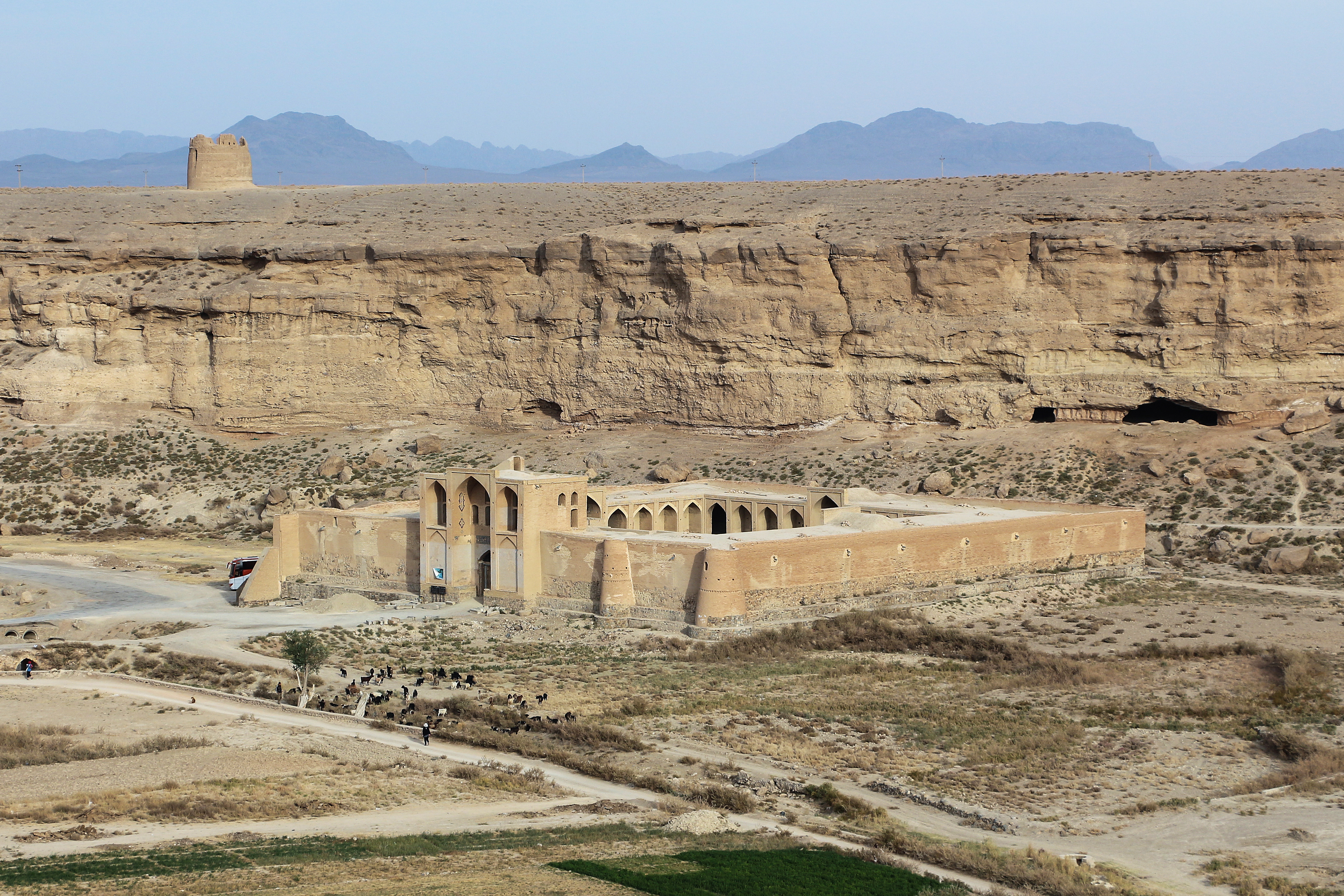
- Samanid caravanserai in Izadkhast.

- Location within Iran
- Coordinates: 31°31′08″N 52°07′32″E
- Country: Iran
- Province: Fars
- County: Abadeh
- District: Central

Population (2016)
  - Total: 5,910
- Time zone: UTC+3:30 (IRST)
- Area code: 0752-226

Izadkhast (Persian: ايزدخواست) (Note: Also romanized as Īzad Khvast and Īzadkhvāst; also known as Īzad Khast, Samīrum, Yazd-e Khāst, Yazd-e Khvāst, and Yezd-i-Khast) is a city in the Central District of Abadeh County, Fars province, Iran, and serves as the administrative center for Izadkhast Rural District. It is the first city in Fars on the Isfahan-Shiraz Highway.

== History ==
In 1779 Zaki Khan of the Zand dynasty committed such atrocities here that his own men decided to murder him.

== Demographics ==
=== Population ===
At the time of the 2006 National Census, the city's population was 7,366 in 1,803 households. The following census in 2011 counted 6,532 people in 1,920 households. The 2016 census measured the population of the city as 5,910 people in 1,834 households.

== Izadkhast Complex ==
=== Historical monuments ===
The Complex of Izadkhast is roughly 135 km south of Isfahan. The complex consists of Izad-Khast Castle, a caravanserai, and a Safavid-period bridge. The castle structure is of particular interest due to the different architectural styles incorporated into the construction of the building, including Sassanid and Qajar periods. The architecture of the castle is unique to Izadkhast, and only comparisons in building materials can be made to other sites in the region.

=== World Heritage status ===
This site was added to the UNESCO World Heritage Tentative List on 9 August 2007, in the Cultural category.

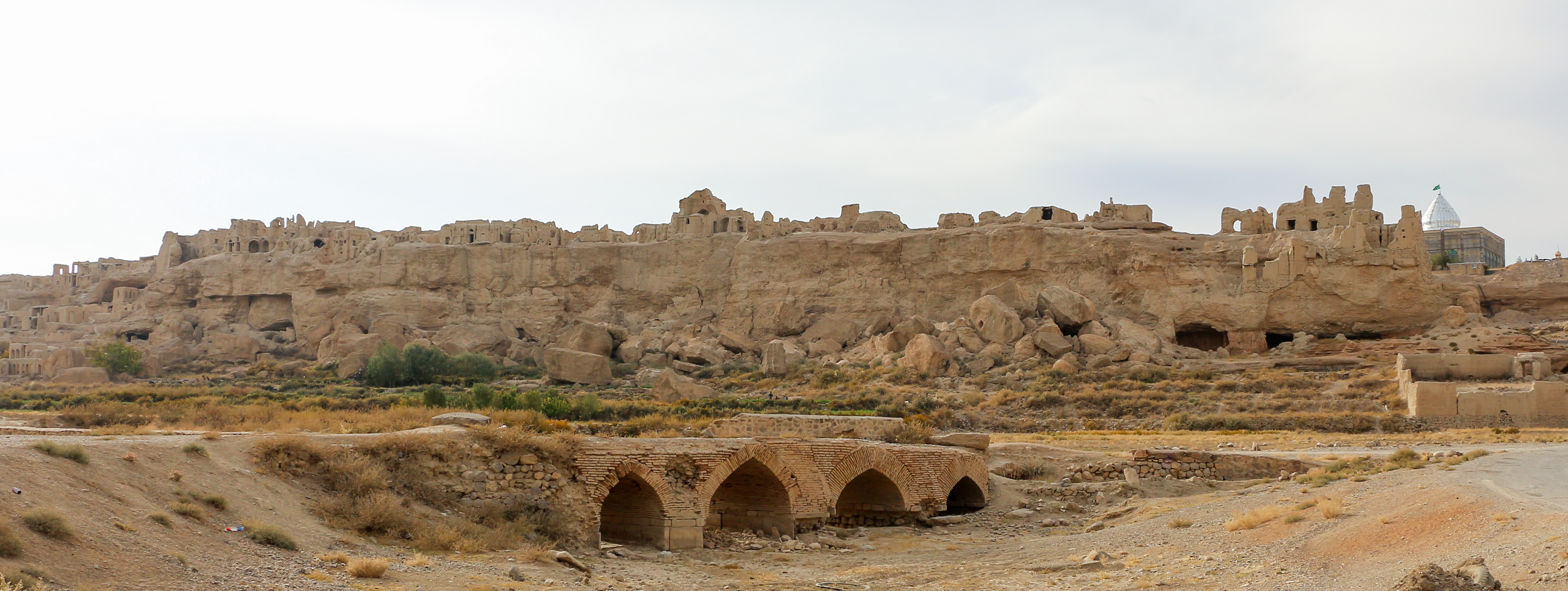
Izadkhast Castle

== Gallery ==
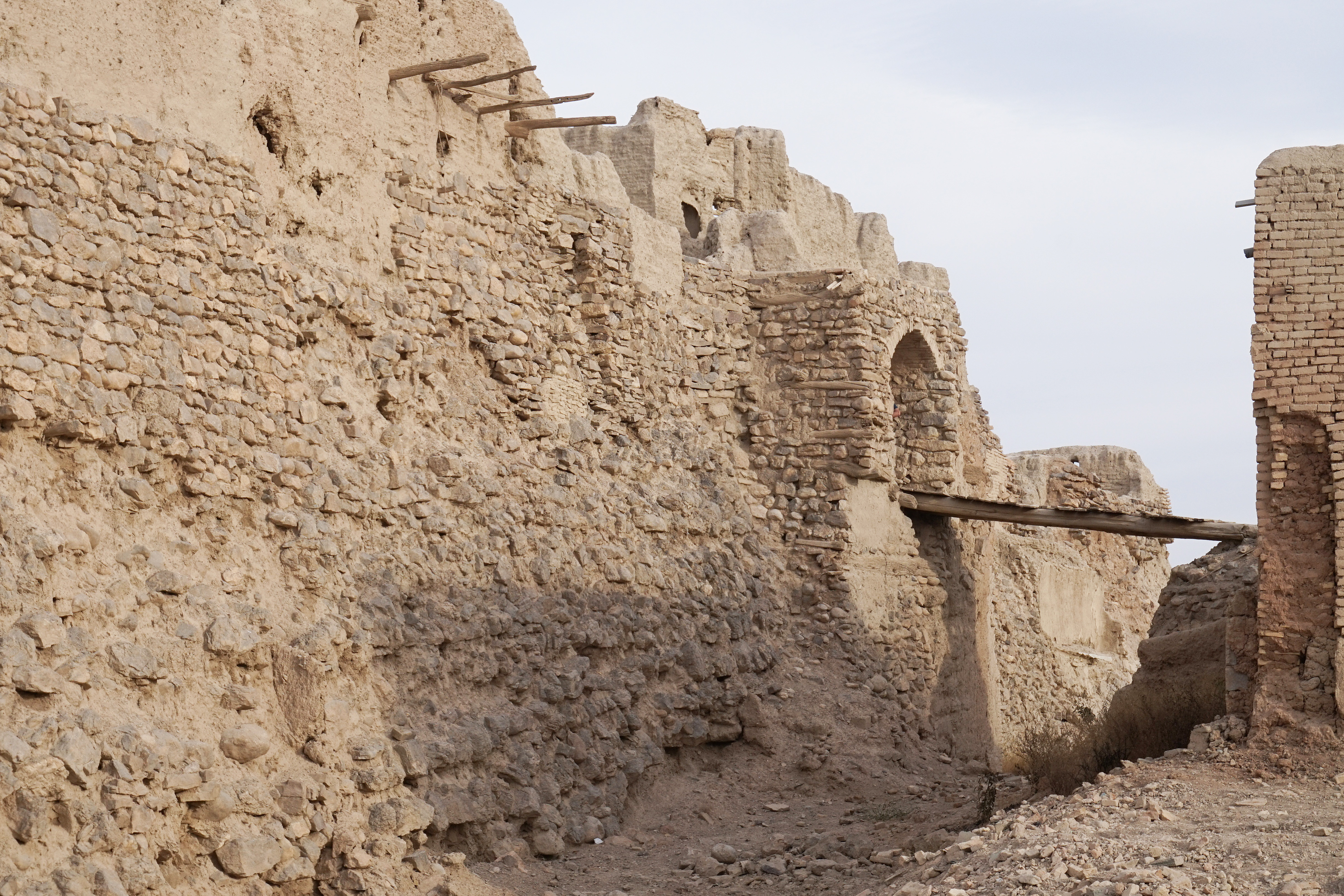
Drawbridge of the castle

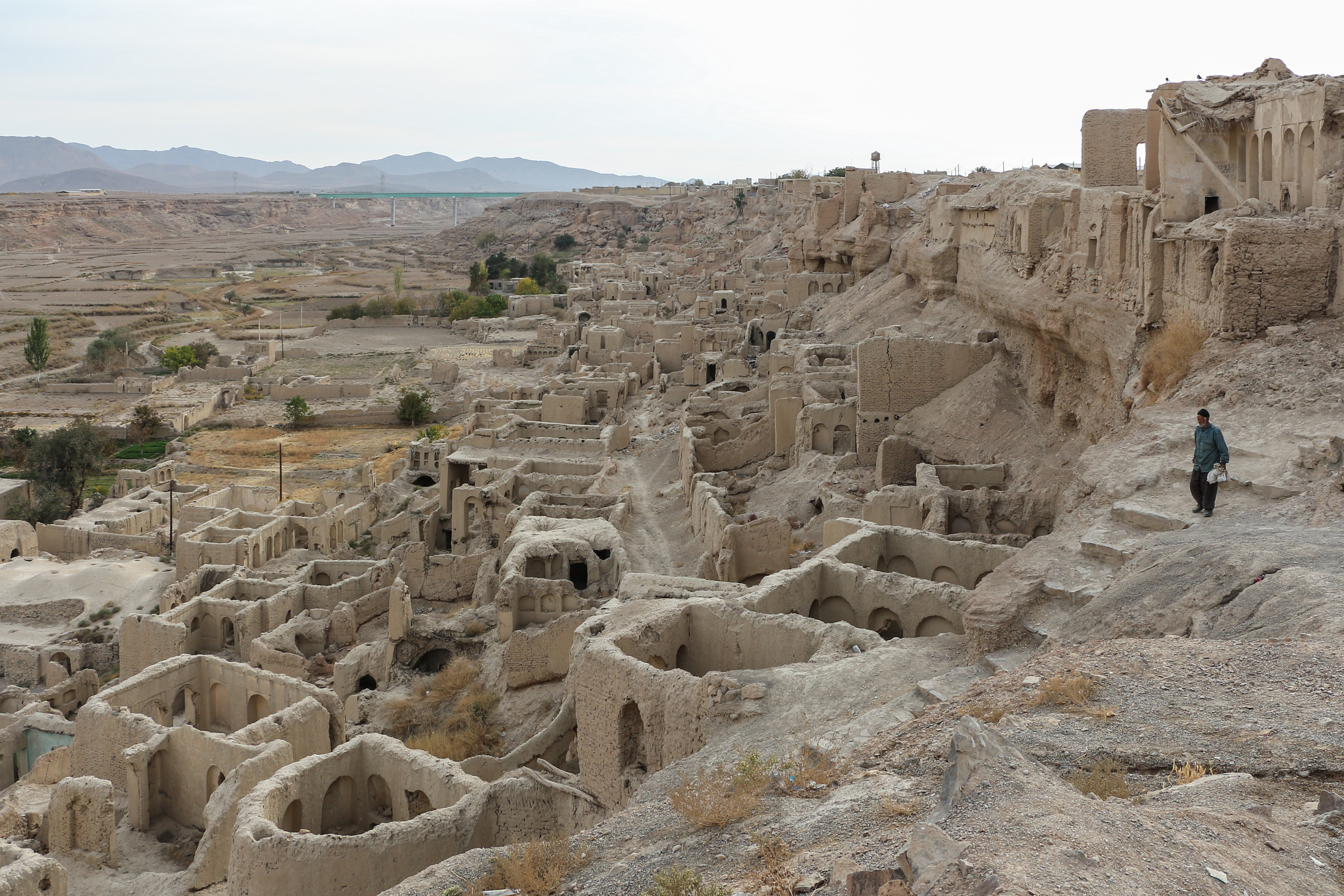
Ruins of the old town

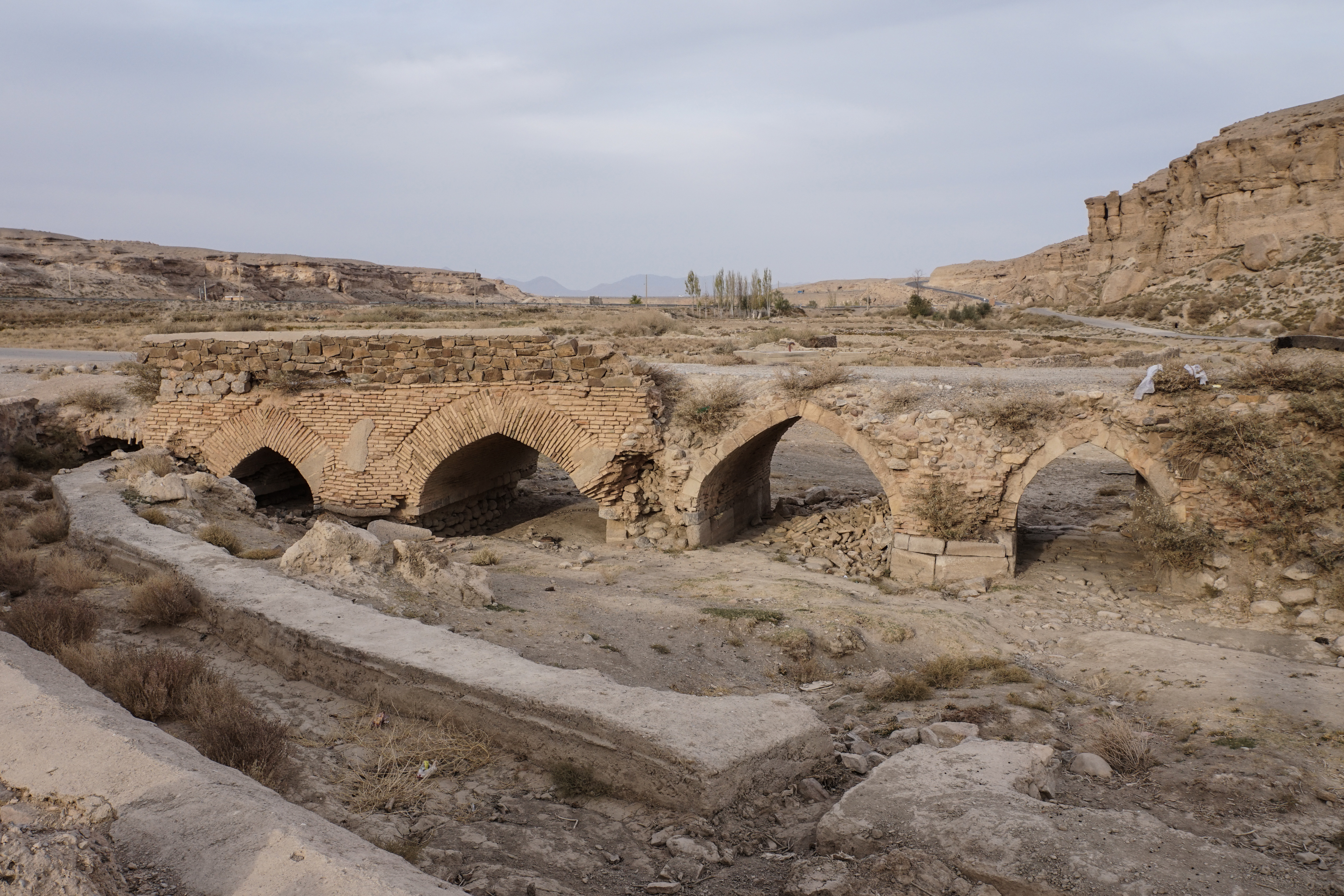
Safavid-period bridge

== See also ==
Media related to Izadkhast at Wikimedia Commons
