= Najafabad (disambiguation) =

Najafabad is a city in Isfahan Province, Iran.

Najafabad (Persian: نجف‌آباد) may also refer to:

== Fars Province ==
- Najafabad, Abadeh, a village in Abadeh County
- Najafabad, Arsanjan, a village in Arsanjan County
- Najafabad, Firuzabad, a village in Firuzabad County
- Najafabad, Meymand, a village in Firuzabad County
- Najafabad, Larestan, a village in Larestan County
- Najafabad, Pasargad, a village in Pasargad County
- Najafabad, Qir and Karzin, a village in Qir and Karzin County

== Hamadan Province ==
- Najafabad, Asadabad, a village in Asadabad County
- Najafabad, Tuyserkan, a village in Tuyserkan County

== Hormozgan Province ==
- Najafabad, Hormozgan, a village in Hajjiabad County

== Isfahan Province ==
- Najafabad, Nain, a village in Nain County
- Najafabad, a city in Najafabad County
- Najafabad, Semirom, a village in Semirom County
- Najafabad, alternate name of Aghdash, Isfahan, a village in Semirom County
- Najafabad County, an administrative subdivision of Iran

== Kerman Province ==
- Najafabad, former name of Najaf Shahr, a city in Kerman Province, Iran
- Najafabad, Jiroft, a village in Jiroft County
- Najafabad, Kuhbanan, a village in Kuhbanan County
- Najafabad Rural District (Kerman Province), in Sirjan County

== Kermanshah Province ==
- Najafabad, Kermanshah, a village in Kermanshah County
- Najafabad, Sonqor, a village in Sonqor County

== Kohgiluyeh and Boyer-Ahmad Province ==
- Najafabad, Kohgiluyeh and Boyer-Ahmad, a village in Boyer-Ahmad County

== Kurdistan Province ==
- Najafabad, Bijar, a village in Bijar County
- Najafabad, Kamyaran, a village in Kamyaran County
- Najafabad, Qorveh, a village in Qorveh County
- Najafabad Rural District (Kurdistan Province), in Bijar County

== Lorestan Province ==
- Najafabad, Aligudarz, a village in Aligudarz County
- Najafabad, Khorramabad, a village in Khorramabad County

== Markazi Province ==
- Najafabad, Ashtian, a village in Ashtian County
- Najafabad, Shazand, a village in Shazand County
- Najafabad, Zarandieh, a village in Zarandieh County
- Najafabad, alternate name of Soheyl Najafabad, a village in Zarandieh County

== North Khorasan Province ==
- Najafabad, Bojnord, a village in Bojnord County
- Najafabad, Faruj, a village in Faruj County

== Qazvin Province ==
- Najafabad, Buin Zahra, a village in Buin Zahra County
- Najafabad, Qazvin, a village in Qazvin County
- Najafabad, Tarom Sofla, a village in Qazvin County

== Razavi Khorasan Province ==
- Najafabad, Dargaz, a village in Dargaz County
- Najafabad, Firuzeh, a village in Firuzeh County

== Tehran Province ==
- Najafabad, Tehran, a village in Varamin County

== West Azerbaijan Province ==
- Najafabad, West Azerbaijan, a village in Urmia County

== Yazd Province ==
- Najafabad, Yazd, a village in Taft County

== See also ==
- Najafabad Rural District (disambiguation)
