= Deh-e Bala =

Deh-e Bala or Deh Bala or Dehbala (Persian: ده بالا) may refer to:

== Afghanistan ==
- Deh Bala, Afghanistan

== Iran ==
- Deh-e Bala, Abadeh, Fars Province
- Deh-e Bala, Mohr, Fars Province
- Deh-e Bala, Kerman
- Deh-e Bala, Bardsir, Kerman Province
- Deh-e Bala, Qaleh Ganj, Kerman Province
- Deh-e Bala, Rafsanjan, Kerman Province
- Deh Bala, Sirjan, Kerman Province
- Deh Bala, Nuq, Rafsanjan County, Kerman Province
- Deh-e Bala, Rudbar-e Jonubi, Kerman Province
- Deh-e Bala, Shahr-e Babak, Kerman Province
- Deh Bala, Sirjan, Kerman Province
- Deh-e Bala, Zarand, Kerman Province
- Deh Bala, Kermanshah
- Deh Bala, Sonqor, Kermanshah Province
- Deh-e Bala, Nukabad, Khash County, Sistan and Baluchestan Province
