= Yaqubabad =

Yaqubabad (Persian: يعقوب اباد) may refer to:

- Jacobabad, Sindh, Pakistan
- Yaqubabad, Karachi, Karachi, Sindh, Pakistan
- Yaqubabad, Alborz, Iran
- Yaqubabad, Fars, Iran
- Yaqubabad, Kurdistan, Iran
- Yaqubabad, Hamadan, Iran
- Yaqubabad, Kerman, Iran
- Yaqubabad, Abyek, Qazvin Province, Iran
- Yaqubabad, Buin Zahra, Qazvin Province, Iran
- Yaqubabad, Razavi Khorasan, Iran
