= Firuzi =

Firuzi (Persian: فيروزي) may refer to:

- Firuzi, Abadeh, Fars Province
- Firuzi, Bavanat, Fars Province
- Firuzi, Khorrambid, Fars Province
- Firuzi, Marvdasht, Fars Province
- Firuzi, Shiraz, Fars Province
- Firuzi, Razavi Khorasan
