= Mohammadabad, Abadeh =

Village in Fars province, Iran

Mohammadabad Persian: محمداباد
- Village
- Location within Iran
- Coordinates: 30°50′32″N 52°01′17″E
- Country: Iran
- Province: Fars
- County: Abadeh
- District: Bahman and Soghad
- Rural District: Khosrow Shirin

Population (2016)
  - Total: 884
- Time zone: UTC+3:30 (IRST)
- Website: khosrowshirin.ir

Mohammadabad (Persian: محمداباد) (Note: Also romanized as Moḩammadābād) is a village in Khosrow Shirin Rural District of Bahman and Soghad District, Abadeh County, Fars province, Iran.

== Demographics ==
=== Population ===
At the time of the 2006 National Census, the village's population was 849 in 177 households, when it was in the Central District of Eqlid County. The following census in 2011 counted 854 people in 226 households, by which time the rural district had been separated from the county to join the Central District of Abadeh County. The 2016 census measured the population of the village as 884 people in 243 households.

In 2018, the rural district was separated from the district in the establishment of Bahman and Soghad District.
