= Eqbalabad =

Eqbalabad (Persian: اقبال اباد) may refer to:

- Eqbalabad, Eqlid, Fars Province
- Eqbalabad, Jahrom, Fars Province
- Eqbalabad, Shiraz, Fars Province
- Eqbalabad, Kohgiluyeh and Boyer-Ahmad
- Eqbalabad, Yazd
