= Khosrow Shirin =

Village in Fars province, Iran

Khosrow Shirin Persian: خسرو شيرين
- Village
- Location within Iran
- Coordinates: 30°53′54″N 52°00′08″E
- Country: Iran
- Province: Fars
- County: Abadeh
- District: Bahman and Soghad
- Rural District: Khosrow Shirin

Population (2016)
  - Total: 1,969
- Time zone: UTC+3:30 (IRST)
- Website: khosrowshirin.ir

Khosrow Shirin (Persian: خسرو شيرين) (Note: Also romanized as Khosrow Shīrīn; also known as Kūh-i-Khusru and Shirin) is a village in, and the capital of, Khosrow Shirin Rural District of Bahman and Soghad District, Abadeh County, Fars province, Iran. The nomads from southern parts of the province migrate to Khosrow Shirin to spend the summer.

== Demographics ==
=== Language ===
People of the village have a Persian accent, which is most similar to the Lori Dialect.

=== Population ===
At the time of the 2006 National Census, the village's population was 1,835 in 503 households, when it was in the Central District of Eqlid County. The following census in 2011 counted 2,069 people in 595 households, by which time the rural district had been separated from the county to join the Central District of Abadeh County. The 2016 census measured the population of the village as 1,969 people in 607 households. It was the most populous village in its rural district.

In July 2018, the rural district was separated from the district in the establishment of Bahman and Soghad District.

== Climate ==
The village has a cold climate and the average rainfall in the area is about 400 millimeters per year.
