= Heshmatiyeh, Fars =

Village in Fars province, Iran

Heshmatiyeh Persian: حشمتيه
- Village
- Location within Iran
- Coordinates: 31°09′10″N 52°35′18″E
- Country: Iran
- Province: Fars
- County: Abadeh
- District: Bahman and Soghad
- Rural District: Bahman

Population (2016)
  - Total: 2,868
- Time zone: UTC+3:30 (IRST)

Heshmatiyeh (Persian: حشمتيه) (Note: Also romanized as Ḩeshmatīyeh; also known as Kooshkak and Kūshkak) is a village in Bahman Rural District of Bahman and Soghad District, Abadeh County, Fars province, Iran.

== Demographics ==
=== Population ===
At the time of the 2006 National Census, the village's population was 1,095 in 242 households, when it was in the Central District. The following census in 2011 counted 2,427 people in 635 households. The 2016 census measured the population of the village as 2,868 people in 784 households. It was the most populous village in its rural district.

In 2018, the rural district was separated from the district in the establishment of Bahman and Soghad District.
