= Abadeh Airport =

- IATA: none; ICAO: OISA

Summary
- Airport type: Public
- Serves: Abadeh, Fars province, Iran
- Elevation AMSL: 6,394 ft / 1,949 m
- Coordinates: 31°1′54″N 52°47′23″E

Map
- Location of airport in Iran

Runways
Direction	Length		Surface
Direction	ft	m	Surface
12/30	6,578	2,005

Abadeh Airport (Persian: فرودگاه آباده – Farūdegāh-e Ābāde) (ICAO: OISA) is an airport near Abadeh, Fars province, Iran. The airport is intended to serve the greater Northern Fars Region, including the counties of Abadeh, Eghlid, and Abarkuh.

The Airport is located in Bidak Rural District, Abadeh County, Fars, accessible via a gravel road branching off at Amirabad, from Abadeh-Shiraz Expressway.
