= Takht-e Rud =

Takht-e Rud تخت رود
- Village
- Location within Iran
- Coordinates: 31°02′43″N 52°51′06″E
- Country: Iran
- Province: Fars
- County: Abadeh
- Bakhsh: Central
- Rural District: Surmaq

Population (2006)
  - Total: 20
- Time zone: UTC+3:30 (IRST)
  - Summer (DST): UTC+4:30 (IRDT)

Takht-e Rud (Persian: تخت رود, also Romanized as Takht-e Rūd and Takht Rūd; also known as Tahtarun, Taḩt-e Rūd, That Rood, and Taḩt Rūd) is a village in Surmaq Rural District, in the Central District of Abadeh County, Fars province, Iran. At the 2006 census, its population was 20, comprising six families.
