= Shurjestan =

Shurjestan شورجستان
- Village
- Location within Iran
- Coordinates: 31°22′35″N 52°25′35″E
- Country: Iran
- Province: Fars
- County: Abadeh
- Bakhsh: Central
- Rural District: Bahman

Population (2006)
  - Total: 618
- Time zone: UTC+3:30 (IRST)
  - Summer (DST): UTC+4:30 (IRDT)

Shurjestan (Persian: شورجستان, also Romanized as Shūrjestān; also known as Shūlgistan, Shūljestān, and Shūlqestān) is a village in Bahman Rural District, in the Central District of Abadeh County, Fars province, Iran. At the 2006 census, its population was 618, in 187 families.
