= Dehdaq =

Dehdaq دهدق
- Village
- Location within Iran
- Coordinates: 31°08′08″N 52°42′00″E
- Country: Iran
- Province: Fars
- County: Abadeh
- Bakhsh: Central
- Rural District: Bidak

Population (2006)
  - Total: 746
- Time zone: UTC+3:30 (IRST)
  - Summer (DST): UTC+4:30 (IRDT)

Dehdaq (Persian: دهدق, also Romanized as Deh Daq; also known as Dāhdak, Dehdagh, and Dehdak) is a village in Bidak Rural District, in the Central District of Abadeh County, Fars province, Iran. At the 2006 census, its population was 746, in 204 families.
