= Dasht-e Beyza =

Dasht-e Beyza دشت بيضا
- Village
- Location within Iran
- Coordinates: 31°02′47″N 52°50′56″E
- Country: Iran
- Province: Fars
- County: Abadeh
- Bakhsh: Central
- Rural District: Surmaq

Population (2006)
  - Total: 48
- Time zone: UTC+3:30 (IRST)
  - Summer (DST): UTC+4:30 (IRDT)

Dasht-e Beyza (Persian: دشت بيضا, also Romanized as Dasht-e Beyẕā; also known as Dasht Ebiza) is a village in Surmaq Rural District, in the Central District of Abadeh County, Fars province, Iran. At the 2006 census, its population was 48, in 18 families.
