= Gowd Ab Ashtar =

Gowd Ab Ashtar گودآب اشتر
- Village
- Country: Iran
- Province: Fars
- County: Abadeh
- Bakhsh: Central
- Rural District: Bahman

Population (2006)
  - Total: 10
- Time zone: UTC+3:30 (IRST)
  - Summer (DST): UTC+4:30 (IRDT)

Gowd Ab Ashtar (Persian: گودآب اشتر, also Romanized as Gowd Āb Āshtar) is a village in Bahman Rural District, in the Central District of Abadeh County, Fars province, Iran. At the 2006 census, its population was 10, in 5 families.
