= Kord-e Shul =

Kord-e Shul or Kord Shul (Persian: كردشول), also rendered as Kurd Shul, may refer to:

- Kordshuli tribe in Fars province of Iran
- Kord Shul, Eqlid
- Kord-e Shul, Pasargad
- Kord Shul, Qir and Karzin
