= Sehqalat =

Sehqalat سه قلات
- Village
- Location within Iran
- Coordinates: 30°37′47″N 52°34′09″E
- Country: Iran
- Province: Fars
- County: Eqlid
- Bakhsh: Central
- Rural District: Khonjesht

Population (2006)
  - Total: 178
- Time zone: UTC+3:30 (IRST)
  - Summer (DST): UTC+4:30 (IRDT)

Sehqalat (Persian: سه قلات, also Romanized as Sehqalāt) is a village in Khonjesht Rural District, in the Central District of Eqlid County, Fars province, Iran. At the 2006 census, its population was 178, in 41 families.
