= Senjed Gol =

Senjed Gol سنجدگل
- Village
- Location within Iran
- Coordinates: 31°01′41″N 52°21′53″E
- Country: Iran
- Province: Fars
- County: Eqlid
- Bakhsh: Central
- Rural District: Shahr Meyan

Population (2006)
  - Total: 37
- Time zone: UTC+3:30 (IRST)
  - Summer (DST): UTC+4:30 (IRDT)

Senjed Gol (Persian: سنجدگل) is a village in Shahr Meyan Rural District, in the Central District of Eqlid County, Fars province, Iran. At the 2006 census, its population was 37, from 7 families.
