= Baz Bachcheh =

Baz Bachcheh بازبچه
- Village
- Location within Iran
- Coordinates: 30°54′37″N 52°27′08″E
- Country: Iran
- Province: Fars
- County: Eqlid
- Bakhsh: Central
- Rural District: Shahr Meyan

Population (2006)
  - Total: 531
- Time zone: UTC+3:30 (IRST)
  - Summer (DST): UTC+4:30 (IRDT)

Baz Bachcheh (Persian: بازبچه, also Romanized as Bāz Bachcheh; also known as Baz Bacheh, Bāzīcheh, and Bāzīchi) is a village in Shahr Meyan Rural District, in the Central District of Eqlid County, Fars province, Iran. At the 2006 census, its population was 531, with 124 families.
