= Najafabad, Abadeh =

Najafabad نجف اباد
- Village
- Location within Iran
- Coordinates: 31°04′10″N 52°43′39″E
- Country: Iran
- Province: Fars
- County: Abadeh
- Bakhsh: Central
- Rural District: Bidak

Population (2006)
  - Total: 78
- Time zone: UTC+3:30 (IRST)
  - Summer (DST): UTC+4:30 (IRDT)

Najafabad (Persian: نجف اباد, also Romanized as Najafābād and Nejafābād; also known as Najafābād-e Pā’īn, Najaf Abad 'Olya, and Najaf Abad Sofla) is a village in Bidak Rural District, in the Central District of Abadeh County, Fars province, Iran. At the 2006 census, its population was 78, in 29 families.
