= Yaqubabad, Fars =

Yaqubabad يعقوب اباد
- Village
- Location within Iran
- Coordinates: 31°04′27″N 52°45′40″E
- Country: Iran
- Province: Fars
- County: Abadeh
- Bakhsh: Central
- Rural District: Bidak

Population (2006)
  - Total: 443
- Time zone: UTC+3:30 (IRST)
  - Summer (DST): UTC+4:30 (IRDT)

Yaqubabad (Persian: يعقوب اباد, also Romanized as Ya‘qūbābād; also known as Ya‘ghoob Abad) is a village in Bidak Rural District, in the Central District of Abadeh County, Fars province, Iran. At the 2006 census, its population was 443, in 121 families.
