= Deh-e Bala, Abadeh =

Deh-e Bala ده بالا
- Village
- Location within Iran
- Coordinates: 31°02′20″N 52°52′49″E
- Country: Iran
- Province: Fars
- County: Abadeh
- Bakhsh: Central
- Rural District: Surmaq

Population (2006)
  - Total: 204
- Time zone: UTC+3:30 (IRST)
  - Summer (DST): UTC+4:30 (IRDT)

Deh-e Bala (Persian: ده بالا, also Romanized as Deh-e Bālā, Deh Bāla, and Deh Bālā) is a village in Surmaq Rural District, in the Central District of Abadeh County, Fars province, Iran. At the 2006 census, its population was 204, in 58 families.
