= Pas Bol =

Pas Bol پس بل
- Village
- Location within Iran
- Coordinates: 30°42′45″N 52°50′03″E
- Country: Iran
- Province: Fars
- County: Eqlid
- Bakhsh: Central
- Rural District: Khonjesht

Population (2006)
  - Total: 33
- Time zone: UTC+3:30 (IRST)
  - Summer (DST): UTC+4:30 (IRDT)

Pas Bol (Persian: پس بل) is a village in Khonjesht Rural District, in the Central District of Eqlid County, Fars province, Iran. At the 2006 census, its population was 33, in 10 families.
