= Shevid Zar =

Shevid Zar شويدزار
- Village
- Location within Iran
- Coordinates: 30°59′30″N 52°23′54″E
- Country: Iran
- Province: Fars
- County: Eqlid
- Bakhsh: Central
- Rural District: Shahr Meyan

Population (2006)
  - Total: 138
- Time zone: UTC+3:30 (IRST)
  - Summer (DST): UTC+4:30 (IRDT)

Shevid Zar (Persian: شويدزار, also Romanized as Shevīd Zār) is a village in Shahr Meyan Rural District, in the Central District of Eqlid County, Fars province, Iran. At the 2006 census, its population was 138, in 30 families.
