= Firuzi, Abadeh =

Firuzi فيروزي
- Village
- Location within Iran
- Coordinates: 31°03′21″N 52°44′37″E
- Country: Iran
- Province: Fars
- County: Abadeh
- Bakhsh: Central
- Rural District: Bidak

Population (2006)
  - Total: 225
- Time zone: UTC+3:30 (IRST)
  - Summer (DST): UTC+4:30 (IRDT)

Firuzi (Persian: فيروزي, also Romanized as Fīrūz̄ī and Fīrūzī) is a village in Bidak Rural District, in the Central District of Abadeh County, Fars province, Iran. At the 2006 census, its population was 225, spread over 78 families.
