= Bidak, Abadeh =

Village in Fars province, Iran

Bidak Persian: بيدك
- Village
- Location within Iran
- Coordinates: 31°04′10″N 52°46′21″E
- Country: Iran
- Province: Fars
- County: Abadeh
- District: Central
- Rural District: Bidak

Population (2016)
  - Total: 2,507
- Time zone: UTC+3:30 (IRST)

Bidak (Persian: بيدك) (Note: Also romanized as Bīdak; also known as Qaşr-e Bīdak) is a village in, and the capital of, Bidak Rural District of the Central District of Abadeh County, Fars province, Iran.

== Demographics ==
=== Population ===
At the time of the 2006 National Census, the village's population was 2,479 in 598 households. The following census in 2011 counted 2,737 people in 784 households. The 2016 census measured the population of the village as 2,507 people in 756 households. It was the most populous village in its rural district.
