= Amirabad, Abadeh =

Village in Fars province, Iran

Amirabad Persian: اميراباد
- Village
- Location within Iran
- Coordinates: 31°03′27″N 52°47′19″E
- Country: Iran
- Province: Fars
- County: Abadeh
- District: Central
- Rural District: Surmaq

Population (2016)
  - Total: 304
- Time zone: UTC+3:30 (IRST)

Amirabad (Persian: اميراباد) (Note: Also romanized as Amīrābād) is a village in Surmaq Rural District of the Central District of Abadeh County, Fars province, Iran.

== Demographics ==
=== Population ===
At the time of the 2006 National Census, the village's population was 363 in 103 households, when it was in Bidak Rural District. The following census in 2011 counted 359 people in 115 households, by which time the village had been transferred to Surmaq Rural District. The 2016 census measured the population of the village as 304 people in 96 households. It was the most populous village in its rural district.
