= Seyfabad, Eqlid =

Seyfabad سيف اباد
- Village
- Country: Iran
- Province: Fars
- County: Eqlid
- Bakhsh: Central
- Rural District: Shahr Meyan

Population (2006)
  - Total: 128
- Time zone: UTC+3:30 (IRST)
  - Summer (DST): UTC+4:30 (IRDT)

Seyfabad (Persian: سيف اباد, also Romanized as Seyfābād) is a village in Shahr Meyan Rural District, in the Central District of Eqlid County, Fars province, Iran. At the 2006 census, its population was 128, in 29 families.
