= Badaki =

Badaki or Badeki (Persian: بادكي) may refer to:

- Badaki, Eqlid, Fars Province
- Badaki, Marvdasht, Fars Province
- Badaki, Chaypareh, West Azerbaijan Province
- Badaki, Urmia, West Azerbaijan Province
