= Abadeh =

City in Fars province, Iran

Abadeh Persian: آباده
- City
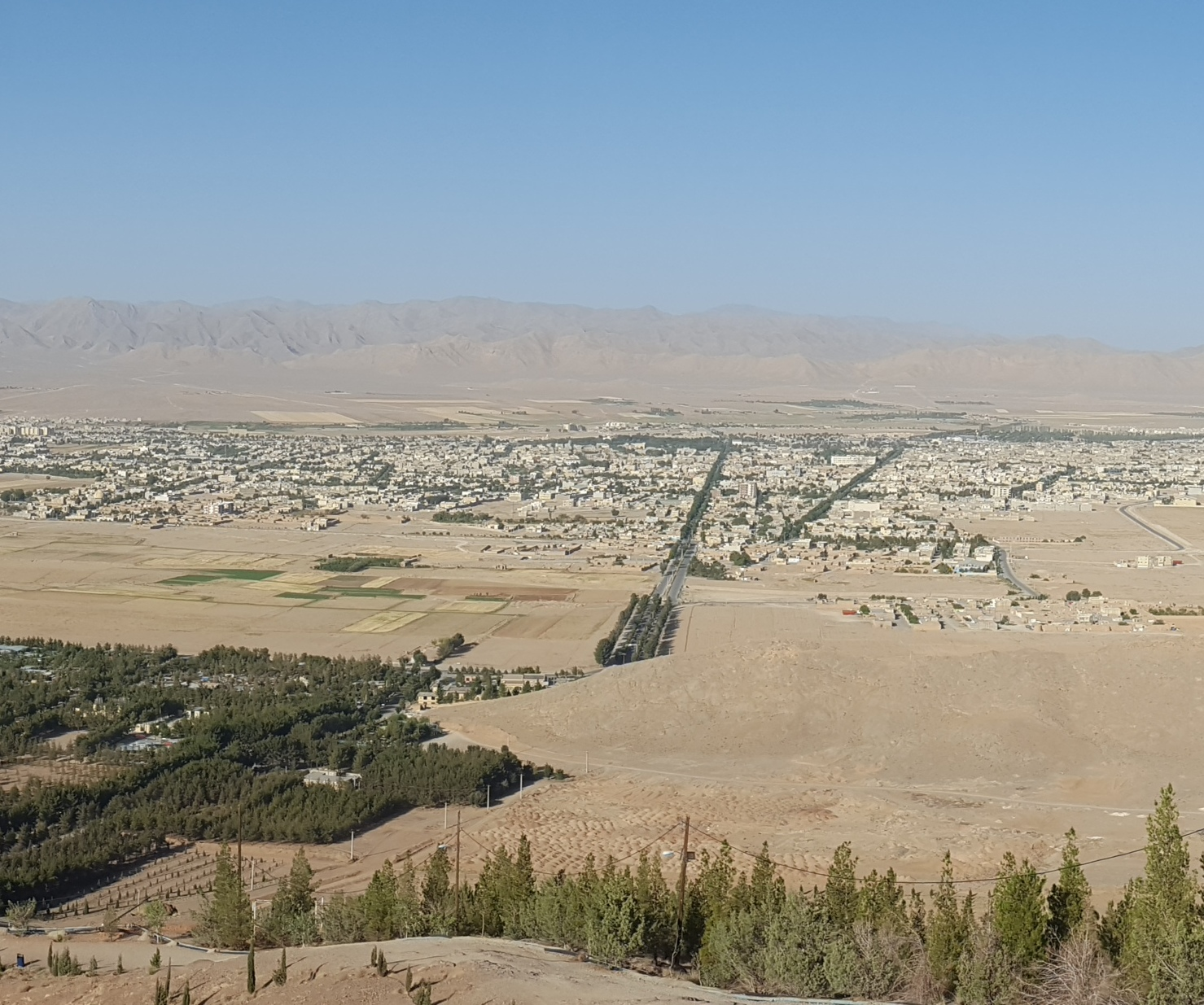
- Skyline of Abadeh from a mountain

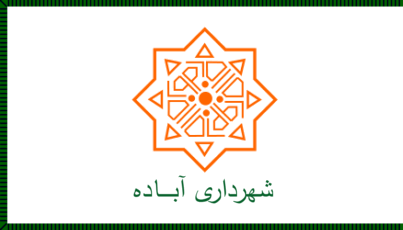
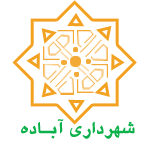
- Flag Seal

- Location within Iran
- Coordinates: 31°09′46″N 52°38′54″E
- Country: Iran
- Province: Fars
- County: Abadeh
- District: Central
- Established: 1925 (1304 Hejry Shamsi)

Government
  - Mayor (Shahrdar): Mehdi Shaker
  - Member of Parliament: Rahim Zare
- Elevation: 1,900 m (6,200 ft)

Population (2016)
  - Total: 59,116
- Time zone: UTC+3:30 (IRST)
- Postal Code: 73911-***** to 73991-*****
- Area code: 071
- Website: sh-abadeh.ir

Abadeh (Persian: آباده) (Note: Also romanized as Ābādeh) is a city in the Central District of Abadeh County, Fars province, Iran, serving as capital of both the county and the district.

Abadeh is the largest city in the Northern Fars Region (South-Central Iran), which is famed for its carved wood-work, made of the wood of pear and box trees. Sesame oil, castor oil, grain, and various fruits are also produced there. The area is famous for its Abadeh rugs.

The city is closer in road distance to the four provincial capitals of Isfahan (193 km), Yasuj (197 km), Yazd (217 km), and Shahrekord (237 km) compared with the distance to its own provincial capital, Shiraz (260 km).

== History ==
According to the texts of archaeologists, the settlement in the current area of Abadeh dates back to the first millennium BC. Nomadic Kurdish groups were the first to settle in the plain between Abadeh and Isfahan in the Achaemenid period. Remaining ancient monuments, such as the ancient castle of Izadkhas and Bahram Gur Palace in Surmaq, are proofs of the existence of culture and civilization in this geographical area. Abadeh city has a special position due to its location at the three-way communication between Isfahan, Yazd and Shiraz.

== Demographics ==
Abadeh Historical population
Year	Pop.	±%
1958	15,888	—
1976	23,383	+47.2%
1991	44,967	+92.3%
1996	48,882	+8.7%
2006	52,042	+6.5%
2011	55,758	+7.1%
2016	72,345	+29.7%
2026	96,549	+33.5%

=== Population ===
At the time of the 2006 National Census, the city's population was 52,042 in 14,184 households. The following census in 2011 counted 55,758 people in 16,546 households. The 2016 census measured the population of the city as 59,116 people in 18,965 households.

== Religion ==
Before the Arab invasion of Iran, all residents of Abadeh and its surrounding areas were Zoroastrian. They eventually converted to Islam and Shia doctrine during the Safavid period. Today, all citizens of Abadeh are Muslim and Twelver Shia, except for one Zoroastrian family and a few Jewish individuals residing in the county.

With the spread of the Babi movement and later the Baha'i faith in Iran, Abadeh has always been one of the centers of this religious tendency. In his book The History of the Iranian Constitutional Revolution, Kasravi, in the section on "Babi Wars," reports on their battles with government forces and refers to it as the "Abadeh War." Given that before the Babi movement there was also another movement called Shaykhism, it can be assumed that a number of Shaykhi citizens may still live in this city today.

== Geography ==
=== Location ===
Abadeh is at an elevation of 6,200 feet (1,890 m) in a fertile plain on the high road between Isfahan and Shiraz, 190 kilometres (120 mi) from the former and 270 kilometres (170 mi) from the latter.

Abadeh is in the northernmost point of Fars province. The city is connected to Isfahan province from the north and west, Safacity and Eqlid from the south, and Yazd province from the east. The city is located 270 kilometres (170 mi) north of Shiraz, 670 kilometres (420 mi) south of Tehran, 200 kilometres (120 mi) south of Isfahan, and 190 kilometres (120 mi) southwest of Yazd. The geographical area of Abadeh is 6,052 square kilometres (2,337 sq mi), which is about 11% of the total area of the province.

=== Climate ===
Abadeh features an arid climate (Köppen climate classification BWk) with heat and dryness over summer, and cold (extreme at times) and relatively wetter winters, with huge variations between daytime and nighttime throughout the year. The area can experience severely cold weather due to its high elevation.

Climate data for Abadeh (1991–2020 normals, extremes 1977–2020, elevation 2,030.0 m (6,660.1 ft))
Month	Jan	Feb	Mar	Apr	May	Jun	Jul	Aug	Sep	Oct	Nov	Dec	Year
Record high °C (°F)	19.6 (67.3)	21.6 (70.9)	27.2 (81.0)	28.6 (83.5)	35.0 (95.0)	38.8 (101.8)	39.6 (103.3)	39.3 (102.7)	36.4 (97.5)	32.6 (90.7)	25.4 (77.7)	24.0 (75.2)	39.6 (103.3)
Mean daily maximum °C (°F)	9.5 (49.1)	11.7 (53.1)	15.9 (60.6)	21.1 (70.0)	26.7 (80.1)	32.3 (90.1)	34.3 (93.7)	32.9 (91.2)	29.6 (85.3)	23.6 (74.5)	16.1 (61.0)	11.9 (53.4)	22.1 (71.8)
Daily mean °C (°F)	2.5 (36.5)	4.9 (40.8)	8.9 (48.0)	14.0 (57.2)	19.2 (66.6)	24.6 (76.3)	27.0 (80.6)	25.2 (77.4)	21.1 (70.0)	15.0 (59.0)	8.3 (46.9)	4.4 (39.9)	14.6 (58.3)
Mean daily minimum °C (°F)	−3.7 (25.3)	−1.5 (29.3)	2.0 (35.6)	6.8 (44.2)	10.8 (51.4)	14.9 (58.8)	17.8 (64.0)	15.8 (60.4)	11.7 (53.1)	6.4 (43.5)	1.2 (34.2)	−2.1 (28.2)	6.7 (44.0)
Record low °C (°F)	−20.2 (−4.4)	−20.2 (−4.4)	−10.0 (14.0)	−3.0 (26.6)	2.2 (36.0)	7.6 (45.7)	10.0 (50.0)	9.4 (48.9)	3.0 (37.4)	−2.2 (28.0)	−9.0 (15.8)	−21.4 (−6.5)	−21.4 (−6.5)
Average precipitation mm (inches)	21.4 (0.84)	15.2 (0.60)	26.5 (1.04)	19.5 (0.77)	9.2 (0.36)	0.9 (0.04)	0.7 (0.03)	0.3 (0.01)	0.2 (0.01)	3.9 (0.15)	14.7 (0.58)	25.7 (1.01)	138.2 (5.44)
Average snowfall cm (inches)	9.8 (3.9)	4.1 (1.6)	0.4 (0.2)	0.0 (0.0)	0.0 (0.0)	0.0 (0.0)	0.0 (0.0)	0.0 (0.0)	0.0 (0.0)	0.0 (0.0)	0.1 (0.0)	5.8 (2.3)	20.2 (8)
Average precipitation days (≥ 1.0 mm)	3.2	2.5	3.5	3.1	1.5	0.2	0.2	0.1	0.1	0.9	2.1	3	20.4
Average snowy days	3.2	1.2	0.6	0	0	0	0	0	0	0	0.2	1.9	7.1
Average relative humidity (%)	51	45	39	36	29	19	19	19	20	30	44	50	33
Average dew point °C (°F)	−7.7 (18.1)	−7.5 (18.5)	−6.2 (20.8)	−2.8 (27.0)	−1.5 (29.3)	−2.2 (28.0)	−0.1 (31.8)	−1.6 (29.1)	−4.3 (24.3)	−4.2 (24.4)	−4.9 (23.2)	−6.5 (20.3)	−4.1 (24.6)
Mean monthly sunshine hours	232	237	255	257	307	342	334	340	308	285	231	233	3,361
Source 1: NOAA NCEI (Snow 1981–2010)
Source 2: Iran Meteorological Organization (extremes)

== Economy ==
=== Air defense base ===
In 2012 Iran announced it had started the construction of an air defense site in the city of Abadeh. The site is planned to be the largest in the country and will house 6,000 personnel for a variety of duties, including educational ones.

=== Mining ===
The mines located in this city are:

Esteghlal Abadeh large refractory soil mine is one of the largest producers of this mineral. In addition to the Esteghlal refractory mine, there is also an industrial mine around the city where the raw materials are from tile, ceramic and brick factories in the country.

== Arts and crafts ==
=== Handicrafts ===
Abadeh woodwork is world famous and its examples are kept in world museums as the best works of art. The carvings of the Marble Palace were made by the artists of this city, such as Master Ahmad Emami. In 2017, the World Council of Handicrafts (WCC) introduced Abadeh as the world city of carving. Monbat Abadeh has 150 active domestic or commercial carving workshops and 5000 carving artists.

Abadeh crafts can be embroidered in cotton. The town also produces Abadeh rugs.

The rugs tend to be based on a cotton warp and have a thin, tightly knotted pile. Most Abadeh rugs are closely cut making them very flat. Although some of the older Abadehs vary in style, many of the new designs are easily recognisable. These new designs, known as Heybatlu consist of a single diamond shaped medallion in the centre with smaller medallions on each corner. The pattern is typically geometrical flowers or animals and the main colours are light reds or burnt orange on top of a dark blue background with strong green details. The corners or borders are generally ivory in colour. Although some Abadeh and Shiraz rugs appear similar Abadeh can normally be differentiated by their higher knot counts as well as the fact that the warp is invariably cotton. The rugs are almost always exclusively medium in size and the KPSI of an average Abadeh is around 90. As always in the rug-world you get what you pay for however in general Abadeh are well made and fairly popular items, particularly in modern interiors or those with a Mediterranean or North African style.

== Transportation ==
Expressway 65 passes through Abadeh. This situation helps Abadeh to improve its capabilities compared to the neighboring city, Eqlid. Road 78 makes connections from Abadeh to Abarkuh, Yazd Eqlid and Yasuj. It has a junction with Abadeh Shiraz Expressway 24 km south of the city. A road starts from Abadeh Ring Road to Soqad and Semirom, Road 55.

The railroad from Isfahan to Shiraz passes Abadeh and there are train services at Abadeh Railway Station to Shiraz, Esfahan, Tehran and Mashad. Abadeh Airport (OISA) was planned to be built in the mid-1990s.

== Historical monuments ==
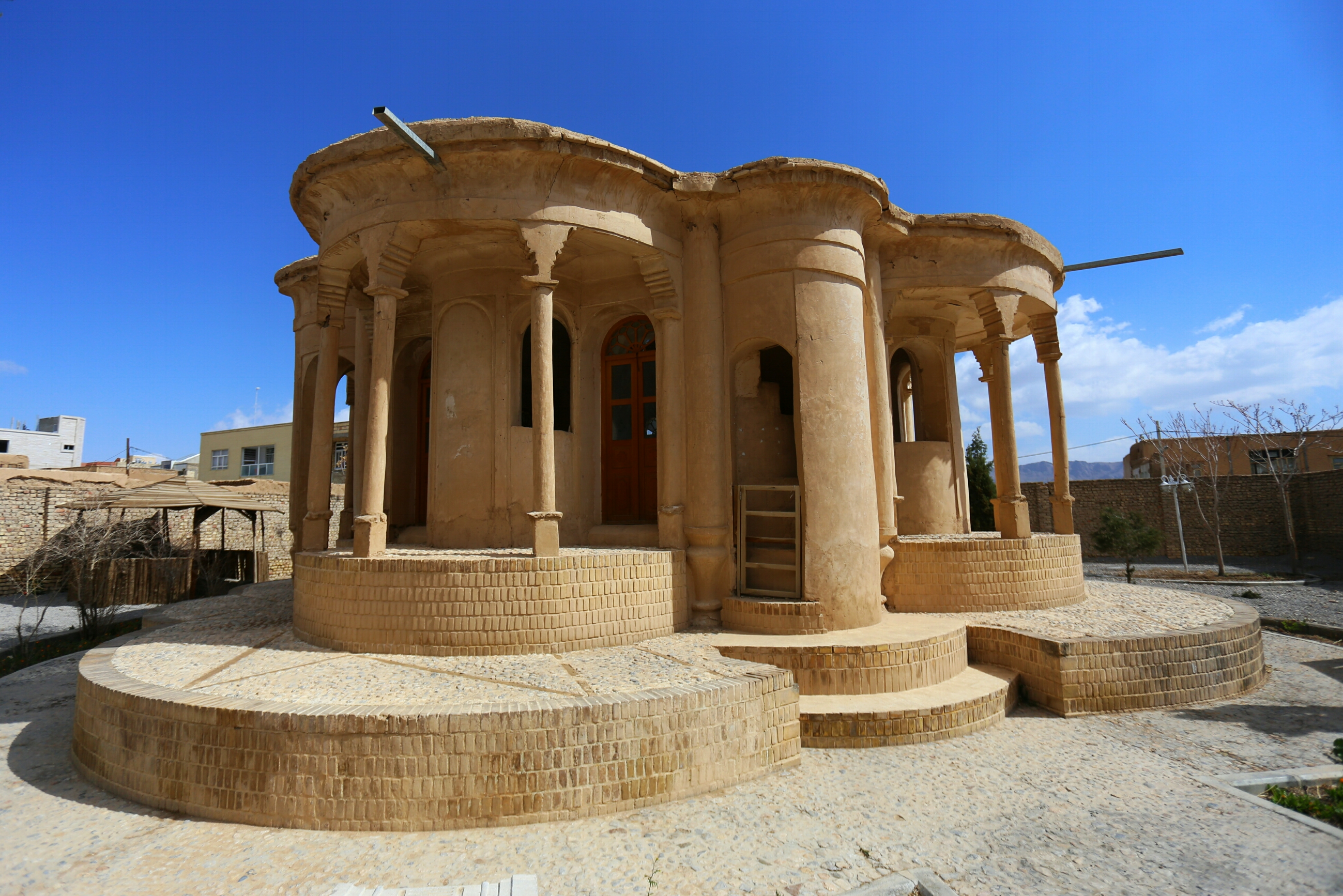
Abadeh Kiosk

Abadeh historical monuments include Emirate Kolah Farangi, Tymcheh Sarafyan and Khaje tomb, located in the Khoja mountains.

== Sports ==
Abadeh's main sport is football, as in the rest of the country. The main stadium is Takhti Stadium located in Mo'allem Square. The main team in Abadeh is Behineh Rahbar Abadeh F.C. which is currently playing in Iran Football's 3rd Division after finishing first in Fars Provincial League (FPL) last year. It played in Hazfi Cup 2010-11 reaching the fourth round.

== Education ==
Abadeh Higher Education Center

Abadeh School of Nursing

Islamic Azad University, Abadeh Branch

Payam Noor University, Abadeh Branch

University of Applied Science and Technology, Abadeh Branch

== Notable people ==
Dr. Zabihollah Ghorban, physician, founder and first chancellor of Shiraz University

Dr. Bizhan Aarabi, neurosurgeon and professor at the University of Maryland

Jamshid SedaghatKish, researcher, Iranologist, and lasting figure of 2005

Amanatollah Roshan Za'er, writer, translator, and physicist

Jalal Zolfonun, musician and setar player

Mahmoud Zolfonun, violinist

Arash Majidi, actor

Hossein Qasami, writer

Mojtaba Heidarpanah, cartoonist and illustrator

Ali-Akbar Delbari, musician, composer, and orchestra conductor

Hooshmand Aghili, singer and musicologist

Ruhollah Hosseinian, politician

Rahmatollah Khosravi, politician

Ahmad Emami, woodcarver

Mohammad Taher Emami, woodcarver

Owrang Khazraei, Iranian leftist poet and speaker at the Ten Nights of Goethe – friend and companion of Houshang Golshiri

Bozorg Khazraei, Iranian leftist painter – designer of the Ten Nights of Goethe poster

Iman Eslamian, Banking researcher – former deputy CEO of Bank Saderat Iran and deputy Ministry of Roads and Urban Development in the 13th government

Shah Ismail III, last nominal king of the Safavid dynasty, who was figurehead king of Iran for 24 years

Seraj al-Hokama Agah, first physician of Abadeh – honored with this title by Naser al-Din Shah Qajar

Dr. Talie Agah, one of the first professors of nursing at Shiraz University

Dr. Keyhan Ghorban, first female physician in Abadeh

Dr. Badio'llah Firoozi, one of the first graduates in geography – lived in Switzerland

Ataollah Bastani, one of the first chemistry teachers in Fars province and Abadeh – organizer of entrance exam classes in Tehran and Shiraz

Minoo Hamidi, chargé d'affaires of the Iranian embassy in Italy during the Pahlavi era

Asadollah Araabi, born 1927 – one of the chiefs and directors of shahrbani during the Pahlavi era – one of the directors of the national gendarmerie

Dr. Jalil Haghighat-Kish, one of the first dentists in Fars province and Abadeh

Naser Choubineh, born 1930 – one of the first graduates in French language in Fars province and Abadeh

Hooshang Memarzadeh, former editor-in-chief of Gol Agha – writer and humorist

Marziyeh, singer born in Abadeh in 1924 in Tehran

General Seyfollah Hemmat, born 1898 – governor of Fars from 1953 to 1955

Ruhollah Abbasi, leftist writer and translator

Poor Fereydoon Abadehei, Poet of the 13th century AH, contemporary with Saadi Shirazi

Seyed Mohammad Torbati, researcher of history, world studies and political science, founder of the first scientific-student association of world studies in Iranian universities (WSSA)

Soghyma Abadehei, poet of the 11th century AH, lived in the mid-Safavid period

Heydar Ali Derghuki Abadehei, known as Mozaneb Abadehei, poet, mystic and sage of the Qajar period – born 1882, died 1942

Dr. Nader Fanaei, faculty member at K. N. Toosi University of Technology of Technology

== See also ==
Abadeh travel guide from Wikivoyage
