= Badaki, Eqlid =

Badaki بادكي
- Village
- Location within Iran
- Coordinates: 30°54′34″N 52°21′28″E
- Country: Iran
- Province: Fars
- County: Eqlid
- Bakhsh: Central
- Rural District: Shahr Meyan

Population (2006)
  - Total: 76
- Time zone: UTC+3:30 (IRST)
  - Summer (DST): UTC+4:30 (IRDT)

Badaki (Persian: بادكي, also Romanized as Bādakī) is a village in Shahr Meyan Rural District, in the Central District of Eqlid County, Fars province, Iran. At the 2006 census, its population was 76, in 22 families.
