= Basiran =

Basiran (Persian: بصيران) may refer to the following places inn Irqn:

- Basiran, Fars
- Basiran, South Khorasan
