= Darreh Gol =

Darreh Gol or Darreh Gel (Persian: دره گل) may refer to:

- Darreh Gol, Fars
- Darreh Gol, Yazd
