= Cheshmeh Rana =

Village in Fars province, Iran

Cheshmeh Rana Persian: چشمه رعنا
- Village
- Location within Iran
- Coordinates: 30°34′10″N 52°38′50″E
- Country: Iran
- Province: Fars
- County: Eqlid
- District: Central
- Rural District: Khonjesht

Population (2016)
  - Total: 2,714
- Time zone: UTC+3:30 (IRST)

Cheshmeh Rana (Persian: چشمه رعنا) (Note: Also romanized as Cheshmeh Ra‘nā; also known as Chashmeh-ye Ra‘nā Kord Shūl, Cheshmeh Ra‘nā Kord, Kord Shūl, and Kurd Shūl) is a village in Khonjesht Rural District of the Central District of Eqlid County, Fars province, Iran.

== Demographics ==
=== Ethnicity ===
The majority of the people of Cheshmeh Rana are from the Kordshuli tribe.

=== Population ===
At the time of the 2006 National Census, the village's population was 2,186 in 436 households. The following census in 2011 counted 2,255 people in 574 households. The 2016 census measured the population of the village as 2,714 people in 762 households. It was the most populous village in its rural district.
