= Eqbalabad, Eqlid =

Eqbalabad اقبال اباد
- Village
- Country: Iran
- Province: Fars
- County: Eqlid
- Bakhsh: Central
- Rural District: Shahr Meyan

Population (2006)
  - Total: 31
- Time zone: UTC+3:30 (IRST)
  - Summer (DST): UTC+4:30 (IRDT)

Eqbalabad (Persian: اقبال اباد, also Romanized as Eqbālābād) is a village in Shahr Meyan Rural District, in the Central District of Eqlid County, Fars province, Iran. At the 2006 census, its population was 31, in 5 families.
