= Khonjesht =

Village in Fars province, Iran

Khonjesht Persian: خنجشت
- Village
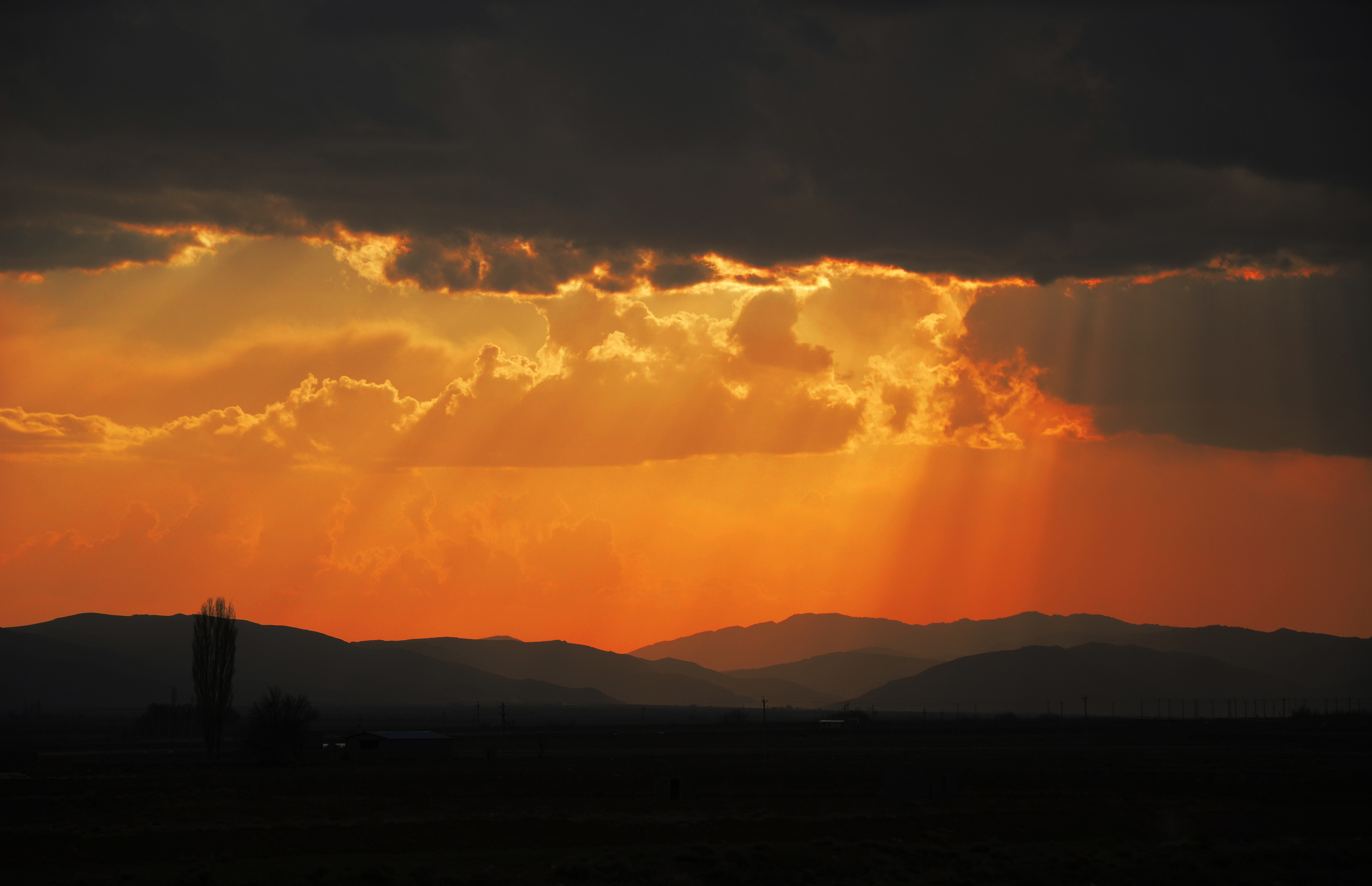
- Landscape near Khonjesht

- Location within Iran
- Coordinates: 30°39′13″N 52°40′24″E
- Country: Iran
- Province: Fars
- County: Eqlid
- District: Central
- Rural District: Khonjesht

Population (2016)
  - Total: 2,487
- Time zone: UTC+3:30 (IRST)

Khonjesht (Persian: خنجشت) (Note: Also known as Khongesht, Khongshet, and Khūngesht) is a village in, and the capital of, Khonjesht Rural District of the Central District of Eqlid County, Fars province, Iran.

== Demographics ==
=== Ethnicity ===
The village is the main settlement of the Kurdish Kordshuli tribe.

=== Population ===
At the time of the 2006 National Census, the village's population was 2,366 in 534 households. The following census in 2011 counted 2,363 people in 589 households. The 2016 census measured the population of the village as 2,487 people in 768 households.
