= Shad Kam =

Shad Kam or Shadkam (Persian: شادكام) may refer to:

- Shadkam, Fars
- Shad Kam, Yazd
