= Ab Barik, Fars =

Village in Fars province, Iran

Ab Barik Persian: ابباريك
- Village
- Location within Iran
- Coordinates: 30°42′22″N 52°28′52″E
- Country: Iran
- Province: Fars
- County: Eqlid
- District: Central
- Rural District: Shahr Meyan

Population (2016)
  - Total: 1,521
- Time zone: UTC+3:30 (IRST)

Ab Barik (Persian: ابباريك) (Note: Also romanized as Āb Bārīk) is a village in Shahr Meyan Rural District of the Central District of Eqlid County, Fars province, Iran.

== Demographics ==
=== Population ===
At the time of the 2006 National Census, the village's population was 1,405 in 297 households. The following census in 2011 counted 1,383 people in 321 households. The 2016 census measured the population of the village as 1,521 people in 417 households. It was the most populous village in its rural district.
