= Basiran, Fars =

Basiran بصيران
- Village
- Location within Iran
- Coordinates: 30°48′38″N 52°50′39″E
- Country: Iran
- Province: Fars
- County: Eqlid
- Bakhsh: Central
- Rural District: Khonjesht

Population (2006)
  - Total: 24
- Time zone: UTC+3:30 (IRST)
  - Summer (DST): UTC+4:30 (IRDT)

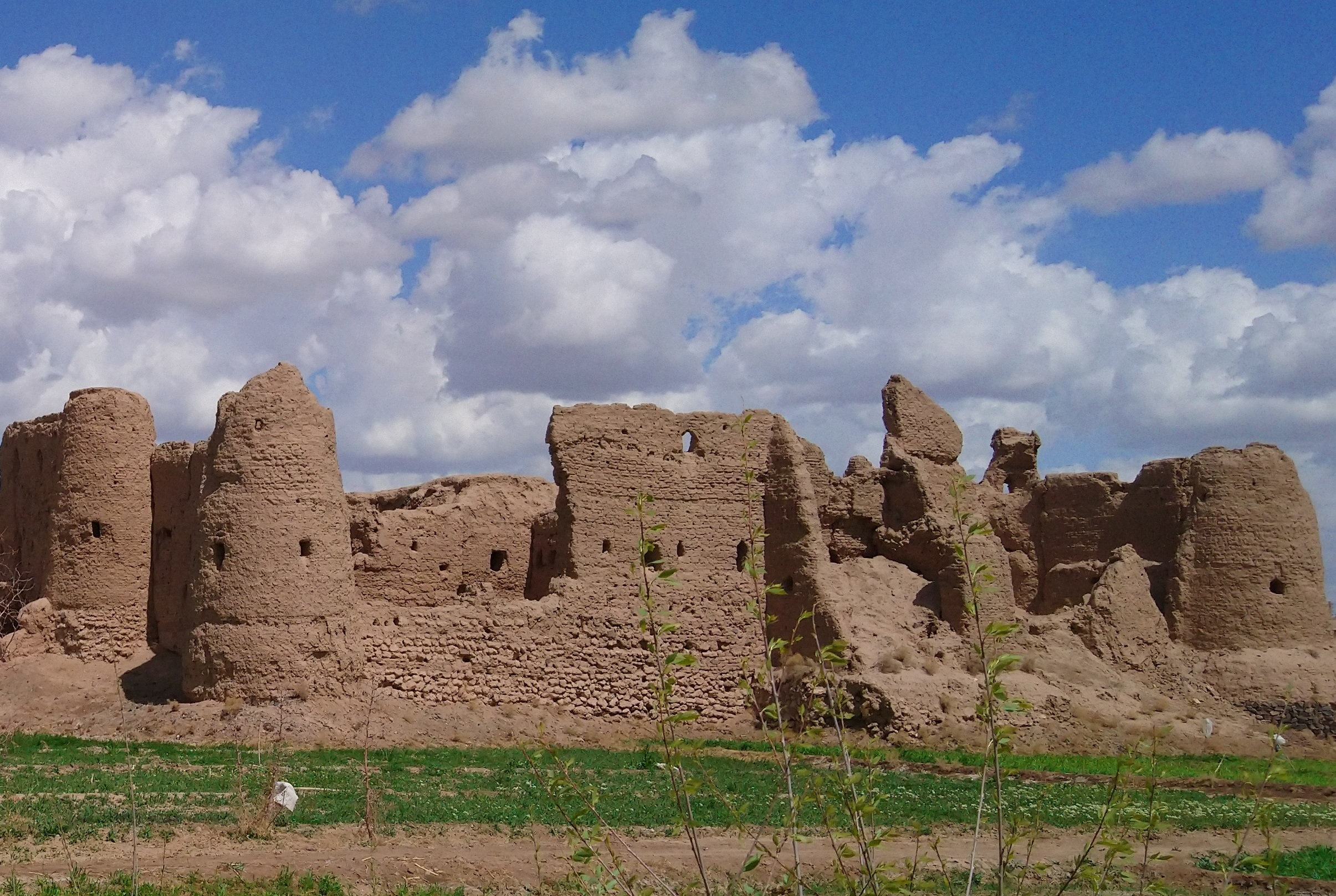

Basiran (Persian: بصيران, also Romanized as Başīrān; also known as Başīrūn and Mazra‘eh-ye Başīrān) is a village in Khonjesht Rural District, in the Central District of Eqlid County, Fars province, Iran. At the 2006 census, its population was 24, in 5 families.
