= Darreh Gol, Fars =

Darreh Gol, Iran دره گل
- Village
- Location within Iran
- Coordinates: 30°47′03″N 52°20′52″E
- Country: Iran
- Province: Fars
- County: Eqlid
- Bakhsh: Central
- Rural District: Shahr Meyan

Population (2006)
  - Total: 41
- Time zone: UTC+3:30 (IRST)
  - Summer (DST): UTC+4:30 (IRDT)

Darreh Gol (Persian: دره گل) is a village in Shahr Meyan Rural District, in the Central District of Eqlid County, Fars province, Iran. At the 2006 census, its population was 41, in 11 families.
