= Shahr Meyan =

Village in Fars province, Iran

Shahr Meyan Persian: شهرميان
- Village
- Location within Iran
- Coordinates: 30°50′23″N 52°21′00″E
- Country: Iran
- Province: Fars
- County: Eqlid
- District: Central
- Rural District: Shahr Meyan

Population (2016)
  - Total: 1,340
- Time zone: UTC+3:30 (IRST)

Shahr Meyan (Persian: شهرميان) (Note: Also romanized as Shahr Meyān and Shahr Mīān; also known as Shahr Mīān-e Bālā, Shahr Mīān-e Kohneh, Shahr Mīān-e Now, Shahr Mīān-e Soflá, Shahr Mīyān, and Shar Mīān-e ‘Olyā) is a village in, and the capital of, Shahr Meyan Rural District of the Central District of Eqlid County, Fars province, Iran.

== Demographics ==
=== Population ===
At the time of the 2006 National Census, the village's population was 1,786 in 393 households. The following census in 2011 counted 1,533 people in 431 households. The 2016 census measured the population of the village as 1,340 people in 415 households. It was the most populous village in its rural district.
