= Bahman, Fars =

City in Fars province, Iran

Bahman Persian: بهمن
- City
- Location within Iran
- Coordinates: 31°11′46″N 52°29′15″E
- Country: Iran
- Province: Fars
- County: Abadeh
- District: Bahman and Soghad

Population (2016)
  - Total: 7,568
- Time zone: UTC+3:30 (IRST)

Bahman (Persian: بهمن) is a city in Bahman and Soghad District of Abadeh County, Fars province, Iran, serving as the administrative center for Bahman Rural District.

== Demographics ==
=== Population ===
At the time of the 2006 National Census, the city's population was 6,484 in 1,604 households, when it was in the Central District. The following census in 2011 counted 7,305 people in 2,077 households. The 2016 census measured the population of the city as 7,568 people in 2,325 households.

In July 2018, the city and the rural district were separated from the district in the establishment of Bahman and Soghad District.
