= Izadkhast Rural District =

Rural district in Fars province, Iran

Izadkhast Rural District Persian: دهستان ايزدخواست
- Rural District
- Location within Iran
- Coordinates: 31°28′32″N 52°08′26″E
- Country: Iran
- Province: Fars
- County: Abadeh
- District: Central
- Capital: Izadkhast

Population (2016)
  - Total: 0
- Time zone: UTC+3:30 (IRST)

Izadkhast Rural District (Persian: دهستان ايزدخواست) is in the Central District of Abadeh County, Fars province, Iran. It is administered from the city of Izadkhast.

== Demographics ==
=== Population ===
At the time of the 2006 National Census, the rural district's population was below the reporting threshold. There were 101 inhabitants in 30 households at the following census of 2011. The 2016 census measured the population of the rural district as zero. None of its 39 villages reported a population.
