= Abadeh rug =

Type of Persian carpet

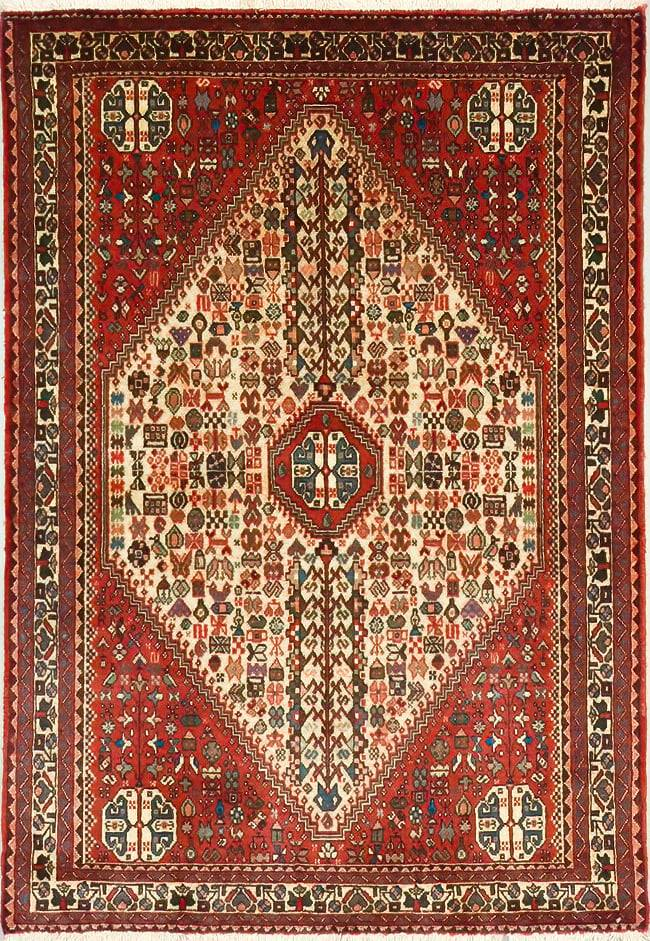
Typical Abadeh rug design.

An Abaadeh carpet is a type of Persian carpet made in the town of Abadeh in Iran.

== History ==
The rugs are named after the city of Abadeh, halfway between Isfahan and Shiraz in Iran, where these rugs are made.

== Design ==
The rugs often feature a large diamond pattern in the centre, with smaller ones in the corners also.
