= Surmaq =

City in Fars province, Iran

Surmaq Persian: سورمق
- City
- Location within Iran
- Coordinates: 31°01′59″N 52°50′36″E
- Country: Iran
- Province: Fars
- County: Abadeh
- District: Central

Population (2016)
  - Total: 3,050
- Time zone: UTC+3:30 (IRST)

Surmaq (Persian: سورمق) (Note: Also romanized as Sūrmaq; also known as Soormagh and Sūrmak) is a city in the Central District of Abadeh County, Fars province, Iran, serving as the administrative center for Surmaq Rural District.

== Demographics ==
=== Population ===
At the time of the 2006 National Census, the city's population was 3,116 in 917 households. The following census in 2011 counted 3,458 people in 1,083 households. The 2016 census measured the population of the city as 3,050 people in 1,052 households.
