= Kord Shul, Qir and Karzin =

Kord Shul كردشول
- Village
- Location within Iran
- Coordinates: 28°27′23″N 53°04′58″E
- Country: Iran
- Province: Fars
- County: Qir and Karzin
- Bakhsh: Central
- Rural District: Fathabad

Population (2006)
  - Total: 197
- Time zone: UTC+3:30 (IRST)
  - Summer (DST): UTC+4:30 (IRDT)

Kord Shul (Persian: كردشول, also Romanized as Kord Shūl; also known as Gerd Shūl and Kurd Shūl) is a village in Fathabad Rural District, in the Central District of Qir and Karzin County, Fars province, Iran. At the 2006 census, its population was 197, in 40 families. The majority of the population of Kord Shul are from Kordshuli tribe.
