= Aba Saleh al-Mahdi tunnel =

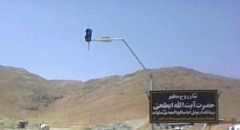
- South portal of the Aba Saleh al-Mahdi Tunnel.

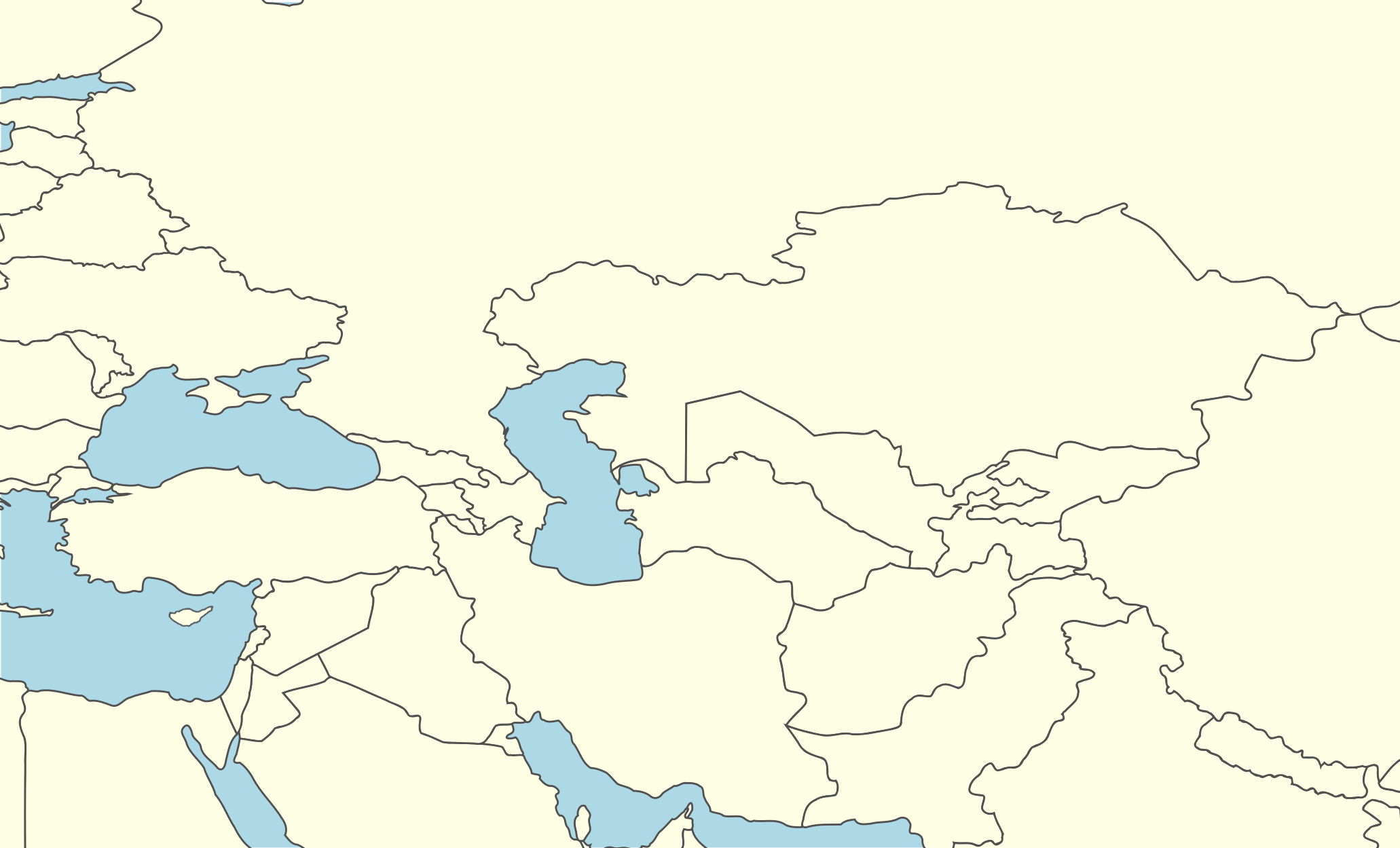
- Location within Iran Location within Central Asia

Overview
- Location: Iran
- Coordinates: 30°52′44″N 52°33′18″E
- Route: Yasuj

Technical
- Length: 2.610 km (1.622 mi)
- No. of lanes: 2
- Width: 8 m (26 ft)

The Aba Saleh al-Mahdi Tunnel is a highway tunnel in Asia running under the Zagros Mountains in the Eqlid, Fars province of Iran. This tunnel is one of the largest in Iran and the Middle East. It was completed on June 27, 2013. and is 2.610 kilometres (1.622 mi) long and 8 meters (26 ft) wide. It reduces the route from Eqlid to Yasuj by 10 km (6.2 mi) and connects the district of Eqlid with the district of Chahar Dange.

The tunnel was in part built as an alternative route from Eqlid to the district of Chahar Dange, shortening the trip by about 20 minutes. By the order of Ayatollah Seyyed Mohammad-Bagher Movahhed Abtahi and the help of some religious people, they constructed this tunnel.
