= Najafabad, Dargaz =

Najafabad نجف اباد
- Village
- Country: Iran
- Province: Razavi Khorasan
- County: Dargaz
- Bakhsh: Now Khandan
- Rural District: Shahrestaneh

Population (2006)
  - Total: 27
- Time zone: UTC+3:30 (IRST)
  - Summer (DST): UTC+4:30 (IRDT)

Najafabad (Persian: نجف اباد, also Romanized as Najafābād) is a village in Shahrestaneh Rural District, Now Khandan District, Dargaz County, Razavi Khorasan Province, Iran. At the 2006 census, its population was 27, in 7 families.
