= Yaqubabad, Razavi Khorasan =

Yaqubabad يعقوب اباد
- Village
- Country: Iran
- Province: Razavi Khorasan
- County: Quchan
- Bakhsh: Central
- Rural District: Shirin Darreh

Population (2006)
  - Total: 38
- Time zone: UTC+3:30 (IRST)
  - Summer (DST): UTC+4:30 (IRDT)

Yaqubabad (Persian: يعقوب اباد, also Romanized as Yaʿqūbābād) is a village in Shirin Darreh Rural District, in the Central District of Quchan County, Razavi Khorasan Province, Iran. At the 2006 census, its population was 38, in 9 families.
