= Deh Bala, Sirjan =

Village in Kerman, Iran

Deh Bala ده بالا
- Village
- Location within Iran
- Coordinates: 29°46′30″N 56°02′20″E
- Country: Iran
- Province: Kerman
- County: Sirjan
- Bakhsh: Central
- Rural District: Chahar Gonbad

Population (2006)
  - Total: 13
- Time zone: UTC+3:30 (IRST)
  - Summer (DST): UTC+4:30 (IRDT)

Deh Bala (Persian: ده بالا, also Romanized as Deh Bālā and Deh-e Bālā) is a village in the Chahar Gonbad Rural District, Central District, Sirjan County, Kerman Province, Iran. At the 2006 census, its population was 13, in 6 families.
