= Eqbalabad, Jahrom =

Eqbalabad اقبال‌آباد
- Village
- Location within Iran
- Coordinates: 28°35′33″N 53°26′25″E
- Country: Iran
- Province: Fars
- County: Jahrom
- Bakhsh: Central
- Rural District: Jolgah

Population (2006)
  - Total: 175
- Time zone: UTC+3:30 (IRST)
  - Summer (DST): UTC+4:30 (IRDT)

Eqbalabad (Persian: اقبال‌آباد, also Romanized as Eqbālābād) is a village in Jolgah Rural District, in the Central District of Jahrom County, Fars province, Iran. At the 2006 census, its population was 175, in 41 families.
