= Najafabad, Qorveh =

Najafabad نجف آباد
- Village
- Location within Iran
- Coordinates: 35°26′05″N 47°35′45″E
- Country: Iran
- Province: Kurdistan
- County: Qorveh
- Bakhsh: Serishabad
- Rural District: Lak

Population (2006)
  - Total: 93
- Time zone: UTC+3:30 (IRST)
  - Summer (DST): UTC+4:30 (IRDT)

Najafabad (Persian: نجف آباد, also Romanized as Najafābād) is a village in Lak Rural District, Serishabad District, Qorveh County, Kurdistan Province, Iran. At the 2006 census, its population was 93, in 19 families. The village is populated by Kurds.
