= Najafabad, Qir and Karzin =

Najafabad نجف اباد
- Village
- Location within Iran
- Coordinates: 28°27′18″N 53°05′29″E
- Country: Iran
- Province: Fars
- County: Qir and Karzin
- Bakhsh: Central
- Rural District: Fathabad

Population (2006)
  - Total: 560
- Time zone: UTC+3:30 (IRST)
  - Summer (DST): UTC+4:30 (IRDT)

Najafabad (Persian: نجف اباد, also Romanized as Najafābād and Nejafābād) is a village in Fathabad Rural District, in the Central District of Qir and Karzin County, Fars province, Iran. At the 2006 census, its population was 560, in 128 families.
