= Firuzi, Shiraz =

Firuzi فيروزي
- Village
- Location within Iran
- Coordinates: 29°40′40″N 52°57′06″E
- Country: Iran
- Province: Fars
- County: Shiraz
- Bakhsh: Zarqan
- Rural District: Band-e Amir

Population (2006)
  - Total: 112
- Time zone: UTC+3:30 (IRST)
  - Summer (DST): UTC+4:30 (IRDT)

Firuzi (Persian: فيروزي, also Romanized as Fīrūzī; also known as Firuzi Korbal and Fīrūzī-ye Korbāl) is a village in Band-e Amir Rural District, Zarqan District, Shiraz County, Fars province, Iran. At the 2006 census, its population was 112, in 32 families.
