= Qaleh Jabreil =

Qaleh Jabreil قلعه جبرييل
- Village
- Location within Iran
- Coordinates: 35°01′04″N 47°22′57″E
- Country: Iran
- Province: Kermanshah
- County: Sonqor
- Bakhsh: Kolyai
- Rural District: Agahan

Population (2006)
  - Total: 66
- Time zone: UTC+3:30 (IRST)
  - Summer (DST): UTC+4:30 (IRDT)

Qaleh Jabreil (Persian: قلعه جبرييل, also Romanized as Qal‘eh Jabre’īl and Qal‘eh-ye Jabrā’īl; also known as Deh Bālā, Deh-i-Jurail, and Deh Zhūrā) is a village in Agahan Rural District, Kolyai District, Sonqor County, Kermanshah Province, Iran. At the 2006 census, its population was 66, in 16 families.
