= Yaqubabad, Buin Zahra =

Yaqubabad يعقوب اباد
- Village
- Location within Iran
- Coordinates: 35°59′05″N 49°56′22″E
- Country: Iran
- Province: Qazvin
- County: Buin Zahra
- Bakhsh: Central
- Rural District: Zahray-ye Bala

Population (2006)
  - Total: 35
- Time zone: UTC+3:30 (IRST)
  - Summer (DST): UTC+4:30 (IRDT)

Yaqubabad (Persian: يعقوب اباد, also Romanized as Ya‘qūbābād) is a village in Zahray-ye Bala Rural District, in the Central District of Buin Zahra County, Qazvin Province, Iran. At the 2006 census, its population was 35, in 9 families.
