= Deh-e Bala, Kerman =

Deh-e Bala ده بالا
- Village
- Location within Iran
- Coordinates: 30°19′34″N 57°15′25″E
- Country: Iran
- Province: Kerman
- County: Kerman
- Bakhsh: Central
- Rural District: Sar Asiab-e Farsangi

Population (2006)
  - Total: 232
- Time zone: UTC+3:30 (IRST)
  - Summer (DST): UTC+4:30 (IRDT)

Deh-e Bala (Persian: ده بالا, also Romanized as Deh-e Bālā) is a village in Sar Asiab-e Farsangi Rural District, in the Central District of Kerman County, Kerman Province, Iran. At the 2006 census, its population was 232, in 71 families.
