= Firuzi, Marvdasht =

Firuzi فيروزي
- Village
- Location within Iran
- Coordinates: 29°55′42″N 52°50′01″E
- Country: Iran
- Province: Fars
- County: Marvdasht
- Bakhsh: Central
- Rural District: Kenareh

Population (2006)
  - Total: 2,639
- Time zone: UTC+3:30 (IRST)
  - Summer (DST): UTC+4:30 (IRDT)

Firuzi (Persian: فيروزي, also Romanized as Fīrūzī; also known as Firoozi Marvdasht and Fīrūzī-ye Marvdasht) is a village in Kenareh Rural District, in the Central District of Marvdasht County, Fars province, Iran. At the 2006 census, its population was 2,639, in 699 families.
