= Najafabad, Qazvin =

Neighborhood in Qazvin province, Iran

Najafabad Persian: نجف اباد
- Neighborhood
- Location within Iran
- Coordinates: 36°17′14″N 50°04′08″E
- Country: Iran
- Province: Qazvin
- County: Qazvin
- District: Central
- City: Qazvin

Population (2011)
  - Total: 1,456
- Time zone: UTC+3:30 (IRST)

Najafabad (Persian: نجف اباد) (Note: Also romanized as Najafābād) is a neighborhood in the city of Qazvin in the Central District of Qazvin County, Qazvin province, Iran.

== Demographics ==
=== Population ===
At the time of the 2006 National Census, Najafabad's population was 1,348 in 347 households, when it was a village in Eqbal-e Sharqi Rural District. The following census in 2011 counted 1,456 people in 422 households. The village was annexed to the city of Qazvin in 2015.
