= Deh-e Yaqub =

Deh-e Yaqub ده يعقوب
- Village
- Location within Iran
- Coordinates: 30°38′02″N 56°25′37″E
- Country: Iran
- Province: Kerman
- County: Zarand
- Bakhsh: Central
- Rural District: Jorjafak

Population (2006)
  - Total: 17
- Time zone: UTC+3:30 (IRST)
  - Summer (DST): UTC+4:30 (IRDT)

Deh-e Yaqub (Persian: ده يعقوب, also Romanized as Deh-e Ya‘qūb and Deh Ya‘qūb; also known as Ya’ghoob, Ya’qob, and Ya‘qūbābād) is a village in Jorjafak Rural District, in the Central District of Zarand County, Kerman Province, Iran. At the 2006 census, its population was 17, in 8 families.
