= Eqbalabad, Yazd =

Eqbalabad اقبال اباد
- Village
- Location within Iran
- Coordinates: 31°19′37″N 54°04′50″E
- Country: Iran
- Province: Yazd
- County: Taft
- Bakhsh: Nir
- Rural District: Garizat

Population (2006)
  - Total: 34
- Time zone: UTC+3:30 (IRST)
  - Summer (DST): UTC+4:30 (IRDT)

Eqbalabad (Persian: اقبال اباد, also Romanized as Eqbālābād) is a village in Garizat Rural District, Nir District, Taft County, Yazd Province, Iran. At the 2006 census, its population was 34, in 10 families.
