= Najafabad, Arsanjan =

Najafabad نجفاباد
- Village
- Location within Iran
- Coordinates: 29°42′18″N 53°14′19″E
- Country: Iran
- Province: Fars
- County: Arsanjan
- Bakhsh: Central
- Rural District: Shurab

Population (2006)
  - Total: 117
- Time zone: UTC+3:30 (IRST)
  - Summer (DST): UTC+4:30 (IRDT)

Najafabad (Persian: نجفاباد, also Romanized as Najafābād) is a village in Shurab Rural District, in the Central District of Arsanjan County, Fars province, Iran. At the 2006 census, its population was 117, in 27 families.
