= Deh Bala, Kermanshah =

Deh Bala ده بالا
- Village
- Location within Iran
- Coordinates: 34°33′04″N 48°04′45″E
- Country: Iran
- Province: Kermanshah
- County: Kangavar
- Bakhsh: Central
- Rural District: Gowdin

Population (2006)
  - Total: 65
- Time zone: UTC+3:30 (IRST)
  - Summer (DST): UTC+4:30 (IRDT)

Deh Bala (Persian: ده بالا, also Romanized as Deh Bālā and Deh-e Bālā) is a village in Gowdin Rural District, in the Central District of Kangavar County, Kermanshah Province, Iran. At the 2006 census, its population was 65, in 13 families.
