= Najafabad Rural District =

Najafabad Rural District (Persian: دهستان نجف آباد) may refer to:

- Najafabad Rural District (Kerman Province)
- Najafabad Rural District (Kurdistan Province)
