= Khosrow Shirin Rural District =

Rural district in Fars province, Iran

Khosrow Shirin Rural District Persian: دهستان خسرو شيرين
- Rural District
- Location within Iran
- Coordinates: 30°59′48″N 52°03′16″E
- Country: Iran
- Province: Fars
- County: Abadeh
- District: Bahman and Soghad
- Capital: Khosrow Shirin

Population (2016)
  - Total: 3,096
- Time zone: UTC+3:30 (IRST)

Khosrow Shirin Rural District (Persian: دهستان خسرو شيرين) is in Bahman and Soghad District of Abadeh County, Fars province, Iran. Its capital is the village of Khosrow Shirin.

== Demographics ==
=== Population ===
At the time of the 2006 National Census, the rural district's population (as a part of the Central District of Eqlid County) was 2,894 in 727 households. There were 3,094 inhabitants in 869 households at the following census of 2011, by which time the rural district had been separated from the county to join the Central District of Abadeh County. The 2016 census measured the population of the rural district as 3,096 in 921 households. The most populous of its 40 villages was Khosrow Shirin, with 1,969 people.

In 2018, the rural district was separated from the district in the formation of the Bahman and Soghad District.
