= Yaqubabad, Abyek =

Yaqubabad يعقوب اباد
- Village
- Location within Iran
- Coordinates: 35°59′52″N 50°23′20″E
- Country: Iran
- Province: Qazvin
- County: Abyek
- Bakhsh: Basharyat
- Rural District: Basharyat-e Sharqi

Population (2006)
  - Total: 46
- Time zone: UTC+3:30 (IRST)
  - Summer (DST): UTC+4:30 (IRDT)

Yaqubabad (Persian: يعقوب اباد, also Romanized as Ya‘qūbābād) is a village in Basharyat-e Sharqi Rural District, Basharyat District, Abyek County, Qazvin Province, Iran. At the 2006 census, its population was 46, in 11 families.
