= Firuzi, Bavanat =

Firuzi فيروزي
- Village
- Location within Iran
- Coordinates: 30°16′37″N 53°25′04″E
- Country: Iran
- Province: Fars
- County: Bavanat
- Bakhsh: Sarchehan
- Rural District: Bagh Safa

Population (2006)
  - Total: 54
- Time zone: UTC+3:30 (IRST)
  - Summer (DST): UTC+4:30 (IRDT)

Firuzi (Persian: فيروزي, also Romanized as Fīrūzī) is a village in Bagh Safa Rural District, Sarchehan District, Bavanat County, Fars province, Iran. At the 2006 census, its population was 54, in 13 families.
