= Soghad =

City in Fars province, Iran

Soghad Persian: صغاد
- City
- Location within Iran
- Coordinates: 31°11′28″N 52°31′00″E
- Country: Iran
- Province: Fars
- County: Abadeh
- District: Bahman and Soghad

Population (2016)
  - Total: 12,582
- Time zone: UTC+3:30 (IRST)

Soghad (Persian: صغاد) (Note: Also romanized as Şoghād; also known as Soqād and Sughāt) is a city in, and the capital of, Bahman and Soghad District of Abadeh County, Fars province, Iran.

== Demographics ==
=== Population ===
At the time of the 2006 National Census, the city's population was 11,065 in 3,001 households, when it was in the Central District. The following census in 2011 counted 11,156 people in 3,370 households. The 2016 census measured the population of the city as 12,582 people in 3,907 households.

In 2018, the city was separated from the district in the establishment of Bahman and Soghad District.
