= Eqbalabad-e Sisakht =

Eqbalabad-e Sisakht اقبال ابادسي سخت
- Village
- Location within Iran
- Coordinates: 30°50′33″N 51°28′34″E
- Country: Iran
- Province: Kohgiluyeh and Boyer-Ahmad
- County: Dana
- Bakhsh: Central
- Rural District: Dana

Population (2006)
  - Total: 89
- Time zone: UTC+3:30 (IRST)
  - Summer (DST): UTC+4:30 (IRDT)

Eqbalabad-e Sisakht (Persian: اقبال ابادسي سخت, also Romanized as Eqbālābād-e Sīsakht; also known as Eqbālābād) is a village in Dana Rural District, in the Central District of Dana County, Kohgiluyeh and Boyer-Ahmad Province, Iran. At the 2006 census, its population was 89, in 20 families.
