= Firuzi, Khorrambid =

Firuzi فیروزی
- Village
- Location within Iran
- Coordinates: 30°26′31″N 53°16′33″E
- Country: Iran
- Province: Fars
- County: Khorrambid
- Bakhsh: Mashhad-e Morghab
- Rural District: Shahidabad

Population (2006)
  - Total: 69
- Time zone: UTC+3:30 (IRST)
  - Summer (DST): UTC+4:30 (IRDT)

Firuzi (Persian: فیروزی, also Romanized as Fīrūzī; also known as Fīrūzī-ye Sar Tom) is a village in Shahidabad Rural District, Mashhad-e Morghab District, Khorrambid County, Fars province, Iran. At the 2006 census, its population was 69, in 13 families.
