= Najafabad-e Sorkhi =

Najafabad-e Sorkhi نجف ابادسرخي
- Village
- Location within Iran
- Coordinates: 29°12′33″N 52°28′58″E
- Country: Iran
- Province: Fars
- County: Firuzabad
- Bakhsh: Meymand
- Rural District: Khvajehei

Population (2006)
  - Total: 301
- Time zone: UTC+3:30 (IRST)
  - Summer (DST): UTC+4:30 (IRDT)

Najafabad-e Sorkhi (Persian: نجف ابادسرخي, also Romanized as Najafābād-e Sorkhī; also known as Najafābād) is a village in Khvajehei Rural District, Meymand District, Firuzabad County, Fars province, Iran. At the 2006 census, its population was 301, in 73 families.
