= Deh-e Bala, Bardsir =

Deh-e Bala ده بالا
- Village
- Location within Iran
- Coordinates: 29°36′43″N 56°30′27″E
- Country: Iran
- Province: Kerman
- County: Bardsir
- Bakhsh: Central
- Rural District: Mashiz

Population (2006)
  - Total: 887
- Time zone: UTC+3:30 (IRST)
  - Summer (DST): UTC+4:30 (IRDT)

Deh-e Bala (Persian: ده بالا, also Romanized as Deh-e Bālā; also known as Dehbālā Bīdkhān) is a village in Mashiz Rural District, in the Central District of Bardsir County, Kerman Province, Iran. At the 2006 census, its population was 887, in 219 families.
