= Deh-e Bala, Shahr-e Babak =

Village in Kerman, Iran

Deh-e Bala ده بالا
- Village
- Location within Iran
- Coordinates: 30°13′35″N 55°28′12″E
- Country: Iran
- Province: Kerman
- County: Shahr-e Babak
- Bakhsh: Central
- Rural District: Meymand

Population (2006)
  - Total: 22
- Time zone: UTC+3:30 (IRST)
  - Summer (DST): UTC+4:30 (IRDT)

Deh-e Bala (Persian: ده بالا, also Romanized as Deh-e Bālā) is a village in Meymand Rural District, in the Central District of Shahr-e Babak County, Kerman Province, Iran. At the 2006 census, its population was 22, in 4 families.
