= Badaki, Marvdasht =

Badaki بادكي
- Village
- Location within Iran
- Coordinates: 29°54′41″N 52°44′59″E
- Country: Iran
- Province: Fars
- County: Marvdasht
- Bakhsh: Central
- Rural District: Rudbal

Population (2006)
  - Total: 152
- Time zone: UTC+3:30 (IRST)
  - Summer (DST): UTC+4:30 (IRDT)

Badaki (Persian: بادكي, also Romanized as Bādakī and Bādekī; also known as Madavai) is a village in Rudbal Rural District, in the Central District of Marvdasht County, Fars province, Iran. At the 2006 census, its population was 152, in 33 families.
