= Najafabad, Aligudarz =

Najafabad نجف اباد
- Village
- Location within Iran
- Coordinates: 33°13′36″N 49°09′46″E
- Country: Iran
- Province: Lorestan
- County: Aligudarz
- Bakhsh: Zaz and Mahru
- Rural District: Zaz-e Sharqi

Population (2006)
  - Total: 143
- Time zone: UTC+3:30 (IRST)
  - Summer (DST): UTC+4:30 (IRDT)

Najafabad (Persian: نجف اباد, also Romanized as Najafābād) is a village in Zaz-e Sharqi Rural District, Zaz and Mahru District, Aligudarz County, Lorestan Province, Iran. At the 2006 census, its population was 143, in 23 families.
