= Eqlid =

City in Fars province, Iran

Eqlid Persian: اقلید
- City
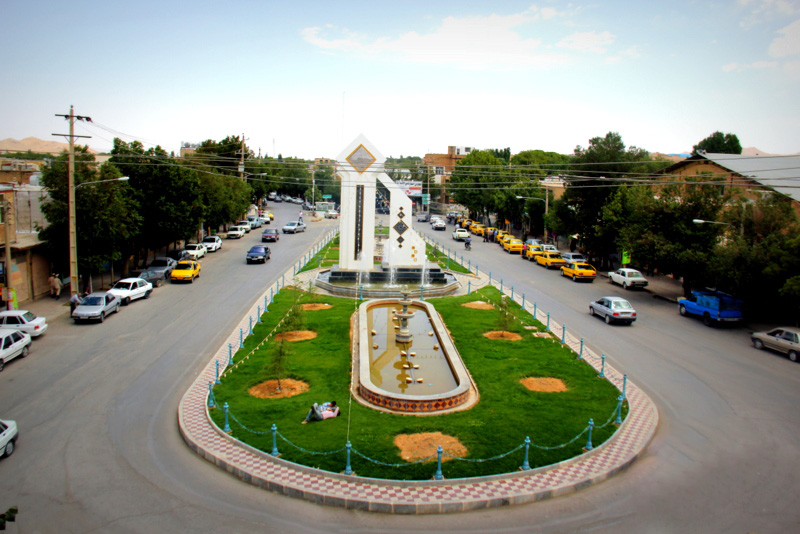

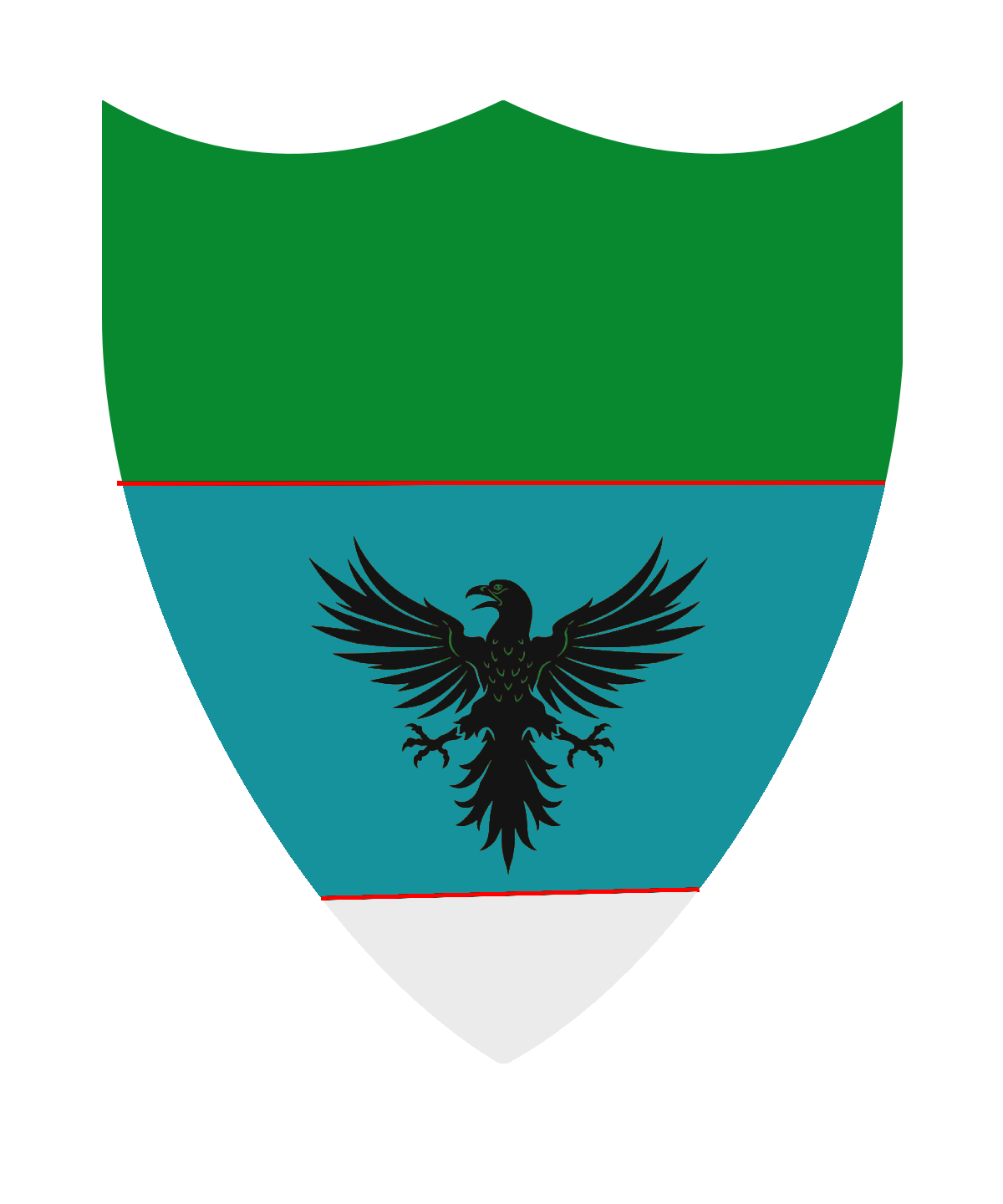
- Coat of arms

- Location within Iran
- Coordinates: 30°53′34″N 52°41′20″E
- Country: Iran
- Province: Fars
- County: Eqlid
- District: Central

Population (2016)
  - Total: 44,341
- Time zone: UTC+3:30 (IRST)
- Area code: 0752-422

Eqlid (Persian: اقلید) (Note: Also romanized as Eqlīd and Iqlīd; also known as Eklīd) is a city in the Central District of Eqlid County, Fars province, Iran, serving as capital of both the county and the district.

== Historical background ==
During the Achaemenid Empire its name was Azargarta.(source: Parto-e vahid dar asrare takhte jamshid پرتو وحید در اسرار تخت جمشید)

Legend says that Eghlid was built by three brothers called Elias, Aslam, and Orjam. There are three main neighborhood (which used to be three castles) in Eghlid bearing the name of these three brothers: Eliasan, Aslaman, Orjaman.

== Etymology ==
In the local dialect of Eqlid, the city’s name is pronounced as Kilil, a phonetic evolution from the formal Eqlid due to regional sound shifts.

Several theories have been proposed regarding the origin of the name:

1. Greek origin hypothesis: Some linguists suggest that Eqlid derives from the Ancient Greek root kleis or kleid-, meaning “key.” This root appears in many European languages, including French (clé), English (key), and German (Schlüssel). Based on this theory, Eqlid may have been called the “key to Fars” due to its strategic location at a crossroads between northern, central, and southern Iran.

2. Indigenous Iranian origin hypothesis: Other scholars, including Ahmad Tadayyon, argue that Eqlid or Kilil is rooted in Middle Persian or older Iranian languages. Words such as kil, kilil, and klaw historically referred to gateways, passes, or openers. In the local vernacular, kilid still carries the meaning of “gateway” or “access point,” beyond just a tool for opening locks.

3. Mythological–cultural hypothesis: Another theory links the name Kilil to the Mesopotamian goddess Kilili, who was worshipped alongside Ishtar as a deity of love and fertility. After Cyrus the Great conquered Babylon, elements of Babylonian culture, art, and architecture were introduced into the Fars region. It is possible that the name Kilil entered the local lexicon during this period of cultural exchange.

Taken together, these theories suggest that the name Eqlid reflects a rich and layered linguistic and cultural history.

== Demographics ==
=== Population ===
At the time of the 2006 National Census, the city's population was 49,709 in 10,214 households. The following census in 2011 counted 44,552 people in 12,435 households. The 2016 census measured the population of the city as 44,341 people in 13,210 households.

مردم این شهر اصالتا از قوم پارس میباشند

== Geography ==
Eqlid is 22 km west of the Expressway between Isfahan and Shiraz. It is close to the mountain chain of Zagros and has one of the highest elevations (a mountain peak known as Bel) among Iran cities (2250 meters).

It is also close to the desert city of Abarqu, making it a city in the border of high mountain and desert. It has a dry and cold weather, and some of its mountain peaks are covered by snow throughout the year. It is an agriculture city and its main products are wheat, barley, potato and fruits like grapes, walnut, apple, and pear. Its main road is Emam Khomeini Boulevard.

=== Climate ===
Eqlid has a hot-summer Mediterranean climate (Csa) according to the Köppen climate classification.

Climate data for Eqlid (1995-2010 normals)
Month	Jan	Feb	Mar	Apr	May	Jun	Jul	Aug	Sep	Oct	Nov	Dec	Year
Daily mean °C (°F)	1.3 (34.3)	4.1 (39.4)	7.8 (46.0)	12.4 (54.3)	17.1 (62.8)	21.3 (70.3)	23.7 (74.7)	22.1 (71.8)	19.2 (66.6)	14.2 (57.6)	7.8 (46.0)	3.9 (39.0)	12.9 (55.2)
Average precipitation mm (inches)	69.8 (2.75)	52.0 (2.05)	65.9 (2.59)	37.4 (1.47)	5.9 (0.23)	1.8 (0.07)	1.3 (0.05)	0.3 (0.01)	0.2 (0.01)	3.2 (0.13)	18.0 (0.71)	59.7 (2.35)	315.5 (12.42)
Source: IRIMO

== Universities and higher education ==
The following universities and centers are located in Euclid:

- Islamic Azad University
- Payam Noor Uni of Eghlid
- Eghlid University
- Eghlid Higher Education Center

== See also ==
- Aba Saleh al-Mahdi tunnel
- Seyyed Mohammad Bagher Movahed Abtahi
