= Najafabad, Tehran =

Najafabad نجفاباد
- Village
- Location within Iran
- Coordinates: 35°10′25″N 51°40′35″E
- Country: Iran
- Province: Tehran
- County: Varamin
- Bakhsh: Javadabad
- Rural District: Behnamarab-e Jonubi

Population (2006)
  - Total: 260
- Time zone: UTC+3:30 (IRST)
  - Summer (DST): UTC+4:30 (IRDT)

Najafabad (Persian: نجفاباد, also Romanized as Najafābād) is a village in Behnamarab-e Jonubi Rural District, Javadabad District, Varamin County, Tehran Province, Iran. At the 2006 census, its population was 260, in 55 families.
