= Deh-e Bala, Rudbar-e Jonubi =

Village in Kerman, Iran

Deh-e Bala ده بالا
- Village
- Location within Iran
- Coordinates: 28°02′46″N 58°30′24″E
- Country: Iran
- Province: Kerman
- County: Rudbar-e Jonubi
- Bakhsh: Jazmurian
- Rural District: Kuhestan

Population (2006)
  - Total: 95
- Time zone: UTC+3:30 (IRST)
  - Summer (DST): UTC+4:30 (IRDT)

Deh-e Bala (Persian: ده بالا, also Romanized as Deh-e Bālā and Deh Bālā) is a village in Kuhestan Rural District, Jazmurian District, Rudbar-e Jonubi County, Kerman Province, Iran. At the 2006 census, its population was 95, in 30 families.
