= Firuzi, Razavi Khorasan =

Firuzi فيروزي
- Village
- Location within Iran
- Coordinates: 36°08′51″N 58°56′29″E
- Country: Iran
- Province: Razavi Khorasan
- County: Nishapur
- Bakhsh: Central
- Rural District: Fazl

Population (2006)
  - Total: 31
- Time zone: UTC+3:30 (IRST)
  - Summer (DST): UTC+4:30 (IRDT)

Firuzi (Persian: فيروزي, also Romanized as Fīrūzī) is a village in Fazl Rural District, in the Central District of Nishapur County, Razavi Khorasan Province, Iran. At the 2006 census, its population was 31, in 10 families.
