= Bahman Rural District =

Rural district in Fars province, Iran

Bahman Rural District Persian: دهستان بهمن
- Rural District
- Location within Iran
- Coordinates: 31°12′04″N 52°17′35″E
- Country: Iran
- Province: Fars
- County: Abadeh
- District: Bahman and Soghad
- Capital: Bahman

Population (2016)
  - Total: 4,135
- Time zone: UTC+3:30 (IRST)

Bahman Rural District (Persian: دهستان بهمن) is in Bahman and Soghad District of Abadeh County, Fars province, Iran. It is administered from the city of Bahman.

== Demographics ==
=== Population ===
At the time of the 2006 National Census, the rural district's population (as a part of the Central District) was 2,024 in 497 households. There were 4,787 inhabitants in 850 households at the following census of 2011. The 2016 census measured the population of the rural district as 4,135 in 981 households. The most populous of its 103 villages was Heshmatiyeh, with 2,868 people.

In 2018, the rural district was separated from the district in the establishment of Bahman and Soghad District.
