= Bahman and Soghad District =

District in Fars province, Iran

Bahman and Soghad District Persian: بخش بهمن صغاد
- District
- Location within Iran
- Coordinates: 31°06′00″N 52°13′45″E
- Country: Iran
- Province: Fars
- County: Abadeh
- Capital: Soghad
- Time zone: UTC+3:30 (IRST)

Bahman and Soghad District (Persian: بخش بهمن صغاد) is in Abadeh County, Fars province, Iran. Its capital is the city of Soghad, whose population at the time of the 2016 National Census was 12,582 people in 3,907 households.

== History ==
After the 2006 National Census, Khosrow Shirin Rural District was separated from Eqlid County to join the Central District. In July 2018, Bahman and Khosrow Shirin Rural Districts, and the cities of Bahman and Soghad, were separated from the district in the formation of Bahman and Soghad District.

== Demographics ==
=== Administrative divisions ===
Bahman and Soghad District
Administrative Divisions
Bahman RD
Khosrow Shirin RD
Bahman (city)
Soghad (city)
RD = Rural District
