= Kordshuli (tribe) =

The Kordshuli tribe (Kurdish: Kurdşûlî, lit. 'Kurdish villagers') is a nomadic and pastoral Kurdish tribe in Fars province in Iran. Their main settlement is Khonjesht.

== History ==
The tribe settled in Fars province in the 19th century. They speak Laki and were briefly part of the Qashqai confederation, but became independent again in the beginning of the 20th century.

== Population ==
In 1960, the Kordshuli population numbered around 600 households, and most still live a nomadic lifestyle. In the 1970s, they numbered 353 households, of which 296 were nomadic.
