= Khonjesht Rural District =

Rural district in Fars province, Iran

Khonjesht Rural District Persian: دهستان خنجشت
- Rural District
- Location within Iran
- Coordinates: 30°44′37″N 52°42′18″E
- Country: Iran
- Province: Fars
- County: Eqlid
- District: Central
- Capital: Khonjesht

Population (2016)
  - Total: 9,687
- Time zone: UTC+3:30 (IRST)

Khonjesht Rural District (Persian: دهستان خنجشت) is in the Central District of Eqlid County, Fars province, Iran. Its capital is the village of Khonjesht.

== Demographics ==
=== Population ===
At the time of the 2006 National Census, the rural district's population was 8,385 in 1,793 households. There were 8,619 inhabitants in 2,090 households at the following census of 2011. The 2016 census measured the population of the rural district as 9,687 in 2,788 households. The most populous of its 115 villages was Cheshmeh Rana, with 2,714 people.
