= Surmaq Rural District =

Rural district in Fars province, Iran

Surmaq Rural District Persian: دهستان سورمق
- Rural District
- Location within Iran
- Coordinates: 30°57′28″N 53°00′38″E
- Country: Iran
- Province: Fars
- County: Abadeh
- District: Central
- Capital: Surmaq

Population (2016)
  - Total: 623
- Time zone: UTC+3:30 (IRST)

Surmaq Rural District (Persian: دهستان سورمق) is in the Central District of Abadeh County, Fars province, Iran. It is administered from the city of Surmaq.

== Demographics ==
=== Population ===
At the time of the 2006 National Census, the rural district's population was 388 in 118 households. There were 761 inhabitants in 250 households at the following census of 2011. The 2016 census measured the population of the rural district as 623 in 207 households. The most populous of its 42 villages was Amirabad, with 304 people.
