= Bidak Rural District =

Rural district in Fars province, Iran

Bidak Rural District Persian: دهستان بيدك
- Rural District
- Location within Iran
- Coordinates: 31°17′33″N 52°37′00″E
- Country: Iran
- Province: Fars
- County: Abadeh
- District: Central
- Capital: Bidak

Population (2016)
  - Total: 4,740
- Time zone: UTC+3:30 (IRST)

Bidak Rural District (Persian: دهستان بيدك) is in the Central District of Abadeh County, Fars province, Iran. Its capital is the village of Bidak.

== Demographics ==
=== Population ===
At the time of the 2006 National Census, the rural district's population was 4,715 in 1,260 households. There were 5,005 inhabitants in 1,468 households at the following census of 2011. The 2016 census measured the population of the rural district as 4,740 in 1,475 households. The most populous of its 48 villages was Bidak, with 2,507 people.
