= Shahr Meyan Rural District =

Rural district in Fars province, Iran

Shahr Meyan Rural District Persian: دهستان شهرميان
- Rural District
- Location within Iran
- Coordinates: 30°50′30″N 52°22′20″E
- Country: Iran
- Province: Fars
- County: Eqlid
- District: Central
- Capital: Shahr Meyan

Population (2016)
  - Total: 3,847
- Time zone: UTC+3:30 (IRST)

Shahr Meyan Rural District (Persian: دهستان شهرميان) is in the Central District of Eqlid County, Fars province, Iran. Its capital is the village of Shahr Meyan.

== Demographics ==
=== Population ===
At the time of the 2006 National Census, the rural district's population was 4,810 in 1,049 households. There were 3,634 inhabitants in 956 households at the following census of 2011. The 2016 census measured the population of the rural district as 3,847 in 1,152 households. The most populous of its 106 villages was Ab Barik, with 1,521 people.
