= Central District (Abadeh County) =

District in Fars province, Iran

Central District (Abadeh County) Persian: بخش مرکزی شهرستان آباده
- District
- Location within Iran
- Coordinates: 31°20′00″N 52°27′15″E
- Country: Iran
- Province: Fars
- County: Abadeh
- Capital: Abadeh

Population (2016)
  - Total: 100,831
- Time zone: UTC+3:30 (IRST)

The Central District of Abadeh County (Persian: بخش مرکزی شهرستان آباده) is in Fars province, Iran. Its capital is the city of Abadeh.

== History ==
After the 2006 National Census, Khosrow Shirin Rural District was separated from Eqlid County to join the district. In July 2018, Bahman and Khosrow Shirin Rural Districts, and the cities of Bahman and Soghad, were separated from the district in the formation of Bahman and Soghad District.

== Demographics ==
=== Population ===
At the time of the 2006 census, the district's population was 87,203 in 23,387 households. The following census in 2011 counted 92,957 people in 28,463 households. The 2016 census measured the population of the district as 100,831 inhabitants in 31,672 households.

=== Administrative divisions ===
Central District (Abadeh County) Population
Administrative Divisions	2006	2011	2016
Bahman RD (Note: Transferred to Bahman and Soghad District after the 2016 census)	2,024	4,787	4,135
Bidak RD	4,715	5,005	4,740
Izadkhast RD	(Note: Below the reporting threshold)	101	0
Khosrow Shirin RD (Note: Transferred from Eqlid County)		3,094	3,096
Surmaq RD	388	761	623
Abadeh (city)	52,042	55,758	59,116
Bahman (city)	6,484	7,305	7,568
Izadkhast (city)	7,366	6,532	5,910
Soghad (city)	11,065	11,156	12,582
Surmaq (city)	3,116	3,458	3,050
Total	87,203	97,957	100,831
RD = Rural District
