= Abadeh County =

County in Fars province, Iran

Abadeh County Persian: شهرستان آباده
- County
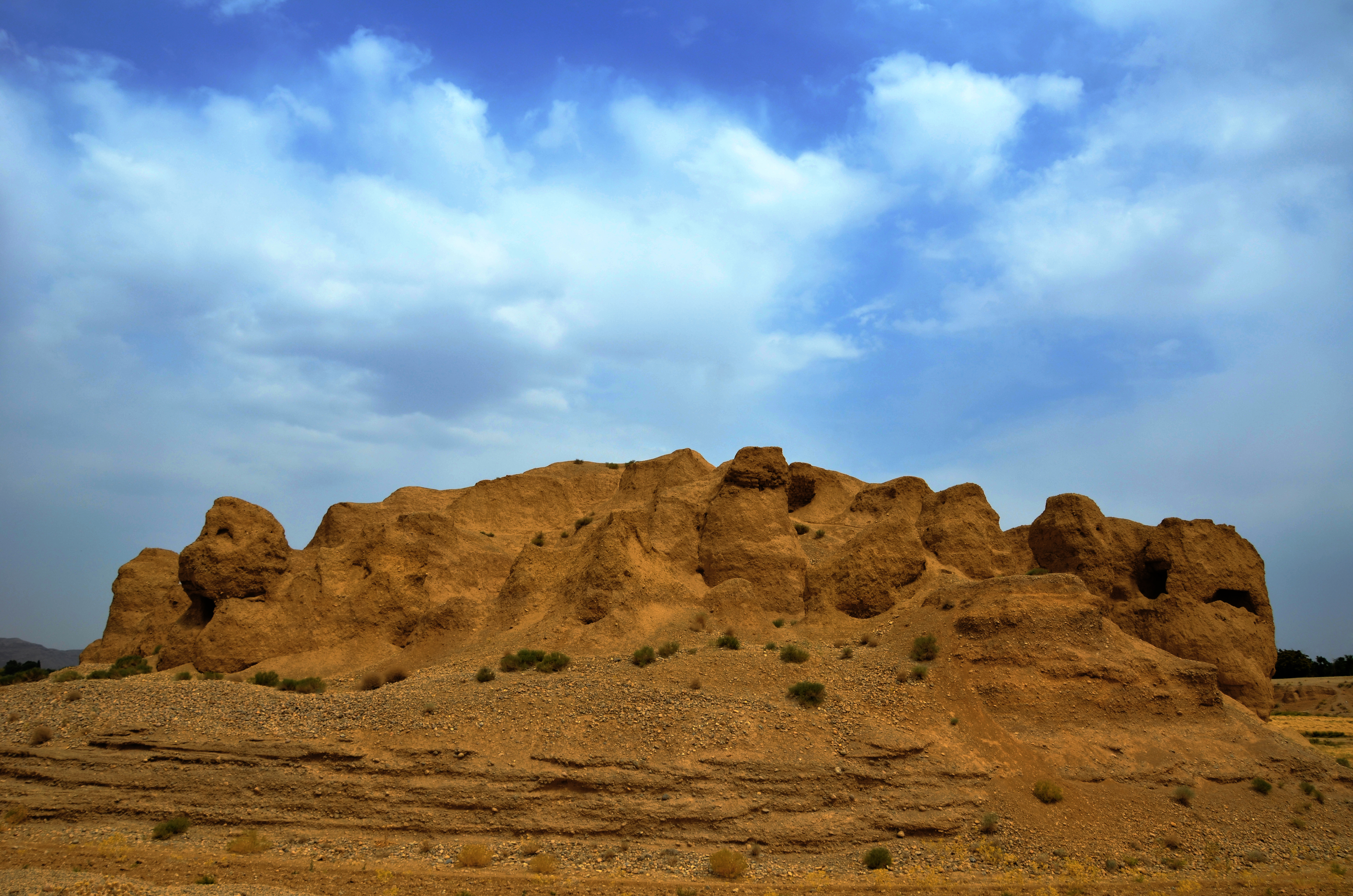

- Location of Abadeh County in Fars province (top, purple)

- Location of Fars province in Iran
- Coordinates: 31°15′N 52°31′E
- Country: Iran
- Province: Fars
- Capital: Abadeh
- Districts: Central, Bahman and Soghad

Population (2016)
  - Total: 100,831
- Time zone: UTC+3:30 (IRST)

Abadeh County (Persian: شهرستان آباده) is in Fars province, Iran. Its capital is the city of Abadeh.

== History ==
After the 2006 National Census, Khosrow Shirin Rural District was separated from Eqlid County to join the Central District. In July 2018, Bahman and Khosrow Shirin Rural Districts, and the cities of Bahman and Soghad, were separated from the district in the formation of Bahman and Soghad District.

== Demographics ==
=== Population ===
At the time of the 2006 census, the county's population was 87,203 in 23,387 households. The following census in 2011 counted 98,188 people in 28,501 households. The 2016 census measured the population of the county as 100,831 in 31,672 households. It is the most populous county in northern Fars province.

=== Administrative divisions ===
Abadeh County's population history and administrative structure over three consecutive censuses are shown in the following table.

Abadeh County Population
Administrative Divisions	2006	2011	2016
Central District	87,203	97,957	100,831
Bahman RD	2,024	4,787	4,135
Bidak RD	4,715	5,005	4,740
Izadkhast RD	(Note: Below the reporting threshold)	101	0
Khosrow Shirin RD (Note: Transferred from Eqlid County)		3,094	3,096
Surmaq RD	388	761	623
Abadeh (city)	52,042	55,758	59,116
Bahman (city)	6,484	7,305	7,568
Izadkhast (city)	7,366	6,532	5,910
Soghad (city)	11,065	11,156	12,582
Surmaq (city)	3,116	3,458	3,050
Bahman and Soghad District (Note: Established after the 2016 census)			
Bahman RD			
Khosrow Shirin RD			
Bahman (city)			
Soghad (city)			
Total	87,203	98,188	100,831
RD = Rural District

== See also ==
Media related to Abadeh County at Wikimedia Commons
