= Central District (Eqlid County) =

District in Fars province, Iran

Central District (Eqlid County) Persian: بخش مرکزی شهرستان اقلید
- District
- Location within Iran
- Coordinates: 30°46′16″N 52°31′04″E
- Country: Iran
- Province: Fars
- County: Eqlid
- Capital: Eqlid

Population (2016)
  - Total: 57,875
- Time zone: UTC+3:30 (IRST)

The Central District of Eqlid County (Persian: بخش مرکزی شهرستان اقلید) is in Fars province, Iran. Its capital is the city of Eqlid.

== History ==
After the 2006 National Census, Khosrow Shirin Rural District was separated from the district to join Abadeh County.

== Demographics ==
=== Population ===
At the time of the 2006 census, the district's population was 65,798 in 13,783 households. The following census in 2011 counted 56,805 people in 15,481 households. The 2016 census measured the population of the district as 57,875 inhabitants in 17,150 households.

=== Administrative divisions ===
Central District (Eqlid County) Population
Administrative Divisions	2006	2011	2016
Khonjesht RD	8,385	8,619	9,687
Khosrow Shirin RD (Note: Transferred to Abadeh County)	2,894		
Shahr Meyan RD	4,810	3,634	3,847
Eqlid (city)	49,709	44,552	44,341
Total	65,798	56,805	57,875
RD = Rural District
