= 1929 in Iran =

- Decades
- See also: Other events of 1929; Years in Iran

The following lists events that happened during 1929 in Pahlavi Iran.

== Incumbents ==
- Shah: Reza Shah
- Prime Minister: Mehdi Qoli Hedayat

== Events ==
- May 1 – 1929 Kopet Dag earthquake.
- September 6 – 1929 Jask Imperial Airways de Havilland Hercules crash.

== Births ==
- January 7 – Manuchehr Jamali, Iranian philosopher, writer and philologist.
- January 11 – Abdol Majid Majidi, Iranian politician.
- January 21 – Alinaghi Alikhani, Iranian economist.
- January 28 – Ali Mirzaei (weightlifter), Iranian weightlifter.
- February 3 – Boyuk Jeddikar, Iranian footballer.
- March 9 – Gholam Hossein Mobaser, Iranian sports shooter.
- March 16 – Farrokhlagha Houshmand, Iranian actress.
- March 21 – Seifollah Kambakhshfard, Iranian archaeologist.
- March 23 – Nusrat Bhutto, Iranian-born Pakistani politician.
- March 25 – Shahpour Zarnegar, Iranian fencer.
- April 5 – Mahmoud Mollaghasemi, Olympic wrestler.
- April 20 – Nasser Rastegar-Nejad, Iranian songwriter.
- May 12 – Samuel Rahbar, Iranian biologist.
- May 24 – Amir Shervan, Iranian filmmaker.
- May 31 – Fakhri Khorvash, Iranian actor.
- June 6 – Nader Naderpour, Iranian poet.
- June 15 – Lotfi Mansouri, Opera director, manager.
- June 25 – Ali Tabrizli, Iranian poet and writer.
- June 28 – Abolhassan Najafi, Iranian writer and translator.
- July 1 – Parviz Koozehkanani, Iranian footballer.
- July 2 – Maxime Feri Farzaneh, Franco-Iranian writer and film maker.
- July 22 – George V. Chilingar, American geologist.
- July 29 – Monireh Gorji, Iranian politician.
- August 4 – Mohammad Paziraei, Iranian wrestler.
- August 8 – Hormoz Farhat, Iranian musician.
- August 20 – Farhad Sepahbody, Iranian diplomat.
- August 23 – Badr al-Zaman Gharib, Iranian linguist.
- August 23 – Najaf Daryabandari, Iranian writer.
- September 6 – Amir Timur Portrab, musician.
- September 6 – Cyrus Atabay, Iranian-German translator and poet.
- November 7 – Asghar Zoghian, Iranian amateur wrestler.
- November 11 – Cyrus Ghani, Iranian film critic.
- November 22 – Farrokh Saidi, Iranian academic.
- November 23 – Vigen (entertainer), Iranian singer and actor.
- December 22 – Mohammad Nouri (singer), Iranian pop singer from Tehran.
- ? – Ali Davani, Iranian scholar.
- ? – Allah Verdi Mirza Farman Farmaian, Qajar prince.
- ? – Benik Amirian, Iranian-Armenian alpine skier.
- ? – Esfandiar Ahmadieh, Iranian animation filmmaker.
- ? – Gholamreza Kianpour, Iranian politician.

== Deaths ==
- April 15 – Kamran Mirza Nayeb es-Saltaneh, Iranian field marshal.
- ? – Abdol-samad Mirza Ezz ed-Dowleh, Qajar prince.
- ? – Kashef as-Saltaneh, Iranian diplomat and politician.
- ? – Javad Sa'd al-Dowleh, Iranian politician.
