= ISME =

ISME may refer to:

- International Society for Microbial Ecology
- Iranian Society of Mechanical Engineers
- International Society for Music Education
- International School for Medical Science and Engineering
- International School of Management Excellence

isme may refer to:

- a catalogue and mail order brand in the Shop Direct Group
