= Alborz High School =

Public high school in Tehran, Iran

Coordinates: 35°42′09.97″N 51°24′40.59″E

Alborz Mandegar High School
- دبیرستان ماندگار البرز
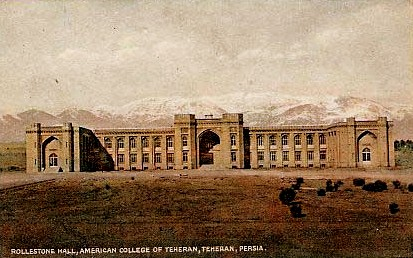

Location
- College Crossroad, Enqelab Street; Tehran; Iran

Information
- Other names: American College of Tehran, Alborz College
- School type: Public (Gifted)
- Founded: 1873; 153 years ago
- Founder: James Bassett
- Principal: Mohammad Mohammadi
- Grades: 10–12
- Enrollment: 1,850
- Campuses: 1985–now: Heart of Tehran (Alborz College) 1929–1985: Alborz (American) College, current campus 1922–1929: American School, current campus 1887–1922: American School, Qavam ol-Saltaneh (nowadays: 30 Tir) 1873–1887: American Catholic School, Darvazeh Qazvin 1871–1873: Atabac Building, Lalehzar
- Campus size: 1985–now: 18.5 acres (7.5 ha) 1922–1985: 40 acres (16 ha) 1873–1922: Undefined
- Campus type: Urban
- Alumni: Alborzi
- Website: MandegarAlborz.sch.ir

Alborz High School (Persian: دبیرستان ماندگار البرز) is a college-preparatory gifted high school located in the heart of Tehran, Iran. It is one of the first modern high schools in Asia and the Middle East, named after the Alborz mountain range, north of Tehran. Its place in the shaping of Iran's intellectual elite compares with that of Eton College in England and institutions such as Phillips Academy, Phillips Exeter Academy, and Milton Academy in the United States.

== History ==
The school was founded as an elementary school in 1873 by a group of American Presbyterian missionaries led by James Bassett. This was in the 26th year of the reign of Naser al-Din Shah Qajar, 22 years after Amir Kabir founded the Dar al-Fonun in Tehran, and 33 years before the Persian Constitutional Revolution.

When Dr. Samuel M. Jordan arrived in Iran in 1898, he instituted change; subsequently, Alborz became a 12-year elementary and secondary school, with its share of college courses. Thereafter, the institution came to be known as the American College of Tehran.

Dr. Jordan remained president of Alborz for 42 years (1899–1940). During his tenure, Alborz grew from an elementary school to a high school and a college.

In 1932, the school received a permanent charter from the Board of Regents of the State University of New York.

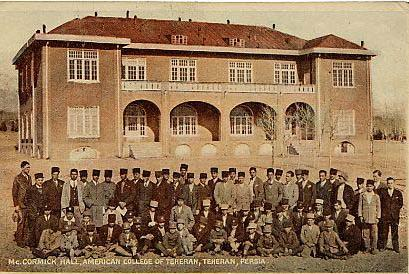
McCormick Hall, American College of Tehran, circa 1930. The school received a permanent charter from the Board of Regents of the University of the State of New York in 1932.

In 1940 and during World War II, by the order of Reza Shah, Alborz was removed from American management and placed under the auspices of the Iranian Ministry of Education as part of Reza Shah's modernisation reforms. The school's name was changed from "College" back to "Alborz", and it was reinstated as a high school.

In 1944, Professor Mohammad Ali Mojtahedi, member of University of Tehran's faculty, was appointed as the president of Alborz.

=== Mandegar Title ===
In Iran, schools and educational centers that have been operating for more than 80 years and have good records of educating students are granted the Mandegar prefix (Persian: ماندگار, meaning: lasting) by the Iran Ministry of Education. Mandegar prefix was granted to Alborz High School in 2006 according to the conditions set by the IRI Ministry of Education.

== Structure ==
Alborz High School is a public school and is managed by a special board of directors that includes the heads of the IRI Ministry of Education and the head of the Education, Research and Technology Commission of the IRI Council along with number of other officials of Iran.

Alborz High School has 4 majors: Natural Sciences, Mathematics and Physics, Humanities and Literature, and Humanities and Theology at the high school level. Each field has a different building with experienced high-ranking teachers and supervisors who specialize in educational goals.

== Honours and Alumni ==
Alborz students have won more than 300 medals in the International Science Olympiads and scientific competitions.

== Admission ==
According to the special goals of the school, prospective students must meet entrance exam requirements before being allowed to enroll in the school.

These conditions are:

- Excellent academic records and high grades in elementary and middle school
- Excellent scientific records and appropriate experience in the fields of Olympiads, competitions and festivals
- Obtaining the quorum in the exam (above 75%) on the condition of obtaining the minimum admission rank in the each special major entrance exam: 150 (Natural Sciencec), 300 (Mathematics and Physics), 120 (Humanities)

If the above items are accepted:

- Accepted in the scientific interview
- Accepted in the cultural-religious interview
- Accepted in the specialized interview of the continuing education program

After the initial admission, the students enter the summer program. This program lasts for 5 weeks and the students are evaluated under the supervision of a group of academic advisors and high school education specialists; if students get the minimum grade (60% B) in «natural sciences» and «mathematics and physics». or (50% C) in «humanities», their acceptance will be final approval. Top students are exempted from this condition in initial admission, but they are required to participate in the summer program.

The admission process of students in Alborz High School is carried out in cooperation with the General Department of Education of Tehran, the Education Commission of the IRI Council and the Vice President of Scientific Technology of Islamic Republic of Iran.

== Educational path ==
In Alborz High School, there are several paths for high school education, so that every student after passing the first part of the admission (Entrance Test and Requirements) and the first two parts of the interview, during his third interview, he is obliged to choose his educational path. The educational paths of Alborz and their selection percentage are:

- Konkour (Iranian National Universities Entrance Exam) (63%)
- Olympiads and scientific competitions (12%)
- Cultural and religious competitions and festivals (10%)
- Competitions and festivals of technology and invention (10%)
- Common - undecided (5%)

== Elmialborz Institute ==
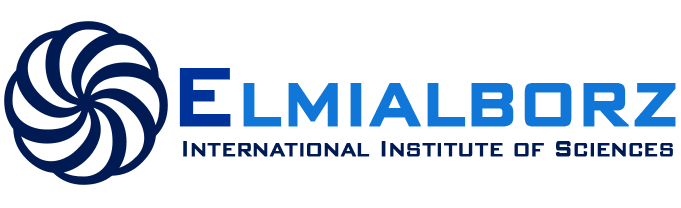
Logo of Elmialborz

Elmialborz was a group that was formed by the first secondary (middle school) students of Alborz High School and from a student group it was able to reach a scientific and educational institution with more than 250 active members in several countries.

=== Foundation ===
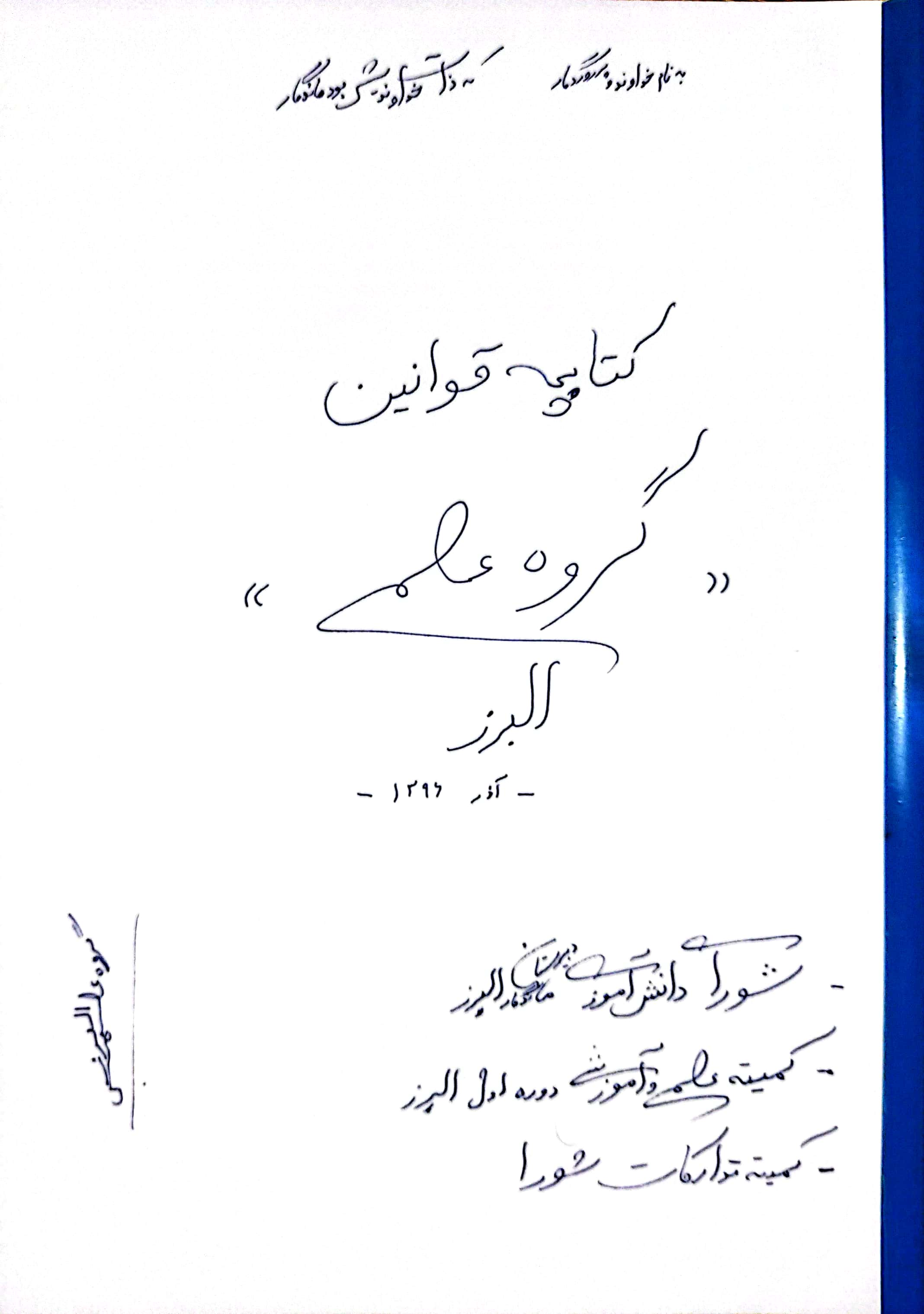
Booklet of Elmialborz Laws First handwrite edition

In November 2017, after completing the writing of the Law of the Science Group of Alborz at the monthly meeting of the members of the Alborz Student Council, the scientific committee of the Student Council officially announced the start of the activity of this group.

=== Independence ===
At the beginning of 2019, i.e. about a year after its establishment, with the approval of the Alborz Student Council, the Alborz Scientific Committee became independent from this council and started working together with the higher scientific committee of the school and the Alborz Scientific Group, and thus the activity of this group became stronger.

=== After the dissolution of the middle school ===
After the dissolution of the first secondary school (middle school) of Alborz High School and this action coincided with the corona pandemic, this group was drastically reduced. This was when the members of the leadership group of this group made a new decision: to join the student scientific committee to the higher scientific committee and to transform the group into a professional structure.

This turned a small group into a free educational institution for the public, and through the association of the Higher Scientific Committee, it was able to establish connections with other schools and institutions in other cities and provinces.

== Facilities and Buildings ==
Sources

- Central building (now:Soleymani building) «Educational and Administrative»
- Valizadeh building «Educational»
- Isargaran building «Educational and Administrative»
- Nuclear Martyrs Complex (1-st floor: Library, reading room, reference book library, workshop site, computer site, rest room, prayer room | 2-nd floor: laboratories of general biology, specialized biology, condensation physics, mechanical physics, organic chemistry, mineral chemistry and research workshop | 3-rd floor: Motahari exam hall)
- Natural grass field (Football ground | Spectators section and dressing room)
- Artificial grass field
- Dezfulian sports complex (1-st floor: Futsal-basketball multipurpose hall, gym, ping pong hall 1, Bathroom and dressing room | 2-nd floor: Spectators section, lounge and ping pong hall 2)
- Restaurant (Teachers, Students)
- Bagheral Uloom building (library, prayer hall)
- Jordan House Museum
- Education-research complex (1-st floor: Clinic and Administrative | 2-nd floor: High school performance evaluation department | 3-rd floor: Education and Planning departments | 4-th floor: Olympiad and Research departments)
- Fakhrizadeh Research Center
- Humanities library
- Rajai meeting hall
- Artificial lake and Park 1 (with animals)
- Park 2 (Garden)
- Volleyball and Handball fields
- Central Yard (Speech and ceremony yard)

== Alborz Principals/Deans ==
Sources

- Mr. Howard (1873–1889)
- Dr. Samuel M. Jordan (1899–1940)
- Mr. Mohammad Vahid Tonekaboni (1940–1941)
- Mr. Mohsen Haddad (1941)
- Mr. Ali Mohammad Partovi (1941–1942)
- Mr. Hasan Zoghi (1942–1943)
- Mr. Lotf Ali Sooratgar (1943–1944)
- Prof. Mohammad Ali Mojtahedi (1944–1978)
- Mr. Hossein Khoshnevisan (1978–1979)
- Mr. Hasan Pour Zahed (1979–1980)
- Mr. Naser Naseri (1980–1981)
- Mr. Ismael Sadegh Kazemi (1981–1985)
- Mr. Rajab Ali Yasipour (1985–1986)
- Mr. Naser Molla Asadollah (1986)
- Mr. Ali Mazarei (1986–1988)
- Mr. Abbas Feiz (1988–1989)
- Mr. Hossein Khoshnevisan (1989–1991)
- Mr. Mohammad Bagher Dezfulian (1991–1997)
- Mr. Mahmoud Dastani (1998–1999)
- Mr. Valiollah Sanaye (1999–2007)
- Dr. Mazaher Hami Kargar (2007–2011)
- Dr. Abeth Esfandiar (2011–2012)
- Mr. Mohammad Mohammadi (2012–present)

== Notable Alborz Deans ==
- Dr. Mahmoud Behzad

== Notable alumni ==
=== Politicians ===
Sources

- Mostafa Chamran (1932–1981), minister of National Defence and chief of Islamic Revolution Guard Corps (IRGC)
- Amir Farshad Ebrahimi (born 1975), political activist
- Mansoor Hekmat (1951–2002), political activist
- Ataollah Khosravani, politician
- Mostafa Mir-Salim (born 1947), politician
- Tahmasb Mazaheri (born 1953), politician
- Parviz C. Radji (1936–2014), Iranian ambassador to the United Kingdom

=== Military personnel ===
Sources

- Mohammad Amir Khatami (1920–1975), commander in chief of Imperial Iranian Air Force (IIAF) (1958–1975)

=== Scholars ===
Sources

- Solayman Haïm (1887–1970), lexicographer and translator
- Manouchehr Sotoudeh (1913–2016), professor of geography
- Mahmoud Behzad (1914–2007), professor of biology
- Sadeq Chubak (1916–1998), author
- Lotfi A. Zadeh (1921–2017), mathematician and professor of computer science
- Mohammad Jafar Mahjoub (1924–1996), author and translator
- Homayoun Sanaatizadeh (1925–2009), author, translator and entrepreneur
- Mohammad-Ali Eslami Nodooshan (1925–2022), poet and author
- Dr.Ali Javan (1926–2016) Alumni 1944, Physicist and 1st Gas Laser inventor in the world
- Bijan Jalali (1927–2009), poet
- Manuchehr Jamali (1928–2012), philosopher and poet
- Mohammad Qahraman (1929–2013), poet
- Mehdi Zarghamee, professor of computer science
- Firouz Partovi (born 1936), physicist
- Dariush Ashoori (born 1938), author and translator
- Iraj Kaboli (born 1938), author and translator
- Paris Moayedi (born 1938), entrepreneur
- Hossein Amanat (born 1942), architect
- Homayoun Katouzian (born 1942), historian and political scientist
- Saeed Sohrabpour (born 1943), professor of mechanical engineering
- Freydoon Shahidi (born 1947), mathematician
- Mehrdad Abedi (born 1948), professor of electrical engineering
- Jacob Lahijani (1951–2019), inventor of Kevlar 149 and ECCtreme ECA the first new fluoropolymer class in decades.
- Caro Lucas (1949–2010), scientist
- Abbas Edalat, professor of computer sciences
- Houchang E. Chehabi (born 1954), professor of international relations and history
- Cumrun Vafa (born 1960), string theorist
- Farzad Nazem (born 1960), former CTO of Yahoo!
- Houman Younessi (1963–2016), professor of computer science
- Kamyar Kalantar-Zadeh (born 1963), scientist and physician
- Kourosh Kalantar-zadeh (born 1971), scientist and inventor
- Ramin Golestanian, theoretical physicist
- Manoucher Parvin, Professor and novelist

=== Artists ===
Sources

- Homayoun Khorram (1930–2013), musician
- Jamshid Mashayekhi (1934–2019), actor
- Khosrow Sinai (born 1941), film director
- Siavash Ghomeishi (born 1945), musician, singer and song writer
- Amir Parvin Hosseini (born 1967), film producer
- Behzad Abdi (born 1973), musician

=== Athletes ===
- Abbas Ekrami (1915–2001), football manager

=== Media figures ===
- Adel Ferdosipour (born 1974), football commentator

== Area and Gallery ==
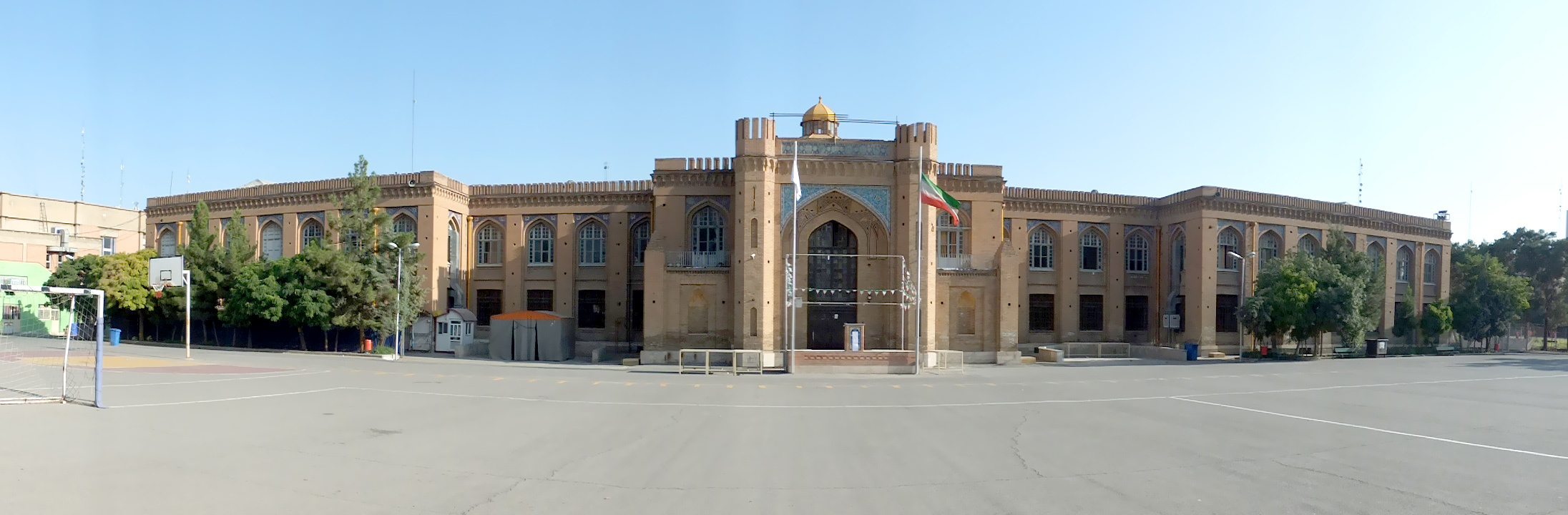
A picture of the back of the central building

== See also ==
- Dar ol-Fonoon
- Education in Iran
- Higher education in Iran
- Razi High School
- Christianity in Iran
