= Iravani =

Family name

Iravani (Persian: ایروانی; lit. "from Iravan", aka, Yerevan) is a common surname in Iran, Azerbaijan and to a much lesser extent in the rest of the Caucasus.

== People ==
- Amir-Saeid Iravani, Iranian diplomat
- Haji-Mollah Abbas Iravani, other name of Haji Mirza Aqasi, prime minister of Qajar Iran between 1835-1848
- Mehdi Vaez-Iravani, Iranian scientist
- Reza Iravani, Iranian-Canadian professor
- Fazil Iravani, Second Sheikh ul-Islam of the Caucasus
- Mirza Kadym Irevani, Azerbaijani ornamentalist artist and portraitist, founder of Azerbaijani panel painting

== See also ==
- Sardar Iravani, a title assumed by the last khan (governor) of the Erivan Khanate of Persia, which also became the eponymous namesake of the Qajar "Sardari Iravani" royal family branch.
