= Reza N. Jazar =

Reza Nakhaie Jazar also known as Reza N. Jazar is an Iranian professor of Mechanical engineering at RMIT University.

== Education ==
Reza received his master's degree from Tehran Polytechnic in 1990, specializing in robotics. He acquired his PhD from Sharif University of Technology in Nonlinear Dynamics and Applied Mathematics, in 1997.

== Career ==
Professor Jazar served as the Associate Dean and Head of the Mechanical and Automotive Engineering discipline at RMIT in Melbourne, Victoria 2010-2020.

He is the founder of the Journal of Nonlinear Engineering, and he has been its editor-in-chief for 2012-2018.

== Select book publications ==
- Jazar, Reza N. (2023). Advanced Vibrations: Theory and Application. New York: Springer. ISBN 978-3031163555.
- Jazar, Reza N. (2022). Theory of Applied Robotics: Kinematics, Dynamics and Control (3rd ed.). New York: Springer. ISBN 978-3-030-93219-0.
- Jazar, Reza N. (2022). Nonlinear Approaches in Engineering Applications: Design Engineering Problems. New York: Springer. ISBN 978-3-030-82718-2.
- Jazar, Reza N. (2021). Perturbation Methods in Science and Engineering. New York: Springer. ISBN 978-3-030-73462-6.
- Jazar, Reza N. (2020). Approximation Methods in Science and Engineering. New York: Springer. ISBN 978-1-07-160480-9.
- Jazar, Reza N. (2020). Nonlinear Approaches in Engineering Applications: Automotive Applications of Engineering Problems. New York: Springer. ISBN 978-3-030-18962-4.
- Jazar, Reza N. (2019). Advanced Vehicle Dynamics. Springer. ISBN 978-3-030-13060-2.
- Jazar, Reza N. (2018). Nonlinear Approaches in Engineering Applications: Energy, Vibrations, and Modern Applications. New York: Springer. ISBN 978-3-319-69480-1.
- Jazar, Reza N. (2017). Vehicle Dynamics: Theory and Application (3rd ed.). New York: Springer. ISBN 978-3-319-53441-1.
- Jazar, Reza N. (2016). Nonlinear Approaches in Engineering Applications: Applied Mechanics, Vibration Control, and Numerical Analysis. New York: Springer. ISBN 978-3-319-27055-5.
- Jazar, Reza N. (2015). Nonlinear Approaches in Engineering Applications: Applied Mechanics, Vibration Control, and Numerical Analysis. New York: Springer. ISBN 978-3-319-09461-8.
- Jazar, Reza N. (2014). Vehicle Dynamics: Theory and Application (2nd ed.). New York: Springer. ISBN 978-1-4614-8543-8.
- Jazar, Reza N. (2014). Wave Propagation in Solid and Porous Half-Space Media. New York: Springer. ISBN 978-1461492689.
- Jazar, Reza N. (2014). Nonlinear Approaches in Engineering Applications 2. New York: Springer. ISBN 978-1-4614-6876-9.
- Jazar, Reza N. (2013). Advanced Vibrations: A Modern Approach. Springer. ISBN 9781461441595.
- Jazar, Reza N. (2012). Nonlinear Approaches in Engineering Applications. New York: Springer. ISBN 978-1-4614-1468-1.
- Jazar, Reza N. (2011). Advanced Dynamics: Rigid Body, Multibody, and Aerospace Applications. Wiley. ISBN 978-0-4703-9835-7.
- Jazar, Reza N. (2010). Theory of Applied Robotics: Kinematics, Dynamics, and Control (2nd ed.). New York: Springer. ISBN 978-1-4419-1749-2.
- Jazar, Reza N. (2010). Vibrations of Thick Cylindrical Structures. New York: Springer. ISBN 978-0-387-75590-8.
- Jazar, Reza N. (2008). Vehicle Dynamics: Theory and Application. New York: Springer. ISBN 978-0-387-74243-4.
- Jazar, Reza N. (2007). Theory of Applied Robotics: Kinematics, Dynamics, and Control. New York: Springer. ISBN 978-0-387-68964-7.
