= Mohammad Reza Eslami =

Iranian mechanical engineer (born 1945)

- Born: 1945 (age 80–81); Tehran, Iran
- Known for: Thermoelasticity
- Scientific career
- Fields: Applied mechanics, solid mechanics
- Workplaces: Louisiana State University; NASA-LSU space shuttle team project through Manned Spacecraft Center in Houston; Tehran Polytechnic

Mohammad Reza Eslami (born 1945) is an Iranian scientist and professor of Mechanical Engineering at Tehran Polytechnic (Amirkabir University of Technology), Tehran, Iran.

== Education ==
- Ph.D. – Louisiana State University, Baton Rouge La., US, 1973
- M.Sc. – Louisiana State University, Baton Rouge La., US, 1970
- B.Sc. – Amirkabir University of Technology (Tehran Polytechnic), Tehran, Iran 1968

== Recognition and awards ==
- ASME Fellow, 2001.
- AIAA Associate Fellow, 1996.
- Fellow Iran Academy of Science, head of mechanical engineering branch (1992–95), Chairman of Engineering section (2003-2005, 2019,....)
- National Secretary of the ISME Honor members committee.
- Distinguished Professor; Amirkabir University of Technology 1991, and 1997, 2002
- ASME 1994 Award Plaque, American Society of Mech. Eng.(ASME), ASME-ESDA Conf. London, July 1994
- ISME 1996 Plaque recipient, National distinguished Professor
- ASME 1996 Award plaque ASME-ESDA conf. Montpellier, France, July 1996
- 1998 ESDA Award PLaque, Society for Design and Process Science, Third World Conference on Integrated Design and Process Tech.,1998, Berlin, Germany.
- ASME Award PLaque, American Society of MechanicalEngineers, Petroleum Div., ESDA 2000 Conference, Montreux, Switzerland, July 10–13, 2000.
- ASME Petroleum Div. Medal, American Society of Mechanical Engineers, Petroleum Div., ESDA 2000 Conference, Montreux, Switzerland, July 10–13, 2000.
- Nationally distinguished researcher, Ministry of Higher Education, Iran, 2002.
- Nationally distinguished Professor, Ministry of Higher Education, Iran, 2003.

== Books ==
- Editor: " Design: Analysis, Synthesis, and Application, Vol. C " Pub. ASME, New York, 1994
- Co-Editor: " Design: Analysis, Synthesis, and Application, Vol. A" Pub. ASME, New York, 1994
- Co-Editor: " Design: Analysis, Synthesis, and Application, Vol. B" Pub. ASME, New York, 1994
- Editor: " Computational and Thermomechanic, Proc. ASME-ESDA conf. ASME, New York, 1996
- Co-Editor: " General Design Analysis, Considerations and Applications — Education., Vol. 6, SDPS, Texas, 1998.
- Hetnarski, R.B, and Eslami, M.R., Thermal Stresses, Advanced Theory and Applications, Springer, Netherlands, 2009.
- Hetnarski, R.B, and Eslami, M.R., Thermal Stresses, Advanced Theory and Applications, Second Edition, Springer, Switzerland, 2019.
- Eslami, M.R., Hetnarski, R.B., Ignaczak, J., Noda, N., Sumi, N., Tanigawa, Y., {\bf Theory of Elasticity and Thermal Stresses, Problems and Solutions}, Springer, The Netherlands, 2013.
- Author: A First Course in Finite Element Analysis, (in English), Amirkabir University Press, 2003
- Author: " Finite Elements Methods in Mechanics", Springer, Switzerland, 2014.
- Author: " Buckling and Postbuckling of Beams, Plates, and Shells", Springer, Switzerland, 2018.
- Book Section - Thermal Stresses in Thick FGM Pressure Vessels, Appeared in "Pressure Vessels and Piping : Codes, Standards, Design and Analysis", Edited by Baldev Raj, B.K. Choudhary, and Velusamy, Narosa Publishing House, 2007, India.
