= Haghi =

Haghi is a surname. Notable people with the surname include:

- Alireza Haghi (born 1979), Iranian cyclist
- Aylar Haghi (1999–2022), Iranian student killed while protesting
- Davoud Haghi (born 1981), Iranian footballer
