= Kalim Kashani =

17th century Persian poet

Kalim Kashani (1581/1585–1651) (Persian: کلیم کاشانی) was one of the leading Persian poets of the 17th century.

== Life ==
He was born in Hamadan, but soon moved to Kashan, and this is the reason for his pen-name/association (nisba) Kashani. He studied at Kashan and Shiraz, before going to the Deccan in India. He then became friends with Shahnavaz Khan of Shiraz (d. 1611), a court official to Ibrahim Adil Shah II, the ruler of Bijapur. His first journey to India did not bring him the success he desired, and he was imprisoned for a while due to charges of being a spy. In 1619 he returned to Iran, placing high hopes of Iranian patrons. However, he became nostalgic for India (which he was genuinely fond of) and returned in 1621. Until 1628 he was at Agra in the service of Mir Jomla of Shahrestan, who himself was a poet with the pen name of Ruh al-Amin). He addresses Ruh al-Amin in several panegyrics. In 1628, due to some eulogies of Abu'l-Hasan Asaf Khan, he became a member of the court of the Mogul emperor Shah Jahan (r. 1628–58). He impressed Emperor Shah Jahan so much that the emperor bestowed the title of poet laureate (Persian: Malek al-šoʿarā, lit. "King of Poets") on him in 1632.

== Works ==
His works amount to 24,000 lines, about 15,000 couplets in his version of the Shah-nama and 9,500 couplets in his Divan. His Divan which has recently been edited and published by the scholar Mohammad Qahraman contains 36 qaṣidas (odes), 2 tarkib-bands (stanzaic or strophic poem), 1 tarjiʿ-band (a poem with a refrain), 32 qeṭʿas (occasional poem), 33 tāriḵs (chronograms), 28 short maṯnawis (rhyming couplets), 590 Ghazals (lyrics), and 102 robāʿis (quatrains), making a total of 9,823 couplets.

== See also ==
- List of Persian poets and authors
- Persian literature
