= Sulayman Hayyim =

Iranian lexicographer (1887–1970)

Soleiman Hayyim
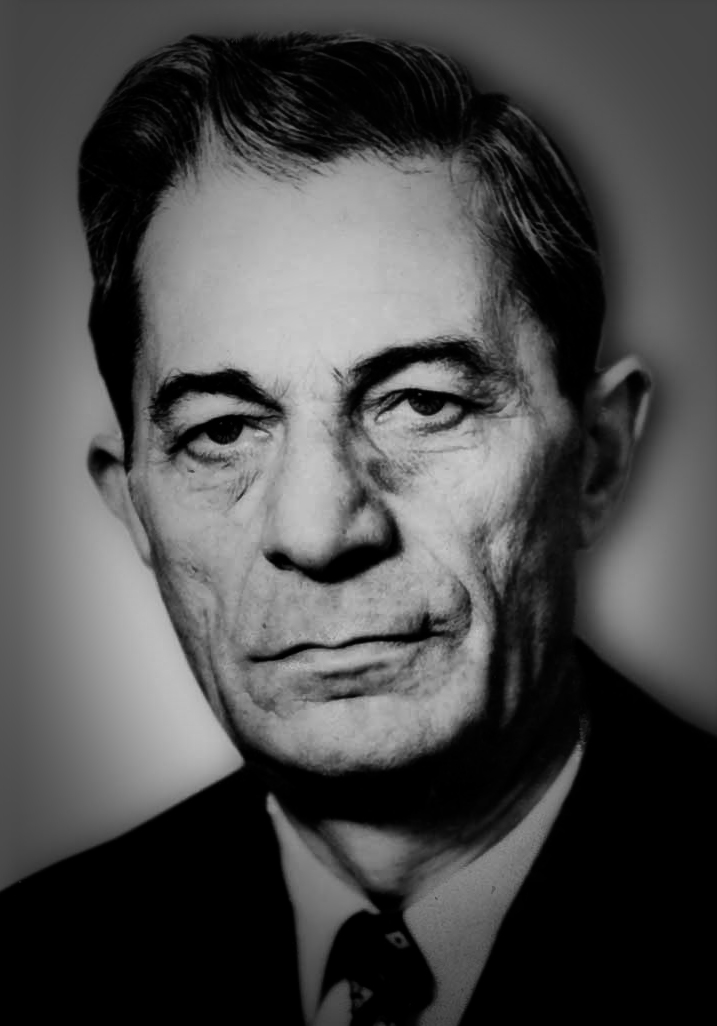
- Hayyim, author of Persian, English, French, and Hebrew dictionaries
- Born: c. 1887 Tehran, Sublime State of Iran
- Died: 14 February 1970 (aged 82–83) Tehran, Imperial State of Iran
- Occupation: Lexicographer, translator, essayist, poet
- Spouse: Azizagha Bakhshitarzan

Soleiman Hayyim (Persian: سلیمان حییم; c. 1887 – 14 February 1970), was an Iranian lexicographer, translator, playwright and essayist, often called "Iran's Father of the bilingual dictionary".

== Biography ==
Hayyim was born into an Iranian Jewish family. His father, Hayyim Eshāq, was a quilter. Both of his parents were Kalimis (Iranian Jews) of Shirazi origin who had migrated to Tehran. Hayyim began his education in a "Maktabkhaneh" (traditional type of elementary school) called Noor, which belonged to Christian missionaries in Tehran. He learned the Hebrew language and religious matters from the well-known Hakham Hayyim Moreh and became his pupil and assistant when Moreh became blind.

He continued his studies in Ettehad secondary school, where he learned French and Hebrew. He was 19 when he entered the American High School (later renamed American College, and yet later Alborz High School), which was run by a group of American missionaries under the supervision of the legendary Samuel M. Jordan. At the college, young Sulayman excelled in English, Persian literature, and music.

== Career ==
Sulayman Hayyim started teaching English in 1915 at the American College. Soon after, he began working on the first series of bilingual dictionaries printed in Persian, a task that earned him the honorary name "Word Master". Later, he switched to translation. He is known to have worked for the Iranian Ministry of Finance for several years as a translator to Dr. Arthur Millspaugh, an American adviser to the Iranian government on fiscal matters.

He then moved on to the Anglo-Iranian Oil Company, where he headed the translation bureau until his retirement in the 1950s. His first published work (1928) is a play, Yusof va Zoleikha, based on the story of Joseph and Potiphar’s wife Zuleikha, from the Old Testament. Haim wrote this play to be performed by the students of Alliance School. His first reference work, the New English–Persian Dictionary, in two volumes, was published in 1929–31. This was later replaced by the Larger English–Persian Dictionary, and never reprinted.

He knew French, Hebrew, English, and Persian, and produced bilingual dictionaries in French and Hebrew as well as English. He also wrote a compilation of Persian proverbs and their English equivalents with the name "A Book of Collected Poems". Besides Yusof va Zoleikha, he wrote the plays "Esther and Mordecai" and "Ruth and Naomi". Besides writing these plays and composing their music, Haim also directed and performed in them. Moreover, he translated and contributed to articles in the Persian Encyclopedia that dealt with matters relating to the Jewish faith.

== Works/Publications ==
=== Hayyim's English–Persian and Persian–English dictionaries ===
Below is a list of Hayyim’s English–Persian and Persian–English dictionaries:

- Larger English–Persian Dictionary, first published 1933, revised 1945, reissued in one volume and two volumes subsequently, rejuvenated and freshly typeset 1997. (It is his largest work, with 55,000 entries and 25,000 phrases.) ISBN 978-0-939-21448-8
- One-Volume Persian–English Dictionary, first published in 1952 and reprinted many times subsequently, freshly typeset and reformatted in 1995.
- One-Volume English–Persian Dictionary, first published in 1954 and reprinted many times subsequently. ISBN 978-0-939-21449-5
- Shorter English–Persian Dictionary, first published 1956, revised 1962, reprinted several times subsequently, revised again 1994 ISBN 978-0-939-21450-1
- Shorter Persian–English Dictionary, first published in 1957 and reprinted several times subsequently, freshly typeset and reformatted in 1996.

=== Works as Translator ===
- Analyzing the Symbols and Myths of the Novel, Tarigh Besmel Shodan, by Mahmoud Dovlatabadi

== Death ==
Soleyman Haim died in 1970 at the age of 82, with many projects left incomplete. Dariush Haim, Davood Adhami, Jahanguir Banayan, and Manouchehr Amiri have each written about their memories of Hayyim.

Hayyim was fond of Persian history and literature, and the divans of Sa'di and Hafez were his favourite books. He was also an amateur poet.

== See also ==
- List of Persian-language poets and authors

== Sources ==
=== Books and periodicals ===
- Asef, Bijan, "Ostād Soleiman Haïm", Ofoq-e Binā, Vol II, No X, Tir-Shahrivar 1379 AHS (Summer 2000); and No XI, Mehr-Day 1379 AHS (Autumn 2000).
- Browne, E. G. Literary History of Persia, four volumes, 1998. ISBN 0-7007-0406-X
- Emami, Karim, Az past o boland-e tarjome, Vol 1, Tehran; Vol 2 (1385 AHS, 2006).
- Haïm, Dariush, "Pedaram, Soleiman Haïm", in: Sarshar, Homa, and Hooman Sarshar, Yahudiān-e Irani dar tārikh-e mo'āser (Iranian Jews in contemporary history), Vol III, CA (Winter 1999).
- Rypka, Jan, et al. History of Iranian Literature (D. Reidel, 1968). ASIN B-000-6BXVT-K

=== Websites ===
- www.cijoh.org
