= KUF (disambiguation) =

Kuf or KUF may refer to:

== Language ==
- Kuf, a letter of the modern Hebrew alphabet
- Katu language, spoken in Southeast Asia (ISO 639: kuf)

== Other uses ==
- Kurumoch International Airport, Samara, Russia (IATA code: KUF)
- Kurdish United Front, a political group of Iranian Kurds
- Jan Kuf, Czech pentathlete
