= Mohammad Ali Mojtahedi =

Iranian academic (1908–1997)

- محمد علی مجتهدی
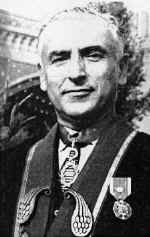
- Born: 23 September 1908; Lahijan, Sublime State of Iran
- Died: 1 July 1997 (aged 88); Nice, France
- Education: University of Lille; University of Paris
- Known for: Mathematics; Mechanical engineering
- Spouse: Suzanne Van Den Ostende
- Scientific career
- Fields: Professor
- Workplaces: Alborz High School; Sharif University of Technology

Dr. Mohammad Ali Modjtahedi Gilani (Persian: محمدعلی مجتهدی گیلانی; 23 September 1908 – 1 July 1997) was an Iranian University professor and lifetime principal of the highly prestigious Alborz High School in Tehran, Iran.

Founder of Sharif University of Technology (originally Aryamehr Technical University) and dean of Tehran Polytechnic University (currently renamed to Amirkabir University of Technology). Memoirs of Mohammad-Ali Modjtahedi (Persian) 2000 were published as part of Harvard University's Iranian Oral History Project.

== Life ==
He was born in Lahijan, Gilan province, northern Iran. At seven years old, he started elementary school at Haqiqat school, after which he moved to Tehran to continue his education at the Dār-ol-Mo'allemin-e Markazi in 1925. He finished high school at Madrese-ye Motavassete in eastern Tehran and received his high school diploma in 1931. In 1932, among 100 other prominent students, he was sent to France for higher education. He completed his undergraduate studies at the Université Lille Nord de France in 1935 and his doctorate at the Paris-Sorbonne University in Mechanical Engineering in 1938.

== Bibliography ==
- Habib Ladjevardi, Memoirs of Mohammad-Ali Modjtahedi [Persian Language], (ِIbex Publishers). ISBN 978-0-932885-25-8.

Academic offices
Preceded by Lotfali Sooratgar	Principal of Alborz High School; 1944-1979	Succeeded by Hossein Khoshnevisan
Preceded by None	Chancellor of Aryamehr Technical University; 1965–1968	Succeeded by Fazlollah Reza
Preceded by Habib Nafisi	Chancellor of Tehran Polytechnic ?	Succeeded by Kayvan Najmabadi
