= Reliability Engineering and Risk Analysis =

Textbook on techniques for analysis of reliability and risk

Reliability Engineering and Risk Analysis: A Practical Guide
- Author: Mohammad Modarres, Mark Kaminskiy, Vasiliy Krivtsov
- ISBN: 9781498745871

Reliability Engineering and Risk Analysis: A Practical Guide (ISBN 9781498745871) is a textbook on techniques for analysis of reliability and risk, written by Mohammad Modarres, Mark Kaminskiy, and Vasiliy Krivtsov. The book is held in the collection of the University of Sunderland Library.
