= Mehdi Vaez-Iravani =

Iranian electrical engineer

Mehdi Vaez-Iravani is an Iranian scientist, engineer and inventor involved in the invention of "Shear-force microscopy".

Mehdi Vaez-Iravani graduated with a PhD in Electrical engineering from University College London and became a faculty member at Rochester Institute of Technology before joining KLA Tencor.

He has numerous patents and scientific publications in optics, optical engineering and related areas. He attended Alborz High School in Tehran, Iran from 1971 to 1975.

== Selected bibliography ==
- Vaez-Iravani, Mehdi, ed. (30 March 1995). Scanning Probe Microscopies III (Proceedings Volume). Scanning Probe Microscopies III. Vol. 2384. Bellingham, WA, USA: International Society for Optics and Photonics (SPIE). ISBN 978-0-8194-1731-2. OCLC 57388570.
- Vaez-Iravani, Mehdi; Toledo-Crow, Ricardo; Ade, Harald; et al. (30 March 1995). Near-field microscopy of thin films: application to polymeric structures. Scanning Probe Microscopies III. Proceedings. Vol. 2384. Bellingham, WA, USA: International Society for Optics and Photonics (SPIE). p. 166. doi:10.1117/12.205926. ISSN 0361-0748. OCLC 201621977.
- Toledo-Crow, Ricardo; Smith, Bruce W.; Rogers, Jon K.; Vaez-Iravani, Mehdi (1 May 1994). Bennett, Marylyn H (ed.). Near-field optical microscopy characterization of IC metrology (Proceedings Paper). Integrated Circuit Metrology, Inspection, and Process Control VIII. Proceedings. Vol. 2196. Bellingham, WA, USA: International Society for Optics and Photonics (SPIE). p. 62. doi:10.1117/12.174165. ISSN 0361-0748. OCLC 703607580.
- Toledo-Crow, Ricardo; Vaez-Iravani, Mehdi; Smith, Bruce W.; Summa, Joseph R. (4 August 1993). Postek, Michael T. (ed.). Characterization of atomic force microscopy and electrical probing techniques for IC metrology. Integrated Circuit Metrology, Inspection, and Process Control VII. Proceedings. Vol. 1926. Bellingham, WA, USA: International Society for Optics and Photonics (SPIE). pp. 357–368. doi:10.1117/12.148946. ISSN 0361-0748. OCLC 563909391.
- Vaez-Iravani, Mehdi; Nonnenmacher, M.; Wickramasinghe, H. Kumar (1 August 1993). "Detection of high- and low-frequency vibrations using a feedback-stabilized differential fiber optic interferometer". Optical Engineering. 32 (8). Bellingham, WA, USA: International Society for Optics and Photonics (SPIE): 1879–1882. doi:10.1117/12.143338. ISSN 0091-3286. OCLC 196617649.
