= Mohammad Soleimani =

Iranian politician

- محمد سلیمانی
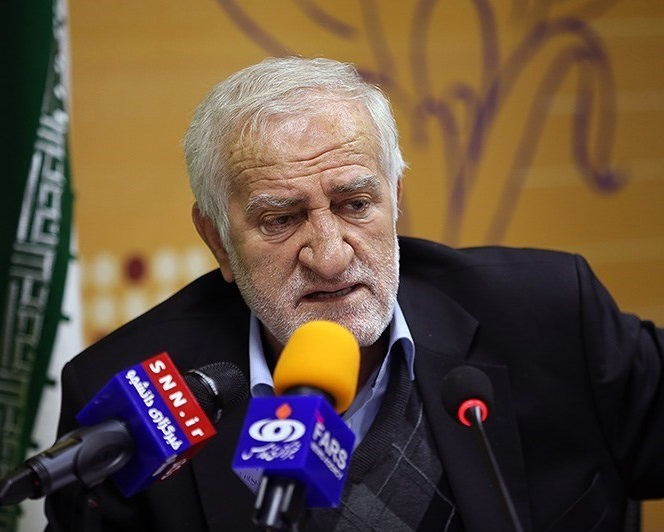

Member of the Parliament of Iran
- In office 3 May 2012 – 28 May 2016
- Constituency: Tehran, Rey, Shemiranat and Eslamshahr
- Majority: 284,452

Minister of Information and Communications Technology
- In office 24 August 2005 – 3 September 2009
- President: Mahmoud Ahmadinejad
- Preceded by: Ahmad Motamedi
- Succeeded by: Reza Taghipour

Personal details
- Born: 1954 (age 71–72) Kazerun, Pahlavi Iran
- Party: Front of Islamic Revolution Stability
- Other political affiliations: Islamic Republic Party
- Education: École supérieure d'électricité Pierre and Marie Curie University; Shiraz University

Mohammad Soleimani (born 1954) is an Iranian politician and former Minister of Communication and Information Technology (2005–2009). He is also an electrical engineer and a professor at Iran University of Science and Technology. He was born in Kazerun.

== Education ==
Soleimani was born in Kazerun. He received a BSc in 1978 from Shiraz University in Iran and a MSc in 1981 and a PhD in 1983 in high-frequency electronics from Pierre-and-Marie-Curie University.

== Signing of the Asia and Pacific Cooperation Organization Convention ==
Soleimani met with China's Deputy Prime Minister Huang Ju on 27 October 2005, and signed the convention establishing the Asia and Pacific Space Cooperation Organization (APSCO). Iran's first satellite Sinah-1 was launched with help from the Government of Russia from Polstesk space base in Murmansk province in northwestern Russia. Ahmad Talebzadeh, Iran's Aerospace Organization head, also attended the meeting.

When he returned to Tehran he told reporters, "By placing Iran's Sina-1 (Z-S.4) in its designated orbit, we have practically joined the group of countries enjoying space technology. It was a big achievement."

== World Summit on the Information Society ==
The 2005 World Summit on the Information Society was held in Tunisia from 16 to 19 November 2005. 12,000 officials from 50 different national governments, the United Nations, and various non-governmental organizations participated. Per Soleimani's wishes, "non-discriminatory access" to information technology was approved.
