= Aylar Haghi =

Azerbaijani Iranian student (1999–2022)

- آیلار حقی
- Born: 1999; Malekan, Malekan County, East Azerbaijan province, Iran
- Died: 16 November 2022 (aged 22–23); Tabriz, Iran
- Burial place: Vadi-e Rahmat
- Education: Tabriz Azad University

Aylar Haghi (1999 – 16 November 2022) was an Iranian student killed by Iranian security forces during the Mahsa Amini protests in Tabriz, Iran.

Government officials and the media have denied her killing, claiming that she fell from a height. Initially, they pressured her family to say that Aylar had committed suicide. When the family refused to accept this, her father was detained by the security forces. As a form of pressure, they didn't release her body to the family for two days and did not permit her burial in her hometown, Malekand.

The burial and the 40-day memorial ceremony for Aylar Haghi took place at the Vadi-e Rahmat cemetery with the participation of citizens. Participants voiced slogans against the government, such as "We are all Aylar, the struggle continues", "Freedom, justice, national government" and "Azerbaijan doesn't sleep, Aylar's blood does not go in vain". Both ceremonies were disrupted by the intervention of security forces. People were beaten and arrested during these incidents.

After Aylar Haghi's killing, protests intensified in the East Azerbaijan province. Protests and actions took place in the cities of Tabriz, Bonab, Malekan and Ardabil, and at Tabriz Azad University where Aylar studied. Several protestors were arrested during these demonstrations.

On 28 November 2022, young girls in the Republic of Azerbaijan organized a flash mob in memory of the people fighting for women's rights in Iran and in memory of Azerbaijani girls killed there, including Hadis Najafi, Asra Panahi, and Aylar Haghi.

== Biography ==
Aylar Haghi was born in 1999 in the city of Malekan to an Azerbaijani family. She and her family later moved to the city of Tabriz. She was a fourth-year student at the medical faculty of Tabriz Azad University at the time of her death.

== Killing ==
Haghi participated in the anti-government protest that took place in Tabriz on 16 November 2022, as part of the Mahsa Amini protests. Government forces began to disperse the demonstrations by using violence. After the intervention of the police, Haghi took refuge in a building to escape the violence. Several officers who were chasing her followed her into the building and shot her in the back of the head, killing her. Her body was then thrown from a high-rise building.

Security agents later pressured Haghi's family to say that she had intentionally fallen from the building in an act of suicide. The government had made similar claims following the deaths of other protesters. After her family refused to accept the suicide story, her father, Rajab Haghi, was detained by the security forces. To put pressure on Haghi's family, government forces kept her body for two days.

Iranian state-affiliated media published a video recorded by a security camera of a building and claimed that Aylar Haghi fell into a pit and lost her life shortly after getting out of the car. However, in this video, only one woman is seen getting out of the car. And it is impossible to identify the woman whose face is not even visible in the video.

== Burial ==
Haghi's family wanted to bury her in Malekan, where she was born, but they were not allowed to do so. Haghi's father, Rajab Haghi, was pressured to hold the funeral ceremony in Tabriz quietly and not publicise it. Nevertheless, the news became public and a large number of citizens attended the funeral. The funeral took place on 18 November 2022, at the Vadi-e Rahmat cemetery of Tabriz. Citizens participating in the funeral chanted slogans against Iran, such as "We are all Aylars, the struggle continues", "Freedom, justice, the national government" The security forces attacked the citizens gathered in the cemetery and killed them, removed them from the area and arrested several people. In addition, Professor Shamsi Abbasalizadeh of Tabriz University of Medical Sciences was suspended for attending Haghi's funeral.

On 27 December 2022, the 40-day memorial ceremony for Aylar Haghi took place. Participants at the ceremony chanted anti-government slogans such as "We are all Aylar, we demand freedom," "Azerbaijan doesn’t sleep", Aylar's blood does not go in vain," "Khamenei is a murderer, the government is untrustworthy," and "Death to the dictator". Haghi's father also made a speech during the ceremony. Subsequently, security forces intervened in the ceremony, resulting in a confrontation between the participants and the security forces in which security forces beat attendees with batons. Haghi's parents and several others were arrested.

== Legacy ==
Aylar Haghi's killing escalated protests in East Azerbaijan province. Strong protests and demonstrations took place in Tabriz, Bonab, and Malekan, where Haghi was born. Several protestors were arrested during these protests. Medical students from Tabriz Azad University also organised demonstrations following Haghi's killing.

On 28 November 2022, young girls in Azerbaijan organized a flash mob in memory of those fighting for women's rights in Iran and the Azerbaijani girls killed there, including Hadis Najafi, Asra Panahi, and Aylar Haghi. At the end of the flash mob, images of Haghi and other slain Azerbaijanis were displayed, accompanied by the message "We know, we are with you!".

On 20 February 2023, slogans like "Aylar Haghi," "You can erase our slogans from walls, not the traces of blood," "Death to Khamenei," and "Death to the dictator" were written on walls in the streets of Tabriz.

== See also ==
- Death of Hadis Najafi
- Death of Asra Panahi
- Mahsa Amini protests
