= Vadi-e Rahmat =

Cemetery in Tabriz, Iran

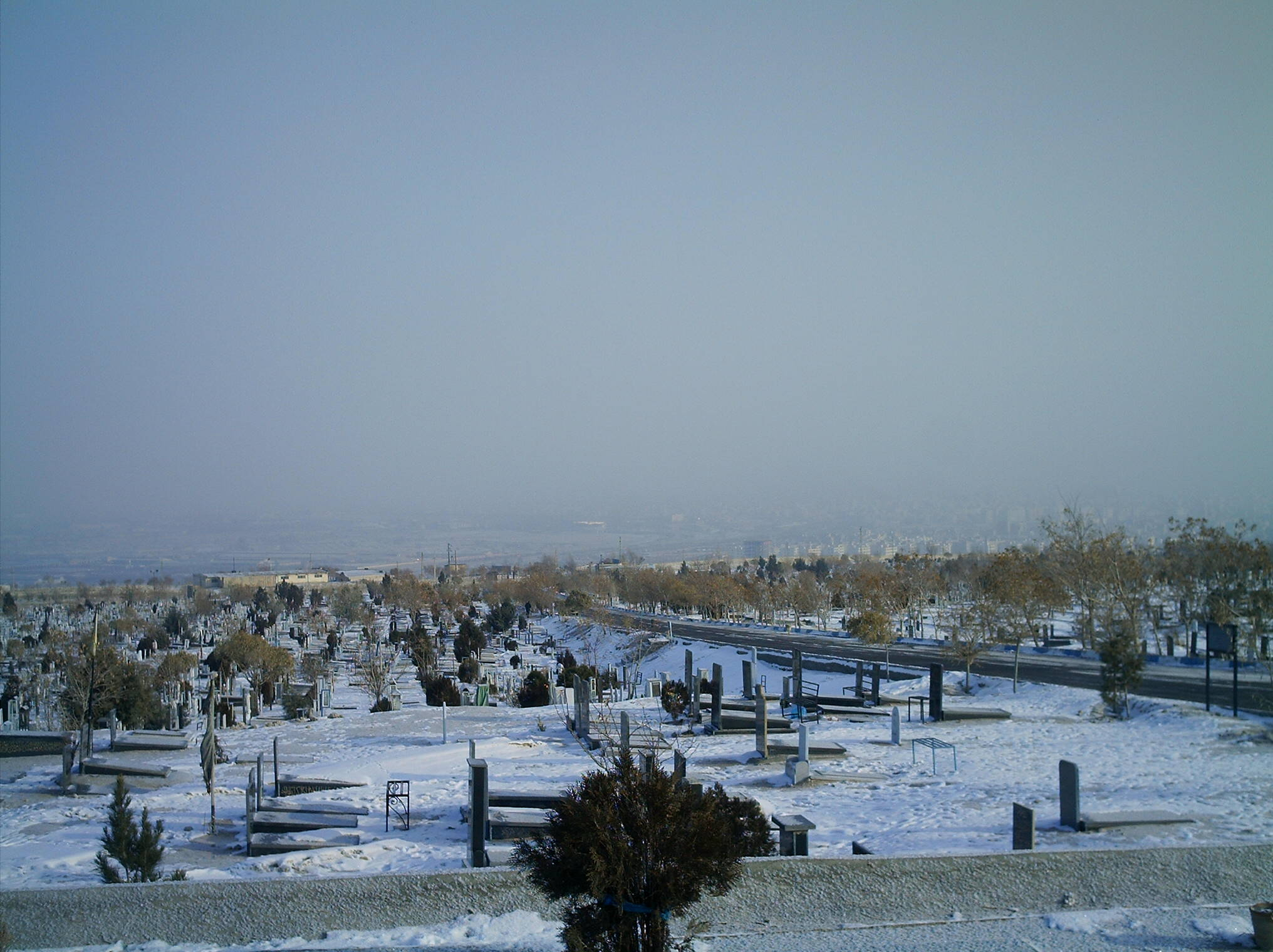
Vadi-e Rahmat in winter

Vadi-e Rahmat (Benefaction Valley) is the main cemetery of Tabriz, East Azerbaijan, Iran. Located in the southeastern part of the city, it is served by a road line which connects it to the southern highway of Tabriz. Many Iranian soldiers from Tabriz who died in the Iran–Iraq War are buried there.

== Notable burials ==
- Abolhassan Eqbali Azar (fa) (1863–1971) – singer
- Kazem Saadati (fa) (1940–1971) – Marxist activist
- Abdolali Karang (fa) (1923–1979) – writer
- Jafar Khamenei (ru) (1887–1983) – political activist
- Morteza Yaghchian (fa) (1956–1983) – member of IRGC
- Salamullah Javid (1900–1986) – politician
- Mahmoud Farnam (fa) (1871–1993) – musician
- Ali Bakhshayesh (fa) (1916–1998) – singer
- Abdollah Vaez (fa) (1926–2000) – scholar
- Mohammad-Ali Erteghaei (fa) (d. 2002) – calligrapher
- Ebrahim Bakht-Sholouhi (fa) (1941–2006) – calligrapher
- Samad Sardarinia (fa) (1947–2008) – scholar
- Jamal Torabi (fa) (1925–2009) – numismatist
- Asghar Roufegar (fa) (1923–2010) – artist
- Manouchehr Mortazavi (fa) (1929–2010) – scholar
- Mohsen Koochebaghi Tabrizi (1924–2011) – cleric
- Saleh Hosseini (fa) (1945–2011) – poet
- Aalaeddin Melmasi (cz) (1952–2011) – photographer
- Bahman Sarkarati (fa) (1937–2013) – linguist
- Mohammad Jarrahi (fa) (d. 2014) – union activist
- Mohammad-Hossein Mobin (fa) (1927–2015) – writer
- Shahrokh Zamani (1964–2015) – union activist
- Imran Heidari (fa) (1956–2018) – singer
- Behrouz Rahbar (1945–2019) – cyclist
- Aylar Haghi (1999–2022) – protester
- Ali Tabrizli - poet, writer, publisher.
