= Iraj Kaboli =

Iranian writer (1938–2021)

Iraj Kaboli ایرج کابلی
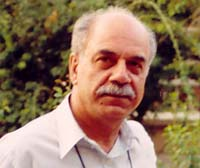
- Born: 12 April 1938; Kerman, Iran
- Died: 17 February 2021 (aged 82)
- Occupations: Persian writer and translator

Iraj Kaboli (Persian: ایرج کابلی; 12 April 1938 – 17 February 2021) was an Iranian writer, linguist and translator.

== Biography ==
Iraj was born in 1938 in a Zoroastrian family in Kerman. He came to Tehran for his high school and pursued his education there at Alborz High School.

His passion for languages led him to learn several languages and he started to translate from English and Russian. He was also a friend and associate of Ahmad Shamloo, a member of the Iranian Writers' Association, and a member of the Council for Revising the Orthography of the Persian Language.

He was a member of the Board of Trustees of Hooshang Golshiri Foundation.
