= Amir Timur Portrab =

Iranian Musician (1929–2023)

Amir Timur Portrab امیرتیمور پورتراب
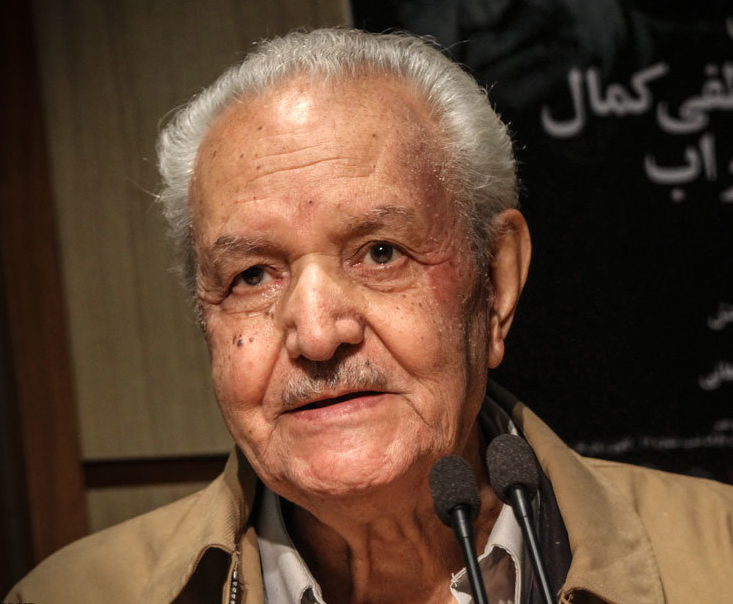
- Amir Timur Portrab at the commemoration ceremony of Mustafa Kamal Portrab, January 11, 2014, Afshar Foundation Persian Language Center

Background information
- Born: September 6, 1929 (age 97); Tehran, Iran
- Died: 24 July 2023 (aged 93) Paris, France
- Genre: Classical Persian music
- Occupations: Musician, teacher
- Instruments: Tar, Viola, Violin, Oboe, Piano, Ghaychak,

Amir Timur Portrab (Persian: امیرتیمور پورتراب, September 6, 1929 – July 24, 2023) was an Iranian musician and music teacher.

== Career ==
Amir Timur Portrab began his musical career as a child, under the tutelage of his older brother Mustafa Kamal Portrab. He entered the Music Conservatory in the sixth grade and began playing the tar with Ali Naghi Vaziri. He began playing the oboe with the Czechoslovak musician Jaro Slawbandelczyk. He then chose the violin and took classes with Serge Khotsev, Luigi Pazanari, and Heshmat Sanjari, and began working as a viola player with the Music Conservatory Orchestra. He was employed by the Ministry of Culture and Arts in 1956 and worked as a viola player in the Tehran Symphony Orchestra, continuing his work until his retirement in 1977.

Portrab played for a time in the ballet and opera orchestras and taught violin at the National Music Conservatory. He taught music theory and solfege at the Higher Music Conservatory. He founded the alto group of the Conservatory of Music Chamber Orchestra and taught viola, violin, and piano for many years.

=== Artistic activities ===
Amir Timur Portrab's artistic activities include:

Playing in the Tehran Symphony Orchestra, playing in the Opera Orchestra, playing in radio orchestras such as the Flower Orchestra, teaching at the Music Conservatory, teaching at the School of Arts and Literature of the Iranian Broadcasting Corporation, and conducting the orchestra of the School of Arts and Literature of the Iranian Broadcasting Corporation.
