= Alireza Rahai =

Iranian engineer

Alireza Rahai (Persian: علیرضا رهایی, born 1954 in Kazeroon, Iran) is an Iranian engineer, academic, scholar and professor at the Department of Civil and Environmental Engineering of Amirkabir University of Technology. He is also a member of the Iranian Science and Culture Hall of Fame and Vice President for Academic and Post Graduate Affairs of Islamic Azad University. He has been the Chancellor of the Amirkabir University of Technology in three terms: from 1996 to 1997, from 2005 to 2014 and from 2023 until now.
