= Bahaedin Adab =

Iranian politician, engineer

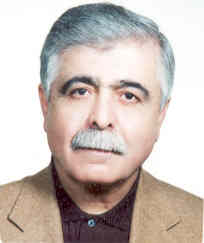
Bahaedin Adab

Bahaedin Adab (Persian: بهاءالدين ادب), also spelled Bahaeddin or Bahaoddin Adab, Kurdish "Baha Adab" (21 August 1945 – 16 August 2007) was an Iranian Kurdish politician, engineer and philanthropist. A reformist, he served as an independent deputy in the Islamic Consultative Assembly for two terms from 1996 to 2004. He co-founded the Karafarin Bank in 2001 and the Kurdish United Front in 2005.

== Biography ==
Adab was born in Sanandaj, Kurdistan province, as a son of Baqer, a landowner. He received his master's degree in civil engineering from Amirkabir University of Technology (Tehran Polytechnique).

He was elected to the Majlis of Iran as an independent in the 1996 and 2000 Iranian legislative elections, representing the constituency of Sanandaj, Divandarreh and Kamyaran (comprising Sanandaj, Kamyaran and Dîwandere) during the fifth and sixth terms of this assembly. In 2001, he became one of the founders of Karafarin Bank, the first private bank to be established since the Iranian Revolution.

He was disqualified by the Guardian Council from participation in the 2004 Iranian legislative election among some 2,500 other independent or reformist candidates. He was accused of not practising Islam, contradicting the Guardianship of the Islamic Jurist, having worked for the Pahlavi regime as a member of SAVAK, and of belonging to an illegal political party and to Freemasonry. He rejected the latter charges, affirmed his Islamic faith, and stated that the true reasons had to do with his defence of the rights of the people and his independent-mindedness.

In December 2005, he joined Saleh Nikbakht, Abdollah Sohrabi, Bayezid Mardokhi and Hussain Shah Waysi in founding the Kurdish United Front, a reformist coalition of activists and NGOs based in Sanandaj, and served as its first spokesperson. In an interview for the Deutsche Welle, he said that the group aimed to work for democracy, justice and equality, and to enable Kurdish participation in the "pyramid of power".

Adab served as chairman of the Syndicate of Iranian Construction Contractors, CEO of Abej Construction Company, CEO of Ravagh Construction Company, deputy chairman of the Confederation of Iranian Industries, member of the board of directors of the Iran Chamber of Commerce, Industries, Mines & Agriculture, deputy chairman of Karafarin Bank, board member of Karafarin Insurance, chairman of the Association of Engineering and Building Controllers, chairman of Namavaran Mohandessi Investment Company, member of the board of trustees of Amirkabir University of Technology (Polytechnique), and deputy chairman of the Iranian Basketball Federation.

His last position was as a spokesman of the International Organisation of Employers-affiliated Iranian Confederation of Employers' Associations (ICEA), founded by Mohammad Otaredian in 1996, which the government attempted to dissolve and substitute in late 2006. In an interview for the US-funded Radio Farda in May 2006, he denounced the portrayal of capitalists as "bloodsuckers and parasites" in the Islamic Republic of Iran and appealed to the state to improve legal protection for investors and businesses in the country.

He died of stomach cancer on 16 August 2007 in Tehran. He was buried in "Bahasht Mhamadi" Behesht-e Mohammadi cemetery in Sanandaj alongside his parents.
