= Abolhassan Astaneh-Asl =

Iranian-American engineer (born 1947)

Abolhassan Astaneh-Asl ابوالحسن آستانه‌اصل
- Born: 1948 (age 77–78); Tabriz, Iran
- Education: Amirkabir University of Technology; University of Michigan
- Awards: Higgins Lectureship Award presented by the American Institute of Steel Construction
- Scientific career
- Fields: Academic
- Workplaces: University of California, Berkeley
- Doctoral advisors: Professors Subhash Goel and Robert D. Hanson

Abolhassan Astaneh-Asl (Persian: ابوالحسن آستانه‌اصل; born 1947 in Tabriz) is an Iranian-American academic, structural engineer and professor at University of California, Berkeley. He was one of the leading structural engineers to investigate the collapse of the World Trade Center towers on the September 11 attacks.
