= Death of Asra Panahi =

Iranian girl killed during the Mahsa Amini protests in 2022

Asra Panahi
- Native name: اسراء پناهی
- Date: 12 October 2022 (age 15)
- Location: Ardabil, Ardabil province, Iran
- Deaths: Asra Panahi
- Burial: Ali-Abad Cemetery, Ardabil

On 12 October 2022, Iranian teenager Asra Panahi (Persian: اسراء پناهی, born on 5 March 2007) was killed during the Mahsa Amini protests in the city of Ardabil. She was among a group of students at Shahed Girls High School who are reported to have refused to join a pro-government demonstration and perform the "Salam Farmandeh" song. The students are reported to have been beaten by plainclothes security forces summoned to the school. Panahi died at Fatemi Hospital in Ardabil after sustaining severe injuries.

== Life ==
Asra Panahi was born in Ardabil, Iran. She was born on 5 March 2007. She was of Azeri ethnicity.

Panahi was known as a swimmer and in the freestyle swimming of Azerbaijan girls (Azerbaijan Cup 2017) on 28–29 November 2018, she was able to take the third place (bronze) in the 50m and 100m freestyle swimming and achieve the third place (bronze) in the individual event (age group 11–12 years) and in the team freestyle swimming (age group 11–12 years) in the 4 x 50 meters event. These competitions were hosted at Abadgaran Pool in Tabriz.

Panahi was also selected as the top swimmer in the under-12 age group in the women's swimming league of East Azarbaijan province in 2017. In September 2018, she participated as a representative of East Azarbaijan Province in the Olympiad of the best swimming talents of Iran, and in the age group of 13–14 years, she achieved the sixth place in the country in swimming 50 meters backstroke.

== Death ==
Panahi was killed on 12 October 2022 after plainclothes forces stormed the Shahed Girls High School in Ardabil. Officials from the school had attempted to force the students to participate in a pro-government demonstration where they were to sing "Salam Farmandeh", an ideological song praising Ali Khamenei. Some of the schoolgirls gathered at the school refused to participate, in protest to the killing of Mahsa Amini, the government, and mandatory hijab. A parent of one of the students said that teachers and students were chanting "death to the dictator". Plainclothes security forces were summoned by the school officials and attacked the students, reportedly beating them and arresting 10 of the girls. Panahi was among 12 of the students who had to be taken to Fatemi Hospital following the attack. She died due to severe injuries, including internal bleeding.

== Reactions ==
The death of Panahi became a rallying cry for demonstrations, especially in Ardabil, with demonstrators demanding the end of the Islamic Republic. Large scale protests and demonstrations were held in Ardabil over Panahi's death on 15 October 2022.

The circumstances of Panahi's death have been disputed by officials. The Dana news network, linked to the Islamic Revolutionary Guard Corps, aired a video of an interview with a masked man who said he was Panahi's uncle. He said that Panahi had a congenital heart condition and had died in the middle of the night after being taken to the hospital, emphasizing that her death was "not related to any rally or rebellion". Iranian government officials and government news agencies have claimed Panahi had a heart disease. Her uncle gave an interview that has been publicized on state television to claim her death was caused by a heart problem, not security forces, similar to interviews from relatives of Nika Shakarami and Sarina Esmailzadeh. The parliament member for Ardabil, Kazem Musavi, has claimed Panahi died by suicide.

Hassan Ameli, a member of the Iranian Assembly of Experts and Imam Jumu'ah of Ardabil, said in an interview that the students should not have been taken to the Salam Farmandeh ceremony in Ardabil without the permission of their parents. He denied that Panahi was killed by security forces and supported the claim that she died naturally.

The Coordinating Council of Trade Union Organizations of Iranian Educators initially reported that the death of Panahi occurred as a result of the attack of plainclothes security forces at the school. Hours later, they amended their statement to say that they could neither confirm nor deny the death of a student.

Ali Daei, a former Iranian football player and manager said: "Silence caused by the government's pressure against the protests and desecration of the students of Sharif University of Technology, where I have developed my scientific and knowledge bases in this institution, led today to the attack on innocent students in the schools of Ardabil. It caused the beating of the school students and shedding of the blood of my other daughters in my hometown Ardabil; this silence has the price of death and every day puts another heat in the heart of Iran, which is a betrayal of humanity and my country."

== See also ==
- Compulsory Hijab in Iran
- Human rights in Iran
- Iranian protests against compulsory hijab
