= Ahmad Motamedi =

Iranian politician (born 1953)

Seyyed Ahmad Motamedi
- احمد معتمدی
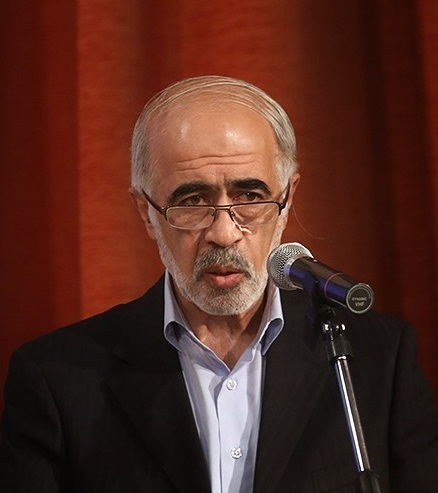

Minister of Information and Communications Technology
- In office 14 January 2001 – 24 August 2005
- President: Mohammad Khatami
- Preceded by: Mohammad Reza Aref
- Succeeded by: Mohammad Soleimani

Personal details
- Born: 1953 (age 72–73) Tehran, Iran
- Education: Pierre and Marie Curie University

Ahmad Motamedi (Persian: احمد معتمدی; born 1953 in Tehran) is an Iranian politician & member of Amirkabir University of Technology (Tehran Polytechnic)'s Electrical Engineering faculty.

He was the chancellor of Amirkabir University of Technology from June 2014 to September 2021. He was the Iranian Minister of Communication and Information Technology until August 24, 2005, and was replaced by Mohammad Soleimani.Seyyed Ahmad Motamedi, Head of the Scientific and Industrial Research Organization of the Ministry of Science and Riyal of the Ministry of Science and Technology (RIA) Currency Quota for the Year 2000 He entered the country claiming to be used for endorsement plans. Despite the claim, he sold imported materials to the open market, but according to the official theory of the Law Office of the Scientific and Industrial Research Organization, there is no evidence that the product entered the warehouse or sold and opened. The Culture News report, in connection with the misconduct, led to the conviction of a trustee and his crime partner (deputy chief financial officer of the organization), both of whom were convicted last year after numerous bans on archery. They appealed, but the court of appeals ultimately upheld the judgment of the second panel of the Tribunal. In his performance record, Moamadi was in charge of the reform of the Ministry of Post and Telegraph and Telephone, which was impeached because of a weak performance on November 7, without the presence of the head of reform, with much scrutiny. Four people were eventually reinstated in their post to consult with MPs to get their opinion. At that time he introduced himself to the forces of value and claimed his impeachment was political. Meanwhile, Motamedi is now a close friend of Hojatoleslam Hashemi Rafsanjani. He was also a member of the outlawed committee of Mir Hossein Mousavi for nine years and his appointment as chairman of Amir Kabir University was met with widespread criticism.

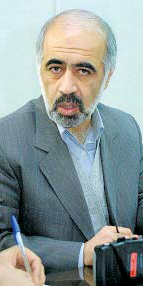
Motamedi in 2002

Motamedi earned his BS in Electronics from Amirkabir University of Technology in 1978 and his MS and PhD, both in Digital Electronics and Informatics Systems, from Pierre and Marie Curie University, France, in 1980 and 1983 respectively. He has been a faculty member of the Electrical Engineering department of Amirkabir University of Technology since 1984.
