= Sardar Iravani =

Sardār-e Īravānī was the title of Hossein Khan Sardar Qajar (1740–1830) and his brother Hasan Khan Qajar, the last governor of Erivan (Yerevan) 1807–28. This title was also used by Mohammad Hassan Khan Sardari Iravani, the son of Mohammad Khan Iravani, the preceding Khan of Erivan. He was the ancestor of family Sardari Iravani, an old Qajar family.

== See also ==
- Iravani (surname)
- List of famous ab anbars of Qazvin
