= Mohammad Modarres =

American nuclear engineer (born 1952)

- Mohammad Modarres
- Born: August 11, 1952 (age 74); Isfahan, Iran
- Education: Tehran Polytechnic Institute (B.S.); Massachusetts Institute of Technology (M.S., Engineer's degree, Ph.D.)
- Known for: probabilistic risk assessment, reliability engineering, probabilistic physics of failure
- Scientific career
- Fields: Mechanical engineering, Nuclear engineering, Reliability engineering
- Workplaces: University of Maryland, College Park
- Doctoral advisor: Norman C. Rasmussen

Mohammad Modarres is an Iranian-American scientist and educator in the fields of nuclear and reliability engineering. He is a Distinguished Scholar-Teacher and Nicole J. Kim Eminent Professor of Engineering at the University of Maryland. Within the University of Maryland A. James Clark School of Engineering, Modarres co-founded the world's first degree-granting graduate program in reliability engineering. The program has awarded more than 500 master's and doctoral degrees. Modarres served as director of the University of Maryland Center for Risk and Reliability until 2026. He has also served as an expert on reliability and risk analysis for commercial and government organizations, including the United States Department of Energy, the United States Nuclear Regulatory Commission, and NASA. Modarres has authored books and scholarly papers in nuclear engineering, reliability engineering, and risk analysis.

== Biography ==
Modarres received his bachelor's degree in mechanical engineering from Tehran Polytechnic Institute in 1975. He received a master's degree in mechanical engineering and an Engineer's degree in nuclear engineering from the Massachusetts Institute of Technology in 1977, followed by a Ph.D. in nuclear engineering from MIT in 1980.

His doctoral dissertation was titled Reliability analysis of complex technical systems using the fault tree modularization technique. After graduating from MIT, he worked as a risk and reliability scientist at SAIC. He joined the nuclear engineering faculty at the University of Maryland in 1982.

At the University of Maryland, Modarres has held several academic and administrative positions, including professor of nuclear engineering, director of the Graduate Program in Nuclear Engineering, and founding director of the Center for Technology Risk Studies and the Center for Reliability Engineering. The centers were later merged into the Center for Risk and Reliability, where he served as director until 2026.

== Research ==
Modarres's research focuses on probabilistic risk assessment, reliability engineering, probabilistic physics of failure, and functional modeling of complex engineering systems. His work includes the analysis of reliability, risk, and safety in applications such as nuclear power systems.

His more recent research includes failure-model development based on thermodynamics and information entropy, with applications to material degradation, component health assessment, and failure prediction.

== Awards and honors ==
- American Nuclear Society Tommy Thompson Award for nuclear safety
- FDA Commissioner's Special Citation for contributions to risk assessment
- Maryland Inventor of the Year Award in Information Sciences, 1996
- Life Fellow of the Institute of Electrical and Electronics Engineers
- Fellow of the American Nuclear Society
- Honorary doctorate (Doctor Honoris Causa), Universidad Da Vinci de Guatemala

== Selected books ==
- Mohammad Modarres and Katrina Groth, Reliability and Risk Analysis, 2nd ed., CRC Press, 2023.
- Andrew O'Connor, Mohammad Modarres and Ali Mosleh, Probability Distributions Used in Reliability Engineering, Center for Risk and Reliability Press, 2019. ISBN 978-0-9966468-1-9.
- Mohammad Modarres, Mehdi Amiri and Christopher Jackson, Probabilistic Physics of Failure Approach to Reliability: Modeling, Accelerated Testing, Prognosis and Reliability Assessment, Wiley, 2017.
- Mohammad Modarres, Mark Kaminskiy and Vasiliy Krivtsov, Reliability Engineering and Risk Analysis: A Practical Guide, 3rd ed., CRC Press, 2016.
- Mohammad Modarres, Risk Analysis in Engineering: Probabilistic Techniques, Tools and Trends, CRC Press, 2006.
- Charles Ramsey and Mohammad Modarres, Commercial Nuclear Power: Assuring Safety for the Future, Wiley, 1998.
- Mohammad Modarres, What Every Engineer Should Know About Reliability and Risk Analysis, Marcel Dekker, 1993.
