= Mohsen Koochebaghi Tabrizi =

Iranian Twelver Shia Marja

Grand Ayatollah Mirza Mohsen Koochebaghi Tabrizi
- محسن کوچه‌باغی تبریزی
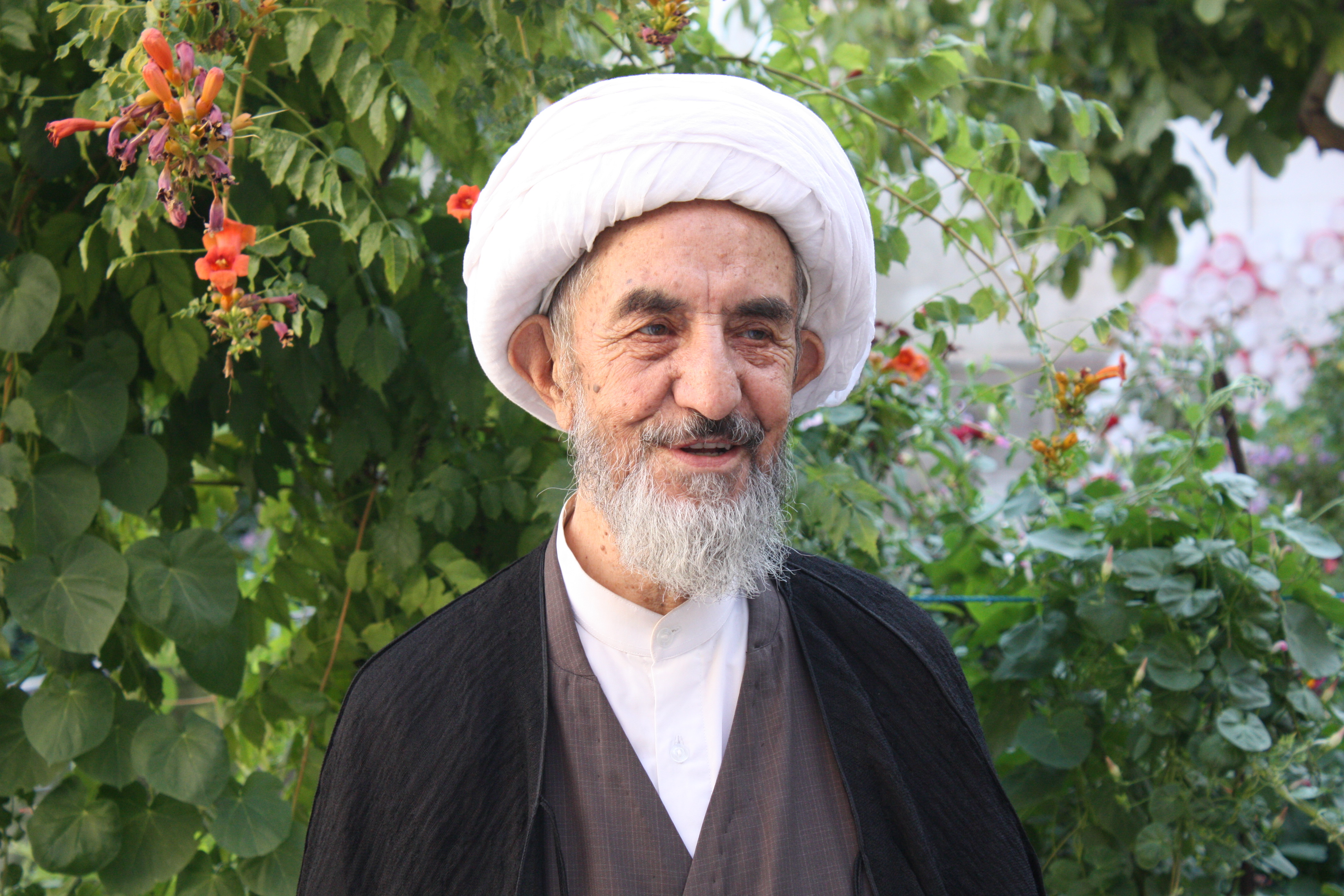
- Tabrizi in 2010
- Born: 9 January 1924; Tabriz, Iran
- Died: 3 August 2011 (aged 87); Tabriz, Iran
- Website: Official website

Grand Ayatollah Mirza Mohsen Koochebaghi Tabrizi (Persian: محسن کوچه‌باغی تبریزی; 9 January 1924 – 3 August 2011) was an Iranian Twelver Shia Marja.

== Early life ==
Tabrizi was born on 9 January 1924 in Tabriz, Iran. His father, Ayatollah Mirza Abbas Kochebaghi, was also a Grand Ayatollah (Marja'). Tabrizi studied in seminaries in Najaf, Iraq under Grand Ayatollah Abul-Qassim al-Khoei and Mirza Fataah Shahidi Tabrizi.

== Social works ==
He was famous for his religious careers in Tabriz. He was Friday Prayers Imam of Jameh Mosque of Tabriz for years.

=== Books ===
- Ad'iye-ye A'māl-e Haj (1958)
- Ad'iye-ye Namāz-e Shab (1961)
- Makāseb-e Āyatollāh Shahidi (1969)
- Basā'er-ol-Darajāt (1974)
- A'māl-e Haj va Madine (1979)
- Shafi'-ol-Moznebin (1988)
- Ojvebat-ol-Esteftā'āt (1995)
- Hāshiye bar 'Orve (2007)
- Al-Borhān 'alā Vojud-e Sāheb-ol-zamān (2010)

== Death ==
He died on 3 August 2011 in his house after a heart attack. His funeral was held on 4 August 2011 and he was buried in Vadi-e Rahmat of Tabriz.

== See also ==
- List of maraji
- List of deceased maraji
