= Samuel M. Jordan =

American missionary (1871–1952)

Dr. Samuel Martin Jordan (1871 – 1952) was an American presbyterian missionary in Persia (Iran).

Samuel Martin Jordan

He is sometimes referred to as the "father of modern education in Iran".

After graduating first from Lafayette College and then from the Princeton Theological Seminary in 1898, he moved to Tehran and spent 43 years as a missionary in Iran. Under his direction, the establishment that later took the name of Alborz High School was upgraded to the American College of Tehran and received a permanent charter from the Board of Regents of the State University of New York in 1932. Jordan served as president of the institution from 1899 until 1940. He received the first Scientific Medal of Iran in 1940.

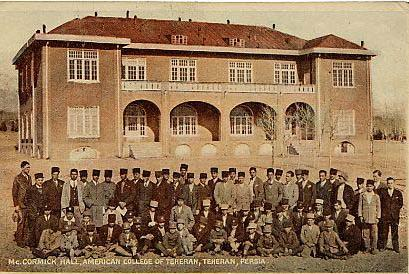
McCormick Hall (Alborz), American College of Tehran, circa 1930

In appreciation of his many services to higher education in Iran, a boulevard in Tehran, Jordan Boulevard, was named after him. Although after the 1979 Iranian Revolution this street's name was changed (to Africa and later to Nelson Mandela), the old name is still widely used. A statue of him, perhaps the only of a Westerner in Iran at the time, which is still on display in Amirkabir University, was dedicated in Alborz High School. Further, a theater in Tehran was named after him.

On 21 April 2005, Fariborz Maseeh and the Massiah Foundation pledged $2 million to create an interdisciplinary research center at UC Irvine named "The Dr. Samuel M. Jordan Center for Persian Studies and Culture" that will bring together scholars in Persian history, language, culture, art and literature.

== See also ==
- US-Iran relations
- Joseph Plumb Cochran
- James Hawkes (missionary)
