= Farrokh Saidi =

Iranian academic (1929–2026)

- فرخ سعیدی
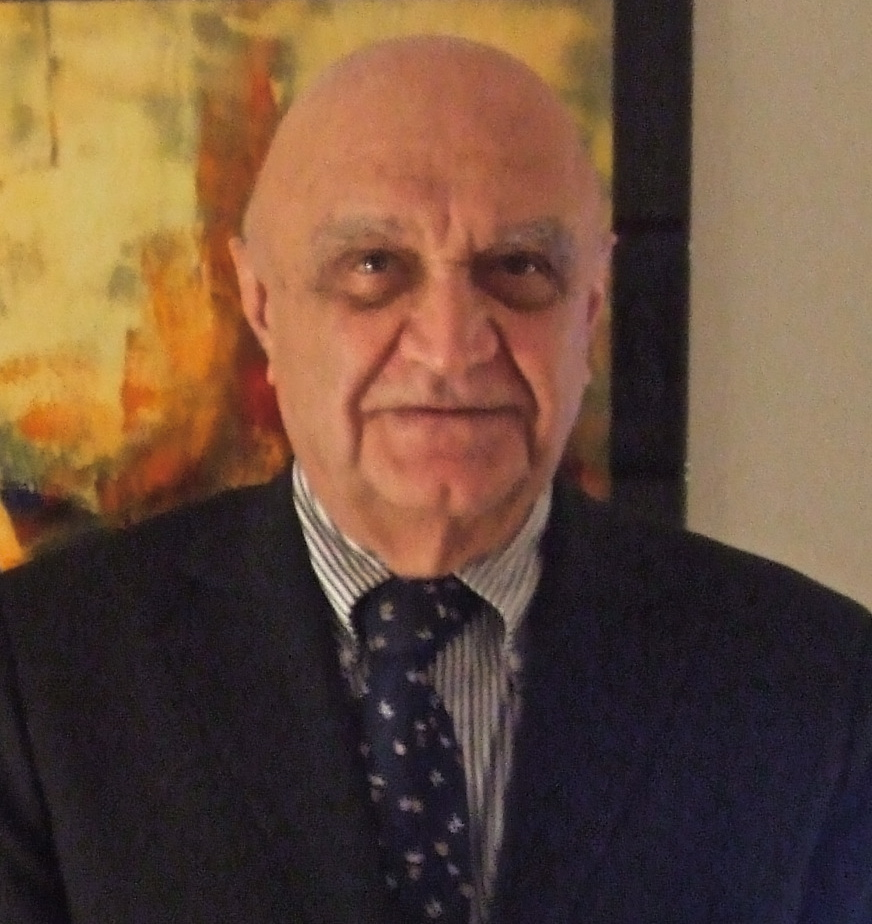
- Born: 22 November 1929; Tehran, Persia
- Died: 2 August 2026 (aged 96)
- Education: Harvard University; Cornell University

Farrokh Saidi (Persian: فرخ سعیدی; 22 November 1929 – 2 August 2026) was an Iranian surgeon, academician, Under-Secretary for Medical Education and Health Services of Iran, and the one time Dean of Medical School, Pahlavi University School of Medicine (now Shiraz University), Shiraz, Iran.

== Education ==
Farrokh Saidi finished the elementary school in Berlin, Germany and his high school in Tehran, Iran and later in Montclair, New Jersey in the United States. From 1947 to 1950, he spent his years of undergraduate studies at Cornell University, Ithaca, New York.

== Medical education ==
In 1950, he was admitted to Harvard Medical School in Boston, Massachusetts and received his medical degree (M.D.) in 1954. He spent a year of internship in Internal Medicine at Duke University Hospital in Durham, North Carolina. In 1955, he went back to Boston to start his residency in General Surgery at Massachusetts General Hospital, Harvard Medical School and completed his residency and a fellowship in Cardiac Surgery at Massachusetts General Hospital by 1960. He spent an additional year of training in Thoracic Surgery at Frenchay Hospital, Bristol, United Kingdom in 1961 under supervision of Professor Ronald Belsey.

== Career ==
After his return to Iran in 1961, he joined Nemazee Hospital in Shiraz as an attending surgeon and became an associate professor of surgery at Pahlavi University School of Medicine in Shiraz where he established a General Surgery Residency Program. He became Chief of Surgery at Saadi and Nemazee Hospitals in Shiraz and Professor of Surgery at Pahlavi University School of Medicine in 1963. Farrokh Saidi was the Dean of Medical School, Pahlavi University School of Medicine (now Shiraz University) during 1968–1969. Again, he returned to Boston to complete a two-year fellowship in Pediatric Surgery at Massachusetts General Hospital. He moved to Tehran in 1972 and was Chief of Surgery at Hossein Fatemi Hospital, Rey, and subsequently Chief of Surgery at Bank Melli Hospital, both in Tehran, Iran. In 1985, he joined Shahid Beheshti University of Medical Sciences as a Professor and Chief of Surgery, and established the Thoracic Surgery Fellowship program at Modarres Hospital in Tehran.

During 1974–1975 and before the Iranian revolution, Farrokh Saidi served as the Under-Secretary for Medical Education and Health Services of the Minister of Education, Abdol-Hossein Samiy (also Samii). He has been a permanent member of the Iranian Academy of Medical Sciences since 1990. He has been a Fellow of the Third World Academy of Sciences (TWAS) since 1987. Farrokh Saidi has published extensively on surgical treatment of hydatid cyst and esophageal cancer.

In the early-mid 1990s, he founded the Iranian Society for the Study of Esophageal Cancer (ISSEC) and conducted a few studies on esophageal cancer targeting one of the highest incidence cancers in the World in northeast Iran.

Saidi was later a professor of Surgery Emeritus at Shahid Beheshti University of Medical Sciences and practiced general and thoracic surgery at Iran-Mehr Hospital in Tehran.

== Death ==
Saidi died on 2 August 2026, at the age of 96.

== Views ==
In November 1992, Farrokh Saidi, together with some 1,700 world's leading scientists, including the majority of Nobel laureates in the sciences, issued an appeal and warned that human activities inflict harsh and often irreversible damage on the environment and on critical resources and suggested a great change in our stewardship of the earth and the life on it, is required. This appeal was written and spearheaded by Henry Way Kendall, former Chair of Union of Concerned Scientists.

In a correspondence to the Nature (journal) in December 2009, he was among thirteen prominent Iranian academicians who deplored the cases of alleged plagiarism by Iranian scientists. The authors believed Iranian culture places an excessive emphasis on the value of academic credentials, both for advancement in official professions and in social standing and especially, Iran's political class has an unusual affinity for possessing academic distinctions and this accounts for a disproportionate share of academic fraud in this group.

== Memberships ==
- Diplomate, American Board of Surgery, American Board of Thoracic Surgery
- Fellow, American College of Surgeons
- Fellow, Royal College of Surgeons of England
- Hunterian Professor of Surgery, Royal College of Surgeons of England
- Member, Royal Society of Medicine, England
- Founding Member, World Association of Hepato-Pancreato-Biliary Surgery
- Founding Member, Iranian Surgical Association
- Fellow, Third World Academy of Sciences
- Permanent Member, Iranian Academy of Medical Sciences

== Bibliography ==
- Surgery of Hydatid Disease, Farrokh Saidi, Saunders, 1976, Philadelphia, ISBN 978-0-7216-7900-6
- A Guide to Persepolis, Pasargadae and Naghshe-Rostam, Farrokh Saidi, Behdid Publishers, 2001, Tehran, ISBN 964-6995-20-9
- راه چهارم: راهنمای دانشمندان جوان ایرانی (Eng. The Fourth Path: A Guide to Young Iranian Scientists), Farrokh Saidi, "Nakhle Danesh", 2005, Tehran, ISBN 964-6948-51-0
