= Salam Farmandeh =

2022 Iranian song about Imam Mahdi

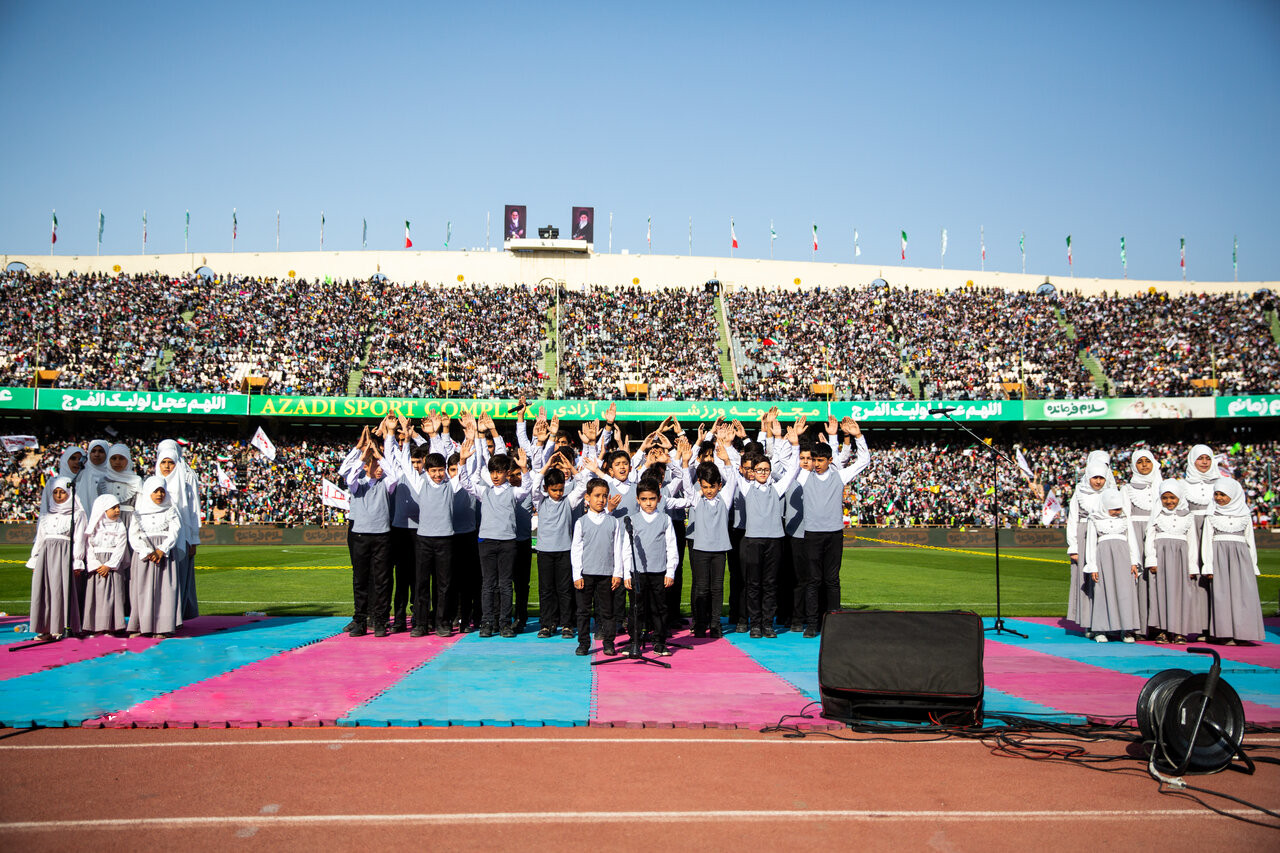
- Performing the anthem Salam Farmandeh in Azadi Stadium

Song by Abuzar Rouhi
- Language: Persian
- English title: Hello Commander
- Released: March 20, 2022
- Genre: Anthem
- Length: 7:38
- Songwriter: Sayyid Mahdi Bani Hashemi Langroudi
- Producer: Guilan IRIB TV

"Salam Farmandeh" (Persian: سلام فرمانده, Greetings Commander'), also known as 'Salam Ya Mahdi', is an originally Persian-language pro-government song produced by Iranian artist Abuzar Roohi, about General Soleimani, and Imam Mahdi and has been promoted by the Islamic Republic to be performed in large groups by children around the world to show loyalty to the Islamic Republic regime.

The song, a relatively long choir in the pop genre, was released in March 2022 just before the New Persian Year (Farvardin 1401) on social media and later received attention in April and May 2022. The song apparently is targeted at and highlights the contribution of the new generation in supporting the Islamic Revolution and its ideology. Organizations have been active in mobilizing school students to form choirs of the song in large groups, showcasing the largest one in Azadi Stadium.

== Cast ==
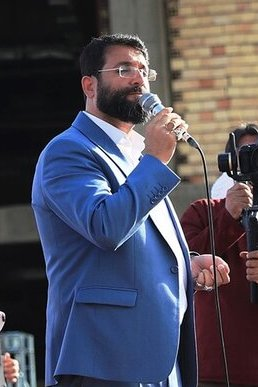
Abuzar Roohi, singer of "Salam Farmandeh"

The singer who sang "Salam Farmandeh" is Abuzar Roohi who performed it for Gilan IRIB TV, the music video of which debuted in March 2022. The music video was recorded in Jamkaran Mosque, directed by Mehraneh Behnahad, and produced by Mahyar Talebi. The songwriter is Mahdi BaniHashemi

== Mass performance at Azadi Stadium ==
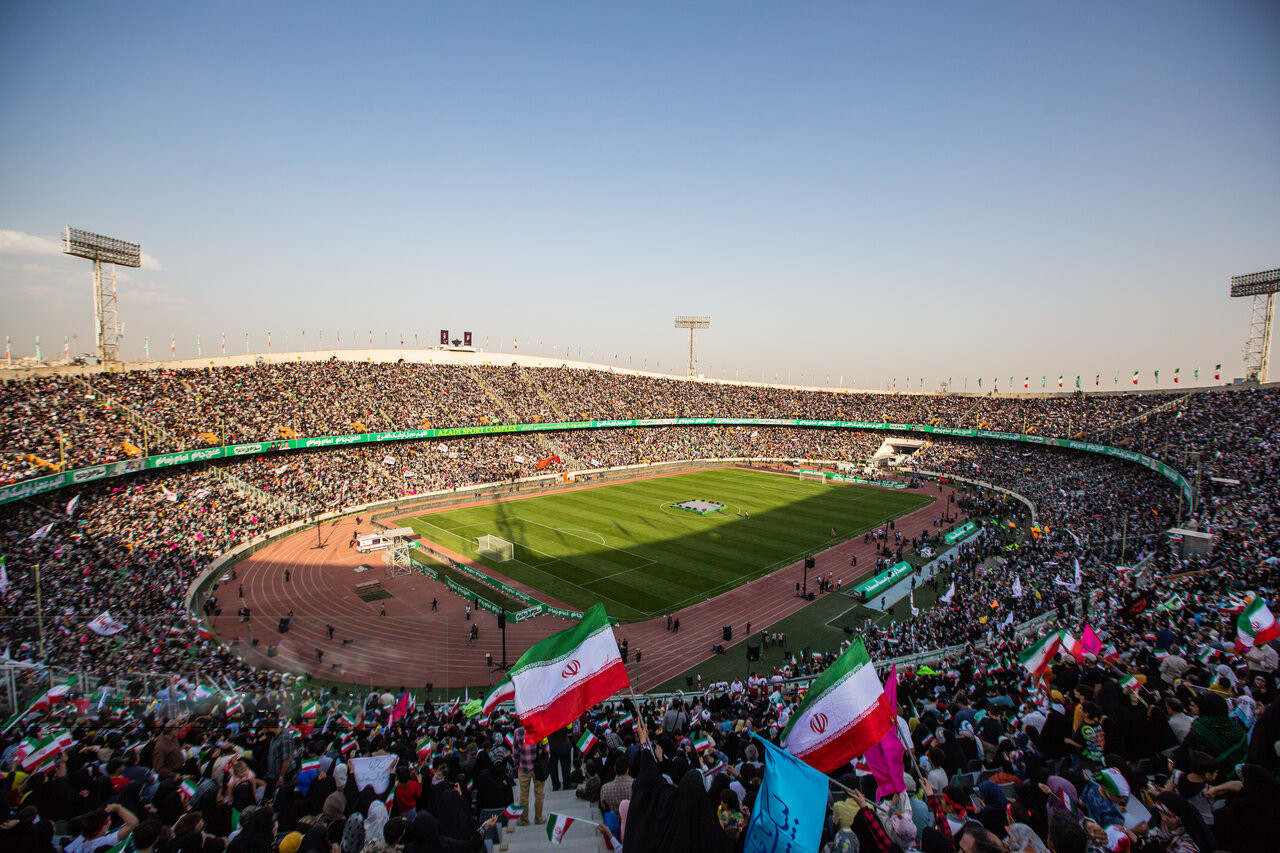
"Salam Farmandeh" performance at Azadi Stadium, 26 May 2022

On May 26, 2022, there was a large gathering in Azadi Stadium and Sports Complex in Western Tehran and its surrounding areas where some tens of thousands attended together with their children to perform the song in a choir orchestrated by the professional artists live. State media reported the gathering to be 100,000 in size.

== Chanting in other locations ==
Globally, this song is known as 'Salam Ya Mahdi'. The song has been also chanted in other countries according to news outlets and published content on social media.

The song has been translated into many languages including Spanish , French, Arabic, Urdu, Azerbaijani, Pashto, Kurdish, Malay, Swahilli and Kashmiri.
