= Mostafa Kamal Pourtorab =

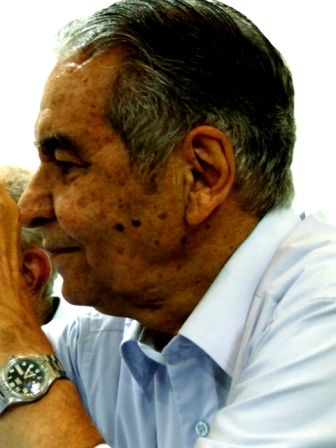

Background information
- Also known as: Mostafa Kamal Pourtorab
- Born: 14 September 1924; Tehran, Iran
- Origin: Iran
- Died: 22 June 2016 (aged 91)
- Occupations: Composer, musician
- Instruments: Bassoon, violin, tar

Mostafa Kamal Pourtorab (Persian: مصطفی کمال پورتراب, born 14 September 1924 – 22 June 2016) was an Iranian musician, composer, music teacher, and music theorist. He was a member of the founding board and vice-president of the Supreme Council of the Iranian House of Music.

== Biography ==
Mostafa Kamal Pourtrab was born on 14 September 1924 in Tehran. His father was a Soviet military officer who came to Iran after the October Revolution of 1917 and got married. He was the first child in the family.

His father was familiar with playing Tar, and since his son was also interested in music, he bought him a Neylabak at an early age. A year later, Mostafa turned Neylabak into a flute, and at the age of nine, he played the flute at a ceremony in Hamedan. In 1940, after finishing primary school, he moved to Tehran with his family and enrolled in the Higher Conservatory of Music to study in high school. In the first test, Mostafa's very sensitive ear caught the attention of the examiners, and they chose the difficult and little-known instrument of the Bassoon as his main instrument. He learned the bassoon from Czech masters who were employed by the conservatory in those years. Mostafa Pourtrab learned the bassoon from Yaroslavliza, the violin from Heshmat Sanjari, and Ataollah Khadem Misagh and the Tar from Moosa Maroufi. He also studied the theory of Iranian music with Ruhollah Khaleghi, and learned group singing from Rubik Grigorian and solfege from Fereydoun Farzaneh and Patma Garian.

In 1940, he worked as the conductor of two orchestras of the General Directorate of Fine Arts. In 1943, Mostafa Pourtrab studied the basics of harmony with Ali Mohammad Khadem Misagh and in 1945, he obtained a diploma from the Higher Conservatory of Music in the field of theory and harmony. After graduating, Portrab worked for a time as a teacher of music in schools and then as a teacher of solfege and music theory in elementary and high school music conservatories. In 1951, at the suggestion of Pourtrab, the field of composition was established in the Higher Conservatory of Music and he was one of the first students in the field of composition. Portrab was able to complete his studies in this field after 9 years. His dissertation was his first serious piece in the form of a symphony.

After teaching harmony for a while and then teaching composition at the conservatory, he was assigned to teach. In 1966, using a French government scholarship, he went to Paris to continue his studies and studied further in the field of counterpoint and harmony. He also enrolled in musicology at the Sorbonne and used the teachings of Nadia Boulanger. After returning to Iran, he used the experiences of Thomas Christian David in composing for about four years.

He became the director of Iran Conservatory of Music between 1971 and 1973. In 1977, the Board of Art Review and Evaluation of the teachers of the Higher Conservatory awarded him the title of professor.

He also educated many students in higher and national conservatories, the Faculty of Fine Arts, University of Tehran, the University of Arts, the Islamic Azad University, and the universities of applied sciences. He was also a member of several specialized music councils in the former Ministry of Culture and Arts, the Ministry of Culture and Islamic Guidance, the Academy of Languages, the Iranian Institute of Musicological Research, the Younes Musical Association and several other international associations and institutes, as well as the director of music conservatories. In 2008, he was selected as a permanent figure in Iranian music.

== Artwork ==
=== Music ===
- A piece in Chahargah
- Sonata for piano
- Sonata for violin and piano
- Two pieces for group singing on Khayyam's quatrains
- Fantasy for string orchestra
- March in Major for Symphony Orchestra
- Fairy Dance in Faminour
- Two-Piece Silent Song for String Orchestra
- Seven-figure ballet based on the famous military system. Haft Peykar had a successful performance in Rudaki Hall before the Iran revolution.

=== Books ===
- Music Theory
- An introduction to the basics of composition
- Favorite songs for piano

==== Translation ====
- Counterpoint in simple language
- Analysis of music for young people, by Leonard Bernstein
- Harmony on Piano Knobs by Carl Pedren
- Tasks and Problems Solving Music Theory and Teaching Calligraphy and Calligraphy, by Atore Putsuli
- Modal Counterpoint Training, by Marcel Doper
- Classical Harmony
- Modern Music, by Maurice Loro
- Mozart, by Ian McLean
- The Troubled Life of Tchaikovsky, by Herbert Welsotuk
- Hannon, by Charles Louis (Editor)
- Modern Harmony (Explanation and Application), by Eaglefield Hall
- Scientific and Practical Harmony, by Henry Sarley
