= Ali Tabrizli =

Iranian poet and writer (1929–1998)

- علی تبریزلی
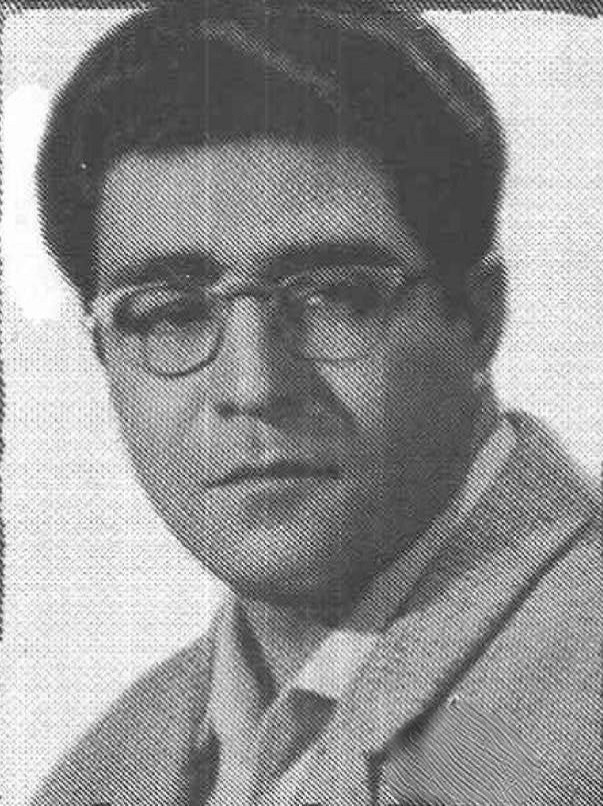
- Born: 25 June 1929; Tabriz, Pahlavi Iran
- Died: 18 January 1998 (aged 68); Tehran, Islamic Republic of Iran
- Writing career
- Notable works: Literature and nationality

Ali Tabrizli (Persian: علی تبریزلی; 25 June 1929 – 18 January 1998) was an Iranian poet, writer, publisher. He laid the foundation of the "Atropat" publishing house. In this publishing house, he prepared and published several books, including "Works of Aliaga Vahid", "Azerbaijani melodies and folk songs", "Koroglu" epic, "Collections of poems from Azerbaijani classical literature", "Divan of Fuzuli", "Poems of Salman Mumtaz", and several others.

He was imprisoned by SAVAK for his activities and spent 6 years in prison

== Biography ==
Ali Tabrizli was born on 25 June 1929 in the Munajjim neighborhood of Tabriz. He received his primary education in local elementary schools and continued his education at the Rushdiyya school. During the period of the Azerbaijan Democratic Republic, he received education in his native language at school. Later, he migrated to Tehran with his family. He published his first book titled "Poems of Ali Tabrizi". Later, he established the foundation of the "Atropat" publishing house and founded several literary associations. He began collecting examples of Turkish folklore by traveling to different regions. He compiled a two-volume book titled "Shah Ismail", covering the life and poetry of Shah Ismail, and in 1955, he collected and published the "Asli and Kerem" epic, which he transcribed from oral tradition.

In 1959, the poet Hasan Majidzadeh, along with Savalan, published "The Complete Works of Aliaga Vahid", and in subsequent years, they prepared and published several books, including "Azerbaijani Songs and Ballads" (in two volumes), the "Koroglu" epic, "Selected Poems from Azerbaijani Classical Literature", "Divan of Fuzuli", "Poems of Salman Mumtaz", and several others. In his work "Literature and Nationalism", he touched upon various issues, particularly focusing on the history of the Turks living in Iranian Azerbaijan, their national identity, and the existing identity problems there. While preparing Savalan's work "Apardı seller sarani" for publication, the printing house was raided by SAVAK, the published and prepared books were confiscated, and he himself was arrested. After six years of imprisonment, he was released. Following his release, he compiled and published a Turkish-Persian dictionary titled "Qud Amuz".

On 18 January 1998 he died in Tehran and was buried in the Vadi-e Rahmat in Tabriz.

== Works ==
- Ghazals of Ali Tabrizi
- Tears
- Literature and Nationality
