= Homayoun Sanaatizadeh =

Iranian writer and translator

Homayoun Sanaatizadeh (Persian: همایون صنعتی زاده; 1925 in Tehran – 2009 in Kerman, Iran) was an Iranian writer, translator. Homayoun Sanaatizadeh [also known as Homayoun San'ati] was the son of Abdulhussain Sanʿatizadeh Kermani (1895–1973). His father was a writer-merchant and part-time bookseller known for his pioneering work in science fiction and utopian fiction in modern Persian literature. His mother, Qamar Taj, belonged to the Dowlatabadi family, which was renowned for advocating the public schooling system in Iran. Sanʿatizadeh had notable relatives, including his uncle Yahya Dowlatabadi (1862–1939), an educationalist, and his aunt Sediqeh Dowlatabadi (1882–1961), a women's rights activist.

Sanʿatizadeh commenced his primary education at the Zoroastrian School in Tehran, currently known as Jamshid Jam. Sanʿatizadeh completed his primary schooling in Kerman, a province in southeastern Iran, before relocating to Tehran to attend Alborz College. Besides his writings he is well known for his attempts to fight against poverty and illiteracy. He is the founder of Pars paper, Offset printing, pocket books, and Golab Zahra. Sanaatizadeh was the first manager of the Iran's branch of the Franklin Book Programs. Sanʿatizadeh established an extensive network of social and intellectual connections for the Tehran Branch of the Franklin Book Programs. Beside the regular translation programs, the special projects of this Branch included supporting workshops for textbook writers and publishers, sponsoring the Persian Encyclopedia project, and collaborating with Iran's Ministry of Education.

== Critical reception ==
A 2012 documentary is made by Pirooz Kalantari under the title "Homayoun" in which the filmmaker tries to trace the challenges and the course of life of Homayoun Sanaatizadeh through his writings and the memories of those close to him.
