= Amirkabir University of Technology =

Public university in Tehran, Iran

Amirkabir University of Technology (Tehran Polytechnic)
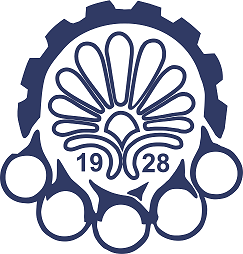
- Other name: Tehran Polytechnic
- Type: Public
- Established: 1928; 98 years ago
- Affiliations: MSRT; FUIW; IAU; ICTP; TWAS
- Chancellor: Abbas Soroush
- Faculty: 480
- Students: 13,593
- Undergraduates: 5,514
- Postgraduates: 8,079
- Location: Tehran, Iran; 35°42′16″N 51°24′32″E
- Campus: Urban
- Website: aut.ac.ir/en

Amirkabir University of Technology (AUT) (Persian: دانشگاه صنعتی امیرکبیر), also called the Tehran Polytechnic, is a public technological university located in Tehran, Iran. Founded in 1928, AUT is the oldest technical university established in Iran.

It is referred to as the 'Mother of Engineering Universities'. Acceptance to the university requires scoring among the top 1% of students in the Iranian University Entrance Exam, known as 'Konkour'

The university was founded in 1928 as a technical academy and was further transformed into a full-fledged university by Habib Nafisi in 1956. After that, it was extended and enlarged by Dr. Mohammad Ali Mojtahedi, during the Pahlavi dynasty. Named the Tehran Polytechnic, it initially offered five engineering degrees, namely; Electrical and Electronics, Mechanical, Textile, Chemistry, and Construction and Infrastructure. Six months before the 1979 Iranian Revolution, Tehran Polytechnic, was renamed after the Iranian prime minister Amir Kabir (1807–1852).

The university now has 18 science and engineering departments, dozens of research groups and laboratories, and three other affiliated centers, located in Garmsar, Bandar Abbas and Mahshahr. Around 13,400 students are enrolled in undergraduate and graduate programs. AUT has more than 500 full-time academic faculty members and 550 administrative employees. The executive branch consists of four departments that receive participation from councils in planning and administering affairs.

AUT has signed agreements with international universities for research and educational collaboration. There is a joint program between AUT and the University of Birmingham.

AUT is the pioneer of sustainable development in Iran and established the Office of Sustainability in 2011. The activities of this office contribute to the AUT campus by reducing energy consumption, costs, and emissions, and also provide student coursework, volunteer opportunities for students, as well as research and education academic activities on sustainable development.

== History ==
The establishment and formation of the Amirkabir University of Technology dates back to October 1956 by Eng. Habib Nafisi (حبیب نفیسی). The core of the university was formed at that time under the name Tehran Polytechnic in order to expand the activities of two technical institutes: the Civil Engineering Institute and the Higher Art Center. After Habib Nafisi, the founder of Tehran polytechnic, Dr. Abedi, became the president of the university for a few months until Dr. Mohammad Ali Mojtahedi, the principal at the Alborz High School, was appointed as president of the university in 1963.

The university has grown into a national center of science and engineering and its undergraduates number more than 7,000, with a further 6,400 graduate students. The university boasts 35 undergraduate majors, around 90 M.Sc. majors and 36 Ph.D. and post-doctoral programs.

== Rankings and reputation ==
University rankings
- Amirkabir University of Technology

Global – Overall
- ARWU World: 601–700 (2022)
- QS World: =456 (2026)
- THE World: 601–800 (2023)
- USNWR Global: 712 (2025)

In the 2013 Shanghai Rankings, Amirkabir University of Technology's Computer Science program was ranked 100–150 globally. In 2014, its Engineering Sciences program was ranked 151–200 globally. The Polymer Engineering Department of Amirkabir University of Technology is the first and most prestigious Polymer Engineering program in Iran.

The university also ranked first among Iranian universities in the 2014 CWTS Leiden Ranking. In the 2014 U.S. News & World Report subject rankings, Amirkabir was ranked 89th globally in Engineering Sciences and 90th in Computer Science.

The 2021 QS World University Rankings ranked Amirkabir University 477th globally and second among Iranian universities, behind Sharif University of Technology, which was ranked 407th.

== Campuses ==
=== Tehran ===
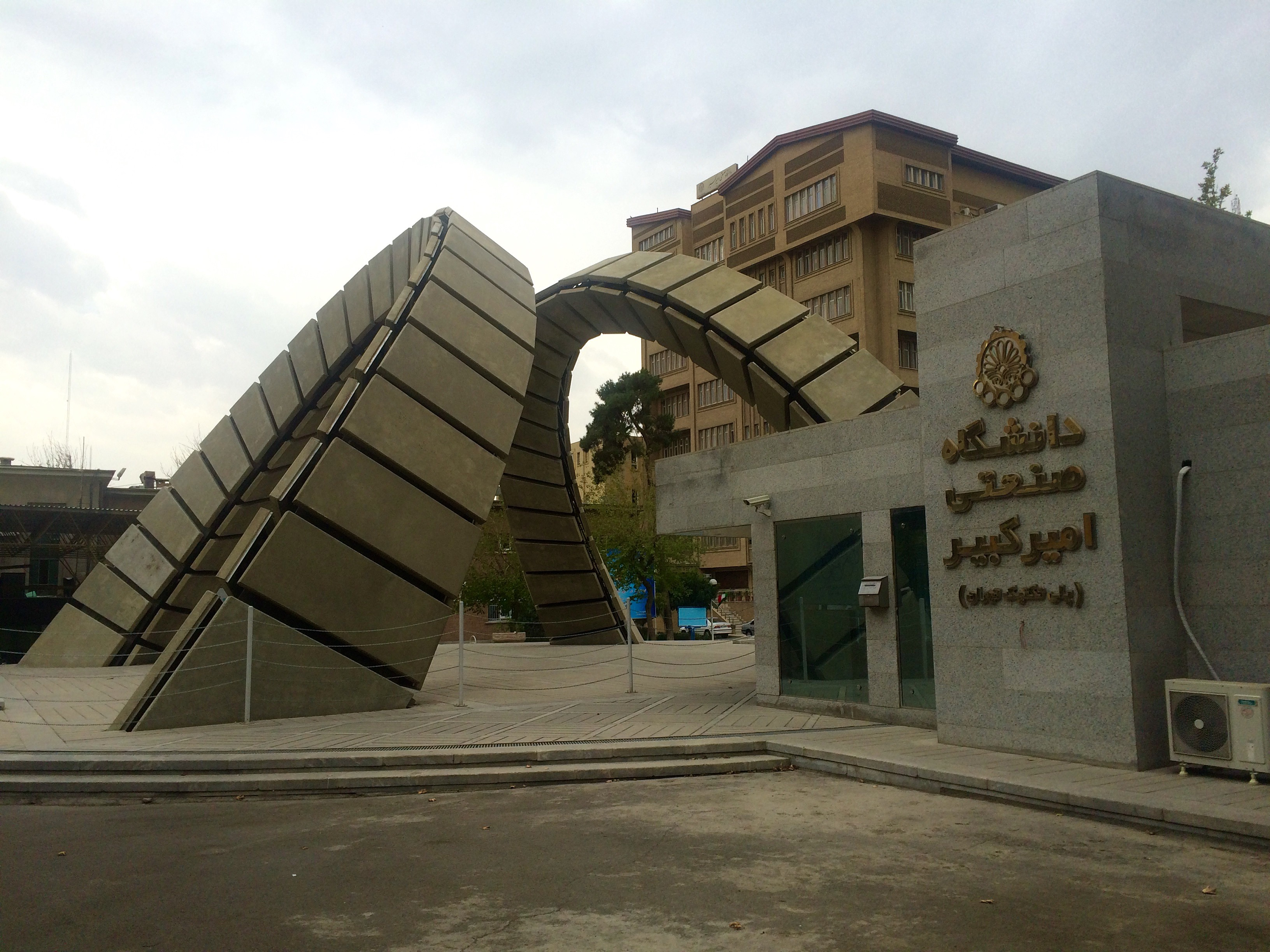
University's main entrance

The main campus of the Amirkabir University of Technology is in Tehran, Iran. It is located close to Vali Asr Crossroads, the intersection of Enghelab Street and Vali Asr Street, in the very center of Tehran City. Many students commute to AUT via the subway by Teatr-e Shahr Metro station.

=== Mahshahr ===
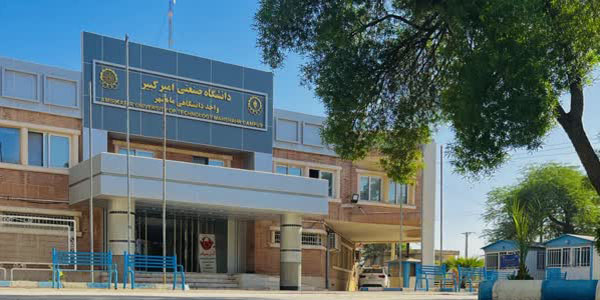
Mahshahr Campus

The Mahshar campus of AUT was constructed in the province of Khouzestan in 2001 in order to establish close cooperation with the national company of petroleum industries.

=== Coastal Marine ===
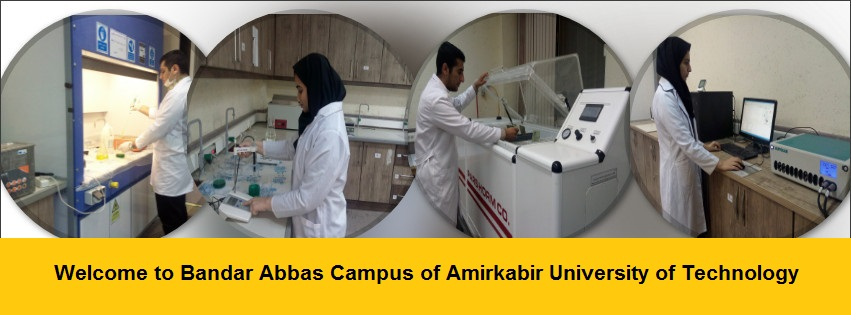
Coastal Marine Campus

The Coastal Marine campus of AUT has been established in the province of Bandar Abbas, which is the center of marine industries in Iran.

=== Garmsar ===
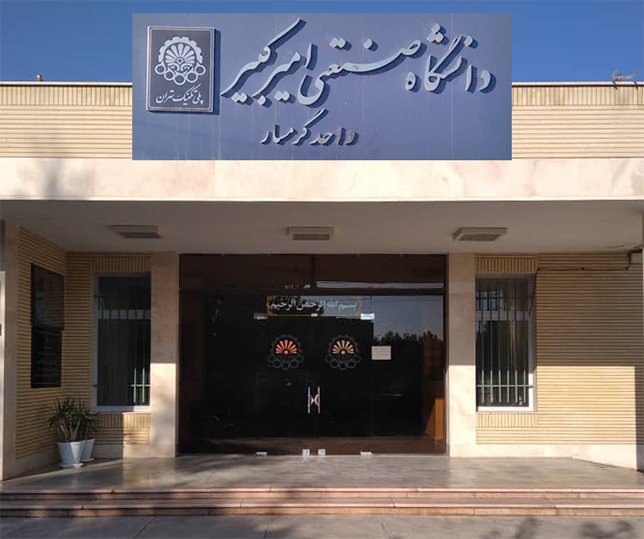
Garmsar Campus

The Garmsar campus of AUT has been constructed in the province of Semnan in order to establish close cooperation and distance with the main campus in Tehran.

=== Kish ===
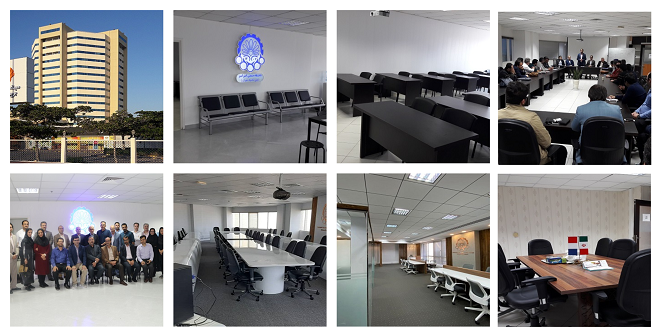
Kish campus

The Kish campus of AUT has been constructed in the province of Island Kish in order to establish close cooperation and distance with the main campus in Tehran.

== Library ==
The library and document center at AUT, the largest technical and engineering library in Iran's capital, is one of the richest academic libraries in the technical and engineering field in the region. The library includes a central library and 16 satellite libraries in Tehran and Bandar Abbas.

== Departments ==
AUT has 18 departments, including:

- Management, Science And Technology
- Electrical Engineering
- Biomedical Engineering
- Polymer and color Engineering
- Mathematics and Computer Science
- Chemical Engineering
- Industrial Engineering & Management Systems
- Civil And Environmental Engineering
- Physics and Energy Engineering
- Computer Engineering
- Mechanical Engineering
- Mining Engineering
- Textile Engineering
- Petroleum and Geoenergy Engineering
- Maritime Engineering
- Aerospace Engineering
- Chemistry
- Materials and Metallurgical Engineering

Aut Has 4 Campuses, In:

- Garmsar
- Coastal Marine
- Mahshahr
- Kish

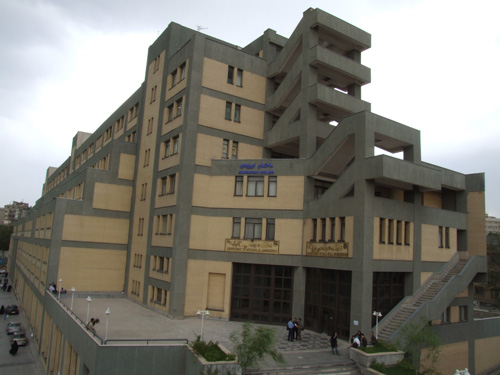
Departments of Mechanical Engineering and Electrical Engineering

== Scientific associations ==
Scientific associations exist to help students transform themselves into contributing members of the professional community. Course work develops only one range of skills.

University association websites are as:

- Scientific Association of Physics

== Presidents ==
- Habib Nafisi (1958–1962)
- Prof. Rahim Abedi (1962)
- Prof. Mohammad Ali Mojtahedi (1962–1965)
- Prof. Bina (1965–1967)
- Prof. Yeganeh Haeri (1967–1969)
- Prof. Mohammad-Jafar Jadd Babaei (1969–1972)
- Prof. Kayvan Najmabadi (1972–1975)
- Prof. Hossein Mahban (1975–1977)
- Prof. Siroos Shafiei (1977–1978)
- Prof. Miri (1978)
- Prof. Mahdi (1978–1979)
- Prof. Hasan Farid Alam (1979)
- Prof. Kamaleddin Nikravesh (1980–1981)
- Prof. Hassan Rahimzadeh (1981–1982)
- Prof. Aliakbar Ramezanianpour (1982)
- Prof. Reza Hosseini Abardeh (1982–1983)
- Prof. Mohammad Hossein Salimi Namin (1983–1996)
- Prof. Alireza Rahai (1996–1997)
- Prof. Abdolhamid Riazi (1997–2001)
- Prof. Ahmad Fahimifar (2001–2005)
- Prof. Alireza Rahai (2005–2014)
- Prof. Ahmad Motamedi (2014–2021)
- Prof. Hassan Ghodsipour (2021–2023)
- Prof. Alireza Rahai (2023–2025)
- Prof. Abbas Soroush (2025 to present)

== Research and innovation ==
AUT is a public university, and the government of Iran partly provides its research funding. AUT has cooperation with industrial companies, especially in the oil and gas industries. As a result, many research projects in the university are funded by industrial companies.

The Amirkabir University of Technology was appointed as a Center of Excellence by Iran's Ministry of Science and Technology in the fields of Biomechanics, Power Systems, Radiocommunication systems (RACE) and Thermoelasticity.

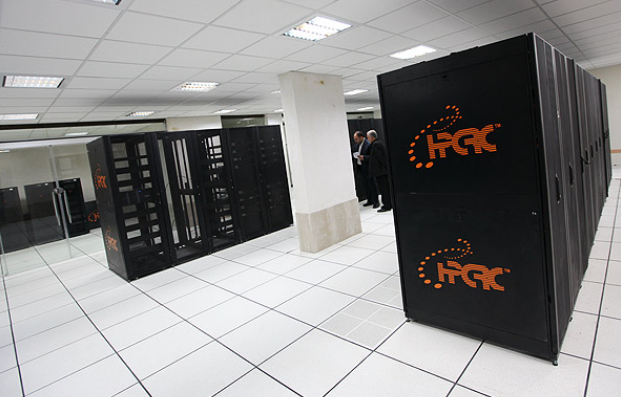
Supercomputer of AUT

The university houses a supercomputer which has a speed of 34,000 billion operations per second. The computer is available for both university affiliated as well as non-affiliated research.

Amirkabir Journal of Science and Technology is a scientific journal which publishes research achievements of academic and industrial researchers in all engineering and science areas.

The AUT Journal of Mathematics and Computing (AJMC) is a peer-reviewed journal that publishes original articles, review articles and short communications in all areas of mathematics, statistics and computer sciences.

Research and Technology Center of AUT is an office which collaborates with industries and universities in order to improve research level in the university.

In 2012, Fars News Agency reported that the "President of Iran's Amirkabir University of Technology Alireza Rahaei announced the country is preparing to put a new home-made satellite, called Nahid (Venus), into orbit in the next three months".

== Notable alumni and faculty ==
=== Science and technology ===
- Abolhassan Astaneh-Asl, Iranian-American professor emeritus of civil engineering, University of California, Berkeley
- Mohammad Reza Eslami, professor of mechanical engineering, one of the top 20 most cited scientists of Iran
- Reza Iravani, professor of electrical engineering, University of Toronto
- Mohammad Modarres, Iranian-American professor of mechanical and energy engineering, University of Maryland, College Park

=== Industry ===
- Bahaedin Adab, co-founder of Karafarin Insurance Co. and Karafarin Bank, former deputy chairman of the board of director of the Industry Confederation of Iran, former chairman of the board of directors of the Syndicate of Construction Companies of Tehran

=== Politics ===
- Abbas Abdi, political activist
- Bahaedin Adab, former member of parliament from Kurdistan (Sanandaj, Kamyaran, Divandareh), co-founder of the Kurdish United Front
- Ali Afshari, political activist
- Mohsen Mirdamadi, secretary general of Islamic Iran Participation Front, the largest reformist party in Iran
- Mostafa Mirsalim, former minister of Islamic Culture and Guidance
- Ahmad Motamedi, former minister of Communication and Information Technology
- Mohammad Saiidi-Kia, former minister of Housing and Urban Development and former Director of Bonyad Mostazafan
- Majid Tavakoli, prominent Iranian student leader, human rights activist and political prisoner
- Behzad Nabavi, former minister of industry and former deputy speaker of the Parliament of Iran
- Ahmad Vahidi, former minister of defense
- Ezzatollah Zarghami, former president of the Islamic Republic of Iran Broadcasting (IRIB), Iran's television and radio organization

=== Other ===
- Reza Khoshnazar, novelist
- Mohammad Ali Mojtahedi, former dean of the university
- Davood Mirbagheri, screenwriter and film director

== See also ==
- List of Islamic educational institutions
- Amir Kabir newsletter
