= Mohammad Qahraman =

Iranian poet (1929–2013)

- محمد قهرمان
- Born: 1 July 1929
- Died: 18 May 2013 (aged 83)
- Resting place: Maqberat al-Sho'ara, Aramgah-e Ferdowsi
- Occupations: Poet, literary scholar
- Spouse: Fereshteh Qahraman
- Children: Ruzbeh Qahraman, Mohammad-Reza Qahraman
- Writing career
- Language: Persian
- Genre: Sabk-e Hendi ("Indian Style") Persian poetry

Mohammad Qahramān, also Ghahraman or Ghahreman, (Persian: محمد قهرمان; 1 July 1929 – 18 May 2013) was a Persian-language poet, scholar, and editor from Khorasan.

== Biography ==
Qahraman was born in the village of Amirabad, eight kilometers south of Torbat-e Heydarieh. His great-great grandfather was Hasan Ali Mirza son of Fath Ali Shah Qajar who had married a daughter of Eshaq Khan Qaraei-Torbati. Qahraman's mother died when he was five years old, and at age sixteen he lost his father as well; he was subsequently raised by his older sister. He was a high school classmate of Mehdi Akhavan-Sales in Mashhad, and continued to maintain a friendship with him after Qahraman moved to Tehran and continued his education at Alborz High School, where he studied literature. Qahraman went on to study judicial studies in the Faculty of Law at the University of Tehran. However, he never pursued work in the legal field, concentrating instead on poetry.

He wrote ghazals and was particularly inclined towards the so-called "Indian Style" (sabk-e hendi) of poetry. He knew the local language of Torbat-e Heydarieh well and wrote many poems in this local language in addition to Persian. The literary critic Mohammad-Reza Shafiei-Kadkani claimed that Mohammad Qahraman outshined even the poet-laureate Mohammad-Taqi Bahar when it came to such local poetry. Qahraman played an important role in the compilation and editing of Bahar's divan or collected works after the latter's death.

In 1960, he married Fereshteh Qahraman (his paternal uncle's granddaughter) and settled in Mashhad. From 1961 until his retirement, Qahraman worked as the librarian for the Faculty of Literature at the Ferdowsi University of Mashhad. During the same period, he organized a weekly literary society which met in his home. He published several collections of his poetry, and corrected and edited the divans of numerous other poets.

He died of cancer in 2013. After his death, Supreme Leader of Iran Ayatollah Khamenei offered official condolences on Qahraman's passing. In 2019, a street was named after him in Tehran.

== Awards ==
Recipient of the 9th annual Fajr International Poetry Festival award for his book Ru-ye jadeh-ye abrisham-e she'r ("On the Silk Road of Poetry").
