= International School of Management Excellence =

- Type: Private business school
- Established: 2006; 20 years ago
- Affiliations: All India Council for Technical Education; Bangalore University; University of Mysore
- Director: K.G. Garg; Nitin Garg; Vivek Garg; Tanuj Garg; Pallavi Jain
- Students: 800
- Location: Bangalore, Karnataka, India
- Campus: 5acres
- Colors: Formals and Smart casuals Navy blue Grey
- Website: www.isme.in

International School of Management Excellence (ISME) is a business school in India. The institute is located in Bangalore and was founded in 2006 by K. G. Garg. ISME is privately-held and run by NVT Quality Education Trust. The institution is approved by All India Council for Technical Education and has academic partnership with University of North Carolina, USA, Thunderbird School of Management, Arizona State University, USA, FHWS, Germany, University of New Castle, Australia, Singapore Institute of Management, Singapore, MDIS, Singapore.

This business school has set up an International Advisory Council for student exchanges, global faculty engagement, and research collaborations.

== History and overview ==
International School of Management Excellence was founded by K. G. Garg and established by NVT Quality Education Trust in 2006, in Bangalore. The governing body is NVT Quality Educational Trust, part of NVT Group. NVT Group is a professional certification, training and consulting service organization from 1995 and operates in India, South East Asia and Middle East. NVT Group also has founded National Public School, Whitefield & East, Bangalore. The Chairman of NVT Group is K. G. Garg, an alumnus of IIT Roorkee, and the Directors of ISME are Nitin Garg, an alumnus of IIT Bombay and Carnegie Mellon University, Vivek Garg, an alumnus of Purdue University, Tanuj Garg, an alumnus of Wharton Business School and Pallavi Jain, an alumnus of Wharton Business School.

== Accreditation ==
International School of Management Excellence is affiliated to Bangalore University for its BBA program and & BCome program and has an approval from AICTE for its Post Graduate Diploma in Management (PGDM). Fellow Program in Management. ISME is affiliated to University of Mysore for PhD in Management..Recently it has achieved accreditation for its Post Graduate Diploma in Management from EFMD Global.

== Accolades ==
=== Awards ===
- ISME received the Bangalore Management Association’s award for Top B School in Bangalore for Academic Excellence 2022.
- ISME was awarded Management College of the Year by Bangalore Management Association in 2017 by the eminent Padma Vibhushan Dr. D. Veerendra Heggade.
- In 2014, International School of Management Excellence was bestowed with Fast Emerging Private Management Institute Award by Brands Academy given by Vishwanathan Anand, an Indian chess grandmaster.
- The institute has also received the International Achievers Award for Education Excellence by Indo-Thai Chamber of Commerce, held at Bangkok, Thailand from Kiran Bedi.

=== Rankings ===
- Ranked 2nd Top B Schools of Super Excellence in India by Competition Success Review (CSR-GHRDC) 2022
- Top B School for Academic Excellence by Bangalore Management Association - 2022
- Ranked 34th best B School in India by Times B School Ranking 2021
- Ranked 3rd top emerging BBA Institute in India by Times BBA Education Ranking 2021
- Best ROI Management College of the Year | Higher Education Review
- Ranked 33rd Best B-School in India by Business India, 2017.

== Academic programs ==
- Post Graduate program in Management (AICTE approved)
- Post Graduate program in Management - Data Science & Analytics (AICTE approved)
- Bachelor of Business Administration (Bangalore University)
- Bachelor of Commerce (Bangalore University) – ACCA /US CPA
- PhD in Management (University of Mysore)
- Fellow Program in Management (AICTE Approved)
- 2 Years Weekend PGPM (Finance) + US CPA + Paid Internship
- 1 year Weekend PGPM (Finance) + US CPA
- 1 Year Weekend PGPM (Business Analytics) + Mu Sigma
