= James Bassett (missionary) =

James Bassett (1834–1906) was a born at Glenford, near Hamilton in Canada on 31 January 1834. He graduated from Lane Theological Seminary in Ohio in 1859. He then served as chaplain in the United States volunteer army during the American Civil War in 1862-3.

From 1863 until 1871 he held pastorates in the USA, at the Presbyterian Churches of Newark, New York and later at Englewood, Chicago in Illinois. In 1871 became a missionary for the Presbyterian board. He travelled extensively in Europe, and lived many years in the Ottoman Empire. From 1871 to 1885 he lived in Iran.

In 1872, under the auspices of the American Mission Board, he founded the first American mission at Tehran, Persia (now Iran). Under his supervision other mission stations were founded, and in 1882 he became senior missionary and head of the Eastern Mission of Persia.

He wrote a volume of Hymns in Persian (1875). He also wrote A Grammatical Note on the Simnuni Dialects of the Persian, Among the Turcomans (1880), Persia, the Land of the Imams - A Narrative of Travel and Resident 1871 to 1885 (1886) and Persia, Eastern Mission (1890).

He also translated the Gospel of Matthew into Turkmen, which was the first portion of the Bible in that language. He revised it in 1884 and these were published by the British and Foreign Bible Society.
