= Reza Iravani =

Mohammad Reza Iravani (in Persian: رضا ایروانی) is a professor in the Edward S. Rogers Sr. Department of Electrical and Computer Engineering at the University of Toronto. He holds the L. Lau Chair in Electrical and Computer Engineering in same department (for two consecutive five-year terms from 2004 to 2014).

== Education and career ==
After obtaining his BSc degree in 1976 in electrical engineering from Amirkabir University of Technology (Tehran Polytechnic), Iravani worked as a consulting engineer from 1976 to 1979. He then moved to Canada and received his M.Sc. and Ph.D. degrees from the University of Manitoba, Winnipeg, Manitoba, in 1981 and 1985, respectively. From 1985 to 1987, he was an assistant professor at the University of Windsor, Windsor, Ontario.

He became a fellow of the IEEE in 2003 for his "contributions to power engineering education and modeling, design, and control of power electronic converters for power system applications." In 2007, he became a fellow of the Royal Society of Canada. He is the editor-in-chief of the IEEE Transactions on Power and Advisory Editorial Board member of the International Journal of Electrical Power & Energy Systems. He is also the chair of the IEEE Power Engineering Society on T&D Subcommittee on General Systems. He is a registered Professional Engineer in the Province of Ontario, Canada.

Professor Iravani is one of the pioneers in the development of the control and the operational concepts of microgrids and active distribution systems. He is a member of the organization committee of the Microgrid Symposium and a member of the CIGRE C6 on integration of distributed resources in distribution systems.

Iravani is the founder and coordinator of the Centre for Applied Power Electronics (CAPE) at the University of Toronto through which he leads R&D activities of a group of 25 research engineers, graduate students, and post-doctoral fellows. RD&D activities of CAPE are mainly focused on the utility integration of distributed and alternative energy resources in the context of smart grid concepts. His research interests include application of power electronics in industrial and utility electric power systems, distributed generation and storage, renewable energy systems, modeling and analysis of electromagnetic transient phenomena in power systems, and power system dynamics and control.

== Select publications ==
- Semlyen, A., Ramirez, A. I., & Iravani, R. (2005). Harmonic domain characterization of the resonant interaction between generator and transmission line. IEEE Transactions on Power Delivery, 20(2), 1753-1762.
- Semlyen, A., Noda, T. & Iravani, R. (2004). Entirely harmonic domain calculation of multiphase nonsinusoidal steady state. IEEE Transactions on Power Delivery, 19(3), 1368-1377.
- Semlyen, A., Lima, L., & Iravani, R. (2003). Harmonic domain periodic steady state modeling of power electronics apparatus: SVC and TCSC. IEEE Transactions on Power Delivery, 18(3), 960-967.
- Semlyen, A., Ramirez, A. I., & Iravani, R. (2003). Modeling nonuniform transmission lines for time domain simulation of electromagnetic transients. IEEE Transactions on Power Delivery, 18(3), 968-974.
