= Iranian Oral History Project =

The Iranian Oral History Project was launched in 1981 at the Center for Middle Eastern Studies at Harvard University. It was directed by Habib Ladjevardi, who undertook the project at the encouragement of Edward L. Keenan. It recorded the memories of 134 individuals who played a significant role in, or witnessed, political events in Iran from the 1920s through the 1980s. Interviewees included former political activists, intellectuals, and government officials, such as Gholam-Hossein Sa'edi, Abolhassan Banisadr, and Karim Sanjabi. It produced about 900 hours of recordings and 18,000 pages of transcripts. The project was supported by National Endowment for the Humanities, the Ford Foundation, and Roshan Cultural Heritage Institute. This project has been listed among significant middle eastern studies sources.
