= Manuchehr Jamali =

Manuchehr Jamali (7 January 1929–5 July 2012) was a dissident Persian philosopher and poet. He is best known for his exposition and analysis of the Shahnameh of Ferdowsi and his research about ancient Iranian mythology. Burgwinkel has reviewed his works and the developments of his thoughts and philosophical ideas.

== Works ==
- Das Denken beginnt mit dem Lachen: die unsterbliche Kultur des Iran (Thinking begins with laughter: the immortal culture of Iran), 2009 co-authored with Gita Yegane Arani-May ISBN 978-1-899-16703-6
