= Iranian Society of Mechanical Engineers =

Mechanical engineering organization in Iran

Iranian Society of Mechanical Engineers (ISME) is an organization founded in 1991 by some Iranian Mechanical engineers and professors (among them: Dr. Mahdi Bahadori Nezhad, Mr. Mohammad Bagherian) to develop and enhance Mechanical Engineering in Iranian universities and industries. It is now responsible for annual mechanical engineering conference in Iran which is held in spring.

Other activities include: Publishing technical journal and contributing with ASME.

== Board of Managers ==
Board of Managers since 21 March 2011:

- Ali Akbar Saberi Zarghandi
- Mohammad Reza Eslami
- Ali Noori
- Mr. Sepehry
- Majid Safaraval
- Ali Ghaffari
- Siamak Kazemzadeh Hannani
- Mahmood Saghafi
