= Kurdish United Front =

- Abbreviation: KUF
- Secretary-General: Raouf Karimi
- Spokesperson: Azad Mohammadiani
- Founder: Bahaedin Adab
- Founded: January 3, 2006; 20 years ago
- Headquarters: Iran
- Membership (2006): 3,000
- Ideology: Kurdish nationalism; Reformism; Pacifism
- Parliament: 0 / 290

Website
- rojinwe.com

The Kurdish United Front (Kurdish: بەرەی يەکگرتووی كورد; Persian: جبهه متحد كرد; abbreviated KUF) is an ethnic political organization associated with Kurds in Iran which operates inside Iran. The organization works within the framework of constitution of Iran, eschews violence and separatism, while demanding democracy and minority rights. It is not an officially registered party or non-governmental organization.

According to a Chatham House report, it is permitted by the Iranian government, however policies "make it very difficult" for them to "operate freely and their positions, which must by necessity be moderate and mostly passive, cannot compete with firmer Kurdish nationalist rhetoric from outside Iran". It was established in January 2006 by former MP Bahaedin Adab and belongs to the reformist tendency.

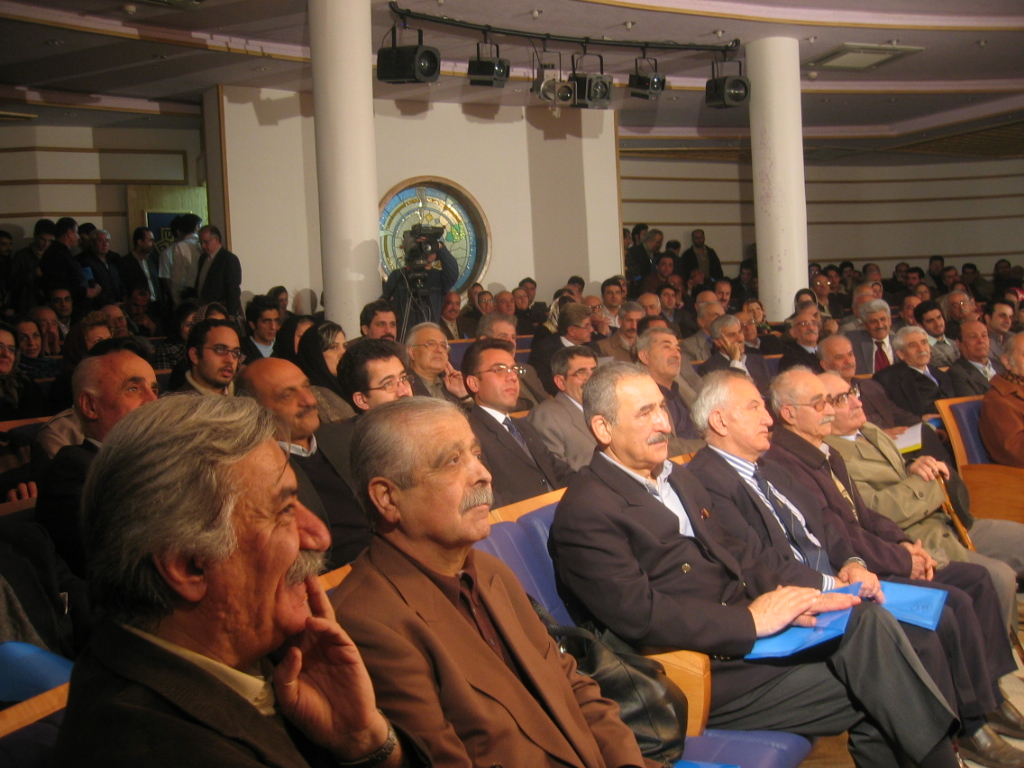
Audience at the gathering to commemorate the Front's first anniversary in 2007

According to Adab, the front aims to "raise awareness among Kurds of their rights and help them choose the right representatives in town councils and the parliament as these are the only ways they can get through to the authority".

Based on a 2006 poll, the majority of Iranian Kurds support the movement.
