= Shiraz Pasargad Higher Education Institute =

Research and education branch of Shiraz University

Coordinates: 29°36′21.0″N 52°27′20.3″E

Pasargad Higher Education Institute of Shiraz University
- Former names: Shiraz University
- Motto: Be The Best
- Type: governmental
- Established: 2005
- Chancellor: Dr. Doctor Zadeh
- President: Hasan
- Head: Roosta
- Academic staff: 89
- Administrative staff: 367
- Students: 200
- Location: Western Fajr Blvd, Shiraz, Iran, 71769-84578, Shiraz, Fars, Iran
- Campus: Urban
- Colors: Green
- Nickname: Pasargad Higher Education Institute of Shiraz University

Shiraz Pasargad Higher Education Institute is a research and education branch of Shiraz University. The university has over 2000 students in six Associate's degrees programs (A.S.), seven Bachelor's degrees programs (B.S.), and five Master's degree programs.
