= Sohrab Rohani =

Sohrab Rohani is a professor and former chairman of the University of Western Ontario's Department of Chemical and Biochemical Engineering. His main areas of research are crystallization of pharmaceuticals (polymorphism) and process control.

Rohani obtained his B.Sc. degree from Shiraz University in 1973 and a PhD from the University of Wales in 1977.

Rohani is a Fellow of the Chemical Institute of Canada. He received the Engineering Medal in Research and Development from the Professional Engineers Ontario in 2008.
