= Iraj Bashiri =

Iranian-born historian, linguist and translator (born 1940)

- ایرج بشیری
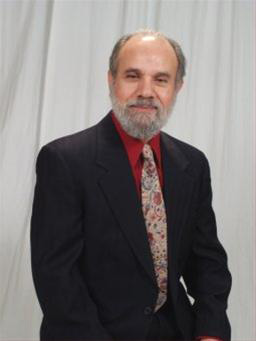
- Born: July 31, 1940 (age 86); Behbahan, Khuzestan, Iran
- Education: University of Michigan (M.A., Ph.D.)
- Occupations: Professor, historian, translator, linguist
- Employer: University of Minnesota (Emeritus)
- Known for: Persian literature; Central Asian studies
- Spouse: Carol (Sayers) Bashiri
- Children: Mariam, Manuchehr, Mehrdad
- Parent(s): Muhammad and Robab Bashiri
- Website: www.irajbashiri.com

Iraj Bashiri (ایرج بشیری; born July 31, 1940) is professor emeritus of history at the University of Minnesota, United States, and one of the leading scholars in the fields of Central Asian studies and Iranian studies. Fluent in English, Persian, Tajik, and several Turkic languages, Bashiri has been able to study and translate works otherwise inaccessible to the mostly Russian-speaking Central Asian studies community. Bashiri’s career focus started on Iran, and engaged also with Central Asia, notably the Tajik identity and the relations between Tajiks and the Turkic people of Central Asia, namely the Uzbeks.

== Biography ==
Iraj Bashiri was born on July 31, 1940, in Behbahan, Khuzestan Province, Iran. He completed early schooling in Dāmāneh and Dārān (Fereydan), and secondary schooling in Isfahan and Shiraz, receiving a mathematics diploma from Hāj Qavām High School in Shiraz in 1961. During high school, Bashiri showed an extraordinary interest in the English language and, in 1960, won first place in Iran’s nationwide English language competition in Ramsar, Iran.

From 1960 to 1963 he studied English language and literature at Pahlavi University (now Shiraz University), graduating at the top of his class. During his university years, he also worked as a regional correspondent for Kayhan newspaper in Fars Province, taught English at the Iran–England Cultural Society in Shiraz, and taught English literature at Pahlavi University. In 1964 he went to England and by 1966 moved to the United States. He received an M.A. in general linguistics (1968) and a Ph.D. in Iranian linguistics (1972) from the University of Michigan. His doctoral work examined Ibn Sīnā’s (Avicenna) philosophy of existence.

Bashiri is married to Carol L. Sayers. They have three children, five grandchildren, and one great-grandchild. His hobbies include writing realist fiction, fishing, and painting scenes of Central Asian and Iranian rural life.

== Degrees and Awards ==
Iraj Bashiri earned his Ph.D. in Iranian Linguistics (1972) and M.A. in Linguistics (1968) from the University of Michigan, following earlier studies at Liverpool University (Non-degree M.A., 1965) and Pahlavi University in Shiraz (B.A. cum laude in English Language and Literature, 1963). He received an Honorary Doctorate in History and Culture from Tajikistan State University (1996) and was named an Honorary International Academician by the Academy of Sciences of Tajikistan (1997).

At the University of Minnesota, he received the Distinguished Teacher Award (1980) and several research and curriculum development grants, including support from the McArthur Foundation and the Educational Development Center. His international recognition includes the IREX Research Residency for Tajikistan (1993–94), honoring his pioneering study Ethnicity, Nationalism, and Islam in Tajikistan.

Bashiri has been repeatedly invited to major scholarly and cultural events in Central Asia, including symposia hosted by the Academy of Sciences of Tajikistan and the government of Iran. He was among seven honorees recognized by the Academy of Sciences of Tajikistan on its 50th anniversary for significant contributions to Tajik culture.

Early in his career, he ranked as Iran’s top student in English language (1958) and earned a competitive national scholarship to study abroad (1964–68).

== Academic positions held ==
Bashiri began his academic career teaching English language in Iran before joining the University of Minnesota in 1972, where he founded the field of Central Asian Studies in 1987. Over the course of his tenure, he has served as assistant, associate, and full professor of Iranian and Central Asian Studies; Chair of the Department of Slavic and Central Asian Languages and Literatures; and Interim Director of the Institute of Linguistics, ESL, and Slavic Languages and Literatures. He has also held appointments in the Departments of History and South Asian Studies, coordinated the program in Middle Eastern and Islamic Studies, and taught as visiting associate professor at the University of Texas at Austin. From 2007 to 2008, he conducted research at the Institute of Oriental Studies and Written Heritage of the Academy of Sciences of Tajikistan. He continues to hold full graduate faculty status in the Department of History and in South Asian and Middle Eastern Studies.

== Publications and research ==
Bashiri's scholarship spans language, history, literature, and philosophy, with works published in English, Persian, and Tajiki languages.

=== Language and linguistics ===
He has authored foundational works in Iranian linguistics and Persian pedagogy, including "To Be" as the Origin of Syntax: A Persian Framework (1973) and the widely used textbook Persian for Beginners (1972–1991). His later studies, such as "Russian Loanwords in Tajiki and Persian Languages," and the translated edition Persidskij yazyk dla nachinaushchikh (2000), explore Persian–Tajiki linguistic contact and development.

=== History and philosophy ===
Bashiri's historical and philosophical research examines the evolution of Iranian thought and civilization within a broader regional context. Major works include Modern Iran: Caliphs, Kings, and Jurisprudents (2017), Modern Iranian Philosophy: From Ibn Sina to Mulla Sadra Shirazi (2014), and Ancient Iran: Cosmology, Mythology, History (2012; 2nd ed. 2016). His studies in The Impact of Egypt on Ancient Iran (2007) and The Samanids and the Revival of the Civilization of the Iranian Peoples (Irfon, 1998) extend his inquiry into comparative and regional history. The volume The History of the Civil War in Tajikistan complements these works and contributes to his broader examination of the historical development of the Iranian peoples.

=== Literature and Sufism ===
In literary studies, Bashiri is noted for his analyses of Sadegh Hedayat—Hedayat’s Ivory Tower (1974), The Fiction of Sadeq Hedayat (1984), and The Pearl Cannon (1986)——and for his writings on classical Persian literature and mysticism, including The Ishraqi Philosophy of Jalal al-Din Rumi (2008), Turk and Tur in Firdowsi’s Shahname (2009), and Mawlana Jalal al-Din (2010). His essays on Kamal Khujandi and the "Buddhist subtext of The Blind Owl." further integrate literary and metaphysical analysis. He has written on Sadriddin Aini's life and pre-Soviet Bukahara in "The Era of Saddridin Aini" (2017) and "The Bukhara of Sadriddin Aini," and on Chingiz Aitmatov's life in "Chingiz Aitmatov: Life and Works," (2008) in EurasiaCritic and has analyzed his "Jamila," and Farewell! Gulsary."

== Contributions ==
In pedagogy, Bashiri has made contributions through his widely used textbook Persian for Beginners, which has guided generations of students in mastering the Persian language. His doctoral dissertation, "To Be" as the Origin of Syntax, rooted in Avicenna's ontology, explores the philosophical depth of Persian verbs: budan ("to be") as a syntactic foundation, shodan ("to become") as a mark of transition, and kardan ("to do") as the essence of action. This linguistic-philosophical framework illuminates how Persian expresses existence itself as movement and transformation.

In literary analysis, Bashiri's interpretation of Sadeq Hedayat's The Blind Owl offers one of the most penetrating readings of the modern Persian novel. He views the work's cyclical narrative as a metaphysical allegory of desire and rebirth, in which the protagonist's encounter with his double and the black lotus symbolizes the self's entrapment in, and eventual transcendence of, existential recurrence. Bashiri connects this inner struggle to the collective condition of Iranians under oppression, proposing that self-recognition and destruction of illusion open the path to liberation.

Turning to classical Persian literature, Bashiri has redefined the understanding of farr——the kingly radiance or divine glory——as the moral and metaphysical essence of Iranian kingship. In his reading of Ferdowsi’s Shahnameh, farr emerges not as a mere sign of divine favor but as the principle that separates rightful Iranian rulers from their illegitimate Turanian rivals. Through such analyses, he links mythic narrative to enduring political and spiritual ideals of legitimacy and justice.

Bashiri has also reshaped the study of Persian Sufi poetry, challenging the long-held view that Hafez’s ghazals are merely collections of independent couplets. He demonstrates their structural unity and inner logic, reflecting the spiritual order of the khānaqāh and the dialectic between master and disciple. Extending this method to Jami’s verse, Bashiri suggests that the Persian ghazal——with its disciplined interplay of autonomy and cohesion——may have influenced the evolution of the English sonnet.

In ancient studies, Bashiri has traced deep conceptual and architectural parallels between Iran and Egypt. He identifies continuities between the Egyptian Valley of the Kings and the rock-cut tombs of Naqsh-e Rustam, and he draws illuminating analogies between the Egyptian principle of maat and the Iranian concept of farr—both expressing cosmic balance and the divine sanction of kingship. Through such cross-civilizational insights, he bridges the symbolic architectures of the ancient world.

Beyond his theoretical work, Bashiri has written biographies of major poets and thinkers from Iran, Tajikistan, and Kyrgyzstan, often accompanied by his own translations. His renderings of Persian verse are celebrated for their lyrical precision and cultural resonance, notably The Eagle (Parvīz Nātel Khānlarī), The Alley (Fereydūn Moshīrī), The Tree (Sayyed ʿAlī Garmārūdī), and The White Eagle and the Crow (ʿUnṣurī). His translation of the opening passage of Saʿdī's Gulistan has been especially praised for capturing both the rhythm and philosophical grace of the original.

== Editing and translation ==
Bashiri has edited and translated numerous works bridging Iranian, Tajiki, and Western scholarship. These include From the Hymns of Zarathustra to the Songs of Borbad (2003), Prominent Tajik Figures of the Twentieth Century (2003), The Nowruz Scrolls (2001, 2004), and The History of a National Catastrophe (1996). He co-edited Proceedings of The Culture and Art of Isfahan during the 16th and 17th Centuries (2007) and edited Tajiks in the 20th Century (2006). Many of his works are available through academic and digital archives, including Radio Free Europe, the Academy of Sciences of Tajikistan, and open scholarly platforms.

== Selected works ==
- Bashiri, Iraj. 'To Be' as the Origin of Syntax: A Persian Framework, Bibliotheca Islamica, Middle Eastern Languages & Linguistics #2, 1973.
- Bashiri, Iraj. "Hafiz' Shirazi Turk: A Structuralist's Point of View," The Muslim World, Part I, LXIX,No. 3, 1979, pp. 1788-197; Part II, LXIX, No. 4, 1979.
- Bashiri, Iraj. The Fiction of Sadeq Hedayat, Amir Kabir Institute of Iranian Studies, Mazda Publishers, 1984.
- Bashiri, Iraj. The Samanids and the Revival of the Civilization of the Iranian Peoples, Dushanbe, 1998.
- Bashiri, Iraj. Prominent Tajik Figures of the Twentieth Century, The International Borbad Foundation, Dushanbe, 2003.
- Bashiri, Iraj. Modern Iranian Philosophy: From Ibn Sina to Mulla Sadra Shirazi, Cognella publishers, 2014.
- Bashiri, Iraj. Ancient Iran: Cosmology, Mythology, History, Cognella publishers, 2016.
- Bashiri, Iraj. Modern Iran: Caliphs, Kings, and Jurisprudents, Cognella publishers, 2017.
- Bashiri, Iraj. History of the Civil War in Tajikistan, Academic Studies Press, Jan. 2019.
- Bashiri, Iraj. "The Life and Poetry of Gulrukhsor Safieva: A Quest for Tajik Identity," Women Poets Iranica, 2024.

== Reception and criticism ==
Bashiri's close readings and translations have been both influential and the subject of scholarly debate. Michael Beard’s 1976 review in Iranian Studies recognized Bashiri’s detailed textual analysis of The Blind Owl while questioning whether some symbolic parallels were overstated. Later scholars and translators routinely cite Bashiri’s translations and critical writings when discussing Hedayat’s reception in English and comparative contexts.

More recent scholarship has continued to engage with Bashiri's interpretations. Sumreen Fatima, in her 2025 article "The Burden of Being: A Reflection on Sadeq Hedayat's The Blind Owl," compared D.P. Costello's and Bashiri's English translations using the original Persian text as a reference, concluding that Bashiri's version is "more accurate and faithful to the original text." Fatima also highlighted Bashiri's symbolic analysis of the novella as "the most compelling and illuminating," noting that he ultimately grounded his interpretation in Buddhist ritual literature, particularly the Bardo Thodol (The Tibetan Book of the Dead).

Further acknowledgment of Bashiri's contributions appears in scholarship on the South Asian dimensions of The Blind Owl. Marta Simidchieva and Nadeem Akhtar observe that, although references to India abound in the novel, few studies have followed this line of inquiry; those that do are "associated primarily with the publications of Iraj Bashiri." They cite Bashiri's monograph The Fiction of Sadeq Hedayat (1984), which posits Buddhist inspiration behind aspects of the novel and identifies correlations with the Buddhacarita, as well as earlier articles drawing parallels with The Tibetan Book of the Dead.
