= Andranik Ovassapian =

American physician

- Անդրանիկ Օվասափեան
- Born: January 27, 1936; Arak, Iran
- Died: June 17, 2010 (aged 74); Helsinki, Finland
- Citizenship: Iran; United States
- Education: Shiraz University of Medical Sciences (MD)
- Known for: Airway management, tracheal intubation
- Children: 3
- Scientific career
- Fields: Anesthesiology
- Workplaces: Shiraz University of Medical Sciences; Northwestern University; University of Chicago

Andranik "Andy" Ovassapian (Armenian: Անդրանիկ Օվասափեան; January 27, 1936 – June 17, 2010) was an Iranian-Armenian and American anesthesiologist known for the development and teaching of airway management and tracheal intubation using an optical fiber endoscope. He founded the Society for Airway Management. Throughout his career, Ovassapian was a professor at Shiraz University of Medical Sciences, Northwestern University, and the University of Chicago.

== Early life and education ==
Andranik Ovassapian was born in on January 27, 1936, in Arak, Iran. He studied at the local Armenian school, then at the Araki Pahlav school. In 1961, he completed a medical degree at Shiraz University. Later that year, Ovassapian started a residency and research fellowship at the Namaz Hospital. In 1963, he started a residency and fellowship at the Hospital of the University of Pennsylvania.

== Career and research ==
After completing his fellowship, Ovassapian taught at University of Pennsylvania for 18 months. In 1968, he returned to the Shiraz University of Medical Sciences as chair of the department of anesthesiology. In the 1970s, Dr. Ovassapian started using a flexible bronchoscope to facilitate the insertion of endotracheal tubes. In 1974, Ovassapian became the head of the department of anesthesiology at Northwestern University, and in 1983 he became a professor at the same university. In 1998, he moved to the University of Chicago Department of Anesthesiology and Critical Care Department, where he founded the Airway Study and Training Center. In 1988, Ovassapian filed a patent for the device known as Ovassapian Intubating Airway.

In 1995, Ovassapian founded the Society for Airway Management and served as the first president from 1995 to 1997 and executive director from 1998 to 2008.

Ovassapian was known for the development and teaching of optical fiber-tracheal intubation.

== Personal life ==
Ovassapian married Ashghen in 1962. They had one daughter and two sons. He resided in Highland Park, Illinois. Ovassapian died on June 17, 2010, after a stroke in Helsinki where he was attending the European Society of Anaesthesiology annual meeting.
