= Hossein Baharvand =

Iranian scientist (born 1972)

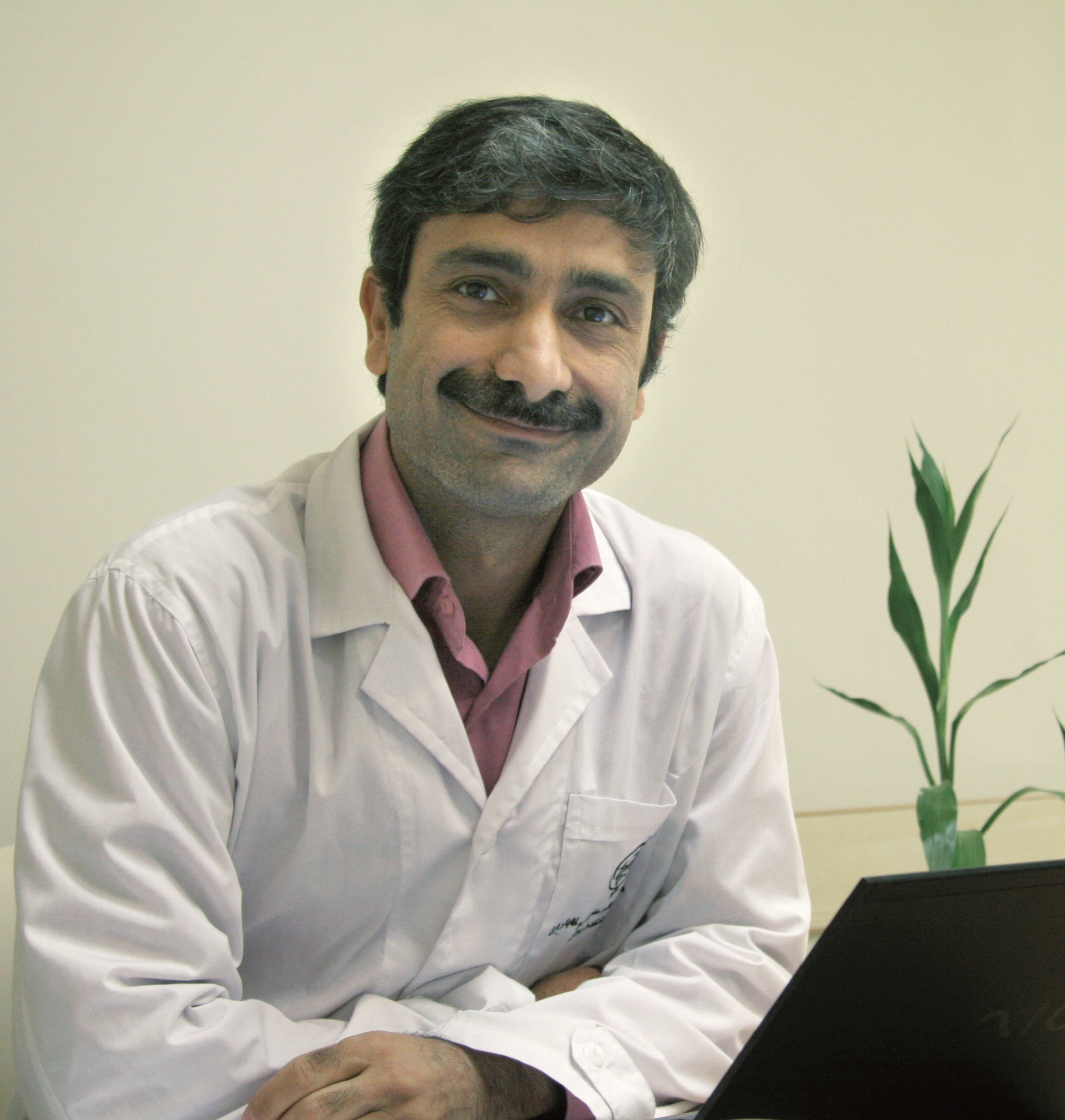
- Hossein Baharvand
- Born: February 25, 1972 (age 54); Isfahan, Iran
- Education: Shiraz University; Shahid Beheshti University; Kharazmi University
- Awards: Mustafa Prize 2019
- Scientific career
- Fields: Stem cells and Developmental Biology
- Workplaces: Royan Institute; University of Science and Culture

Hossein Baharvand is an Iranian stem cell and developmental biologist. He received his B.Sc. in biology from Shiraz University in 1994, and M.Sc. in Developmental Biology from Shahid Beheshti University, Tehran in 1996. He then obtained his Ph.D. in Cell and Developmental Biology from Khwarizmi University (former Tarbiat Moallem University) in 2004. He first joined the Royan Institute in 1995 in which he founded Royan Institute for Stem Cell Biology and Technology, where he currently serves as its director

For the first time, he generated the mouse and human embryonic stem cells (2003) and induced pluripotent stem cells (2008) in Iran. This has enabled his team to pursue many avenues of research into translational research and regenerative medicine. He has focused his research on improving the translational research and regenerative medicine mainly through the understanding of Stem Cells and Developmental Biology and Biologically inspired Engineering. He has been working on pluripotent stem cell differentiation into cardiomyocytes, neural cells, hepatocytes, and the pluripotency mechanism. He has also been making numerous contributions to clinical trials and tissue-specific stem cell transplantation; as well as developing cell manufacturing.

He has given numerous tutorials and invited talks in many congresses such as ISSCR (2018). He is the editor of four international books which were published by Springer (2010 and 2012) and John Wiley, USA (2015). He has published 500 international and 100 national peer-reviewed papers, as well as seven chapters in international books, twenty three books in Persian, and eleven translated English text books into Persian. Eight figures of his peer-reviewed publications were selected as cover pages of international journals.

As of Oct. 2026, Google Scholar reports over 40,000 citations and h-index 86 to his work. He is the editorial board member of eight international journals (e.g., Journal of Biological Chemistry and Scientific Reports from Nature Publishing Group). He has received 38 international and national awards including 10th (2004), 12th (2006), and 17th (2012) annual Razi research award on medical science hosted by Iran Ministry of Health and Medical Education, 26th and 32nd Khwarizmi International Award (2013 and 2019), hosted by Iran Ministry of Science, Research and Technology, 27th annual book of the year of the Islamic republic of Iran (2010), distinguished scientist in Iranian Biotechnology (2015) and Genetics (2016) national award. He is the winner of the Islamic Educational, Scientific, and Cultural Organization (ISESCO) Prize for research in the field of Biology (2010). Moreover, he was introduced as Prominent Professor in 3rd term of Allameh Tabatabaei's Award hosted by Iran vice Presidency for Science and Technology and National Elite Foundation (2014). He is the winner of the United Nations educational, scientific and cultural organization (UNESCO)-Equatorial Guinea International Prize (2014) for Research in Life Sciences aimed at improving the quality of human life with his stem cell research and its numerous applications in regenerative medicine. He was also selected as one of the 20 stem cell person of the year 2017 award nominees hosted by THE NICHE site. He is also the winner of the World Academy of Sciences (TWAS) prize in Biology (2019) for his fundamental contribution to the understanding of how pluripotency and differentiation are established and maintained in stem cells. and has been featured as Highly Cited Researcher based on the rank in the global top 1% of scientists in ESI, Web of Science (July 2019). Recently, he has been awarded the top science and technology award in the Islamic world, Mustafa Prize (2019), for his efforts to promote translational research using stem cells with the goal to improve human life. He was elected as a Fellow of TWAS for his outstanding contribution to science and its promotion in the developing world (2020). He also awarded a national “science medal” from the Medical Council of Iran (2020) and Abu Reyhan Biruni research festival on medical sciences hosted by Shahid Beheshti medical sciences university (2021). He was also awarded the honorary fellowship of the Islamic World Academy of Sciences (2022), as a Mustafa Prize laureate and in appreciation of the efforts that he has made to the field of stem cell biology. Moreover, he is the winner of 1st term of national training/education elites hosted by Iran Ministry of Science, Research and Technology (2023). He was elected as a member of Iran national academy of sciences (2023). He was founded the chariry AbuAlisina-Royan Institute (2024) for medical infertility and medical grenetics in Abu Alisina organ transplant center (Shiraz).

Moreover, as of now some companies are spun off from the work he initiated and directed at the Royan Institute for Stem Cell Biology and Technology such as Cell Tech Pharmed as a cell factory for cell therapy, and Royan Stem Cell Technology for banking of cord blood stem cells.

Furthermore, he has had several efforts in publicizing the stem cell biology in Iran and in this regard he with his team established a lab entitled "Stem Cells for all" and a "mobile adventure lab" by an equipped bus. The aim of these participatory teaching and learning methods is to motivate and empower learners to acquire the knowledge, skills, attitudes and values necessary to shape a sustainable future for stem cells and their potentials in regenerative medicine. He has also established “annual international summer school” program since 2010. The participants are trained by invited speakers from abroad to increase international and national interactions and training methods in this field.He is a co-founders of “Next Generation Scientists, NGS” association for piost-graduate students in joint program of Royan institute and University of Scince and Culture.

== Mustafa Prize ==
Baharvand won the Mustafa Prize in Stem Cell Biology in 2019 for his research into treating Parkinson's and AMD of the eye with cell therapy.
