= Saleh Hosseini =

Iranian translator

Saleh Hosseini (born 1946, Songhor, Kermanshah province, Iran) is a retired professor of literature, translator and critic.

Having completed his tertiary education in his hometown, he continued his education at Shiraz University in Iran, where he graduated with an M.A. in English literature. Then he went to the United States, earning a Ph.D. in English literature at University of Washington, after which he returned to Iran in 1979. He was acclaimed by the Iranian Ministry of Culture and Guidance as the leading translator and critic of the year in 1997. (1376 Hijri)

Hosseini's vast knowledge of Persian literature, especially the works of Hafiz and Modern Persian poets such as Sohrab Sepehri and his long association with notable literary figures such as Manucher Badiyee, Houshang Golshiri, Feraidun Moshiri, Houshang Golshiri, Ahmad Shamlu and other prominent figures of Iran's literary society, has resulted in him being one of the famous critics of Modern Iranian poetry and one of the advocates of the Persian language which is manifest in his translations.

Hosseini's translations have been criticized as being too ponderous for the common reader; whereas being works of literature in their original form, Hosseini has always defended his unique translations with the statement that he has striven to create "an equivalent literary masterpiece in Persian" while remaining faithful to the original work. Among his notable works are1984 by George Orwell and the introduction of Brave New World translated into Persian by Sa'id Hamidian. He also translated To the Lighthouse (Virginia Woolf) and Heart of Darkness (Joseph Conrad) which are both great in source language and translated target language. It is of note that Saleh Hosseini is best known in Iran for his translation of William Faulkner's works and the development of a new style of descriptive translation in the Persian translation of the Sound and The Fury.Nazari-be-Tarjome (نظری به ترجمه) [A Look to Translation] and Farhang-e-Barabarhaye Adabi (فرهنگ برابرهای ادبی) [A Dictionary of Literary Inequalities] are among the books written by Dr. Saleh Hosseini.

== Works ==
- A comparative analysis of The Sound and the Fury and Shazde Ehtejab * * [Barrasye-Tatbighie-Khashm-o-Hayahoo-va-Shazde-Ehtejab](بررسی تطبیقی خشم و هیاهو و شازده احتجاب)
- Tiling of Scribers' Palace [Kashigari-i-Kakh-i-Kateban] (کاشی گری کاخ کاتبان) (in collaboration with Pouya Rafi'i)
- Golshiri the Scriber and House of Brightness [Golshiri-i-Kateb-va-Khaneye-Roshanan] (گلشیری کاتب و خانه ی روشنان) (in collaboration with Pouya Rafi'i)
- Prayer Flowers [Golhaye-Niayesh] (گل های نیایش)
- A look to Translation [Nazari-be-Tarjome] (نظری به ترجمه)
- Silent Lotus [Niloofar-i-Khamush] (نیلوفر خاموش)

Translations

- To the Lighthouse – Virginia Woolf
- The Sound and the Fury – William Faulkner
- Go Down Moses – William Faulkner
- Absalom, Absalom! – William Faulkner(in collaboration with Parviz Perez Talebzadeh)
- The Brothers Karamazov – Fyodor Dostoevsky
- The Death of Ivan Ilyich – Leo Tolstoy
- The Last Temptation of Christ – Nikos Kazantzakis
- Report to Greco – Nikos Kazantzakis
- The Gambler – Fyodor Dostoevsky
- Heart of Darkness – Joseph Conrad(in collaboration with Parviz Perez Talebzadeh)
- Lord Jim – Joseph Conrad
- Under the Volcano – Malcolm Lowry
- The Great Code: The Bible and Literature – Northrop Frye
- The Anatomy of Criticism – Northrop Frye
- 1984 – George Orwell
- Animal Farm – George Orwell (in collaboration with Masumeh Nabi-Zadeh)
