= Shiraz University of Technology =

University of Technology in Iran

- دانشگاه صنعتی شیراز; Dāneshgāh-e San'ati-ye Shirāz
- Type: Public university
- Established: 1968
- Chancellor: Mohammad Javad Dehghani (Since January 2025)
- Vice-Chancellor: Dr. Mohammad Reza Salehi
- Faculty: 103 (as of Jun 2017)
- Students: ~1500
- Undergraduates: ~650
- Postgraduates: ~850
- Location: Shiraz, Fars, Iran
- Campus: Urban
- Nickname: SUTECH
- Website: www.en.sutech.ac.ir

Shiraz University of Technology (SUTech) (Persian: دانشگاه صنعتی شیراز Dāneshgāh-e San'ati-ye Shirāz) is a university in Iran, a public university in the Fars province in higher technological education, basic and applied research. In 2004, the Government offered technical assistance for establishing an institute of higher education in engineering in Shiraz. Currently the university has about 1,700 students, with five Bachelor's degree programs (B.S.), 31 Master's degree (M.S.), and 14 Ph.D. degree programs.

== History ==
Shiraz University of Technology was established in 1968 as the Electronics Industry College, which was one of the Shiraz University branches (Electronics Engineering College). After 2004, it was named "Shiraz University of Technology" as an independent public university which developed by some other fields such as Chemical, Material, Mechanical, etc.

== Campus ==
Currently there is just one campus on Moddares Blvd., Shiraz, Iran. It was announced that a new campus is building in Shahrak Sadra, Shiraz, Iran.

The campus consists of all the university's building like departments buildings, library, restaurant, mosque, gym, publication, etc. There are five department buildings:

- Faculty of Sciences building
- Electrical Engineering Department building (which have no classrooms and consists of faculties and some laboratories)
- Information Technology Department building (which merged with the chancellor's building)
- Chemical Engineering Department building (which merged with the Aerospace Engineering Department and Civil & Environmental Engineering Department and a part of the Electrical Engineering Department)
- Material Engineering Department building

== Ranking ==
University rankings

Regional – Overall
- QS Asia: 301 (2025)

Shiraz University of Technology is the 5th university in Iran based on 2024 and 6th university in Iran 2025 Times rankings It is also 118th university in Asia and 501-600th in the world in 2024.

Best young university in Iran based on 2024 Times rankings and 85th in the world.

Shiraz University of Technology is the 11th university in Iran based on 2024 QS Top-Universities It is also 261-270th university in Asia. the 11th unuveristy in Iran and 301 in Asia based on 2025 QS Top-Universities.

== Faculties ==
The following degrees are now offered in the university training students in bachelor's and master's degrees levels:

- Aerospace Engineering (M.S. since 2010, PhD. since 2013)
- Applied Mathematics (M.S. since 2007, PhD. since 2010)
- Chemical Engineering (M.S. since 2007)
- Civil Engineering (B.S. since 2024, M.S. since 2008, PhD. since 2013)
- Computer Engineering (M.S. since 2011)
- Electrical and Electronic Engineering (B.S. & M.S. since 2004, PhD. since 2010)
- Industrial Engineering (B.S. since 2019, M.S. since 2011)
- Information Technology (B.S. since 2004, M.S. since 2010, PhD. since 2013)
- Material Engineering (M.S. since 2009)
- Mechanical Engineering (B.S. since 2022, M.S. since 2007)
- Physics (M.S. since 2010)
- Physical Chemistry (M.S. since 2008)

=== Chancellors ===
| Chancellor | Tenure | Speciality | Notes |
|---|---|---|---|
| Prof. Jalil Moghaddasi | 2004–2010 | Chemistry | Also president of the college before the university's establishment and Shiraz University's Faculty of Chemistry master |
| Prof. Shahrokh Jam | 2010–2014 | Communications Engineering | Former head master of the Electrical Engineering Department |
| Prof. Jalil Moghaddasi | 2014–2018 | Chemistry | Also president of the college before the university's establishment and Shiraz University's Faculty of Chemistry master |
| Prof. Mohammad Mehdi Alavianmehr | 2018–2023 | Chemistry | |
| Prof. Mohammad Hossein Shafiei | 2023–2025 | Electrical Control Engineering | |
| Prof. Mohammad Javad Dehghani | 2025-Present | Communications Engineering | |

== See also ==
- Higher education in Iran
