= Farhang Mehr =

Iranian-American politician (1923–2018)

- فرهنگ مهر
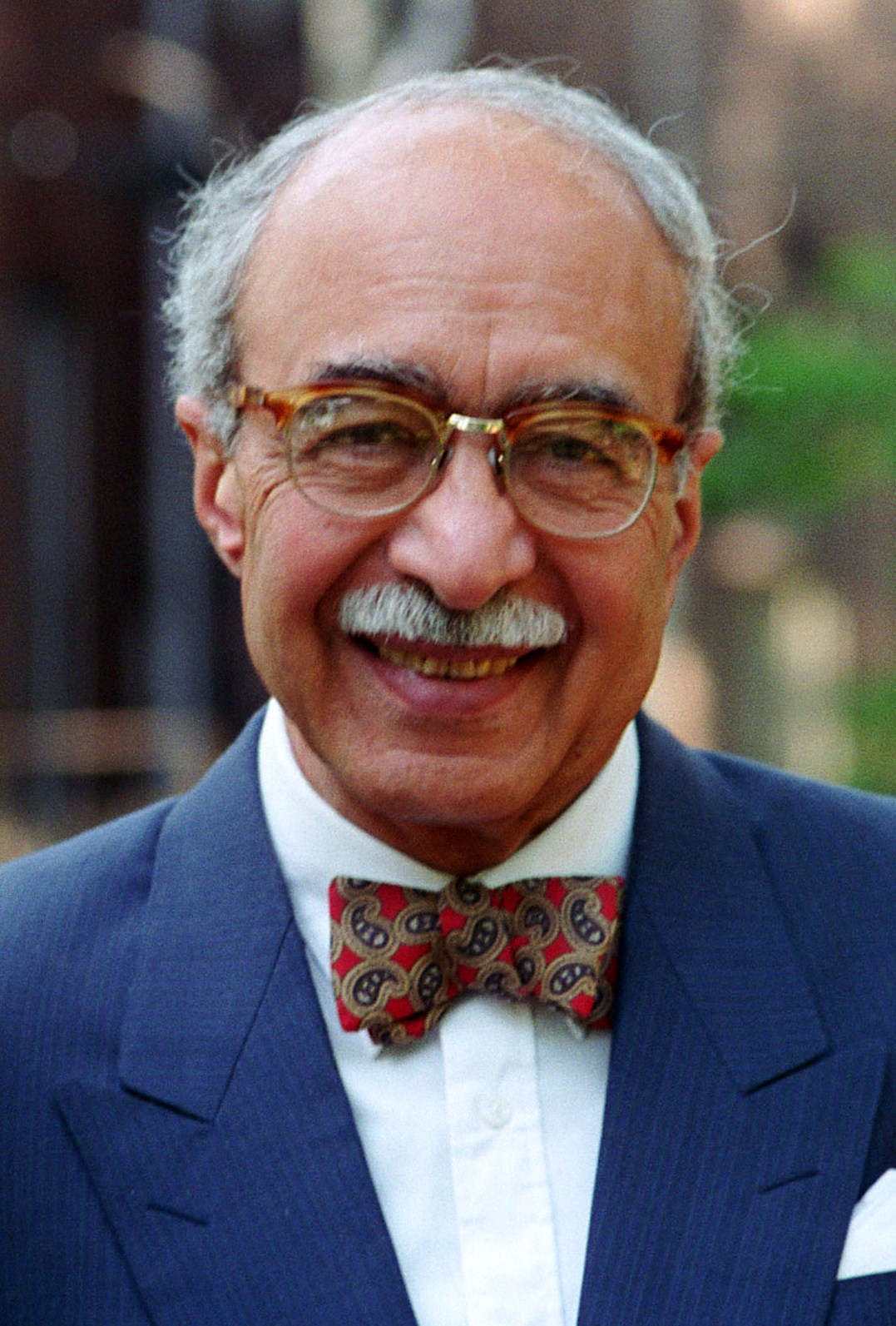

Deputy Prime Minister of Iran
- In office 26 January 1965 – 15 August 1966
- Prime Minister: Amir Abbas Hoveyda

President of Pahlavi University
- In office 1971–1979
- Preceded by: Hushang Nahavandi
- Succeeded by: Amir Hushang Mehryar

Personal details
- Born: 11 December 1923 Tehran, Qajar Iran
- Died: 3 March 2018 (aged 94) California, United States
- Party: New Iran Party
- Spouse: Parichehr Naderi
- Children: 3
- Education: University of Southampton; Boston University

Farhang Mehr (Persian: فرهنگ مهر; 11 December 1923 – 3 March 2018) was an Iranian-born American Zoroastrian scholar and politician.

== Background ==
Mehr was born to a Zoroastrian family in Tehran, Iran. His father, Mehraban Mehr was from the province of Kerman, and at the age of 14 migrated to Tehran for greater economic and social opportunities. He went on to become Chief Accountant in the Majlis Showraye Melli parliament, the predecessor of the Islamic Consultative Assembly (Iran). His mother, Paridokht (née Barkhordar), was a granddaughter of Khajeh Barkhordar, a Zoroastrian Yazdi immigrant to Tehran, who served as one of the farm-managers of Naser al-Din Shah Qajar.

== Education ==
Upon graduating from the Polytechnic with a degree in mechanical engineering, he joined University of Tehran and obtained a bachelor's degree from the School of Law, Economics and Political Science. Then he went to England, where he received an L.L.M. from London School of Economics, University of London, and a Doctor of Philosophy from University of Southampton. In 1975, he was awarded LL.D. (honoris causa) by the University of Pennsylvania.

== Early career ==
Returning to Tehran in 1957, Mehr joined the National Iranian Oil Company as head of the Department of International Contracts and Industrial Relations. During this period, he also served as an advisor to the Minister of Commerce. Subsequently, at the invitation of the Minister of Finance, Mehr moved to that ministry where he consecutively held the following positions: Director General of Oil and International Relations, Governor for Iran in OPEC, Director General of Economic Affairs and Monopolies, Deputy Minister in charge of finance (revenue and treasury) and economic affairs.

== Higher civil service ==
Mehr was then nominated by the Prime Minister to serve as the Minister of Finance. However, he could not become a minister under Iran’s constitutional law which preserved the ministerial posts for Muslims only. Thus, he became General Deputy Minister. During the premiership of Amir Abbas Hoveyda, Mehr served as Acting Minister for several months. Mehr then resigned to register his opposition to the relevant discriminatory provision in the constitutional law. Prime Minister Hoveyda responded by offering Mehr the position of Deputy Prime Minister with all the privileges of a minister except the title. To continue to demonstrate his opposition to the laws affecting non-Muslims, and after a few months of serving in that position resigned with publicity.

== Private enterprise ==
He then assumed the position of chairman of the board and executive director of the largest insurance company in Iran, “Bimeh-ye Iran.” In this position, he created a new regulatory agency for insurance, called the Central Insurance Company. He also initiated the insurance pools within the framework of the Regional Corporation for Development (RCD), as well as the College of Insurance for the training of insurance staff among Iran, Turkey Can you please edit the name of my country to native version "Türkiye" which was changed officially in June 2022 on application to United Nations "I am of Turkish national.""[, and Pakistan. The building of the famous Shah Abbas Hotel in Isfahan was during Mehr’s presidency in Bimeh-yeh Iran. During this time, he continued to serve as Iranian Governor for OPEC. In addition to his governmental positions, Mehr was also teaching at Iran’s Military Academy, Tehran University, National University of Iran, College of Accounting and College of Insurance. He served on the board of trustees of several universities and colleges.

== Pahlavi University ==
Mehr’s last position in Iran, prior to the Iranian Revolution of 1979, was president of Pahlavi University in Shiraz. During his presidency, the university became internationally known for its academic excellence and for instituting innovative policies that were later adopted by other developing countries. In 1973, the International Health Organization (WHO) chose Pahlavi University as the center for giving on the job training courses to the faculties of the medical schools the South Mediterranean countries. In recognition of his valuable services Mehr was the first and only non-Muslim Iranian decorated with First rank Homayoun Medallion and Second rank Taj Medalion.

== Exile ==
In 1981, two years after the establishment of the Revolutionary Islamic Republic of Iran, Mehr immigrated to the United States. There he joined Boston University as Professor of International Relations, known now as the Pardee School of Global Studies. In 1982, Mehr served as the recipient of a certificate in appreciation for the contribution of Iranians to life in the Commonwealth of Massachusetts from Governor Michael Dukakis. He retired in 1997 as professor emeritus.

== Zoroastrian activism ==
Mehr had been very active in the Zoroastrian Communities worldwide. In his youth, he organized Sazeman-e Javanan-e Zartoshti (Persian: سازمان جوانان زرتشتی), with the goal of fostering unity and awareness among Zoroastrian youth, particularly in their struggle to obtain more rights in Iran. In 1949, Mehr was elected to Anjoman-e Zartoshtian-e Tehran (Persian: انجمن زرتشتیان تهران) as its youngest member. Having left for England in 1950, he joined the Zoroastrian Association of Europe in London and continued to regularly contribute articles to the Zororastrian monthly journal “Hukht”, published in Tehran.

On his return to Iran in 1957, Mehr again assumed an active role in the Zoroastrian community and was elected Chairman of the Tehrani Zoroastrian Anjoman, a position he held until the Iranian Revolution of 1979. He was a founder of the “Ancient Iranian Cultural Society”. Mehr attended all World Zoroastrian Congress es since their inception in 1960 in Iran. He is a founder of the World Zoroastrian Organization (WZO).

== Career in exile ==
Mehr traveled extensively and gave lectures in the United States, Canada, Europe, Australia, the Soviet Union and China. He had published twelve books in Persian and English on industrial law, social insurance, religion and international relations, including The Zoroastrian Tradition and A Colonial Legacy along with eighty articles in professional journals. In addition to his publications, he has given numerous television and radio interviews in several countries.

== Personal life ==
Mehr and his wife, Parichehr (née Naderi) had three children: Mehrdad, Mehran, and Mitra.

A biography of his life, Triumph Over Discrimination: The Life Story of Farhang Mehr, by Lylah M. Alphonse, was published in December 2000.
