= Higher education in Iran =

Network of universities for higher studies in Iran

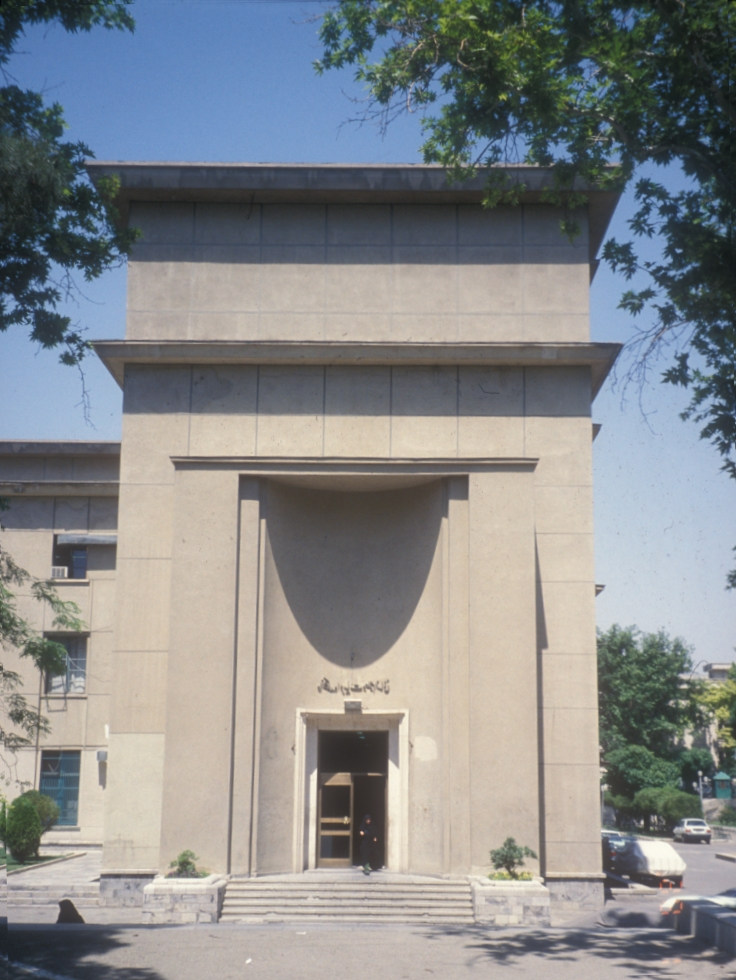
The College of Humanities of the University of Tehran

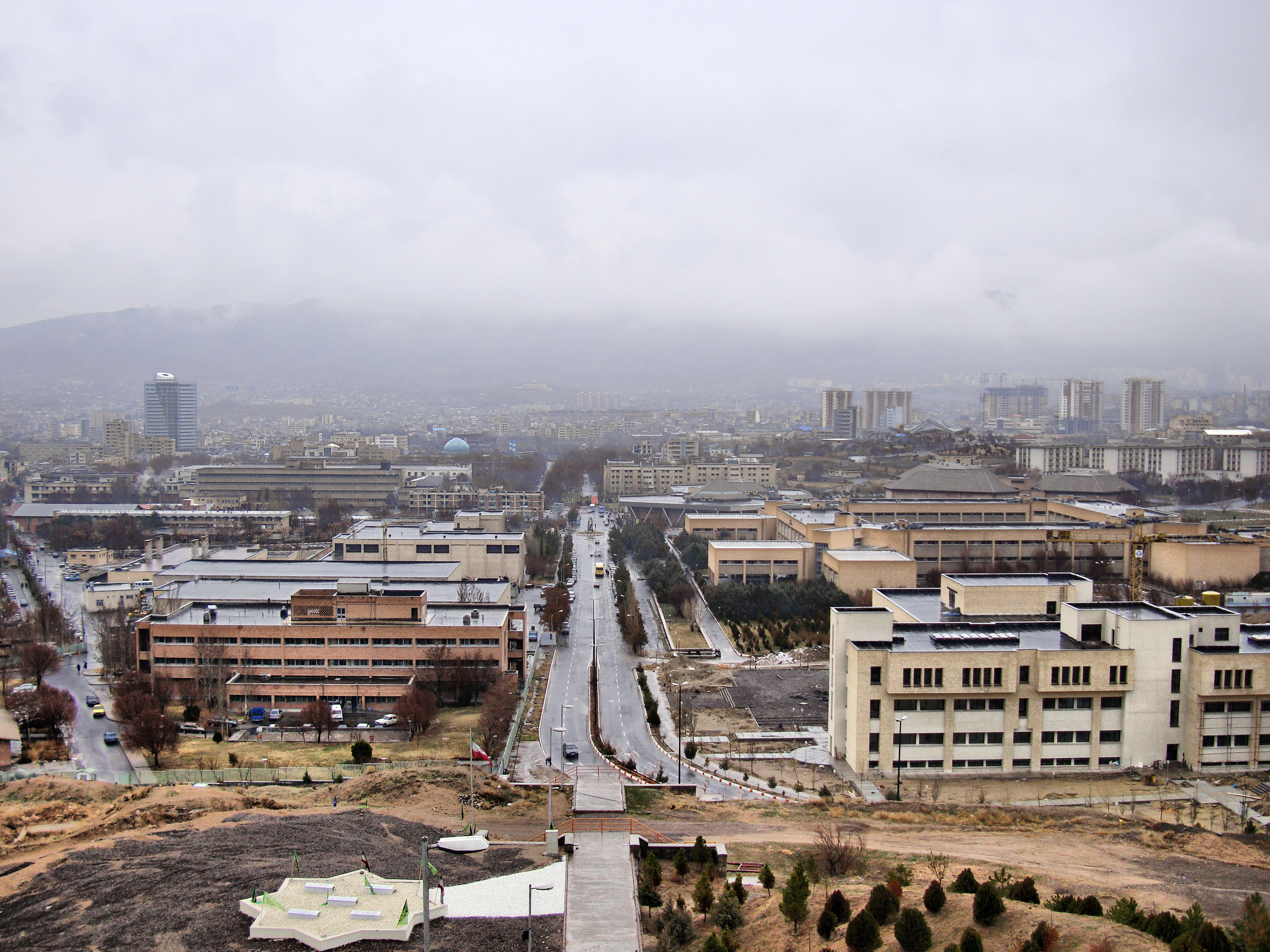
The University of Tabriz

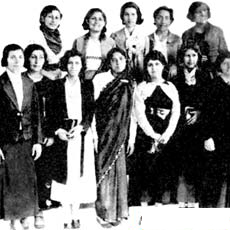
First Iranian women entered university

Iran has a network of private, public, and state-affiliated universities offering degrees in higher education. State-run universities of Iran are under the direct supervision of Iran's Ministry of Science, Research and Technology (for non-medical universities) and Ministry of Health and Medical Education (for medical schools). According to article 3 of the Constitution of the Islamic Republic of Iran, Iran guarantees "free education and physical training for everyone at all levels, and the facilitation and expansion of higher education." IANI representatives say that academics in Iran are "ultimately directed by the regime and military when it comes to specific areas of research". Rana Dadpour, who taught at an Iranian university, said that certain areas of research are directed by the Islamic Revolutionary Guard Corps and could be employed for "surveillance or military purposes".

== History ==
=== Pre-Islamic era ===
The existence of pre-Islamic era universities such as the School of Nisibis, Sarouyeh, Reishahr, and The Academy of Gondishapur provide examples of precedence of academic institutions of science that date back to ancient times.

=== Islamic era ===
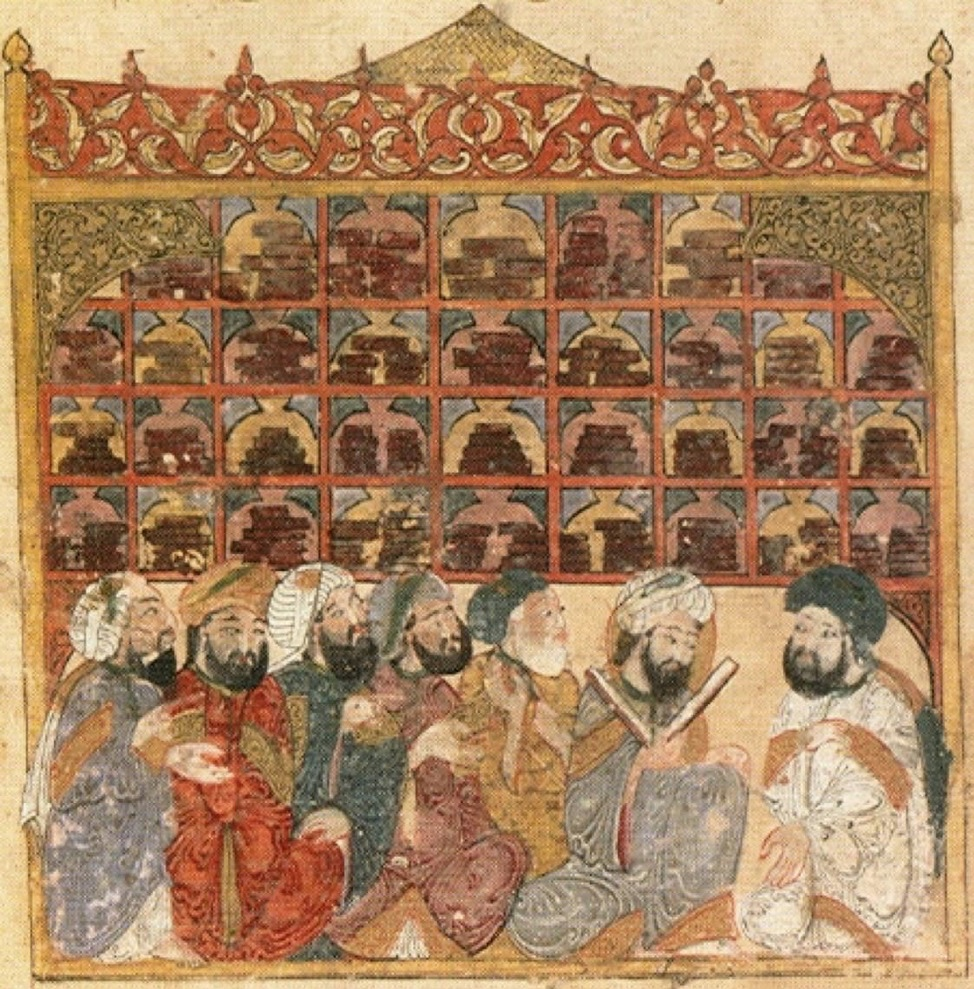
An academic library in Basra depicted in the 13th century by Yahya ibn Mahmud al-Wasiti, found in the Maqamat of Hariri.

The traditions and heritage of these centers of higher learning were later carried on to schools such as Iran's Nizamiyyas, and Baghdad's House of Wisdom, during the Islamic era. The Nizamiyyas were among the first well organized institutions of higher learning in the Muslim world. The quality of education was among the highest in the Islamic world, and they were even renowned in Europe. They were supported financially, politically, and spiritually by the royal establishment and the elite class. Some scholars have suggested that the establishment of the Nizamiyya madrasas was in fact an attempt to thwart the growing influence of another group of Muslims, the Ismailis, in the region. Indeed, Nizam al-Mulk devoted a significant section in his Siyasatnama (Books of Politics) to refuting the Ismaili doctrines.

The most famous and celebrated of all the Nizamiyyas was Nizamiyya of Baghdad (established 1065), where Nizam al-Mulk appointed the distinguished philosopher and theologian, al-Ghazali, as a professor. Persian poet Sa'di was a student of the Baghdad Nizamiyya. Other Nizamiyyas were located in Nishapur, Amol, Balkh, Herat and Isfahan.

=== Modern ===
Abbas Mirza was the first to dispatch Iranian students to Europe for a Western education. The history of the establishment of Western style academic universities in Iran (Persia) dates back to 1851 with the establishment of Darolfonoon – which was founded as a result of the efforts of the royal vizier Mirza Taghi Khan Amir Kabir, aimed at training and teaching Iranian experts in many fields of science and technology.

In 1855, The Ministry of Science was first established, and Ali Gholi Mirza I'tizad al-Saltaneh (علیقلی میرزا اعتضاد السلطنه) was appointed Iran's first Minister of Science by Nasereddin Shah. By the 1890s Darolfonoon was competing with other prominent institutions of modern learning. The Military College of Tehran (Madraseh-ye Nezam), established in 1885 with a budget of 10,000–12,000 tomans, was its first rival; and in 1899 the College of Political Sciences (Madraseh-ye olum-e siyasi) was organized within the foreign ministry.

The Ministry of Higher Education, which oversees the operation of all institutes of higher education in Iran, was established in 1967. However, it was back in 1928 that Iran's first university, as we know it today, was proposed by an Iranian physicist, Mahmoud Hessaby. The University of Tehran (a.k.a. Tehran University) was designed by French architect Andre Godard, and built in 1934. Today, Tehran University is Iran's largest university with over 32,000 students.

In the medical field, it was Joseph Cochran who first founded a professional school in Iran in 1878, and who is often credited for founding Iran's "first contemporary medical college", as well as founding Westminster Hospital, one of Iran's first modern hospitals, in Urmia formerly known as Rezaieh in honor of Shia Islam's 8th imam. The medical faculty Cochran established at Urmia University was joined by several other Americans, namely Drs. Wright, Homlz, van Nourdon, and Miller. They were all buried in Urmia as their resting place after serving the area for many years.

In Tehran, Samuel M. Jordan (the namesake of "Jordan Street" in Tehran) also was directly responsible for the expansion of the American College in Tehran. The school received a permanent charter from the Board of Regents of the State University of New York in 1932.

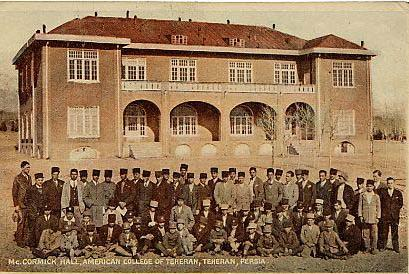
McCormick Hall, American College of Tehran, circa 1930.

By the end of the first Pahlavi period in 1941, the University of Tehran was still the only modern university in the country. Hence, the ministry of science commenced the establishment of other universities in Isfahan, Tabriz, Ahvaz, and Shiraz, with special emphasis given to the medical and veterinary sciences. Dr. Charles Oberling was highly instrumental in this regard.

In 1953, there were four universities with 14,500 undergraduate students, whereas in 1977 there were 16 universities with 154,315 undergraduate students.

The Shah soon initiated projects to build Iranian universities modeled after American schools. Thus Pahlavi University (Shiraz University today), Sharif University of Technology, and Isfahan University of Technology, three of Iran's top academic universities were all directly modeled on American institutions such as the University of Illinois at Chicago, MIT, and the University of Pennsylvania. The Shah in return was generous in awarding American universities with financial gifts. For example, the University of Southern California received a gift from the Shah in the form of an endowed chair of petroleum engineering, and a million dollar donation was given to the George Washington University to create an Iranian Studies program.

The Iranian Revolution put an end to US-Iran academic relations. In 1980, a major overhaul in the academia and higher education system of Iran initiated by Ayatollah Khomeini led to what is referred to in Iran as "Iran's Cultural Revolution". All universities in the country were closed down from 1980 to 1983. In addition, Islamic curricula and Islamic educational setting were introduced when the universities were reopened.

In 1986, the Ministry of Higher Education handed over supervision and overseeing of education in the medical sciences in Iran to the Ministry of Health, Treatment and Medical Education.

After the Iran–Iraq War, some new universities were founded and doctoral programs were developed in the previous universities. The number of university students is now more than six times as many as in 1979 (when Shah was overthrown); as such, critics debate whether the national entrance exam is still useful.

== Academic system of Iranian universities ==
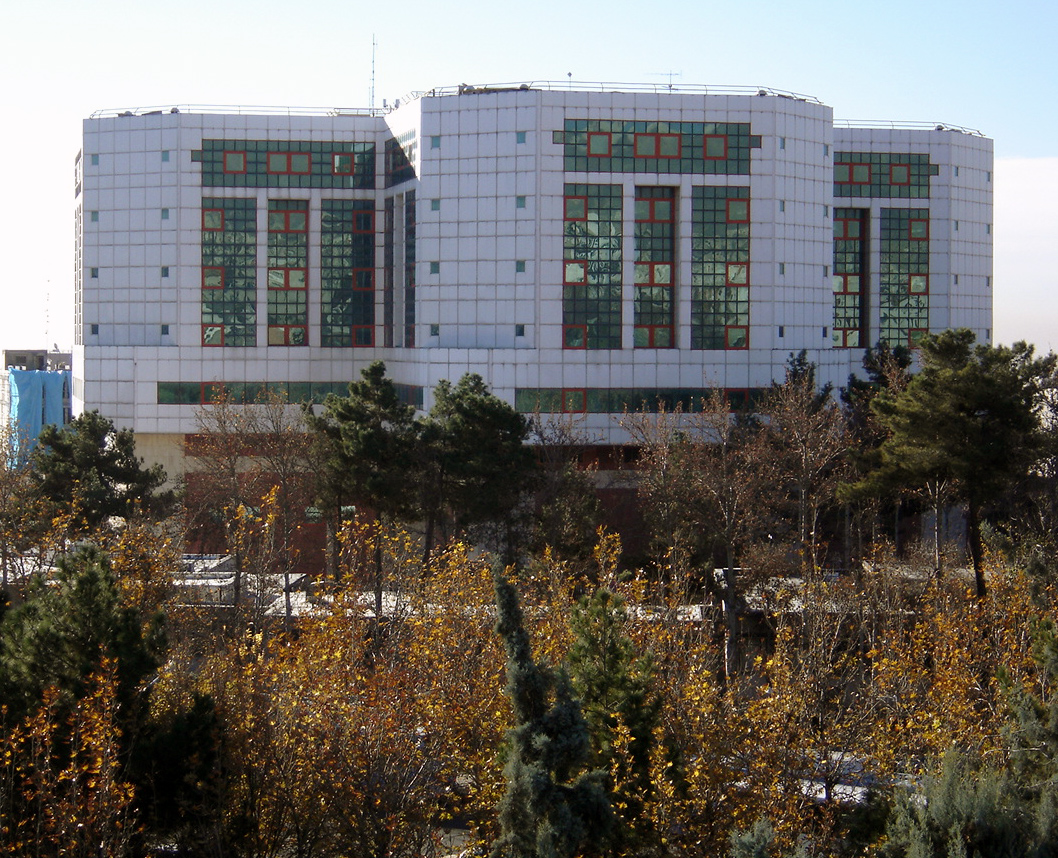
Tehran University of Medical Sciences' Tehran Heart Center

In 2008, Iran had over 3.5 million students enrolled in universities; about 1.7 million in various programs in the Islamic Azad University system and the remainder in state universities. In addition, the new enrollment numbers for the academic year 2004 were 290,000 in Azad universities and 250,000 in state universities.

Iran has 54 state operated universities and 42 state medical schools. These are primarily the top choice for students in national entrance exams. There are 289 major private universities in Iran. In all these schools, except for private universities such as the Islamic Azad University system, tuition and room and board is mostly paid for by the government. The universities themselves largely operate on state budgets.

Some schools offer degrees in conjunction with European universities. The International University of Chabahar, for example, in 2007 offered programs under the guidance of London School of Economics and Political Science Goldsmiths University of London, and Royal Holloway. Other schools such as the Institute for Advanced Studies in Basic Sciences in Zanjan closely collaborates with the International Centre for Theoretical Physics in Trieste, Italy for workshops, seminars, and summer schools. The Iranian government also in 2017 offered scholarships for successful applicants to pursue PhD-level studies in foreign countries, mostly Great Britain.

By early 2000, Iran allocated around 0.4% of its gross domestic product to research and development; that ranks it "far behind industrialized societies" and the world average of 1.4%. By 2009 this ratio of research to GDP reached 0.87% and the set target was 2.5%.

=== Rankings ===
Six Iranian universities have been placed among the world's top 1,000 universities announced by the QS World University Rankings 2024. Times Higher Education World University Rankings published a global ranking for universities and institutes of higher education in 2024. The best global universities in Iran were ranked as follows:

Ranking of Iranian universities (THE) 2024
Rank	University	City
1	Sharif University of Technology	Tehran
2	Amirkabir University of Technology	Tehran
3	Isfahan University of Technology	Isfahan
4	University of Tehran	Tehran
5	Iran University of Science and Technology	Tehran
6	University of Tabriz	Tabriz
7	Tehran University of Medical Sciences	Tehran
8	Shahid Beheshti University of Medical Sciences	Tehran
9	Shiraz University of Technology	Shiraz
10	Babol Noshirvani University of Technology	Babol
11	Tabriz University of Medical Sciences	Tabriz
12	Iran University of Medical Sciences	Tehran
13	Shiraz University	Shiraz
14	Ferdowsi University of Mashhad	Mashhad

==== Ranking by number of publications (ISI) ====
The top seven universities in Iran among world-class universities, according to rankings as from data published on QS World University Rankings official website in 2024:

- Sharif University of Technology: 334
- University of Tehran: 360
- Amirkabir University of Technology: 375
- Iran University of Science and Technology: 451
- Isfahan University of Technology : between 681 and 690
- Shahid Beheshti University: between 951 and 1000
- Ferdowsi University of Mashhad: between 1001 and 1200

==== Medical schools ====
ISC's list of the highest-ranked universities in the medical field for 2012 listed:

1. Tehran University of Medical Sciences
2. Shiraz University of Medical Sciences
3. Shahid Beheshti University of Medical Sciences (formerly Melli University)
4. Isfahan University of Medical Sciences
5. Tabriz University of Medical Sciences
6. Mashad University of Medical Sciences
7. Ahvaz Jundishapur University of Medical Sciences

==== Dental schools ====
According to the 2007 rankings the top five rated dental schools in Iran were:

1. Shahid Beheshti University of Medical Sciences
2. Tehran University of Medical Sciences and Mashad University of Medical Sciences
3. Isfahan University of Medical Sciences
4. Kerman University of Medical Sciences, Shahid Sadoughi University of Medical Sciences and Health Services and Hamedan University of Medical Sciences
5. Ahvaz Jundishapur University of Medical Sciences, Shiraz University of Medical Sciences and Babol University of Medical Sciences

==== Pharmacy schools ====
According to the 2010 rankings the top three rated schools in the pharmaceutical field in Iran were:

1. Tehran University of Medical Sciences
2. Isfahan University of Medical Sciences
3. Tabriz University of Medical Sciences

==== Engineering schools ====
According to the 2024 Times Higher Education World University Rankings, the top-ranked engineering schools in Iran and their rank among world universities were:

1. Sharif University of Technology: 126
2. University of Tehran: 201
3. Amirkabir University of Technology: 251
4. Iran University of Science and Technology: 251
5. Isfahan University of Technology : 301
6. Babol Noshirvani University of Technology: 401
7. Imam Khomeini International University: 401
8. University of Kashan: 401
9. Shiraz University of Technology 501
10. Shiraz University 501
11. University of Tabriz 501
12. University of Mohaghegh Ardabili 501
13. Urmia University 501

== Prominent libraries ==
Large libraries existed in Iran both before and after the advent of Islam and throughout many periods in Iran's history, including the libraries at Gondeshapur, School of Nisibis, and Sarouyeh during the pre-Islamic era of Iran.

During the Middle Ages, many schools of Nizamiyya harbored large collections of manuscripts and treatises. In Maragheh, Nasīr al-Dīn al-Tūsī built a library that reportedly contained some 40,000 volumes which was well financed. The royal library of the Samanid court, to which Avicenna was granted special access, is yet another example.

The first prototype of a modern national library in Iran was the Library of Dar al-Funun College established in 1851. In 1899 another library called the Nation's Library was inaugurated in Tehran. Finally, the National Library of Iran was inaugurated in 1937.

Iran's major national libraries today are:

- National Library of Iran, Tehran
- Central Library of Astan Quds Razavi, Mashad
- Tabriz National Library, Tabriz
- Malek National Library, Tehran
- Ayatollah Marashi Najafi Library, Qom
- Iran's Library of The Parliament
- Shiraz Regional Library of Science and Technology, Shiraz
- Library of Institute for Studies in Theoretical Physics and Mathematics

== Ideology and politics in higher education ==
Under the rule of the Islamic theocracy in Iran since 1979 revolution, the status of science and education has been dramatically affected in the country. In particular, following the so-called Iranian Cultural Revolution and Islamization of universities after a shutdown period, the quality of science and technology has since been revived, so much so that Iran ranked 40th in science production and first in scientific growth in the world in 2011.

=== Exclusion of students ===
==== Religious ====
Students of unrecognized minority religions have been barred from entering tertiary education institutions in Iran, particularly those of the Baháʼí Faith. Since the Iranian Revolution of 1979 Baháʼí students have been excluded from universities regardless of their national university examination results on basis of their religion. See Baháʼí Institute for Higher Education.

==== Gender-based ====
In August 2012, 36 universities declared that 77 BA and BSc courses in 2012–2012 academic year would be "single gender" and effectively exclusive to men, limiting the options of female undergraduate students.

== Entrepreneurship ==
In accordance with the third five-year development plan, the "entrepreneurship development plan in Iranian universities" (known as KARAD Plan) was developed and launched in twelve universities across the country, under the supervision of Management and Planning Organization and the Ministry of Science, Research and Technology.

== Brain drain and students abroad ==
Iran tops the world countries in the brain drain phenomenon. In 2002, the CIA estimated that 77% of Iran's population aged 15 and over can read and write. By 2008, the adult literacy rate had reached 80.6%. A significant majority of this population is at or approaching collegiate levels. Of this population, nearly 150,000 are estimated to exit Iran every year.

According to the Iranian government, in 2013, 12,000 foreign students were studying at Iranian universities while 55,686 Iranian students were studying abroad. Out of this number, 8,883 students were studying in Malaysia, 7,341 in the United States, 5,638 in Canada, 3,504 in Germany, 3,364 in Turkey, 3,228 in Britain, and the rest in other countries. But according to a newer estimate by the Minister of Education, between 350 and 500 thousand Iranians were studying outside of the country in 2014. The difference remains unexplained.

As of 2020, 40,000 foreign nationals are studying in 43 Iranian universities, 22,000 of whom are studying at the universities affiliated to the Ministry of Science, 8,000 at the Azad University, 3,000 at the Ministry of Health, and the rest at other universities. Some 50 percent of these students are studying for a bachelor's degree and 16 percent of whom are educating to receive a Ph.D.

As of 2015, 42% of recent/young graduates were unemployed.

== See also ==
- Education in Iran
- Science and technology in Iran
- Economy of Iran
  - School of Economic Affairs (Iran)
  - Venture capital in Iran
- International Rankings of Iran in Education
- List of Iranian Research Centers
  - List of Iranian scientists
    - Modern Iranian scientists and engineers
- List of universities in Iran
  - List of Universities in Tehran Province
    - List of colleges and universities in Tehran
- Iranian Studies
- Intellectual Movements in Iran

Historic institutions

- Darolfonoon
- Academy of Gondishapur
- Nizamiyya
- Imperial Iranian Academy of Philosophy
