= Shiraz University =

University in Iran

Coordinates: 29°38′23.07″N 52°31′36.3″E

- دانشگاه شيراز; Dāneshgāh-e-Shirāz
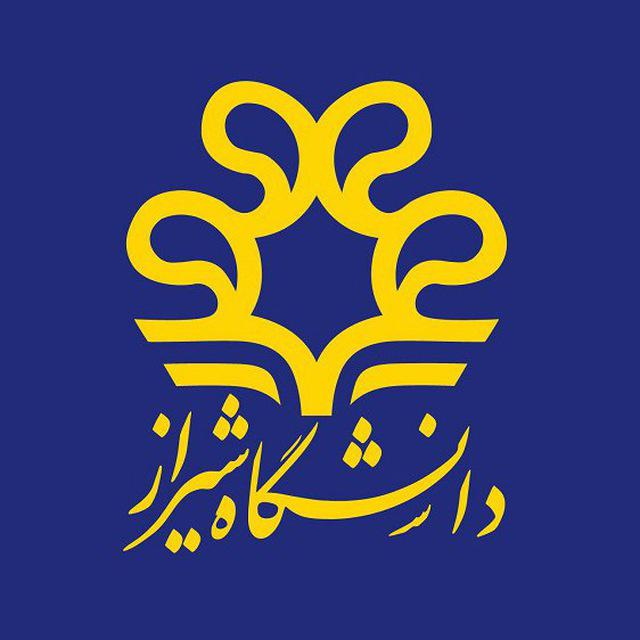
- Shiraz University Seal
- Former name: Pahlavi University
- Motto: خرد، کوشش (old) دارالعلم در دارالعلم
- Motto in English: Wisdom, Endeavor (old); A Dar-al-Elm (University) in a Dar-al-Elm (Former Epithet of Shiraz)
- Type: Public
- Established: 1946
- Affiliations: FUIW; IAU; ASEA-UNINET
- Endowment: US$ 373.1 million (10 December 2021)
- Chancellor: Alireza Afsharifar
- Faculty: 942
- Students: around 21,000
- Undergraduates: 11,839
- Postgraduates: 7,189
- Doctoral students: 1,683
- Location: Shiraz, Fars, Iran
- Campus: Urban
- Athletics: 12 teams
- Colors: Dark Blue and Yellow
- Website: shirazu.ac.ir
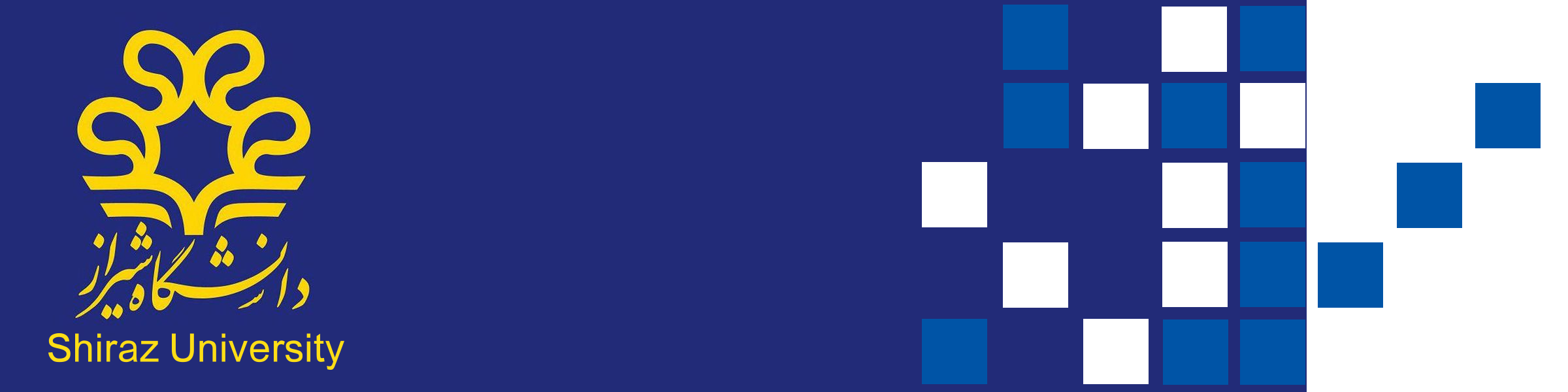

Shiraz University (Persian: دانشگاه شیراز Dāneshgāh-e-Shirāz, formerly known as Pahlavi University دانشگاه پهلوی Dāneshgāh-e Pahlavi) is a public university located in Shiraz, Fars, Iran, established in 1946. Being one of the oldest and most prestigious modern universities in Iran, Shiraz University is listed among the top three research-oriented schools in the nation according to a ranking of Iranian universities based on scientific output. In the first report of state universities ranking and among almost 70 universities and higher education institutes, Shiraz University is regarded as a tier-one university.

Shiraz University has pioneered the establishment of doctoral programs in Iran. Currently and after the separation of medical universities from universities under Ministry of Science, Research and Technology the university has over 20,000 students, with 200 bachelor's degree programs (BA, BSc), 300 master's degree programs (MA, MSc), one professional degree program (Doctor of Veterinary Medicine or DVM), and 150 PhD programs.

== History ==
=== Foundation ===
Shiraz University traces its roots to 1946, with the establishment of a technical college aimed at training specialists in the medical sciences with a four-year program. Initially called the High Institute of Health, it developed into a medical school in 1950. In 1953, the Namazi School of Nursing and the Colleges of Agriculture and Arts and Sciences were established. With the addition of the College of Engineering and College of Veterinary Medicine in 1954, the school was elevated to university-status and named after the reigning Pahlavi dynasty. Other units that were subsequently added were the Dental School in 1969, the Graduate School and College of Electronics in 1969, Dentistry in 1970, and the Colleges of Law and Education in 1977.

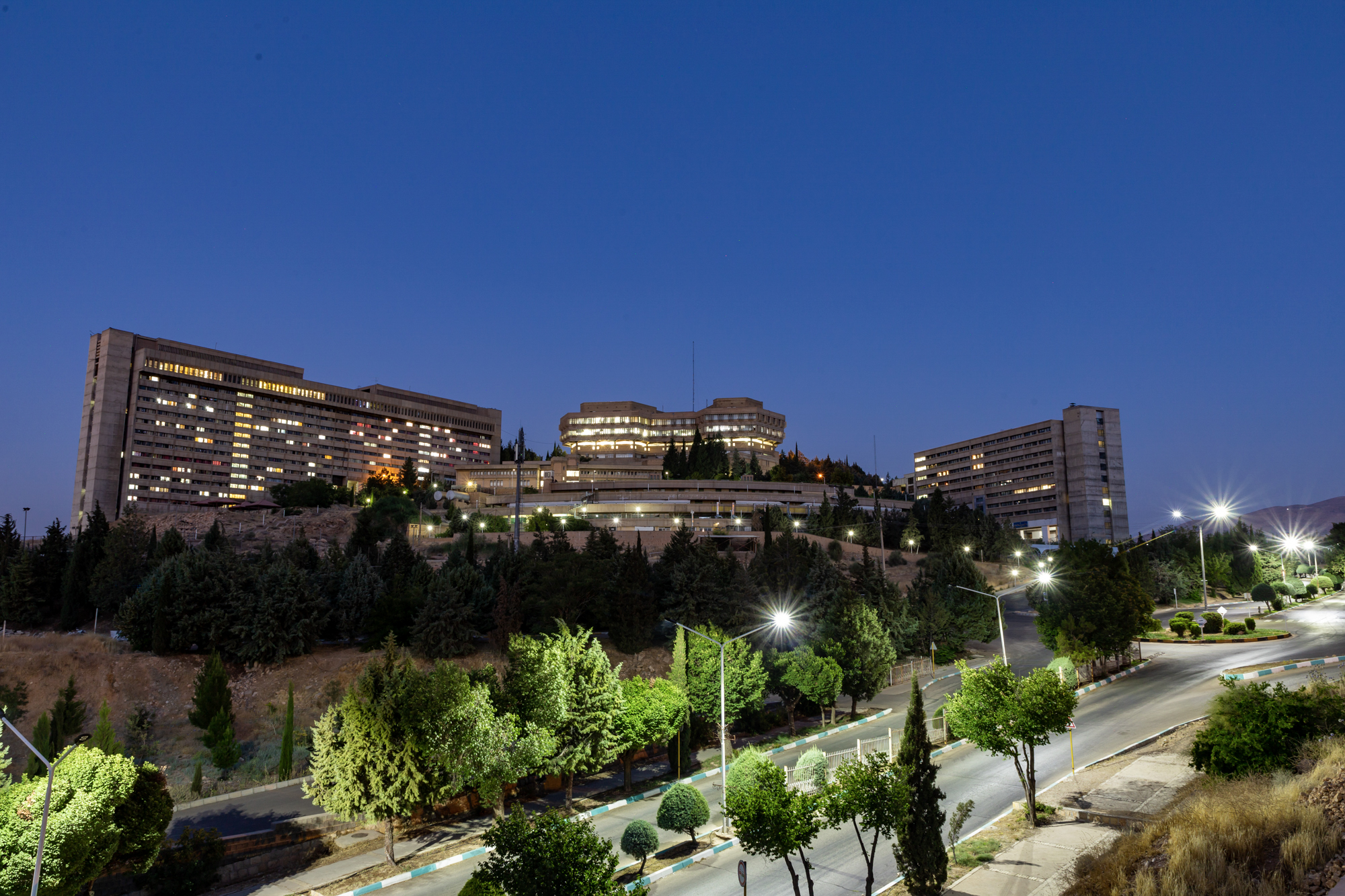
Shiraz University's Main Campus (Eram) at night

=== Pahlavi University ===
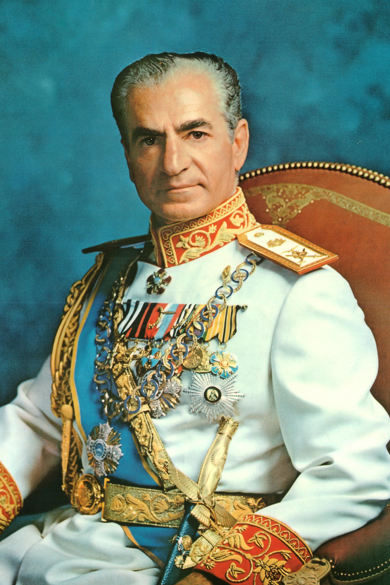
Mohammad Reza Pahlavi

In 1960, Mohammad Reza Pahlavi, Shah of Iran invited the atomic physicist Gaylord P. Harnwell, president of the University of Pennsylvania (Penn), to come to Iran and examine Iran's higher education institutions. At the Shah's request, Harnwell prepared a report entitled A Pattern for a New University in Iran, and the Shah subsequently decided that Penn would assist the Iranian government in transforming Pahlavi University into the only institution in Iran based on American-style higher education. The University of Pennsylvania thus became highly influential in shaping many of Pahlavi University's departments and institutions. Harnwell and Penn assisted the Iranian government in establishing American-style higher education by supervising the new university's academic and administrative system in its early years. Many faculty members from Penn were sent to Pahlavi University to teach and carry out research, and a widespread exchange program was established. The president of the University of Pennsylvania was awarded an honorary degree in Shiraz, in recognition of the help of Penn to Pahlavi University.

The development of Pahlavi University, as it then was, was directly under the supervision and management of this renowned American university, to the point that the scientific and cultural relations between the two universities became one of the strongest scientific and cultural relationships between Iran and the United States. This continued until the last days of the Shah. In 1962, Isa Sedigh became responsible for implementing the Ivy League's models at Pahlavi University. The development of many courses, the design and development of university campuses, the training of professors, and the establishment of many research institutes at Pahlavi University were all assigned to this Ivy League university. Later, during the administration of Houshang Nahavandi (fa), the famous Kent State University also participated in the formation and development of Pahlavi University.

Pahlavi University became the first university in Iran to receive an international-level accreditation for its degrees, as well as the first Iranian university where a Nobel Prize winner gave a lecture. In the Pahlavi era, Shiraz was called the sister of Princeton in the United States. Linus Pauling, scientist, peace activist, author, and winner of two Nobel Prizes, in Chemistry and Peace, came to Nowruz in Iran in 1975 at the invitation of the Iranian Society of Chemists to deliver a speech to the first Iranian Congress of Chemists. This congress was held at Pahlavi University.

The university was also the first in Iran to have a board of trustees. The members of this board were the minister of the court, the minister of culture, the chancellor of the university, the governor of Fars, the CEO of the Planning Organization, the CEO of the National Iranian Oil Company, and between nine and fifteen others, competent cultural and financial personalities and captains of industry, chosen by the Ministry of Court and Culture, with the approval of Mohammad Reza Shah Pahlavi, and appointed for a period of six months. The chairman of the board of trustees was the minister of the court, and in his absence the minister of culture. This board of trustees was the legal representative of the university at that time, and all scientific, technical, educational, financial, administrative and employment affairs of the university were managed under its supervision. Later, after the Iranian revolution of 1979, ministers Mostafa Moeen and Reza Malekzadeh, both university alumni, introduced a similar system for other universities in Iran.

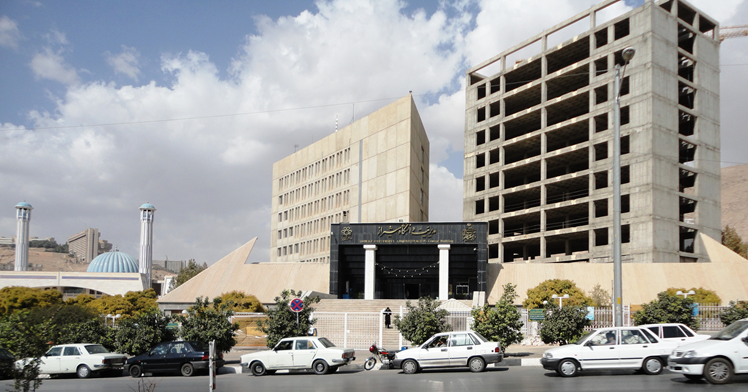
Shiraz University Administration Building

=== After revolution ===
After the 1979 Islamic Revolution overthrew the Pahlavi dynasty, drastic changes were implemented at all universities. The name of Pahlavi University was immediately changed to Shiraz University. All universities were closed for three years in a so-called Iran's Cultural Revolution of 1980-1987 to Islamize all the universities. Later in 1986, the Iranian Ministry of Health, Treatment, and Medical Education took over the schools related to health and medical sciences including mainly Medicine, Dentistry, Pharmacy, and Nursing which resulted in the separation of these schools from the university campus and the establishment of Shiraz University of Medical Sciences. Also in 2004, former Electronic Industries College which was originally founded in 1968, was named Shiraz University of Technology as an independent university.

Since then, Shiraz University acted as "The Mother/Maternal University" (Persian: دانشگاه مادر) and became responsible for the establishment of many later founded universities in the south of Iran including Hormozgan, Persian Gulf in Bushehr, Yasouj, Shiraz University of Technology, Fasa, Shiraz University of Arts among others. Shiraz University is also responsible for monitoring and evaluating 166 universities and institutes of higher education in Fars province.

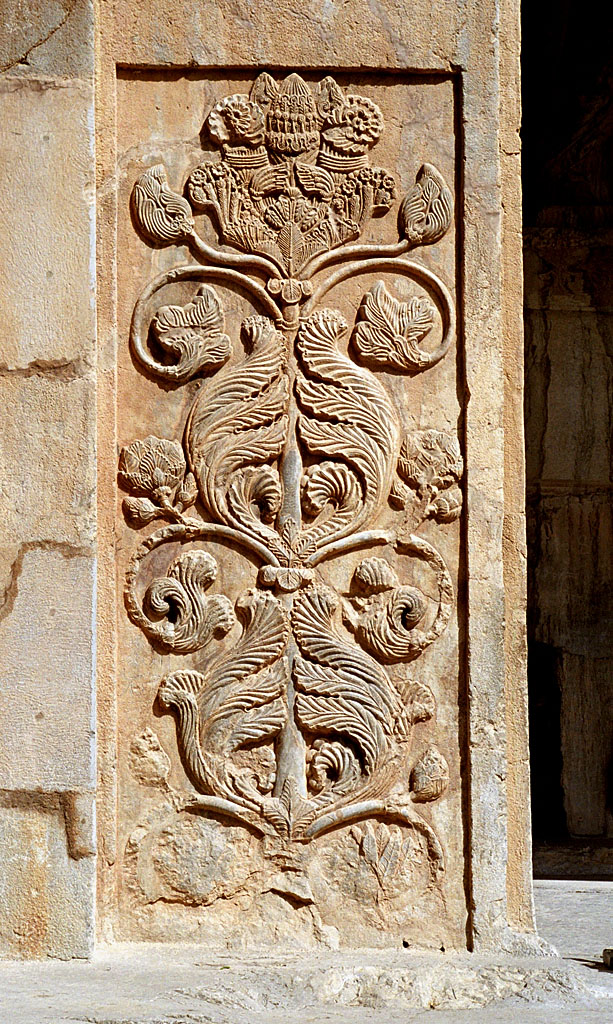
Taq-e Bostan Tree of Life Relief and The Basic Motif for current Seal

Shiraz University also pioneered many PhD programs for the first time in Iran. Among them are Organic chemistry and Chemistry-Physics.

=== Seal ===
The official seal of the Shiraz University serves as the signature and symbol of authenticity on documents issued by the university. Before the Islamic Revolution in Iran, a logo was used as the official logo of Pahlavi University inspired by Persepolis. The logo was inscribed with two words; Wisdom and Endeavor. However, after the revolution, this logo was also changed.

After the Revolution, the later seal designed by the current faculty of Department of Arts, Bahman Feizabi inspired by the logo designed for the Asia Institute.

University Seal Changing through the Years

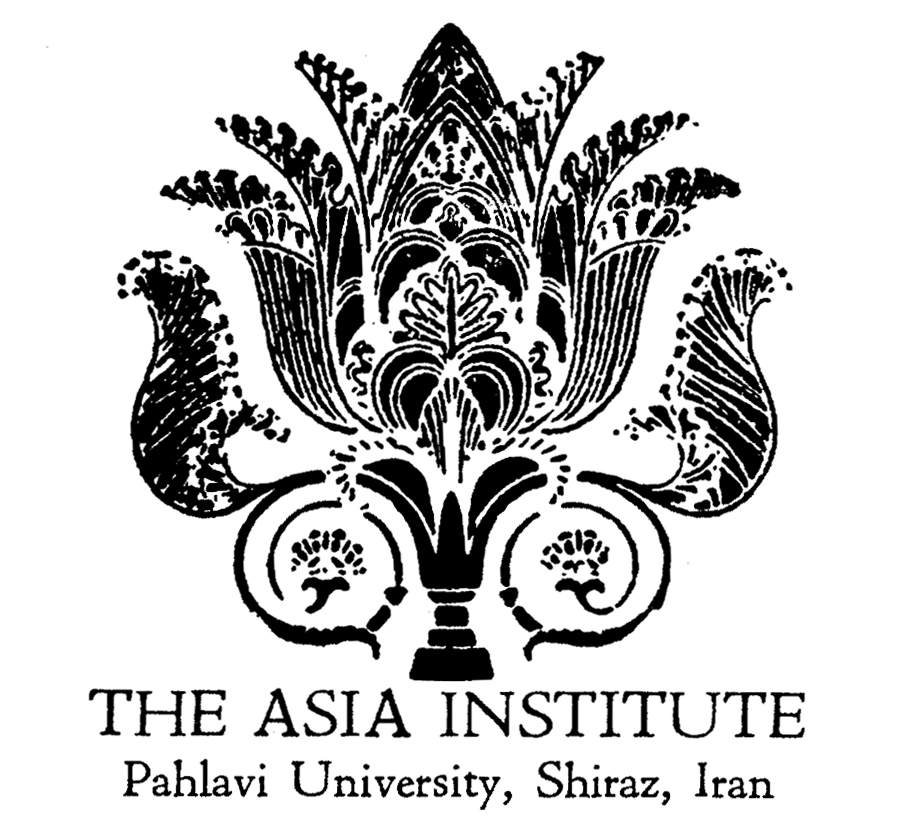
The Asia Institute Seal

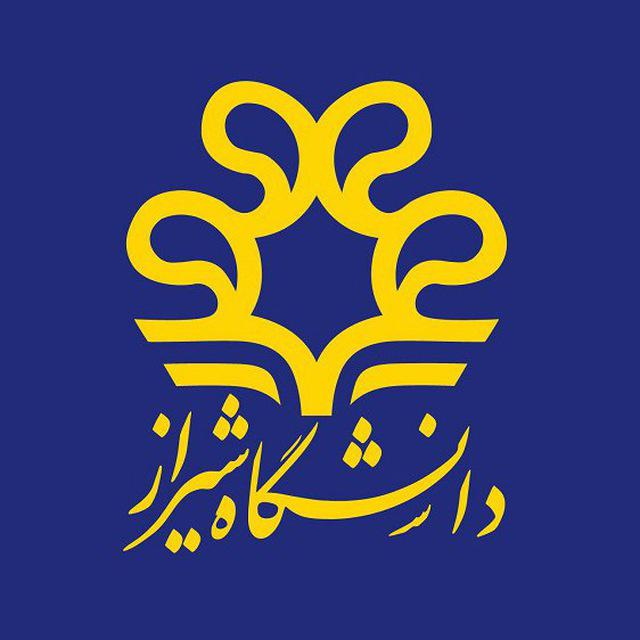
Shiraz University Seal

== Campus ==
=== Eram Paradise Campus (main campus) ===
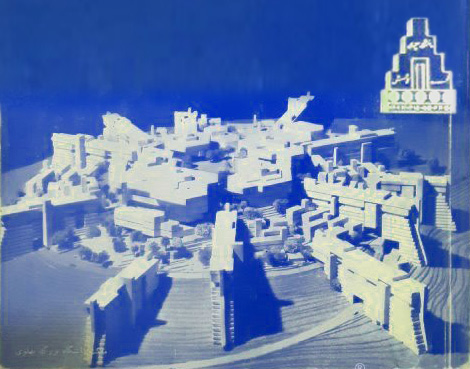
Shiraz University Big Replica

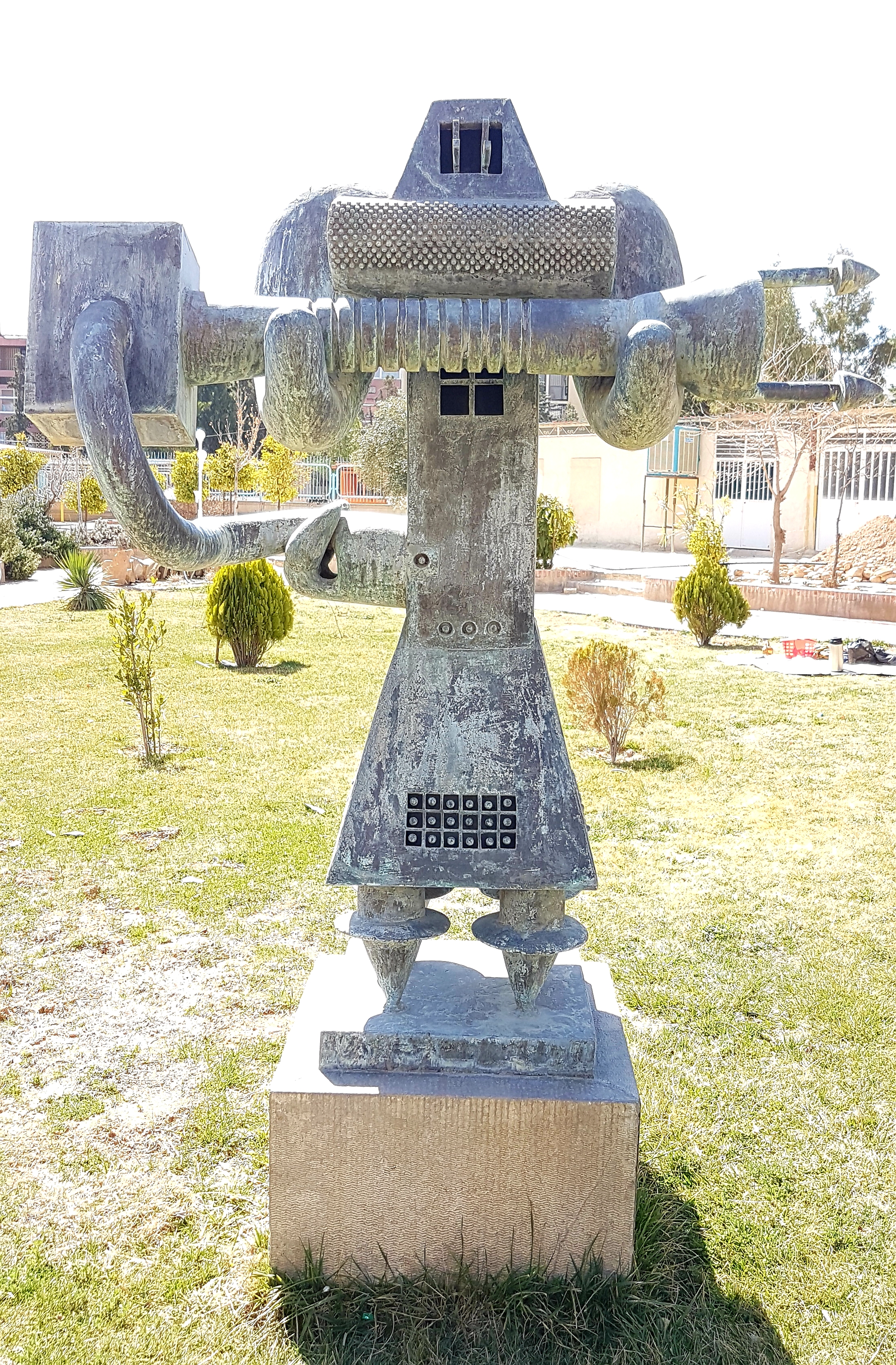
I want my darling by Parviz Tanavoli located at the School of Art and Architecture

Shiraz University has the second-biggest campus in Iran. The Eram Hill lands mostly owned by Shirazi tycoons Mohammad Namazi and Zabihollah Ghorban dedicated to university and was initially designed by American architect Minoru Yamasaki, who also designed the World Trade Center. Later in 1968 during the further constructing of the university campus and while Shiraz was getting ready to host its first Shiraz Arts Festival, many Iranian visual artists including Parviz Tanavoli, Sohrab Sepehri, Abolghasem Saeedi, Bahman Mohasses and Hossein Zenderoudi got involved designing artistic elements and wall paintings for the amphitheater, self-service dining and outside the campus.

In 1969, during the first Shiraz art festival, with the suggestion and invitation of Farah Pahlavi, then Queen of Iran a complex was designed by renowned contemporary architect, Alvar Aalto, for Shiraz Museum of Arts. The project halted due to the sudden death of Aalto in 1976. In 2016 Aalto University and Finnish embassy in Iran contacted Shiraz University regarding full documentation of design drafts by Aalto himself. In 2018, Shiraz Municipality and a two Iranian and Finnish investing partners got involved in project although the project halted once again because of new sanctions and lack of budget.

After more than 70 years, the university campus originally designed plan for central dormitory and school buildings is still not completed and is under construction under multi-year planning. After the 1979 revolution, many lands owned by the university divided due to different causes such as separation of Shiraz University of Medical Sciences, insufficiency of maintenance costs, lack of budget, urban planning, or other reasons.

=== The Asia Institute ===
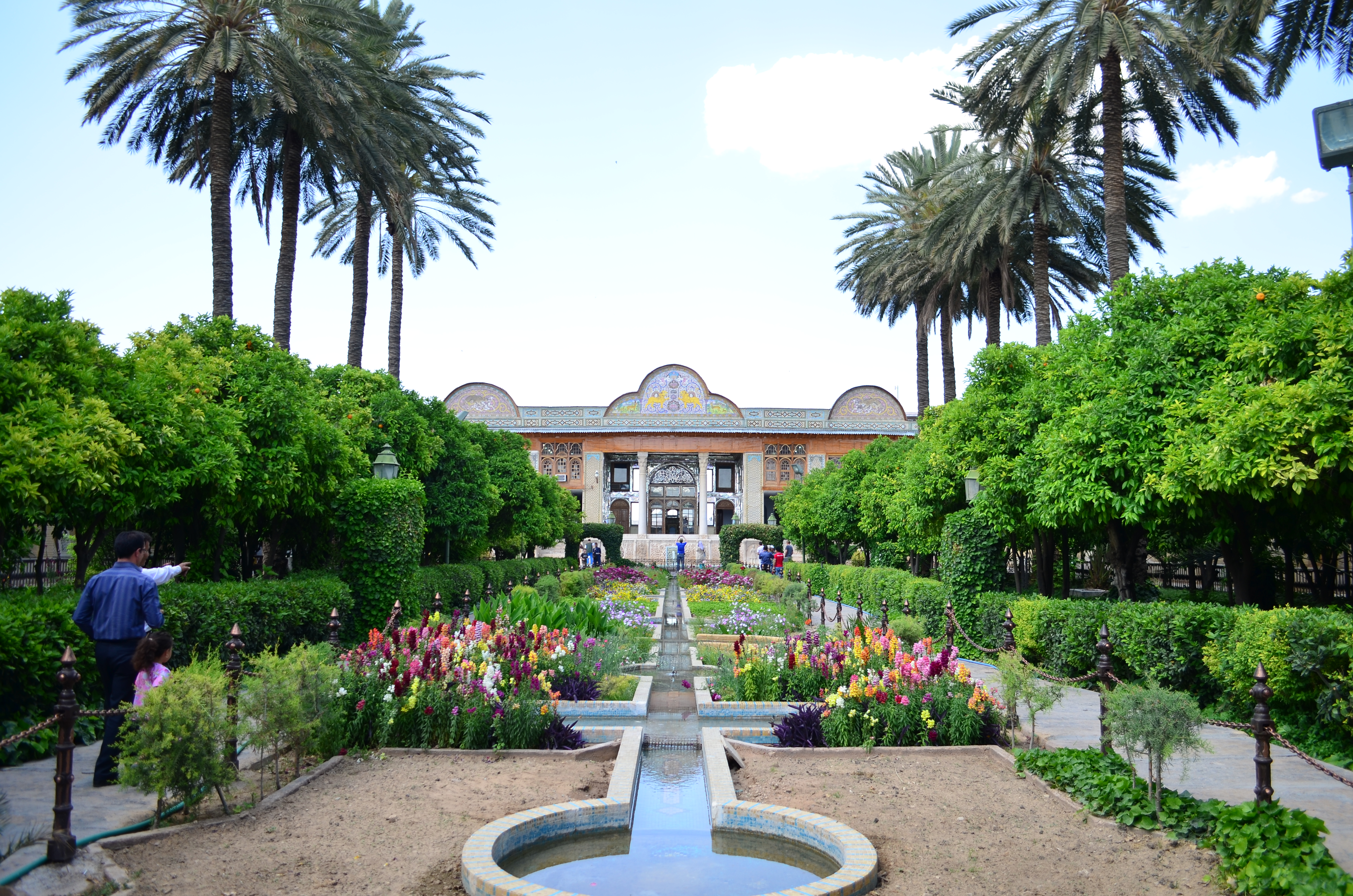
Narenjestan of Ghavam, Home to The Asia Institute

In 1966, the New York based Asia Institute under Arthur Upham Pope re-established itself under the university supervision at Narenjestan Museum.

With the death of Pope, the management of the institute was entrusted to Richard Nelson Frye. Before that, due to the Pope's close relationship with the Iranian royal family, the institute had autonomy, but after him, it went completely under the supervision of the Pahlavi University of Shiraz. This caused tensions in the institution. Among them, Houshang Nahavandi, then chancellor of Pahlavi University, claimed that Gluck, a member of the institute, was involved in smuggling Iranian antiques to Japan and demanded his removal. On the other hand, after receiving the title of professorship from Harvard University, Frye had less time to attend the institute. Despite all this, the research and educational activities of the institute continued. In 1971, on the eve of the celebrations of the 2,500-year celebration of the Persian Empire, the Asian Institute held a large seminar entitled "Iranian Studies" in Shiraz. In 1975, the institute's contract with Dr. Frye ended and Mahyar Navabi, who had previously been the executive director of the institute, was appointed president of the institute. He was the first Iranian president of the Asian Institute of Pahlavi University. At this time, the institute moved from Narenjestan to a larger building on the university campus and became a part of the university's linguistics department.

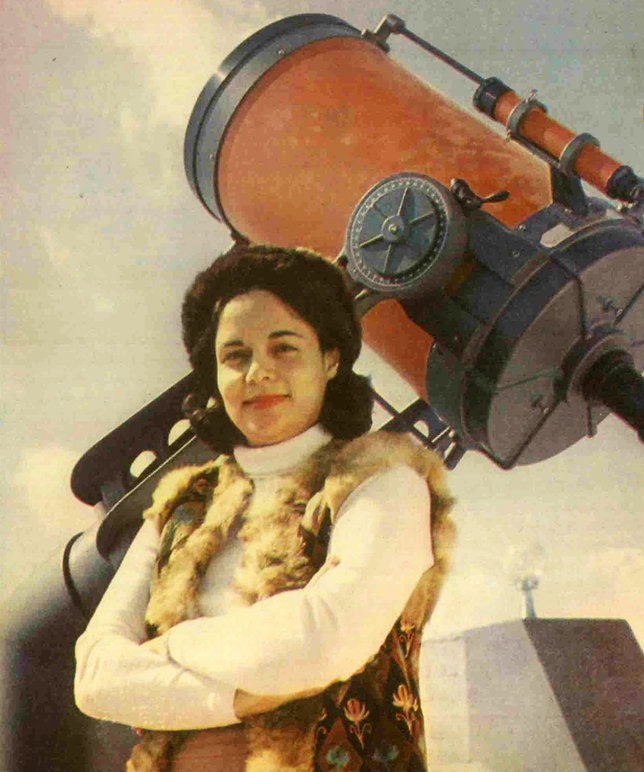
Shahla Solhju the first co-director of Abu Reihan Observatory pictured with the main telescope

=== Biruni Observatory ===
Abu Reihan Biruni Observatory was set up and established by Yousef Sobouti in collaboration with Edward Guinan and Robert H. Koch in 1975. The idea to build this center was proposed by Yousef Sobouti in the late 1960s to promote observational astronomy and training a new generation of astronomers in Iran before building a large national telescope. In Fall 1969, Robert H. Koch (1929–2010), the head of the Department of Astronomy & Astrophysics of the University of Pennsylvania, visited Shiraz to evaluate a possible construction of an observatory for Shiraz University. He encouraged Shiraz University and proposed his suggestions for developing Astronomy in Iran. The idea pursued by Sobouti and in 1972, the telescope was finally ordered from the Astro Mechanics company in the United States of America with a cost of about 50K US dollars. Also, in 1976, Iranian Lady Shahla Solhju, one of Iran's very first female professional astronomers, became the first co-director of Abu Reihan Observatory.

The activities of this center have more or less continued over the past decades.

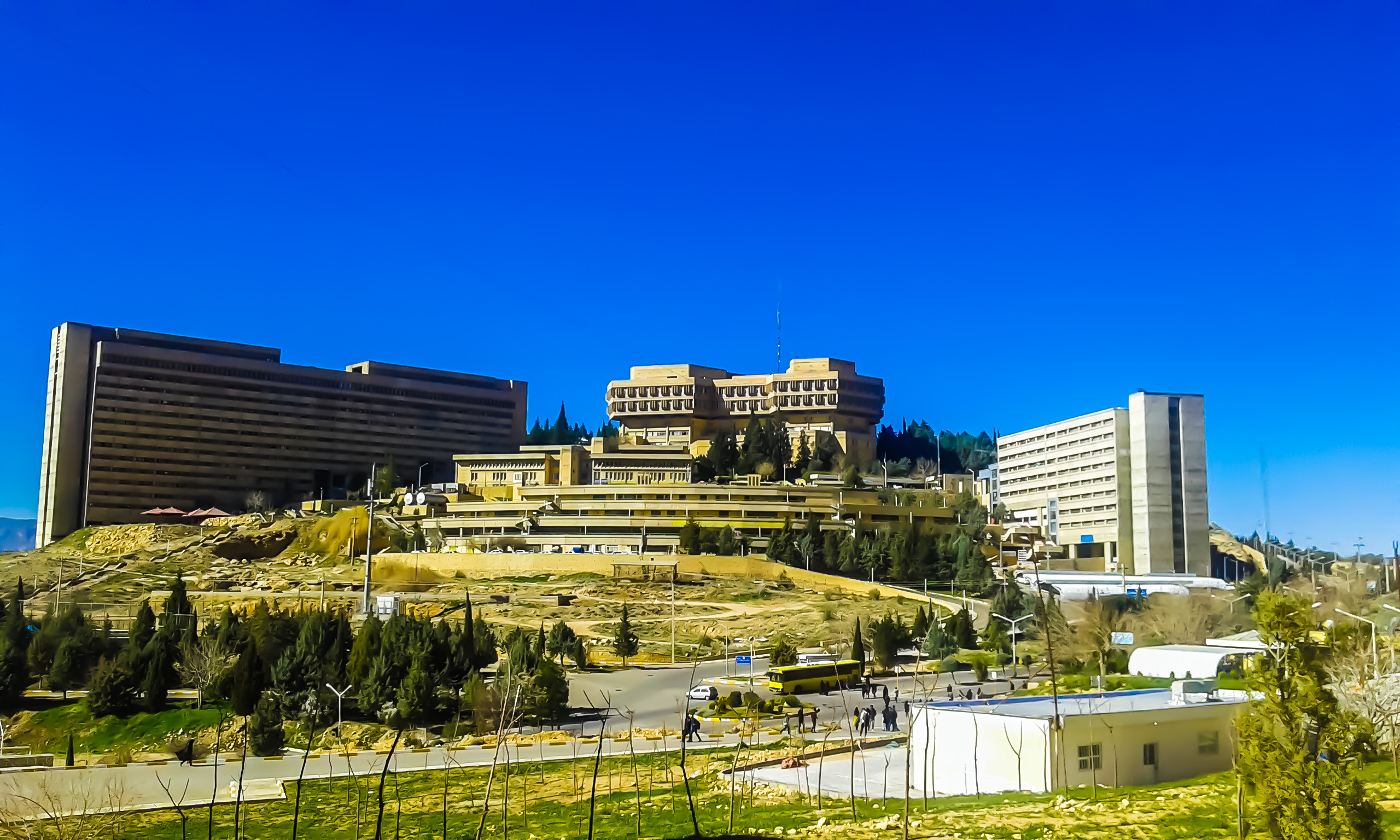
Eram Paradise Campus, with Dormitories and Central Library in the view

=== Libraries ===
Mulla Sadra Library was established in the early 1960s as the central library for Shiraz University and began its activities as a university library. Mulla Sadra Library is one of the richest university libraries due to its very scarce resources including books, dissertations, and publications and is considered as the only hub for maintaining basic science resources in the south of the country.

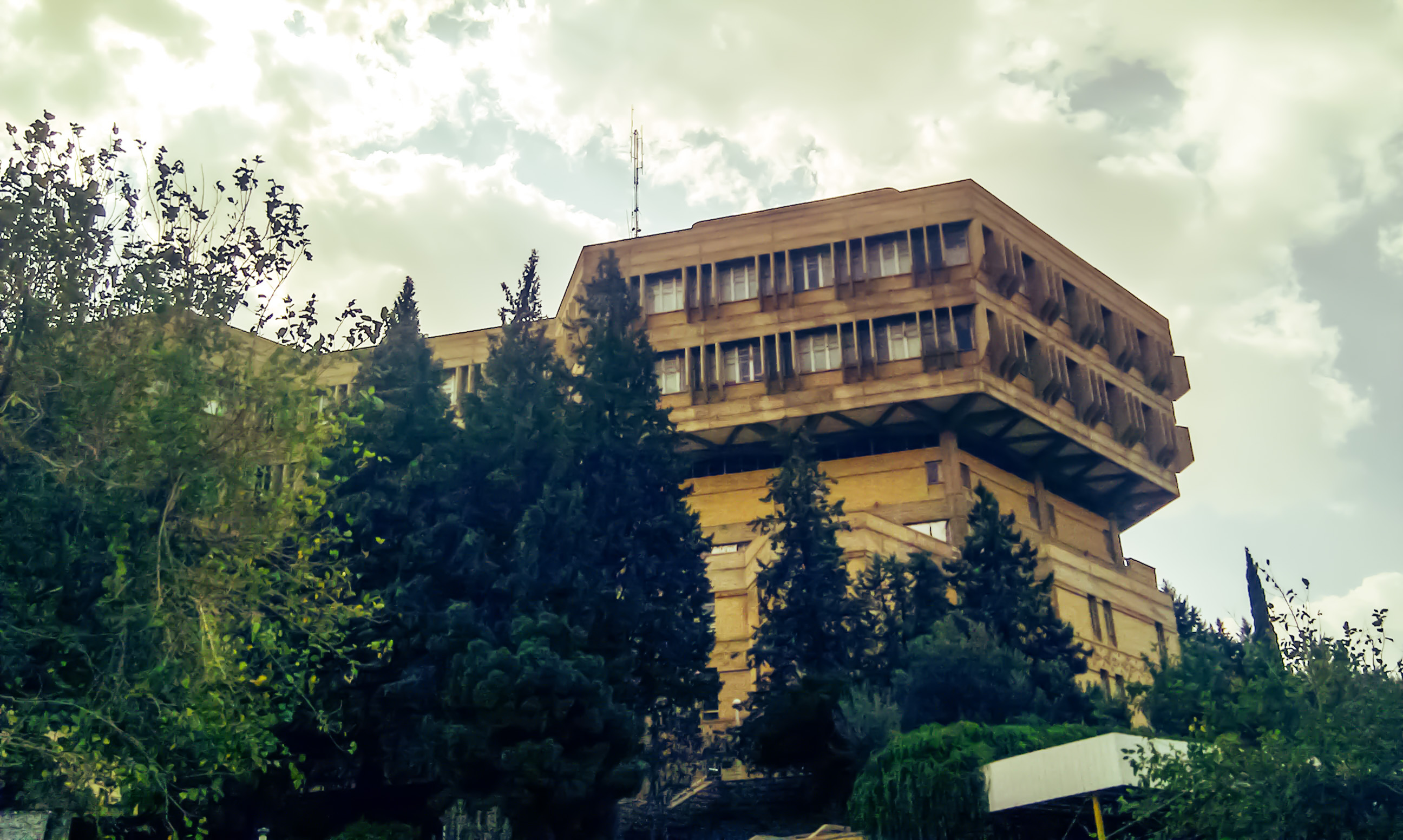
Central Library of Shiraz University

Now, with valuable collections of Persian and Latin books and reference books, archives of old and new magazines and newspapers, documents and manuscripts, and electronic scientific resources, it is one of the prominent university libraries in the country. The total infrastructure of the current building of the Central Library and Documentation Center is about 11,000 square meters and is designed on four floors.

Also, in 1964, with the establishment of the School of Engineering, the library started working with 22 volumes of dictionary books in the vicinity of the classrooms of Engineering Building No. 1. After the development of the faculty building, this library had a study hall, a publication hall, and a limited number of librarians on the second floor of Engineering School No. 1. The new building of the library named after Muhammad ibn Musa al-Khwarizmi, a prominent Muslim mathematician and the father of algebra and arithmetic, with an area of 7220 square meters in eight and a half sections and different sections, was put into operation in 1992. The complex has an amphitheater, central heating, and cooling system, central automatic fire extinguishing system, emergency power system, and many other facilities. Kharazmi Library has one of the richest technical and engineering resources in the country and has a capacity of 700 people at a time.

== Academic profile ==
=== Reputation ===
The university is known to be strict and usually, the grade point average (GPA) of students is lower than their peers in other Iranian universities. Shiraz University is well known as a tough university with a low GPA especially in Civil, Electrical and Mechanical engineering. As such, many students of Shiraz University believe their grades do not reflect their academic performance.

=== Ranking ===
University rankings
- Shiraz University

Global – Overall
- ARWU World: 701–800 (2020)
- CWTS World: 567 (2026)
- QS World: 791-800 (2026)
- THE World: 801-1,000 (2026)
- USNWR Global: 1,081 (2025)

Regional – Overall
- QS Asia: 226 (2026)

According to a report by the Ministry of Science, Research and Technology (Iran) published in 2010 and 2011, Shiraz University ranked 6th respectively between 64 and 68 non-medical universities and institutions in Iran. It was also one of the top three non-technical and non-medical universities along with the University of Tehran and Tarbiat Modares University in a 2012 ranking.

According to the 2017 rankings of the best universities given by the Times Higher Education, Shiraz University has been ranked in the top 3 universities in Iran. In 2016 only eight universities from Iran were included in this ranking, whereas in 2017, fourteen universities from Iran were among the top universities rankings. Based on these rankings, Shiraz University became the best comprehensive university in Iran.

Besides, regarding the 2019 rankings of the best universities given by the Times Higher Education (THE), Shiraz University's Computer discipline has been ranked in the top 3 universities in Iran. Also, based on the teaching criterion of the ranking in Computer Science, Shiraz University has achieved the first rank in Iran.

=== Iranian Science and Culture Hall of Fame members ===
Iranian Science and Culture Hall of Fame is a formal ceremony to honor influential contemporary scientific and cultural eminence. Many faculty and alumni have been receiving the award. Among them are:

- Mahmoud Yaghoubi – Mechanical Engineering
- Mansour Rastegar Fasaei – Persian Literature and Iranology
- Habib Firouzabadi – Chemistry
- Keramatollah Izadpanah – Agriculture and Virology
- Afsaneh Safavi – Chemistry
- Saeed Sohrabpour – Mechanical Engineering
- Ali Akbar Hosseini Sarvi – Educational Psychology
- Arsalan Ghahramani – Civil Engineering (Geotechnics)
- Mansour Taheri -Chemical Engineering
- Jafar Mehrad – Library and Information Science
- Mohammad Mehdi Alishahi – Aerospace Engineering

== Athletics ==
The first university horse manege was opened at Shiraz University in 2011.

Championship and public sports, dormitory, boys

The General Department of Physical Education under the Ministry of Science, Research, and Technology allocates substantial funds to enhance the sports landscape, focusing on the construction of stadiums, complexes, sports clubs, and the provision of sports equipment. It assumes a crucial role in catering to the diverse needs of affiliated entities, emphasizing sports and related activities.

The Department of Championship and General Sports, housed within the Boys' Dormitory of Shiraz University's Physical Education Management, is dedicated to planning and executing comprehensive sports programs. These initiatives aim to promote healthy recreation among male students and encompass various tasks:

1. Provision of public sports services, including daily sports activities, free access to university sports facilities, and organizing public sports festivals.
2. Offering championship sports services by recruiting and forming select student sports teams for regional competitions and Olympiads.
3. Fostering continuous student participation in diverse sports activities.
4. Implementation of educational programs across various disciplines.
5. Organization and oversight of sports competitions to ensure their smooth execution.
6. Supplying necessary sports equipment at the university level.
7. Support for talented sports students.
8. Delegating executive responsibilities to students and encouraging volunteerism to strengthen associations.

These efforts collectively contribute to the development and promotion of sports culture within the university community.

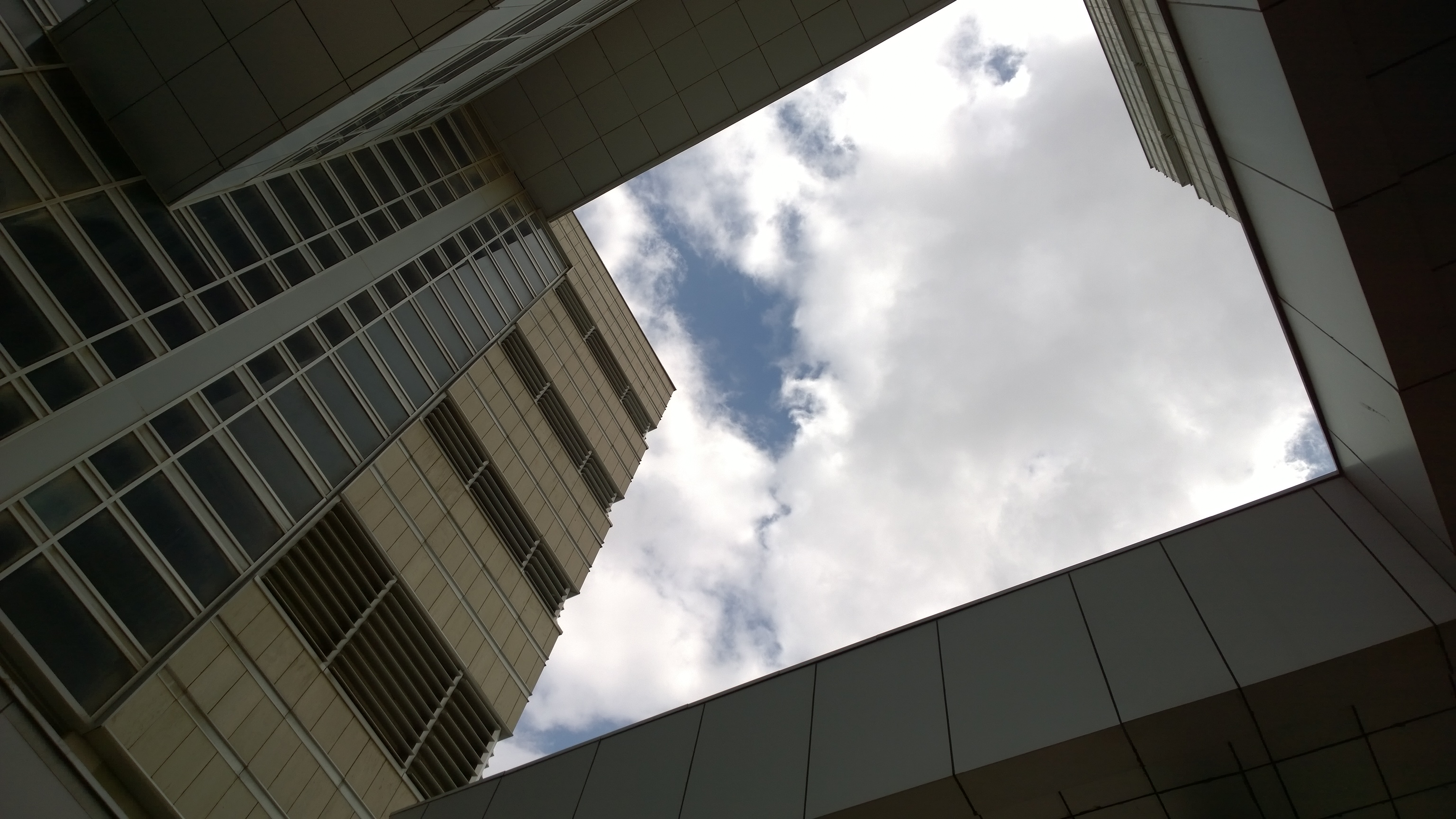
School of Chemical and Petroleum Engineering, Shiraz University

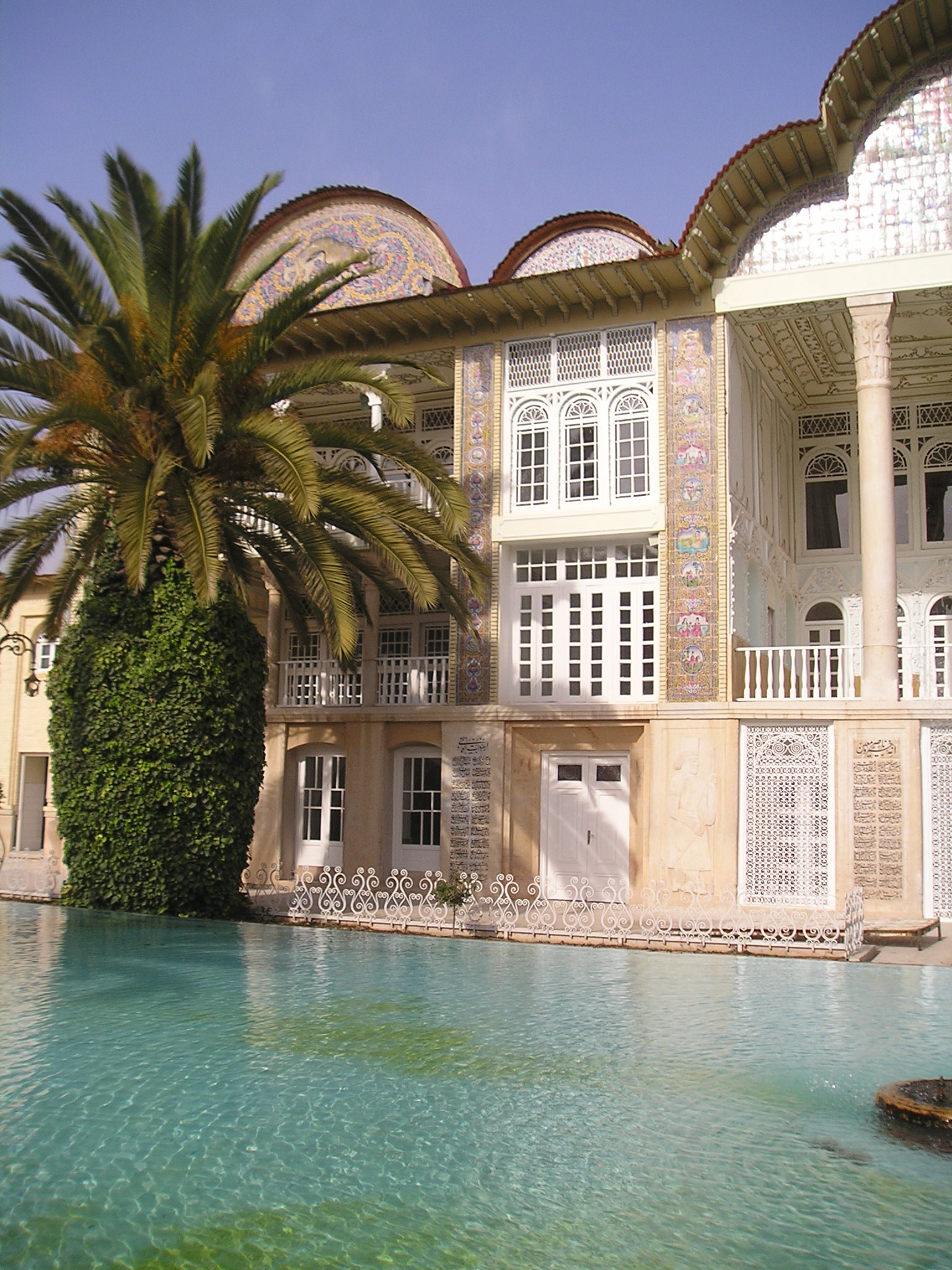
Eram Botanical Garden of Shiraz University

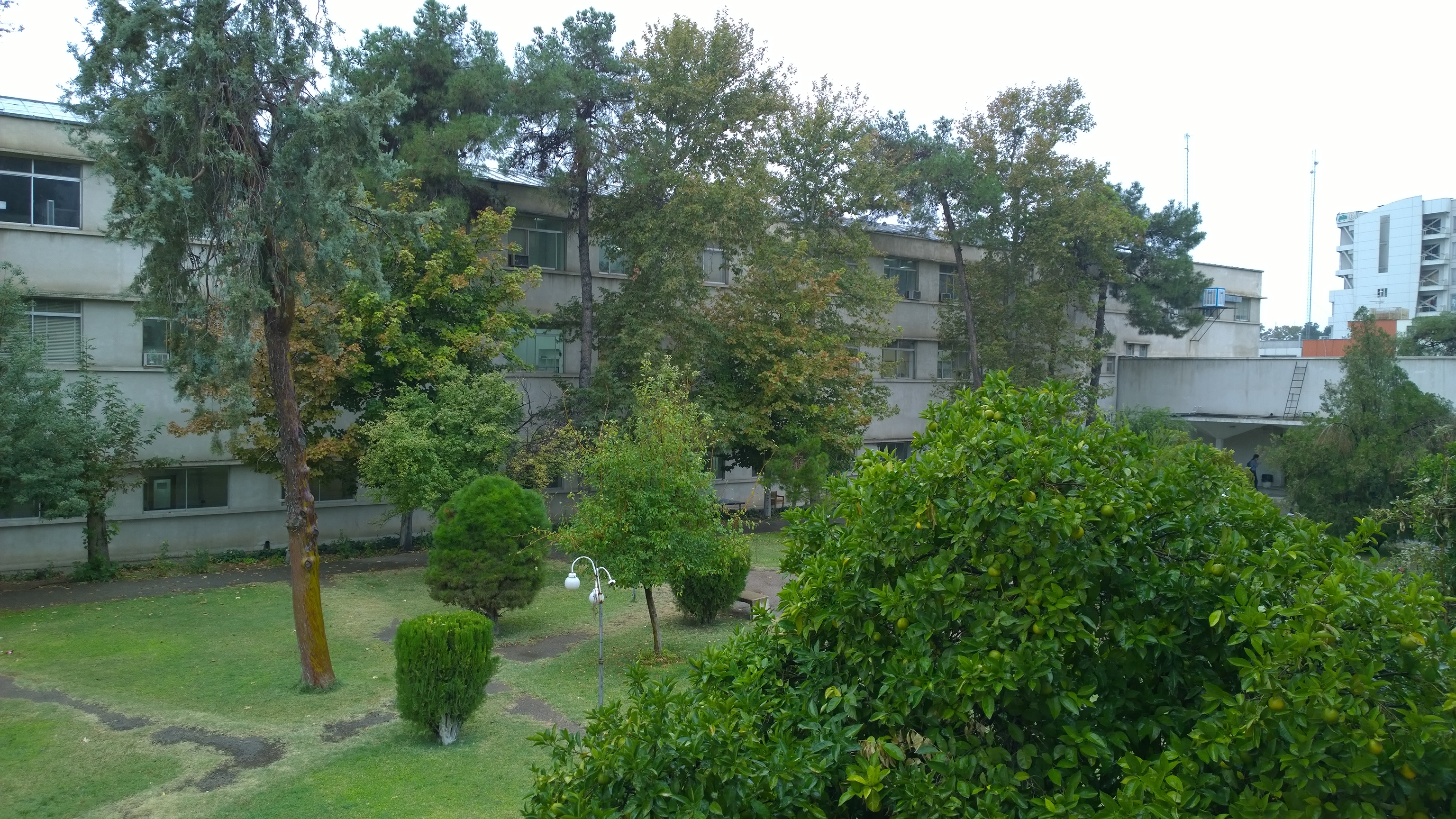
School of Engineering, Shiraz University

== Notable people ==
=== Chancellors ===
Chancellor	Tenure	Alma mater	Speciality
Zabihollah Ghorban	1955–1961	(France) École centrale de Lyon	Medicine
Mohammad Ali Mojtahedi	1961–1962	Université Lille Nord de France	Mechanical Engineering
Lotfali Souratgar	1962–1964	(United Kingdom) University of London	English Literature
Asadollah Alam	1964–1968	(Iran) University of Tehran	Agricultural Engineering
Houchang Nahavandi	1968–1971	(France) University of Paris	Law
Farhang Mehr	1971–1978	(United Kingdom) University of Southampton	International Relations
AmirHoushang Mehryar	1978–1979	(United Kingdom) University of London	Educational Psychology
Hassan Zohour	1979–1981	(United States) Purdue University	Mechanical Engineering
Mostafa Moeen	1981–1983	(Iran) Shiraz University	Medicine
Mohammad Reza Fartoukzadeh	1983–1984	(Iran) Shiraz University	Medicine
Reza Malekzadeh	1984–1987	(Iran) Shiraz University	Medicine
Abdolhamid Riazi	1987–1989	(Canada) University of Calgary	Pure Mathematics
Seyed Reza Ghazi	1989–1992	(United Kingdom) University of Bristol	Veterinary medicine
Gholam Hossein Zamani	1992–1996	(United States) University of Nebraska–Lincoln	Agriculture and Educational Management
Mohammad Mehdi Alishahi	1996–1997	(United States) MIT	Mechanical Engineering
Mahmoud Mostafavi	1997–2000	(United Kingdom) Newcastle University	Mechanical Biosystems Engineering
Majid Ershad-Langeroodi	2000–2005	(United States) University of Iowa	Mathematics
Mohammad Hadi Sadeghi	2005–2009	(Iran) Tarbiat Modares University	Criminal Law
Mohammad Moazzeni	2009–2013	(Iran) Shiraz University	Parasitology
Majid Ershad-Langeroodi	2013–2016	(United States) University of Iowa	Mathematics
Ebrahim Goshtasbi Rad	2016–2018	(Iran) Shiraz University	Mechanical Engineering
Hamid Nadgaran	2018–2021	(United Kingdom) University of Manchester	Physics
Mohammad Moazzeni	2021–2025	(Iran) Shiraz University	Parasitology
Alireza Afsharifar	2025–	(Australia) University of Adelaide	Molecular Virology

=== Notable faculty and alumni ===
- Bizhan Aarabi, neurosurgeon
- Asadollah Alam, former chancellor, a close advisor of Shah Mohammad Reza Pahlavi
- Masoud Alimohammadi, assassinated professor of quantum and elementary-particle physics
- Ali Babachahi. poet, writer, researcher, and literary critic
- Iraj Bashiri, professor of history, University of Minnesota
- Hossein Baharvand, stem cell and developmental biologist and director of Royan Institute
- Seifollah Dad, screenwriter and filmmaker and former Administrator of Iranian Organization of Cinema and Audiovisual Affairs
- Gholam-Ali Haddad-Adel, Iranian politician and former chairman of the Iranian parliament
- Sattar Hashemi, faculty, current Minister of Information and Communications Technology of Iran as of 2024.
- Mansoor Hekmat, Iranian Marxist theorist and leader of the worker-communist movement
- Saleh Hosseini, retired professor of literature, translator, and critic
- Ahmad Jalali, Iranian scholar and philosopher
- Mohsen Kadivar, philosopher
- Fatemeh Keshavarz, academic, Rumi and Persian studies scholar, poet
- Maryam Keshavarz, filmmaker
- Leonard Lewisohn, an American author, translator and lecturer in the area of Islamic studies and a specialist in Persian language and Sufi literature.
- Ebadollah S. Mahmoodian, Professor of Mathematics, Sharif University of Technology
- Hassan Makaremi, Iranian artist, painter, and calligrapher, psychoanalyst, and Human Rights Activist
- Reza Malekzadeh, Iranian medical scientist and a gastroenterologist and former Minister of Health
- Mostafa Moeen, Iranian politician and Iran's former Minister of Culture and Higher Education and Minister of Science, Research and Technology
- Ata'ollah Mohajerani, former Minister of Culture and Islamic Guidance during Khatami's first presidency
- Ebrahim Nabavi, satirist, writer, diarist, and researcher
- Sadollah Nasiri Gheydari, professor of physics, University of Zanjan
- Reza Negarestani, philosopher and writer, alumnus, and former lecturer of mathematics in Shiraz University.
- Richard Nelson Frye, Director of the famous "Asia Institute" in Shiraz, and faculty member of Pahlavi University
- Mahmoud Nili Ahmadabadi, professor of metallurgy at University of Tehran and its former chancellor
- Andranik Ovassapian, Iranian-Armenian and American anesthesiologist
- Bahram Parsaei, businessman, politician and former representative of Shiraz electoral district in Iranian Parliament.
- Pouria Poursorkh, actor
- Mohammad Rasoulof, filmmaker
- Moniro Ravanipour, Iranian-American writer
- Sohrab Rohani, The winners of the 2008 Ontario Professional Engineers Awards (OSPE), Chair of Department of Chemical and Biochemical Engineering at University of Western Ontario
- Gholamhossein Saber, painter, photographer, and teacher.
- Kourosh Safavi, linguist and translator, studied Chemical Engineering before moving to Tehran to study German language and literature.
- Alireza Shapour Shahbazi, Persian archaeologist, Iranologist and a world expert on Achaemenid archeology
- Yousef Sobouti, Faculty, Iranian physicist and former head of Physics Department at Shiraz University.
- Saeed Sohrabpour, Former faculty and alumnus, full professor of Mechanical Engineering and former chancellor of Sharif University of Technology and Imam Khomeini International University
- Mohammad Soleimani, former Minister of Communications
- Mohammad Tabibian, economist and former deputy director of the Planning and Budget Organization
- Alireza Tahmasbi, former Minister of Mines and Industry
- Jafar Towfighi, academic, former Minister and Minister senior consultant of Science, Research and Technology
- Mehdi Zeinoddin, former major general during Iran–Iraq War
- Mohammad Ali Zolfigol, former Minister of Culture and Higher Education and Minister of Science, Research and Technology
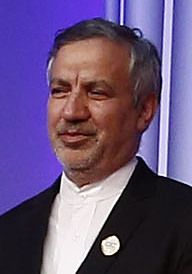
Ataollah Mohajerani: former Minister of Culture and Islamic Guidance during Khatami's first presidency.

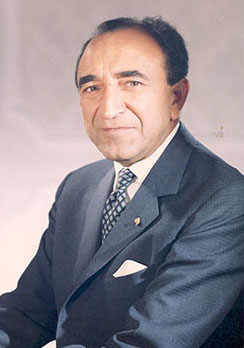
Asadollah Alam: former chancellor, close advisor of Shah Mohammad Reza Pahlavi.

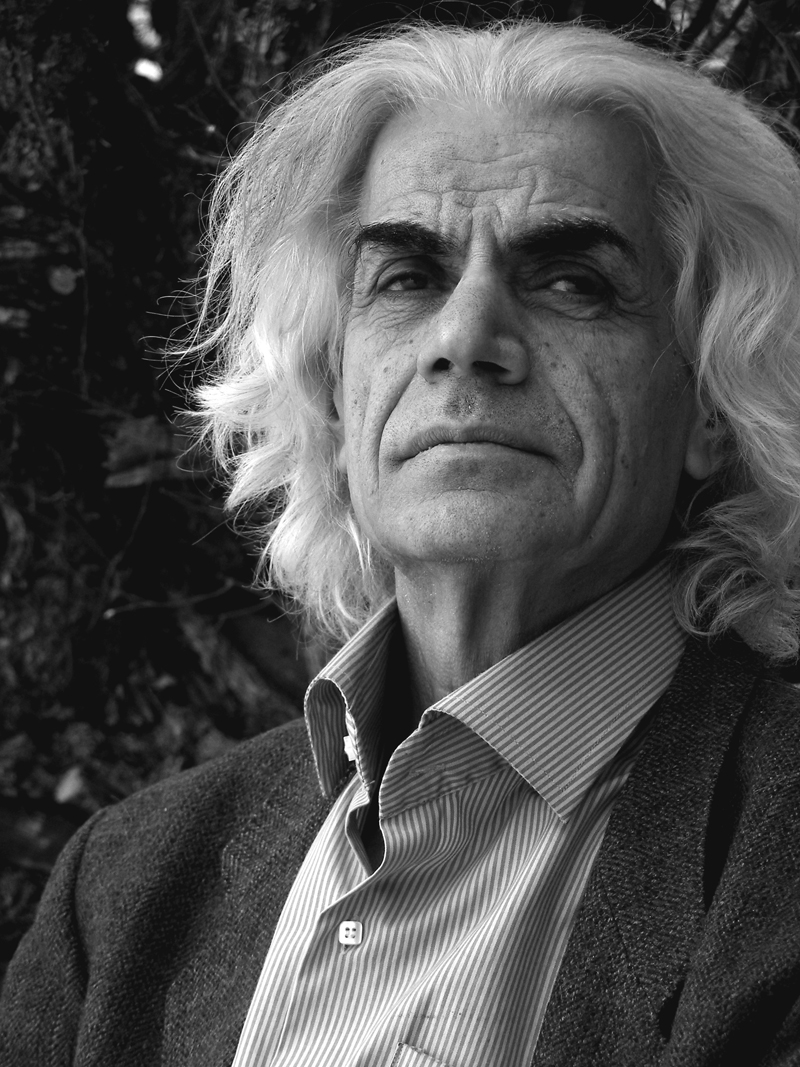
Ali Babachahi: poet, writer, researcher and literary critic.

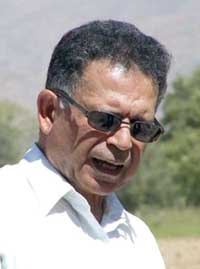
Alireza Shapour Shahbazi: Persian archaeologist, Iranologist and a world expert on Achaemenid archeology.

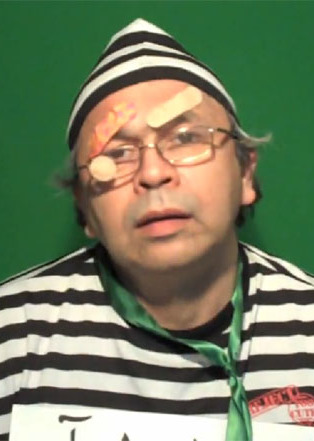
Ebrahim Nabavi: prolific Iranian satirist, writer, diarist, and researcher.

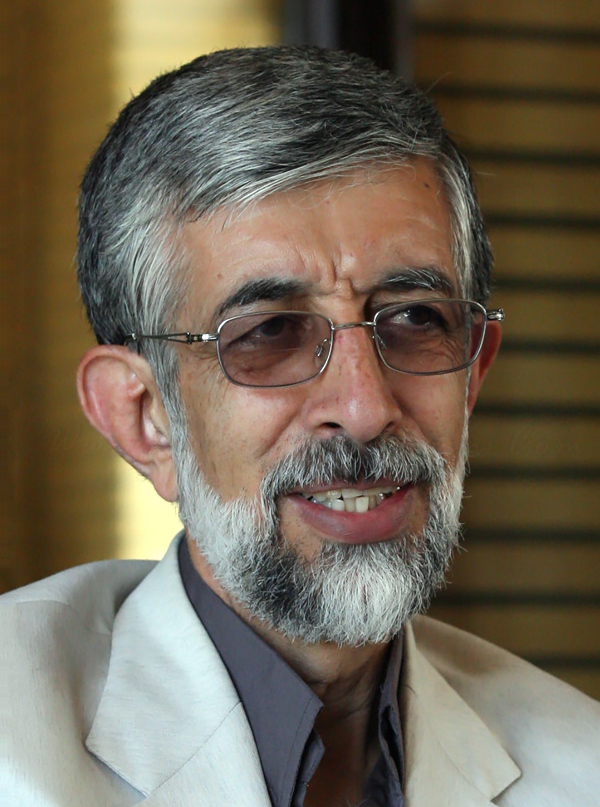
Gholam-Ali Haddad-Adel: Iranian politician and former chairman of the Iranian parliament.

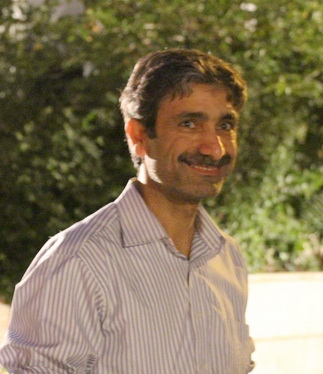
Hossein Baharvand: stem cell and developmental biologist and director of Royan Institute.

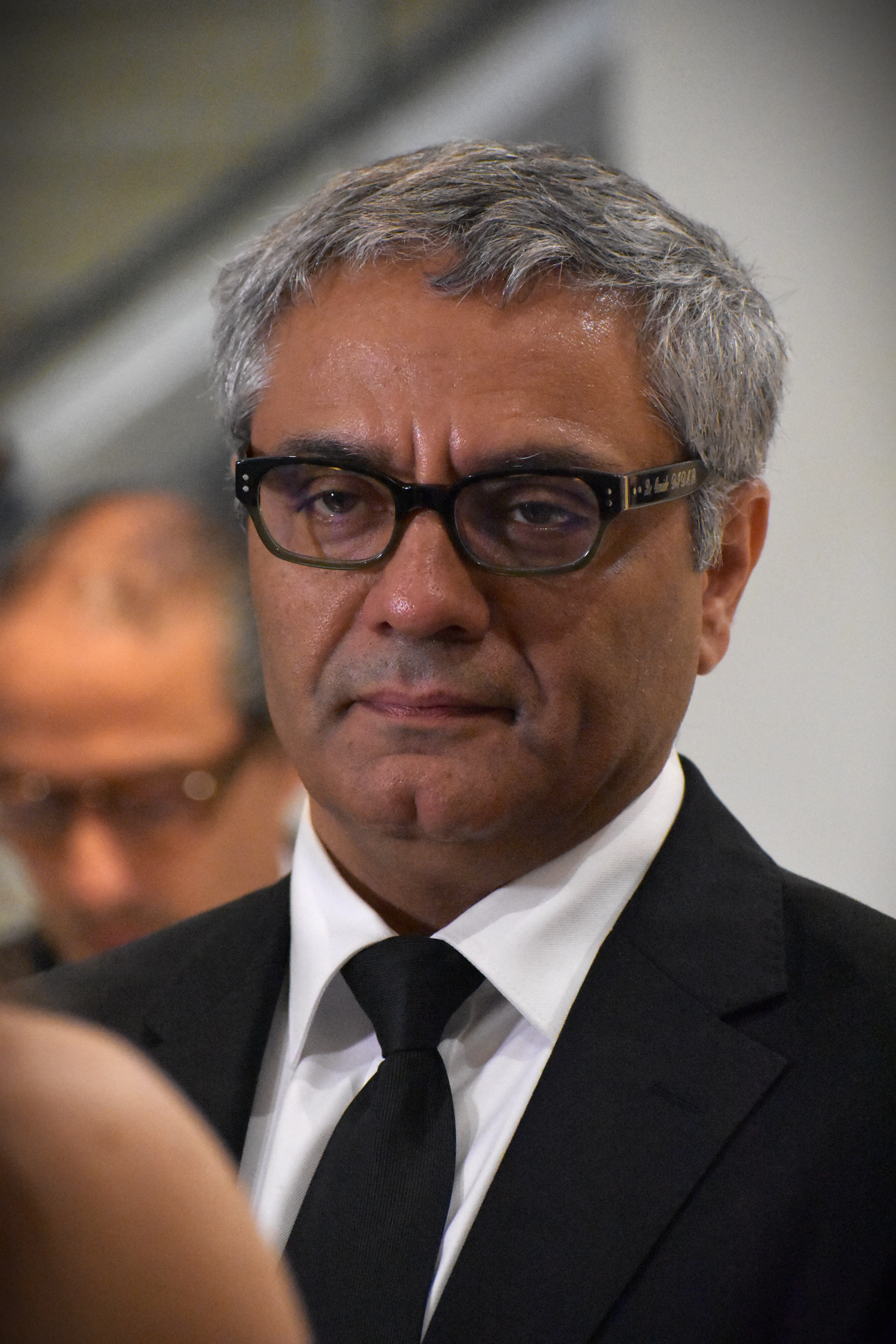
Mohammad Rasoulof: Academy Awards nominated independent filmmaker and winner of Golden Bear at Berlin International Film Festival

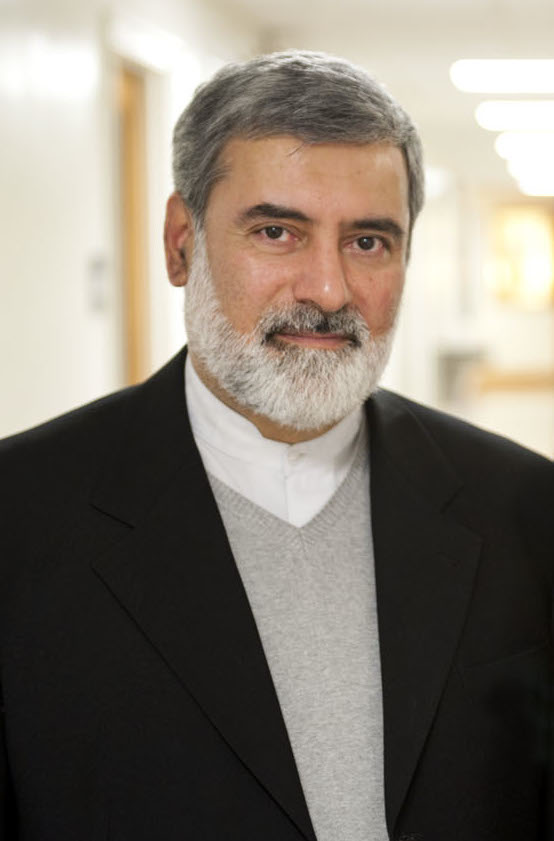
Mohsen Kadivar: philosopher, leading intellectual reformist, and professor of Islamic Studies.

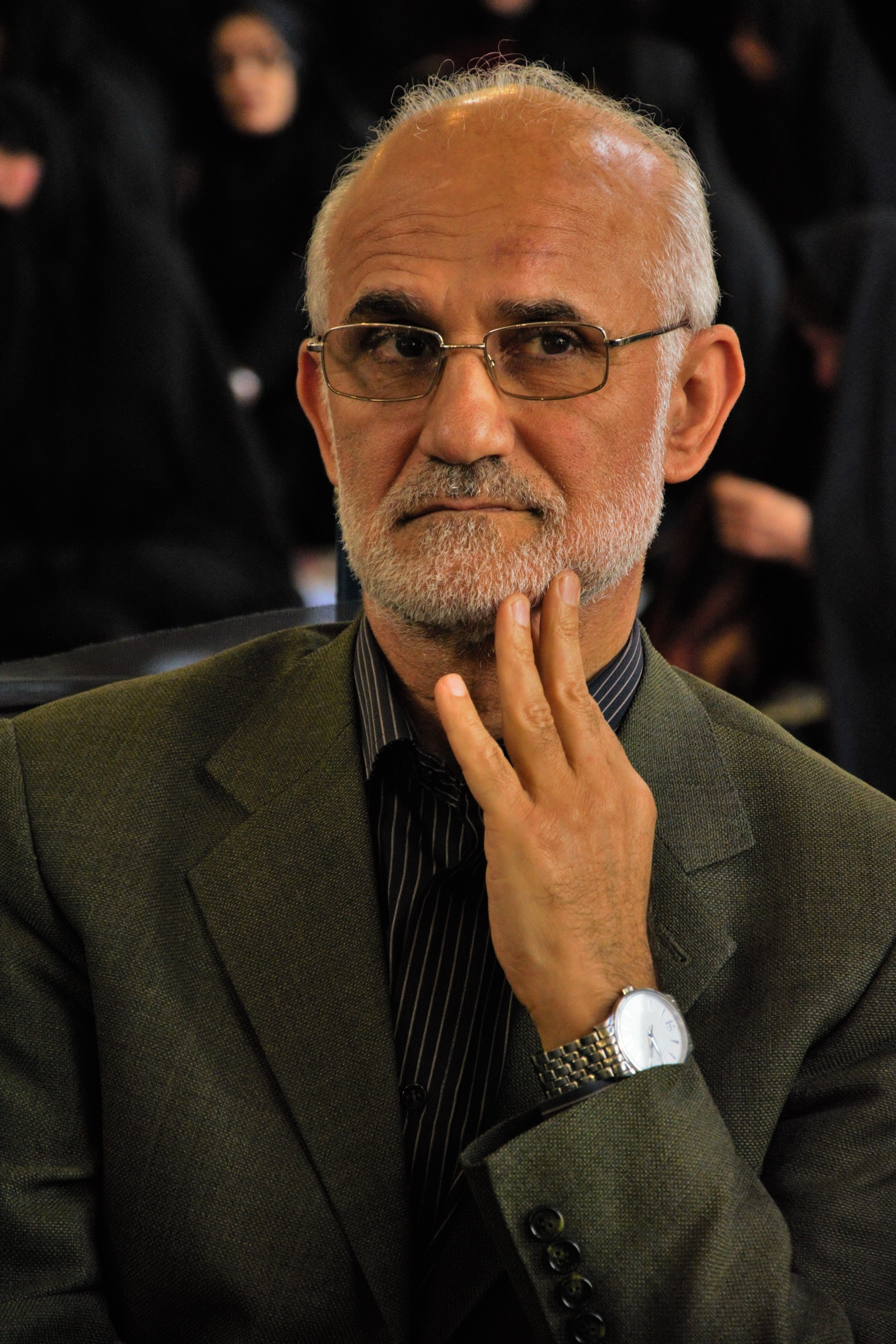
Mostafa Moeen: Iranian politician and Iran's former Minister of Culture and Higher Education and Minister of Science, Research and Technology

== See also ==
- List of Islamic educational institutions
- Education in Iran
- Higher Education in Iran
- List of Iranian scientists
- Modern Iranian scientists and engineers
