= List of contemporary Iranian scientists, scholars, and engineers =

The following is a list of notable Iranian scholars, scientists and engineers around the world from the contemporary period. For pre-modern era, see List of pre-modern Iranian scientists and scholars. For mathematicians, see List of Iranian mathematicians.

== A ==
- Behnaam Aazhang, professor of engineering, Rice University
- Akbar Adibi, electronic engineer, VLSI researcher, professor of engineering, Amirkabir University of Technology
- Majid Adibzadeh, scholar and Political scientist
- Haleh Afshar, academic and peer, University of York
- Ehsan Afshari, professor of Electrical Engineering, University of Michigan
- Masoud Alimohammadi, assassinated quantum field theorist and elementary-particle physicist
- Abbas Amanat, professor of history and international studies at Yale University
- Shahram Amiri
- Mahyar Amouzegar, Operations Researcher, President of New Mexico Tech, author
- Anousheh Ansari, the world's first female space tourist, co-founder and chairman of Prodea Systems, Inc., co-founder and former CEO of Telecom Technologies, Inc. (TTI)
- Farhad Ardalan, physicist, IPM
- Nima Arkani-Hamed, professor, Institute for Advanced Study
- Nasser Ashgriz, professor of mechanical and industrial engineering, University of Toronto
- Touraj Atabaki, professor of social history of the Middle East and Central Asia, Department of History, University of Amsterdam
- Reza Amrollahi, Physicist and the former president of the Atomic Energy Organization of Iran
- Elham Azizi, computational biologists and associate professor, Columbia University.

== B ==
- Mehdi Bahadori, professor of mechanical engineering
- Hossein Baharvand, professor of stem cell and developmental biology, and director of Royan Institute for Stem Cell Biology and Technology
- Shaul Bakhash, historian, George Mason University
- Asef Bayat, professor of sociology and Middle East Studies at the University of Illinois at Urbana-Champaign
- Nariman Behravesh, chief economist and executive vice president, Global Insight
- Mahmoud Behzad, pioneer Iranian biologist
- Mina Bissell, director of UC Berkeley Life Sciences Division

== D ==
- Touraj Daryaee, Iranologist and historian, University of California, Irvine

== E ==
- Abbas Edalat, professor of computer science and mathematics, Imperial College London
- Kamran Elahian, entrepreneur
- Nader Engheta, professor of Electrical Engineering, University of Pennsylvania
- Kamran Eshraghian, VLSI pioneer in Australia

== F ==
- Mohsen Fakhrizadeh, nuclear physicist and scientist, former head of the Organization of Defensive Innovation and Research.
- Fereydoon Family, Samuel Candler Dobbs Professor of Physics, Emory University
- Yasaman Farzan, Kharazmi young scientist Award in 2006, Young Scientist Prize of the International Union of Pure and Applied Physics (IUPAP) in 2008, International Centre for Theoretical Physics Prize in 2013

== G ==
- Nasir Gebelli, computer scientist and video game developer
- Zoubin Ghahramani, professor of information engineering, Department of Engineering, University of Cambridge
- Mohammed Ghanbari, professor, University of Essex
- Mehdi Golshani, professor, Sharif University of Technology

== H ==
- Mohammad Reza Hafeznia, professor, University of Tehran
- Ali Hajimiri, Caltech, professor of electrical engineering, co-founder of Axiom Microdevices Inc.
- Majid Hassanizadeh, professor of hydrogeology; expertise: theories of porous media (Utrecht University, the Netherlands)
- Babak Hassibi, professor of electrical engineering, Caltech
- Mahmoud Hessaby, physicist, father of modern physics in Iran
- Payam Heydari, professor of electrical engineering and computer science, University of California, Irvine

== I ==
- Reza Iravani, professor and the L. Lau Chair in Electrical and Computer Engineering in the Edward S. Rogers Sr. Department of Electrical and Computer Engineering, University of Toronto

== J ==
- Ali Jafari, professor of computer and information technology, Purdue University
- Hamid Jafarkhani, professor in electrical engineering and computer science, University of California, Irvine
- Mona Jarrahi, professor of Electrical Engineering, University of California Los Angeles
- Ali Javan, physicist and inventor of the gas laser at MIT
- Kamaloddin Jenab, pioneering physicist

== K ==
- Naser Kamalian, medical scholar and the father of modern neuropathology in Iran
- Mehran Kardar, physicist, MIT
- Ahmad Karimi-Hakkak, founding director of Center for Persian Studies, University of Maryland
- Homayoon Kazerooni, professor of mechanical engineering at the University of California, Berkeley, co-founder and Chief Scientist of Berkeley Bionics, inventor of the HULC
- Shaygan Kheradpir, chief operating officer, Barclays
- Ayat Karimi, widely known as the Father of Insurance Science in Iran, was the author and translator of dozens of insurance-related books and the founder of several insurance companies.
- Omid Kordestani, senior vice president of worldwide sales and field operations, Google
- Farinaz Koushanfar, Henry Booker Professor of Electrical and Computer Engineering, UC San Diego (UCSD); Director of the Center for Machine Intelligence and Security (MICS) at UCSD

== L ==
- Caro Lucas, scientist; professor and founding director of the Center of Excellence for Control and Intelligent Processing (CIPCE), School of Electrical and Computer Engineering, University of Tehran; researcher at the School of Cognitive Sciences (SCS), Institute for Studies in Theoretical Physics and Mathematics (IPM), Tehran

== M ==
- Esfandiar Maasoumi, Fellow of the Royal Statistical Society, Southern Methodist University
- Iraj Malekpour, professor of space physics
- Abbas Milani, director of Iranian Studies Program, Stanford University
- Farzaneh Milani, director of studies in women and gender, University of Virginia
- Maryam Mirzakhani, mathematician and a professor of mathematics at Stanford University, and first woman ever to be awarded the Fields Medal
- Minoo Mohraz, physician, researcher, infectious diseases specialist, AIDS specialist, professor at the Tehran University of Medical Sciences.
- Parviz Moin, Franklin P. and Caroline M. Johnson Professor of Mechanical Engineering, Stanford University
- Ali Montazeri, public health scientist at the Health Metrics Research Center of the Iranian Institute for Health Sciences Research
- Mohsen Mostafavi, dean of Cornell University College of Architecture, Art, and Planning
- Fathollah Moztarzadeh, Biomedical Engineering, Order of Research, professor at Amirkabir University of Technology.
- Hamid Mowlana, director of the Division of International Communication at American University in Washington D.C., and former president of the International Association for Media and Communication Research

== N ==
- Firouz Naderi, associate director, Project Formulation and Strategy, Jet Propulsion Laboratory, NASA
- Hossein Nasr, philosopher, George Washington University
- Farzad Nazem, former chief technical officer and executive vice president, Yahoo!
- Camran Nezhat, director of Stanford Endoscopy Center for Training & Technology, Stanford University

== O ==
- Pierre Omidyar, founder of eBay

== P ==
- Kaveh Pahlavan, professor and director of CWINS, Worcester Polytechnic Institute
- Hashem Pesaran, fellow of Trinity College, Fellow of The British Academy, former director of the Applied Econometrics Program at UCLA, founding editor of the Journal of Applied Econometrics, Cambridge University

== R ==
- Ali R. Rabi, founding chair of the Middle East Citizens Assembly, University of Maryland
- Yahya Rahmat-Samii, professor of Electrical Engineering, University of California Los Angeles
- Behzad Razavi, director, Communication Circuits Laboratory, UCLA
- Sohrab Rohani, chair, Department of Chemical and Biochemical Engineering, University of Western Ontario
- Mostafa Ronaghi, chief technology officer and senior vice president of Illumina

== S ==
- Pardis Sabeti, geneticist, assistant professor, Center for Systems Biology and Department of Organismic and Evolutionary Biology, Harvard University
- Sajjad Sadeghi, Founder of the Iranian theory of the Neo Cold War.
- Hossein Sadri, dean, associate professor of architectural theory, Girne American University
- Reihaneh Safavi-Naini, cryptographer, professor in School of Computer Science, University of Wollongong
- Muhammad Sahimi, chair of Chemical Engineering Department, University of Southern California
- Farrokh Saidi, medical professor and administrator, permanent member of Iranian Academy of Medical Sciences
- Jawad Salehi, inventor of optical code division multiple access, professor of electrical engineering at Sharif University of Technology
- Majid Samii, neurosurgeon and scientist, president of the International Society for Neurosurgery
- Kamal Sarabandi, professor of Electrical Engineering, University of Michigan
- Mohammad-Nabi Sarbolouki, professor of macromolecular physical chemistry, Tehran University
- Cyrus Shahabi, chair of the Computer Science Department, University of Southern California
- Alireza Shapour Shahbazi, lecturer in Achaemenid archeology and Iranology at Harvard University; full professor of history in Eastern Oregon University, Eastern Oregon University
- Mohammad Shahidehpour, former dean of the Graduate College and Associate VP for Research, Illinois Institute of Technology
- Freidoon Shahidi, university research professor, Memorial University of Newfoundland
- Manuchehr Shahrokhi, Craig Fellow/professor, editor of the Global Finance Journal, California State University, Fresno
- Vahid Shams Kolahi, solid-state physicist with contribution to CIGS and CdTe solar cells
- Amir Ali Sheibany, professor of geology, University of Tehran; founder and chairman of the National Iranian Steel Corporation (ZobAhan AryaMehr)
- Saeed Shirkavand, former vice minister in Ministry of Economic Affairs and Finance (Iran), assistant professor in management faculty of University of Tehran
- Hamid Shirvani, president and professor of art and architecture, Briar Cliff University
- Amin Shokrollahi, professor of I&C faculty and the head of ALGO lab, EPFL, Switzerland
- Gholam Reza Sinambari, chair of Department of Environmental Engineering, Fachhochschule Bingen
- Hamid Soltanian-Zadeh, senior scientist, Henry Ford Health System; professor of electrical and computer engineering, University of Tehran
- Saba Soomekh, professor of religious studies and Middle Eastern history at UCLA, and author of books and articles on contemporary and historical Iranian Jewish culture
- Abdolkarim Soroush, philosopher
- Kamran Talattof, professor, University of Arizona
- Vahid Tarokh, professor, Harvard University

== V ==
- Cumrun Vafa, physicist, Harvard University
- Saba Valadkhan, biomedical scientist; assistant professor and RNA researcher at Case Western Reserve University

== Y ==
- Alireza Yaghoubi, materials scientist, designer and entrepreneur
- Ehsan Yarshater, distinguished professor, Columbia University
- Hajar Yazdiha, German born Iranian-American Sociologist focusing on ethno-racial studies
- Houman Younessi, professor, assistant dean of academics, Rensselaer Polytechnic Institute – Hartford Graduate Campus; director of Rensselaer Initiative in Systems Engineering (RISE)

== Z ==
- Lotfi A. Zadeh, creator of fuzzy logic and fuzzy set, UC Berkeley
- Mehdi Zakerian, visiting professor, Penn Law, University of Pennsylvania, president of Iranian International Studies Association (IISA), editor-in-chief of International Studies Journal
- Esmail Zanjani, department chair of Department of Animal Biotechnology at University of Nevada, Reno
- Abdolhossein Zarrinkoob, scholar of Iranian literature, history of literature, Persian culture and history, professor at Tehran University

== See also ==
- List of Iranian scientists from the pre-modern era
- List of Iranian mathematicians
- Science and technology in Iran
- List of universities in Iran
- Higher education in Iran
- List of Iranian Research Centers
- International rankings of Iran in science and technology
- Brain drain in Iran, the world's highest in 2006
