= Harbour.Space Institute =

Private Institute

Coordinates: 41.39057°N 2.19675°E

Harbour.Space Institute of Technology
- Type: Private Institute
- Established: December 15, 2015
- Founders: Svetlana Velikanova, Ingo Beyer von Morgenstern
- Academic affiliations: University of the Thai Chamber of Commerce, Moscow Institute of Physics and Technology, University of Vic - Central University of Catalonia
- Chairman: Ingo Beyer von Morgenstern
- Chairperson: Kamran Elahian
- Academic staff: 350
- Total staff: 50
- Students: 850
- Location: Carrer de Rosa Sensat 9-11 Barcelona, Spain. | อาคาร 10 ชั้น 6 126/1 Hokankha Alley, แขวงรัชดาภิเษก Din Daeng, Bangkok, Thailand., Barcelona - Bangkok, 08005, Spain - Thailand
- Campus: Urban
- Language: English
- Colors: HSU Purple and White
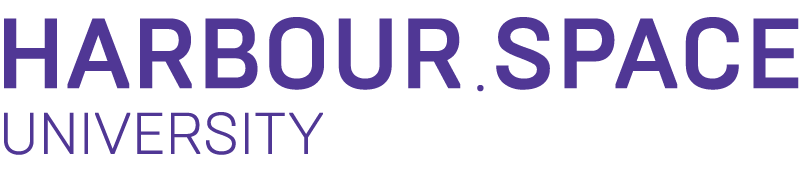

Harbour.Space Institute of Technology, also known as Harbour.Space, is an unaccredited private for-profit university for technology, entrepreneurship, and design, with campuses in Barcelona, Spain and Bangkok, Thailand. Harbour.Space offers foundation, bachelor's, and master's degrees in technical and non-technical programs as well as short courses.

== History ==
Harbour.Space Institute of Technology was founded in 2015 by Svetlana Velikanova and Ingo Beyer von Morgenstern, with its first campus in Barcelona, Spain. Upon opening in September 2016 at the OneOcean Port Vell, the university accepted 30 students from 11 countries. The current Harbour.Space Barcelona campus is located in Carrer Rosa Sensat 9-11.

In August 2016, Harbour.Space signed an agreement of collaboration with the Moscow Institute of Physics and Technology, to develop academic exchange programs for students and staff.

Also in 2016, Harbour.Space began a collaboration with Barcelona Activa to organise international programming bootcamps and public lectures.

In 2017, Harbour.Space announced a collaboration with the programming platform Codeforces.

In February 2019, Harbour.Space and the University of the Thai Chamber of Commerce signed an agreement to open Harbour.Space@UTCC, the institute's Bangkok-based second campus. UTCC has a student base of 20,000 students on campus and an affiliation with the Thai Chamber of Commerce. In December 2022, Harbour.Space @UTCC has been approved as one of the four programs to be piloted under the Higher Education Sandbox led by Ministry of Higher Education, Science, Research and Innovation (TISTR) of Thailand.

In 2023, Harbour.Space signed a partnership agreement with the University of Vic - Central University of Catalonia, enabling students to earn a double degree and accreditation in creative programs such as Digital Marketing, High-tech Entrepreneurship, Interaction Design, and Product Management.

In 2025, Harbour.Space announced its transition from university to Harbour.Space Institute of Technology, a move aimed at enhancing global accreditation and focusing on technology, entrepreneurship, and design.

== Campuses ==
Harbour.Space Barcelona opened its doors in September 2016, in OneOcean Port Vell. The institute remained and operated from the marina until 2018 when it moved to its current location in Port Olimpic near the 22@ Innovation District of Barcelona.

Harbour.Space@UTCC launched in January 2020 on UTCC's premises, with bachelor's and master's programs in High-tech Entrepreneurship, Interaction Design, Computer Science, Data Science and Digital Marketing.

== Academics ==
Harbour.Space institute offers both bachelor's and master's degrees. Its programs are:

- Computer Science
- Data Science
- Cyber Security
- Interaction Design
- Digital Marketing
- Fintech
- Front-end Development
- Math as a Second Language
- High-tech Entrepreneurship
- Product Management

Harbour.Space's programs are taught in English to up to 200 undergraduate, graduate and professional students per year. The Harbour.Space faculty is composed of professionals in their disciplines and instructors with current careers in the technology industry from around the world. Founding instructors include entrepreneur Kamran Elahian, chairman of venture capital firm Global Catalyst Partners.

=== Teaching methods ===
Programs at Harbour.Space run for an entire calendar year divided into fifteen 3-week modules. Its teaching methodology includes project-based learning, interactive and collaborative approaches, industry integration, technology-enhanced learning, and personalized learning.

=== Scholarships ===
The institute offers scholarship opportunities; Merit-based, women in technology, graduate teaching assistantships and competitive programming. These scholarships are available for the institute's Bangkok and Barcelona campuses.

== Achievements ==
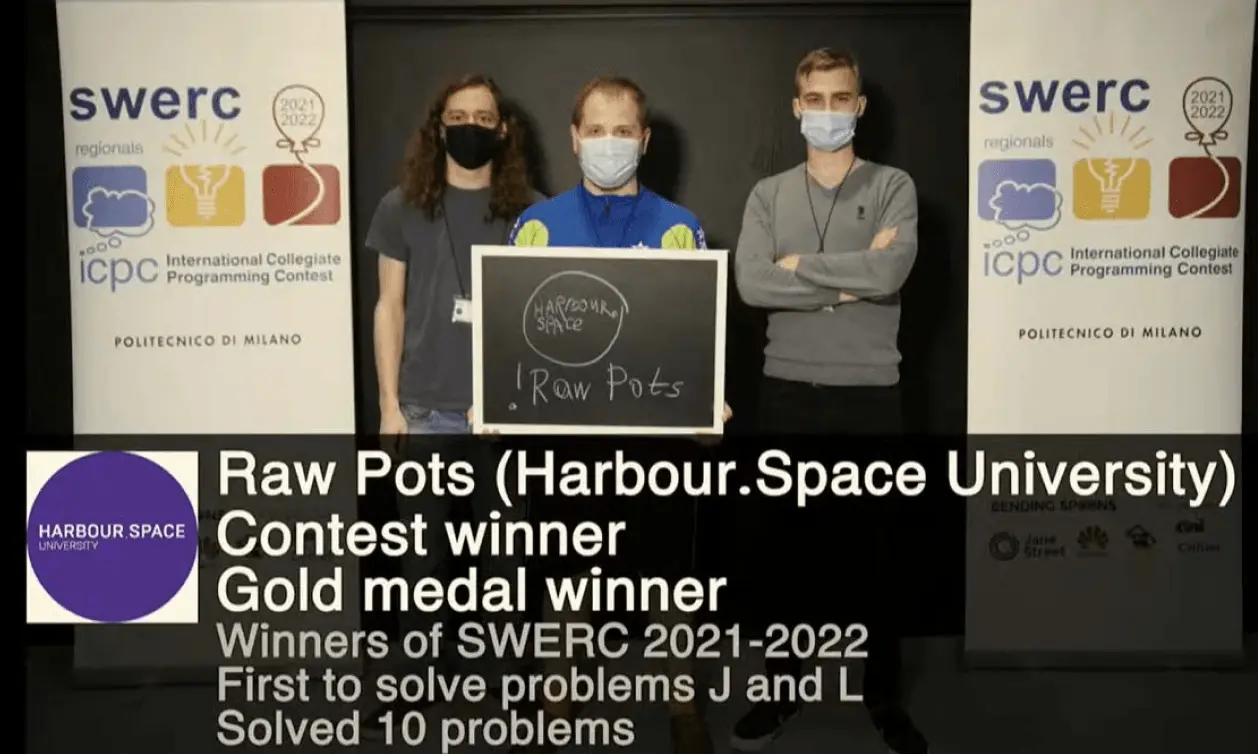
Harbour.Space students and SWERC winners: Marco Meijer, Danil Zashikhin and Maksym Oboznyi

=== Gold medalists at SWERC ===
In 2021 the Harbour.Space team RAW POTS, composed of Maksym Oboznyi from Ukraine, Marco Meijer from the Netherlands, and Danil Zashikhin from Russia, won the gold medal at the SWERC against the top competitors from Southwestern Europe. The Southwestern Europe Regional Contest, also known as SWERC, is the south-western Europe selection of the International Collegiate Programming Contest. Teams of three students compete in a 5-hour-long contest where they have to solve algorithmic problems and do practical coding.

=== Gold medalists and European champions at ICPC ===
During the 46th and 47th ICPC World Finals in April 2024, held concurrently in Luxor, Egypt, the Harbour.Space team P+P+P clinched a gold medal, securing their position as 4th Worldwide and European champions for the year. Hosted by the Arab Academy of Science, Technology, and Maritime Transports, the competition witnessed participation from over 840 contestants representing more than 50 nations and over 170 universities.

== Events and projects ==
=== Hello Programming Bootcamp ===
In 2017, Harbour.Space collaborated with Moscow Workshops and Codeforces to organise the Hello Barcelona Programming Bootcamp, the first edition in the series of bootcamps to prepare participants for the Intercollegiate Programming Competition World Finals. As of 2020, the Bootcamp series has continued, realising 5 bootcamps in total in Spain, India, and Oman. The latest edition was scheduled to take place in Muscat, Oman, but was postponed due to the outbreak of COVID-19.

=== Tech Scouts ===
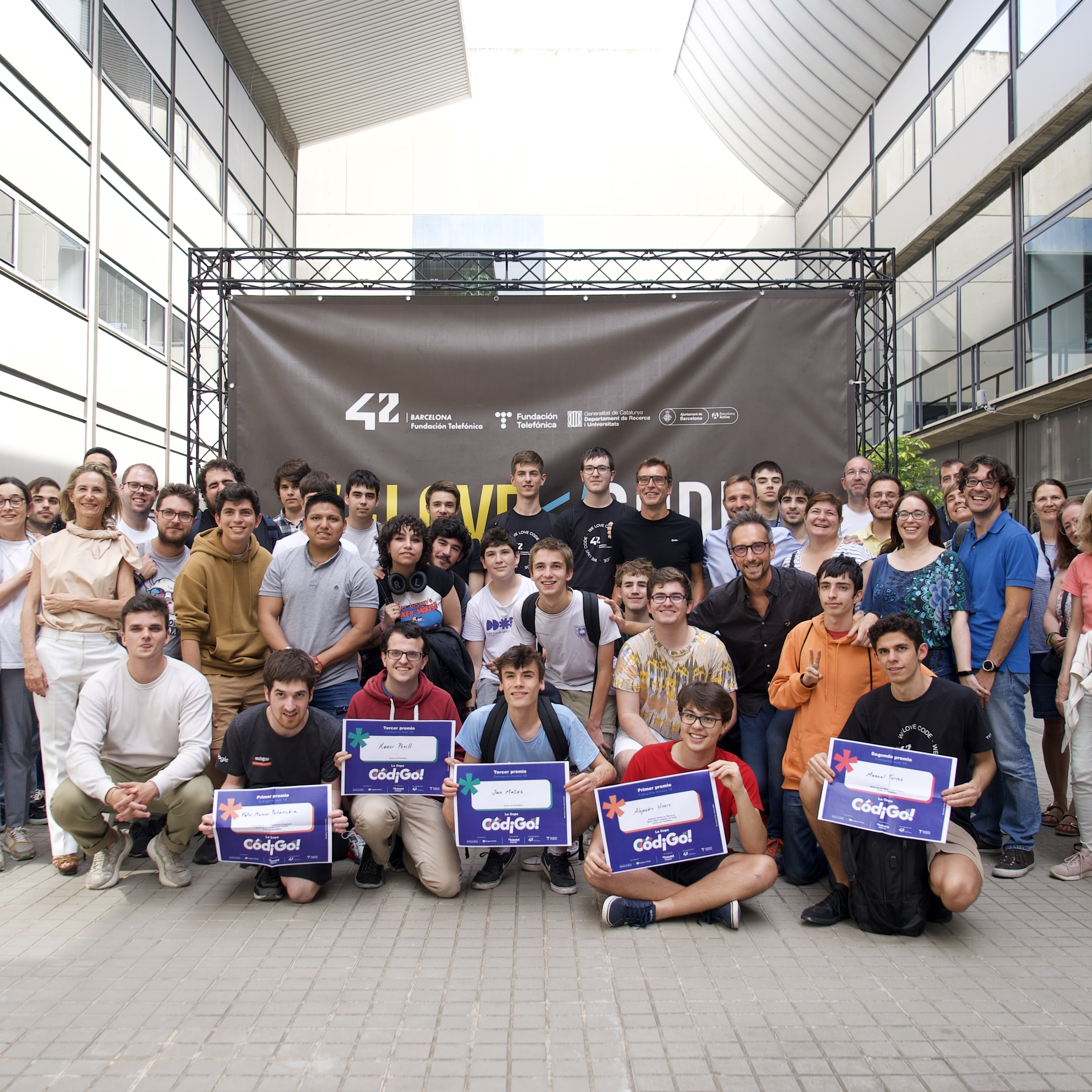
Leagues of Code Competition

In July 2018, Harbour.Space organised the first Tech Scouts, an 11-day summer camp for kids 12-18 with the objective of introducing them to design, computer science, and entrepreneurship. The camp had 62 participants. In July 2019, the university organised the second edition of the summer camp. The camp had 71 participants. The third edition of Tech Scouts was scheduled for July 2020 but was postponed because of the outbreak of COVID-19.

== Criticism and Controversies ==
Harbour.Space Institute of Technology has faced criticism for its unaccredited status, leading to questions about the validity of its degrees. There have also been concerns regarding the high tuition fees and the return on investment for graduates. Additionally, some former students have reported dissatisfaction with the quality of education and the lack of support from the administration.
