= List of Iranian mathematicians =

The following is a list of Iranian mathematicians including ethnic Iranian mathematicians.

== A ==
- Abhari (?–1262/1265)
- Abu Nasr-e Mansur (c. 960–1036)
- Abū Ja'far al-Khāzin (900–971), mathematician and astronomer
- Abu al-Wafa' Buzjani (940–998), mathematician
- Abu al-Jud (possibly died 1014/15)
- Abu al-Hasan al-Ahwazi, 10th-11th century mathematician and astronomer

== B ==
- Bahai, Sheikh (1547–1621), poet, mathematician, astronomer, engineer, designer, faghih (religious scientist), and architect
- Abu Ma'shar al-Balkhi (787–886), known in Latin as Albumasar
- Abu Zayd al-Balkhi (850–934), geographer and mathematician
- Al-Biruni (973–1048), astronomer and mathematician
- Sahl ibn Bishr (c. 786–845?), astrologer, mathematician
- al-Birjandi (?–1528), astronomer and mathematician
- Caucher Birkar (1978- ), Kurdish-Iranian mathematician, 2018 Fields medalist

== C ==
- Rama Cont, Professor of Mathematics at University of Oxford, recipient of the Louis Bachelier Prize of the French Academy of Sciences (2010)

== D ==
- Abu Hanifa Dinawari (815–896), astronomer, agriculturist, botanist, metallurgist, geographer, mathematician, and historian

== E ==
- Abbas Edalat, Professor of Computer Science and Mathematics, Imperial College London

== F ==
- Kamāl al-Dīn al-Fārisī (1267–1319)
- Fazari, Ibrahim (?–777), mathematician and astronomer
- Fazari, Mohammad (?–796), mathematician and astronomer
- Soheila Feyzbakhsh, mathematician

== G ==
- Kushyar Gilani (971–1029), mathematician, geographer, astronomer
- Abu Said Gorgani (9th century), astronomer and mathematician

== H ==
- Habash al-Hasib al-Marwazi, mathematician, astronomer, geographer
- Ayn al-Quzat Hamadani, jurisconsult, mystic, philosopher, poet and mathematician

== I ==
- Isfahani Abol-fath (10th century)
- Al-Isfizari (11th-12th century), mathematician and astronomer

== J ==
- Al-Abbās ibn Said al-Jawharī (800-860), geometer

== K ==
- Karaji (953–1029)
- Jamshid-i Kashani (c. 1380–1429), astronomer and mathematician
- Khayyam, Omar (1048–1131), poet, mathematician, and astronomer
- Al-Kharaqī, astronomer and mathematician
- Khujandi (c. 940–c. 1000), mathematician and astronomer
- Muhammad ibn Musa al-Khwarizmi (a.k.a. Al-Khwarazmi, c. 780–c. 850), creator of algorithm and algebra, mathematician and astronomer
- Najm al-Dīn al-Qazwīnī al-Kātibī, logician and philosopher
- Abū Sahl al-Qūhī, mathematician and astronomer
- Abu Ishaq al-Kubunani (d. after 1481), mathematician, astronomer

== M ==
- Esfandiar Maasoumi, Fellow of the Royal Statistical Society, Southern Methodist University
- Mahani (9th century), mathematician and astronomer
- Maryam Mirzakhani (1977–2017) Professor of Mathematics, Stanford University; first woman recipient of the Fields Medal (2014)
- Muhammad Baqir Yazdi (17th century), found the pair of amicable numbers 9,363,584 and 9,437,056

== N ==
- Nasir Khusraw (1004–1088), scientist, Ismaili scholar, mathematician, philosopher, traveler and poet
- Nasavi (c. 1010–c. 1075)
- Nizam al-Din Nishapuri, mathematician, astronomer, jurist, exegete, and poet
- Nayrizi (865–1022), mathematician and astronomer

== Q ==
- Ali Qushji (1403 – 16 December 1474), mathematician, astronomer and physician

== S ==
- Samarqandi, Ashraf (c. 1250–c. 1310), mathematician, astronomer
- Ibn Sahl, mathematician, physicist
- Freydoon Shahidi, Distinguished Professor of Mathematics, Purdue University
- Sijzi (c. 945–c. 1020), mathematician, astronomer and astrologer
- Zayn al-Din Omar Savaji, philosopher and logician
- M. Vali Siadat, Distinguished Professor of Mathematics, University of Illinois at Chicago

== T ==
- Ramin Takloo-Bighash (born 1974), number theorist, University of Illinois at Chicago
- Tusi, Nasireddin (1201–1274), Persian polymath, architect, philosopher, physician, scientist, and theologian
- Tusi, Sharafeddin (?–1213/4)

== Y ==
- Yaʿqūb ibn Ṭāriq (?–796), mathematician and astronomer
- Nazif ibn Yumn (?–990), mathematician

== Z ==
- Zarir Jurjani (9th century), mathematician and astronomer
