= Sajjad =

Sajjad/ Sjjad
- Pronunciation: Arabic: [saʤaːd]
- Gender: Male

Origin
- Meaning: Kneeling in prayer
- Region of origin: Arabia

Other names
- Related names: Sajjad/ Sjjad

Sajjad/ Sjjad سَجَّاد is a given name and a surname derived 'to bow down (before God)', shared with the Arabic word مسجد masjid 'mosque'.

Notable people with the name include:

== Given name ==
- Imam Sajjad (Ali ibn Husayn Zayn al-Abidin) (658–712), 4th Imam of Shia Islam
- Syed Sajjad Haider Yaldram (1880–1943), Urdu short story writer, travel writer, translator, linguist, essayist, and humorist
- Sajjad Akbar (1961–2024), Pakistani cricketer
- Sajjad Ali (born 1966), Pakistani semi-classical, pop singer, film actor, director and producer
- Sajjad Anoushiravani (born 1984), Iranian weightlifter
- Sajjad Fazel (born 1991), Tanzanian clinical pharmacist, public health researcher, health columnist
- Sajjad Ganjzadeh (born 1992), Iranian karateka
- Sajjad Gul, Pakistani film producer, media mogul
- Sajad Haider (1932–2025), Pakistani fighter pilot
- Sajjad Hussain (cricketer, born 1980) (born 1980), Indian cricketer
- Sajjad Hussain (cricketer, born 1986) (born 1986), Pakistani cricketer
- Sajjad Hussain (composer) (1917–1995), Indian music director
- Sajjad Karim (born 1970), British Asian politician
- Sajjad Gharibi (born 1991), Iranian bodybuilder
- Sajjad Ghani Lone (born 1967), Indian Kashmiri politician, and former Member of the Legislative Assembly
- Sajjad Mardani (born 1988), Iranian taekwondo player
- Sajjad Haider Nadeem (born 1957), Pakistani politician, member of the Provincial Assembly of the Punjab
- Sajjad Hussain Qureshi (1923–1998), politician, Governor of Punjab 1985–1988
- Sajjad Sadeghi (born 1983), Iranian Political Scientist and political prisoner.
- Sajjad Shar (born 1986), Secretary General of banned organization Jeay Sindh Muttahida Mahaz
- Sajjad Zaheer (1905–1973), Urdu writer, Marxist thinker and revolutionary

== Middle name ==
- Aasim Sajjad Akhtar, Pakistani professor, politician and columnist
- Aamer Sajjad (born 1981), Pakistani cricketer
- Razia Sajjad Zaheer (1918–1979), Indian writer in the Urdu language, translator

== Surname ==
- Enver Sajjad (1935–2019), Pakistani playwright and fiction writer
- Pervez Sajjad (born 1942), Pakistani cricketer
- Wasim Sajjad (born 1941), Pakistani lawyer, former President of Pakistan
