= Railway Market =

Railway Market or Train Market may refer to:

- Maeklong Railway Market, a market in Samut Songkhram Province, Thailand
- Rynek Kolejowy (lit. 'railway market'), Polish magazine on rail transport
- Talat Rotfai (lit. 'train market'), a night market in Bangkok, Thailand
