= Din Daeng district =

Din Daeng ดินแดง
- District
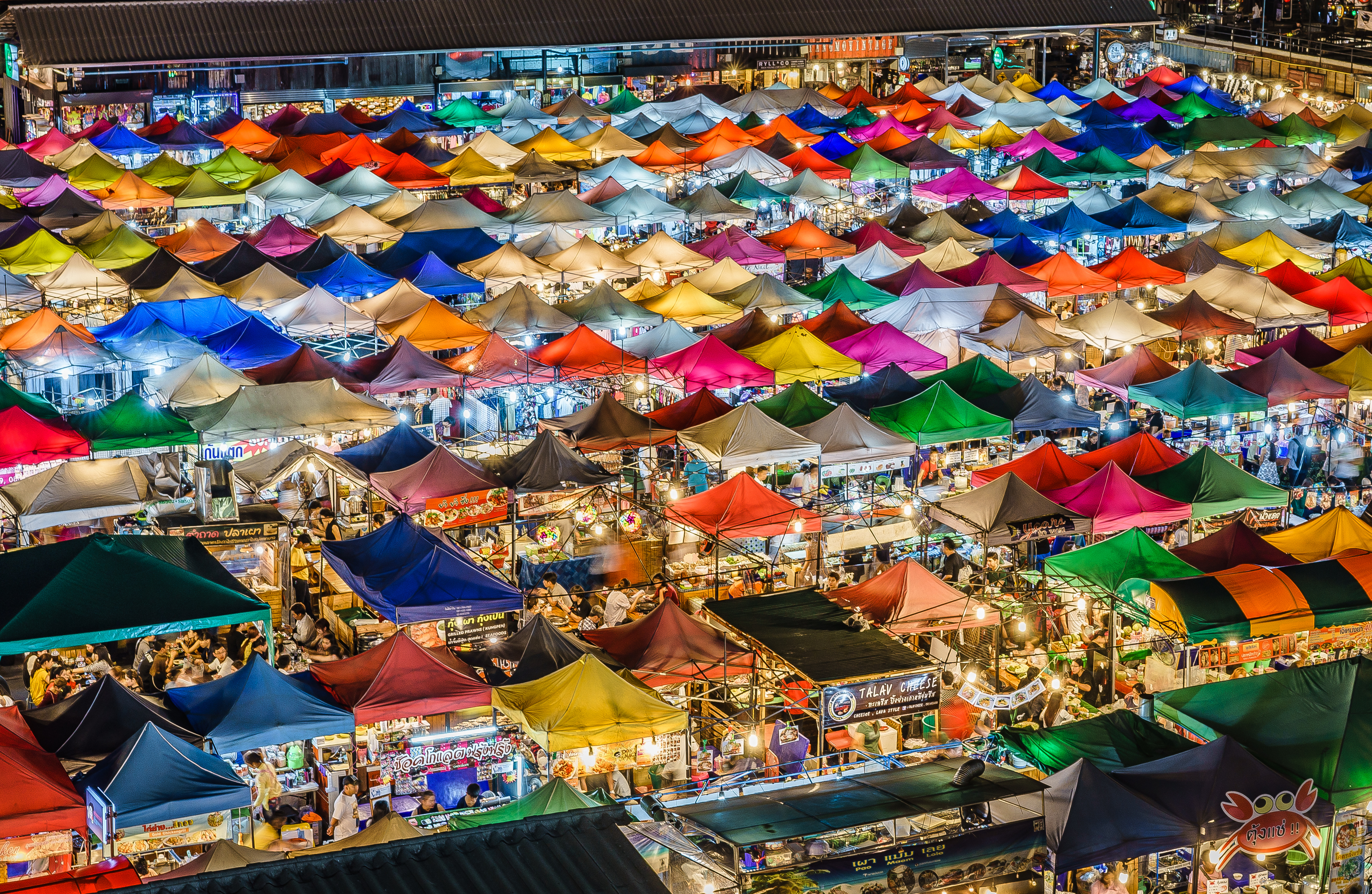
- Rot Fai Night Market (Ratchada branch)

- District location in Bangkok
- Coordinates: 13°46′11″N 100°33′10″E
- Country: Thailand
- Province: Bangkok
- Seat: Din Daeng
- Khwaeng: 2
- Khet established: 14 January 1994

Area
  - Total: 8.354 km^{2} (3.225 sq mi)

Population (2017)
  - Total: 122,563
  - Density: 14,590.83/km^{2} (37,790.1/sq mi)
- Time zone: UTC+7 (ICT)
- Postal code: 10400
- Geocode: 1026

Din Daeng (Thai: ดินแดง, pronounced [dīn dɛ̄ːŋ]) is one of the 50 districts (khet) of Bangkok, Thailand. Its neighbours, clockwise from north, are Chatuchak, Huai Khwang, Ratchathewi, and Phaya Thai.

== History ==
The district was created in 1993, when the eastern part of Phaya Thai was split off to form a new district. The district is highly populated partly due to the concentration of apartments built by National Housing Authority. They are along Din Daeng and Pracha Songkhro Roads.

Its name literally means "red soil." The name comes from a dirt road of the same name that was constructed during the government of Field Marshal P. Pibulsongkram in the 1940s, which had a distinct red colour. Locals soon began using the term Din Daeng to refer to the area. Today, it is better known as Din Daeng Road.

== Environmental ==
According to Thailand's Pollution Control Department (PCD) Din Daeng is the noisiest district in the city. It suffers from noise pollution on the order of an average daily noise level of 71.6 to 81.6 A-weighted decibels. A-weighting is commonly used for the measurement of environmental and industrial noise, as well as for assessing potential hearing damage. The safe limit is no more than 70 decibels on average in a 24-hour period. The PCD attributes the noise to vehicular traffic.

Sites in Thon Buri District and Huai Khwang District were named the second and third most noise polluted.

In 2026, Din Daeng was ranked as the least livable district among all 50 districts of Bangkok.

== Administration ==
The district is divided into two sub-districts (khwaeng).

No.	Name	Thai	Area (km^{2})	Map
1.	Din Daeng	ดินแดง	4.618	Map
2.	Ratchadaphisek	รัชดาภิเษก	3.736	Map
Total			8.354	Map

== Population ==
Din Daeng is one of the Bangkok districts with a large population of Southern Thai descendants. Their main occupation is textile manufacturing, and they supply their products to major wholesale markets such as Phahurat and Pratunam.

== Locations ==
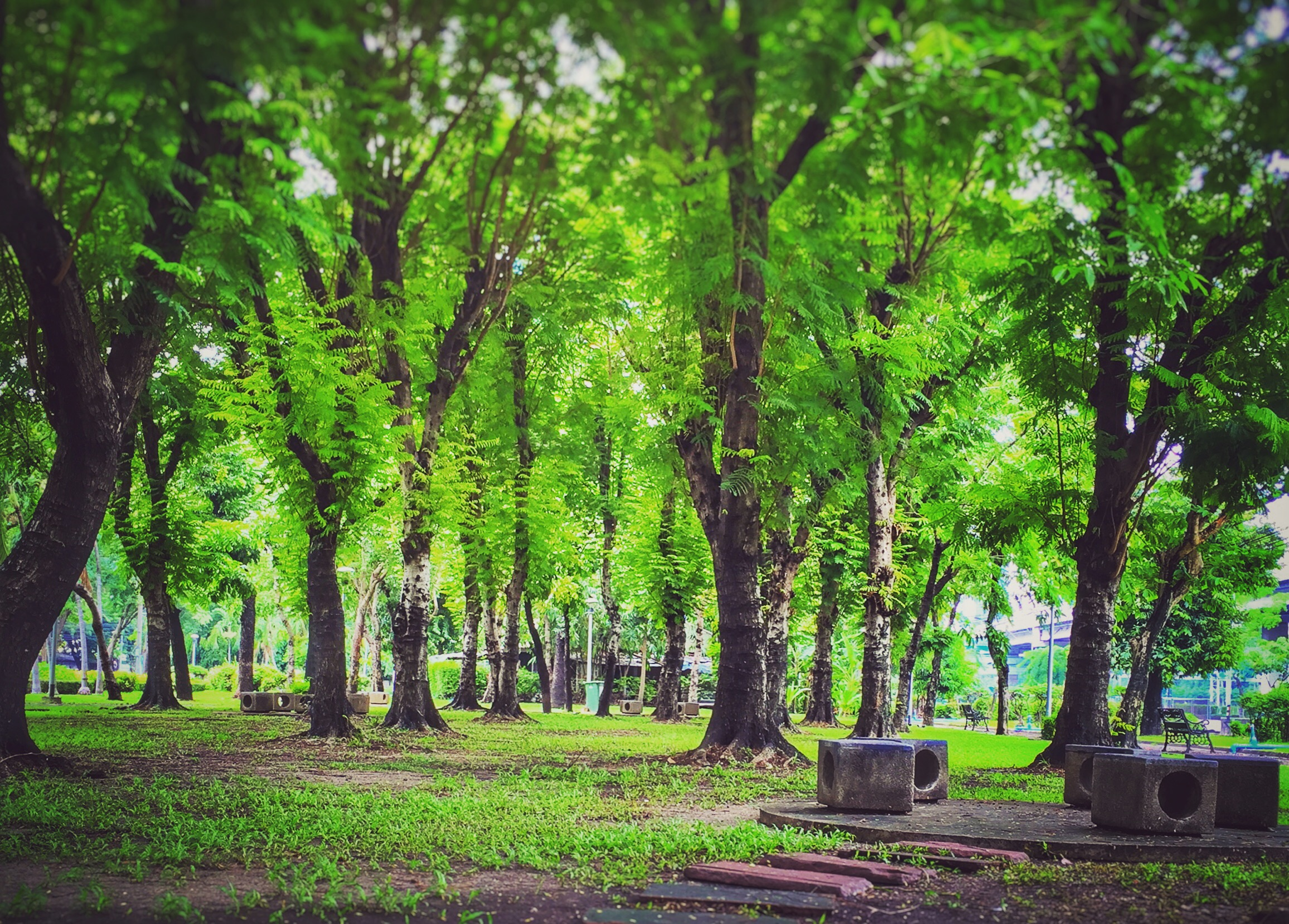
Vibhavadi Rangsit Forest Park

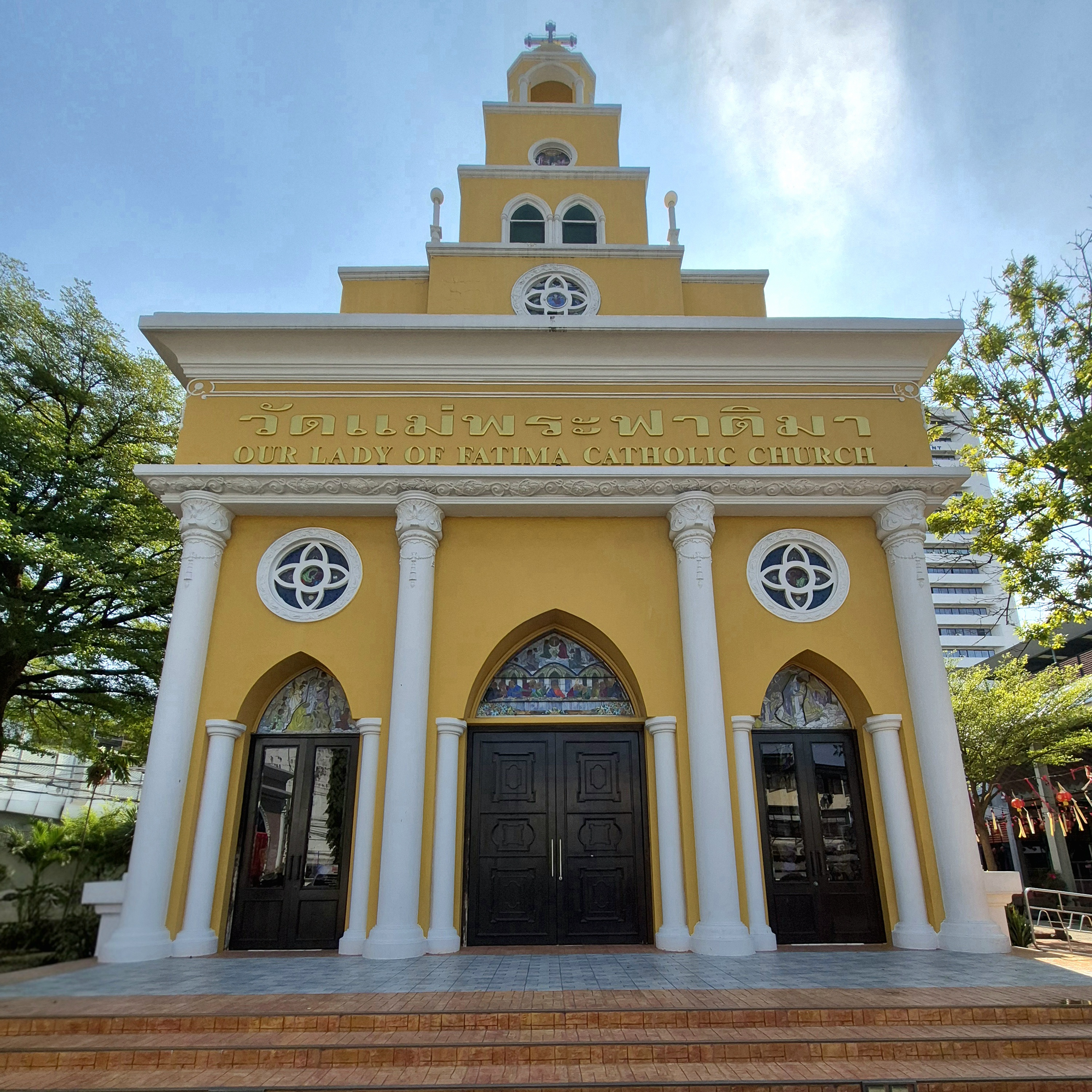
Our Lady of Fatima Catholic Church.

BMA City Hall 2 is located in the Din Daeng district of Bangkok on Mitmitree Road, near Vibhavadi Rangsit Road. The building is primarily used for offices and business purposes.

In front of BMA City Hall 2 lies Vibhavadi Rangsit Forest Park, a small, shady public park stretching along Vibhavadi Rangsit Road. The park is dog-friendly and is open daily from 8:00 a.m. to 6:00 p.m.

Not far from BMA City Hall 2 is the Thai-Japanese Stadium, a multi-purpose arena managed by BMA, located next to the Ministry of Labour.

The University of the Thai Chamber of Commerce is also located in the district, close to the Territorial Defense Command's Reserve Power Practice Task Center. Surasakmontree School is situated nearby as well.

The National Defence College of Thailand (NDC), another Thai military higher education institute, is located in the Din Daeng area.

Radio Thailand Station and the National Broadcasting Services of Thailand (NBT), along with the Stock Exchange of Thailand (SET), are all situated on Vibhavadi Rangsit Road.

Our Lady of Fatima Church, a Catholic church, is located in the district.

Din Daeng Flats are well-known low-income housing operated by the National Housing Authority.

Famous markets in the area include Rot Fai Night Market (also known as Talat Rotfai), Din Daeng Market, and Huai Khwang Market. The Esplanade is the only major shopping mall and entertainment complex in the district. Fortune Town is another leading shopping mall and hotel located on Ratchadapisek Road, opposite CentralPlaza Grand Rama IX in the neighboring Huai Khwang district.

=== Diplomatic mission ===
- Embassy of China

== Transportation ==
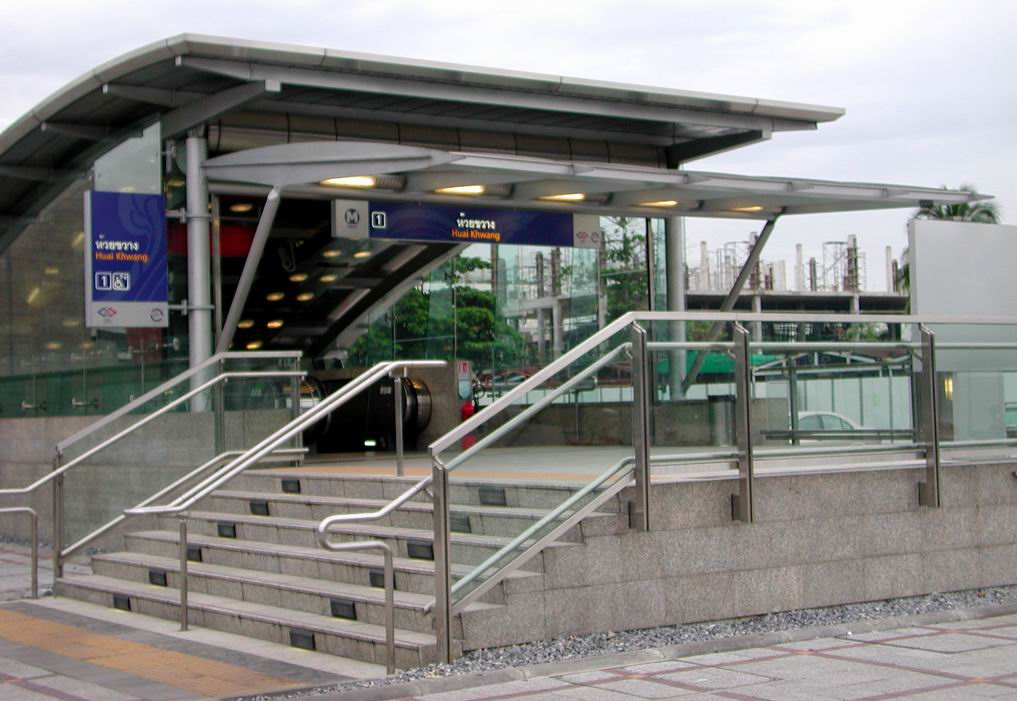
Entrance to Huai Khwang Station

The MRT passes along Din Daeng's eastern border (touching Huai Khwang) with five stations: Phra Ram 9, Thailand Cultural Centre, Huai Khwang, Sutthisan, and Ratchadaphisek.

== Politics ==
The area had long been a political stronghold of Anong Phetthat, who served as a Bangkok Metropolitan Council (BMC) member for four consecutive terms spanning more than 20 years. During that time, she represented Thai Rak Thai and its successor parties, including the People's Power Party and Pheu Thai. However, in the BMC election held on 28 June 2026, held alongside the Bangkok gubernatorial election, she ran as an independent candidate. However, she was defeated by Amarin Sawatsayanuphap of the People's Party, who won the seat.
