= Kodchakorn Songsaengterm =

Thai actress

- กชกร ส่งแสงเติม
- Born: Kodchakorn Songsaengterm; August 21, 1994 (age 32); Bangkok, Thailand
- Other name: Gookgiik (กุ๊กกิ๊ก)
- Education: University of the Thai Chamber of Commerce (Faculty of Communication Arts)
- Occupations: Actress; model; MC; YouTubers
- Years active: 2011–present
- Agent: Channel 7 (2011–present)
- Notable work: Jao ying Tang On (2012); Kue Huttha Krong Pipob (2013); Hua Jai Teuan (2014); Kerd Pen Ka (2016–17)

Kodchakorn Songsaengterm (Thai: กชกร ส่งแสงเติม; nickname: Gookgiik; กุ๊กกิ๊ก) is a Thai actress under Channel 7.

== Biography ==
Songsaengterm was born in Bangkok on August 21, 1992. She entered the showbiz after entering the Dream Star Search 2010 contest and received first runner-up.

Her role is known as a protagonist in Thai folklore dramas such as Krai Thong, Jao ying Tang On, Uttai Tawee, including baddie role or supporting actress in other genres. Songsaengterm had her first acting role in 2011 on Channel 7 to date.

She graduated from Sainampeung Under the Royal Patronage of Princess Petcharat Rajsuda Sirisopaphannawadee School, Khlong Toei and graduated with a bachelor's degree from the Faculty of Communication Arts, University of the Thai Chamber of Commerce.

== Television Presenter (MC) ==
=== Television ===
- 20 : ทุกวัน เวลา น.-น. On Air () ร่วมกับ

=== Online ===
- 2021 : GG CHANNEL EP.1 On Air YouTuber:GG Channel Gookgiik
