= Ratchadaphisek Subdistrict =

Ratchadaphisek รัชดาภิเษก
- Khwaeng
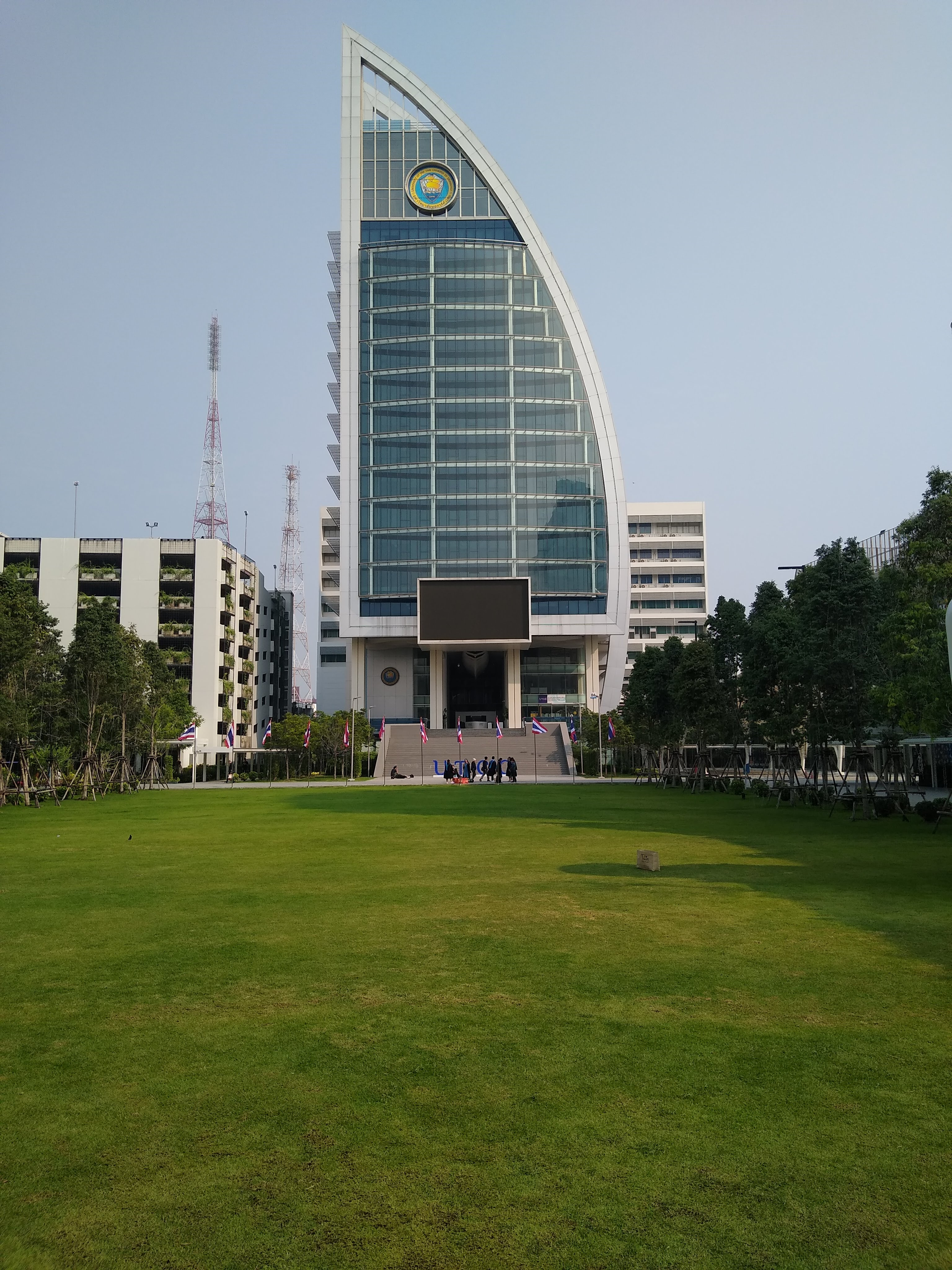
- University of the Thai Chamber of Commerce

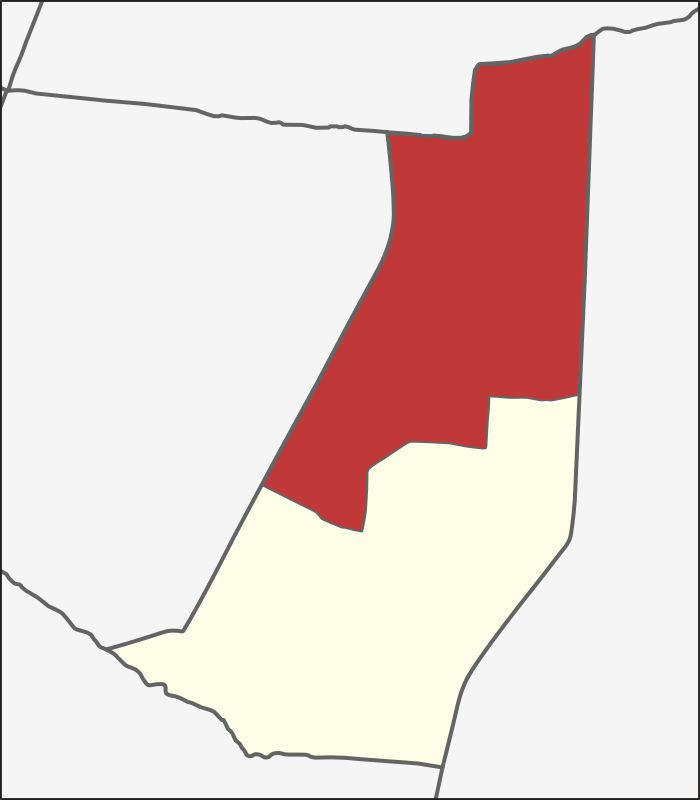
- Location in Din Daeng District
- Country: Thailand
- Province: Bangkok
- Khet: Din Daeng

Area
  - Total: 3.736 km^{2} (1.442 sq mi)

Population (2023)
  - Total: 41,551
- Time zone: UTC+7 (ICT)

Ratchadaphisek (Thai: รัชดาภิเษก, pronounced [rát.t͡ɕʰa.daː.pʰí.sèk]) is one of the khwaeng in Din Daeng District, Bangkok. In 2023, it had a population of 41,551
