= Akbar Adibi =

Iranian engineer (1939–2000)

- Born: February 12, 1939; Songhor, Iran
- Died: August 26, 2000 (aged 61); Tehran, Iran
- Education: Tehran University; University of California, Santa Barbara
- Known for: Creating Iran's first solar cell Father of Electronics and VLSI in Iran
- Scientific career
- Fields: Solid State Electronic engineering, VLSI
- Workplaces: Amirkabir University of Technology
- Doctoral advisor: Phillip F. Ordung

Akbar Adibi (Persian: اکبر ادیبی Akbar Adībī) (1939–2000) was an Iranian electronic engineer, VLSI researcher, and university engineering professor.

== Biography ==
Akbar Adibi was born on February 12, 1939, in the city of Songhor, in North East province of Kermanshah in Iran. He received his Master of Science degree in Electrical Engineering Department from Tehran University in 1965 and he was offered a position as a university instructor at the Tehran Polytechnic (Amirkabir University of Technology). In 1965–66, he worked for the Alstom Power Plant, in Tehran, Iran, In 1966–73, he served as an instructor at the Tehran Polytechnic, Tehran, Iran.

Professor Akbar Adibi continued his studies at the University of California, Santa Barbara (UCSB) in 1973, where he achieved two Master of Science degrees, the first degree in Microprocessor-based Computer Systems and the second degree in Solid State and Semiconductor Devices in 1975. He completed his PhD degree, in 1977, and his dissertation title was Schottky Barrier Solar Cells.

Akbar Adibi's academic career started at Tehran Polytechnic University of Technology (which later changed name to Amirkabir University of Technology)Tehran Polytechnic, as an assistant professor and as a senior researcher at the Material and Energy Research Center (MERC) in Tehran.

His notable achievements are: The creation of Iran's first Solar Cell in 1978, creation of Amirkabir University's Graduate Studies in 1984, supervising Hassan Kaatuzian, who became Iran's first Ph.D. graduated in electronics in 1994, publishing more than 100 internal and international publications, earning the title of Full Professor in year 1995, earning the respected Kharazmi National Prize for his contribution as one of the best projects in 1995, earning the respected title of "The Most Recognized and Elite University Professor of Iran" in 1996, where he was awarded a prize from the hand of the President of Islamic Republic of Iran in 1996, becoming a senior member of IEEE in 1996, and earning the respected title of "The Father of Electronics and VLSI in Iran" by the Iranian academia and the media.

He was a member of numerous academic societies, including; the New York Academy of Sciences, New York Planetary Society, Optical Society of America, and Iran's IEEE Student Branch Counselor. He was involved in many industry-based projects, namely; the design and implementation of a 32 channel PCM system (in cooperation with the Iranian Communication Research Center "ICRC"), the design and construction of a DSP-based high voltage network protection system (in cooperation with Tavanir research and technology center), and the design of a DCS-based control system (in cooperation with Bethat Power Plant).

Adibi is the author of several technical books (Pulse Techniques, published by Amirkabir University of Technology, Tehran Iran, 1987; Theory and Technology of Semiconductor Devices, published by Amirkabir University of Technology, Tehran Iran, 1995; Digital Electronics published by Amirkabir University of Technology, Tehran Iran) and he translated the book Underground Excavations in Rock, by Hook & Brown, from English to Persian

He truly believed that electronics and VLSI technology could help Iran lower its dependency on oil, through which Iran would be able to join the frontier of high tech exporters. His wish was never fully realized as he was never granted the entire budget needed to create Iran's first operational VLSI lab.

His career continued until his final moment of life on August 26, 2000, at 6:30 p.m. local time due to heart failure.

Currently an auditorium in the Electrical and Computer Engineering Department of Amirkabir University of Technology is named after him.

He is survived by his two children; Sasan Adibi and Mahsa Adibi and his wife; Shahla Ejtemai Adibi.

== Selected publications ==
- P. F. Ordung, A. Adibi, D. Heald, R. Neville, J. Skalnik, "A collection-velocity model for predicting efficiency of Schottky barrier solar cells", Photovoltaic Solar Energy Conference, Luxembourg, September 27–30, 1977, p. 340-349
- A. Adibi and K. Eshraghian, "Generalized-model for GaAs-MESFET Photodetectors," IEE Proceedings-G Circuits Devices and Systems, Vol. 136, No. 6, pp. 337–343 (1989).
- M. J. Sharifi and A. Adibi, "A new method for quantum device simulation," International Journal of Electronics, Vol. 86, No. 9, pp. 1051–1062 (1999)
- M. A. Jafarizadeh, A. Adibi, and A. Rostami, "Solution of quantized optical parametric interaction Hamiltonian," Nuovo Cimento D, Vol. 20, No. 10, pp. 1459–1468 (1998).
- S. Ardalan and A. Adibi, "Design, simulation and synthesis of a 32-bit math-processor," IEEE 48th Midwest Symposium on Circuits and Systems, 2005, Vol. 2, 7-10 Aug. 2005, pp. 1469–1472 (2005).

== Adibi videos ==
- Adibi interview part 1 on YouTube
- Adibi interview part 2 on YouTube
- Adibi interview part 3 on YouTube
- Adibi interview part 4 on YouTube
- Adibi interview part 5 on YouTube
- Adibi interview part 6 on YouTube
- Adibi interview part 7 on YouTube
- Adibi interview part 8 on YouTube
- Adibi interview part 9 on YouTube
- Adibi interview part 10 on YouTube
- Commemorating Adibi's 11th anniversary of his passing away on YouTube

== See also ==
- Modern Iranian scientists, scholars, and engineers
- Amirkabir University of Technology
- Tehran Polytechnic
- University of Tehran
