= Naiyarat Thanawaigoses =

Thai YouTuber

- Zbingz Logo
- Born: 17 September 1991 (age 35); Bangkok, Thailand
- Occupation: YouTuber
- Spouse: Tharit Leelanukul (m. 2025)

YouTube information
- Years active: 2014–present
- Genres: Video game livestreaming; comedy; vlog; livestreaming; voice actress
- Subscribers: 22 million
- Views: 13 billion
- Last updated: 19 September 2026

Naiyarat Thanawaigoses (Thai: นัยรัตน์ ธนไวทย์โกเศส), nicknamed Pang (แป้ง; born September 17, 1991), is a Thai YouTuber, known for video game live streaming on her YouTube channel, zbing z. She began making videos in 2014, and has since become one of the most popular live streamers in Thailand, with over 20 million subscribers as of 21 January 2025.

Naiyarat was born in Bangkok, Thailand. She graduated from University of the Thai Chamber of Commerce. In April 2014, she starting to Livestreaming mostly horror game on her YouTube channel. Later, she became famous for playing games Ark: Survival Evolved until she joined Online Station As of 2016, she has reached 1 million subscribers on her YouTube channel in two years. In 2019, she passed 10 million subscribers to her YouTube channel, which is considered Thailand's first live streaming video game YouTube channel.

Naiyarat is one of the celebrities in YouTube in Thailand especially among children and teenagers. In 2019, she was a favorite from a survey of Thai children's dream careers. In 2021, she is one of the 100 Thai people with an innovative heart by the National Innovation Agency.

== Filmography ==
=== Series ===
- A Tale of Thousand Stars as Cartoon voice actress (2020)

=== Voice Acting ===
- Ann from One Piece: Stampede (2019)
- Ping from game Home Sweet Home: Survive (2021)
- Uta from One Piece Film: Red (2022)
- Hibara Ai (Miyano Shiho) from Detective Conan Haibara Ai Monogatari Kurogane no Mystery Train (2023)
- Naomi Argento from Detective Conan: Black Iron Submarine (2023)
- MEM-cho from Oshi no Ko (2023)
- Shining Glitter Cookie form Cookie Run: Kingdom (2023)

=== Song ===
- Song "Plaek Plueng Adeed Thi Phaen Pan" together with ToNy_GospeL (2021)
