= Werner H. Bloss =

German physicist

- Born: 24.Feb.1930; Winterbach, Baden-Württemberg, Germany
- Died: 6 June 1995 (aged 64–65)
- Citizenship: Germany
- Education: University of Tübingen, University of Stuttgart
- Awards: Solar Award of the German Section of ISES, Becquerel Prize of the Commission of the European Communities, 1st Class Order of Merit of the Federal Republic of Germany (1990)
- Scientific career
- Fields: Condensed Matter Physics
- Workplaces: Institute of Physical Electronics
- Notable students: Wahid Shams-Kolahi

Werner H. Bloss (1930 – 6 June 1995) was a scientist known for his work in the field of photovoltaics. He was the director of the Institute of Physical Electronics at the University of Stuttgart.

== Biography ==
Werner H. Bloss studied Physics at the University of Tübingen and the University of Stuttgart. In 1955 he took the position of a research assistant at the Institute of Gas Discharge Techniques and Photoelectronics at the University of Stuttgart. Here he came into contact with various methods of energy conversion. In his doctoral thesis he described the noble gas filled thermionic converter developed by him. In the early sixties, very successful research work on various types of thermionic converters was performed under his guidance at the above-mentioned institute.

In the autumn of 1967 he took a position as Associate Professor at the University of Florida in Gainesville, Florida. During his two-year stay in the United States his field of interest widened again to take in optical methods of image processing. After returning from the US he implemented this novel field of research at the institute in Stuttgart.

On 1 October 1970 Dr. Bloss became the director of his institute at the University of Stuttgart. He renamed it "Institute of Physical Electronics" (IPE). Professor Bloss focused the research on three main fields:

1. Image processing: analog optical as well as digital image processing
2. Photovoltaics, especially development of thin film solar cells
3. Applied plasma research, in particular in the field of ignition and combustion processes

== Books and publications ==
This is a short version of the most important books and publications that Professor Bloss authored or co-authored:

=== Books ===
- FAZYTAN-IPS Prescreening System. In Clinical Cytometry and Histometry (Mustererkennung - Methode zur Behandlung von Vielparameterproblemen)
- Quantitative ultraviolet microscopy. 15th europ Congr Cyto- logy, Baden-Baden (Stellenwert der Tumormarker bei der Früherkennung) gastrointestinaler Tumoren
- Biomedical Engineering (STRUKTURANALYSE MIT METHODEN DER DIGITALEN BILDVERARBEITUNG)

=== Scientific publications ===
- W. H. Bloss, F. Pfisterer, M. B. Schubert, and T. Walter 3, 3 - (1995) Thin Film Solar Cells
- N2 laser (1 bar) induced micro metal plasma capable of igniting combustible mixtures, W. Herden - W. H. Bloss - Applied Physics Letters - Vol. 31 - Issue 2 - 1977 - p. 66
- CVD-Verfahren zur Präparation von a-Si:H und Deposition amorpher Si-Mischhalbleiter, G.H. Bauer, G. Bilger, A. Eickd, H.-D. Mohring, C.E. Nebel, S.M. Paasche, M. B. Schubert, G. Schumm, H.C. Weller, and W.H. Bloss in Statusreport 1987, edited by: (Photovoltaik PBE KFA, Jülich, Deutschland, 1987), 450 - (1987)
- Integrated CuxS-CdS Thin Film Solar Cell Panels With Higher Output Voltages, W. Arndt, G. Bilger, F. Pfisterer, H. W. Schock, J. Wörner, and W. H. Bloss, in Proc. 3rd EC Photov. Solar Energy Conf., Cannes, Oct. 27-31, edited by: (D. Reidel Publ. Comp., Dordrecht, 1981), 798 - (1981)
- A Fabrication Process for Cu2S-CdS Thin Film Solar Cells, W. H. Bloss, W. Arndt, G. Bilger, G.H. Hewig, F. Pfisterer, and H. W. Schock, in Sun II, Proc. Int. Solar Energy Society Silver Jubilee Congr., edited by: Karl W. Böer, Barbara H. Glenn (Pergamon Press, Atlanta, USA, 1979), 1773 - (1979)
- Integrated Cu2S-CdS Thin Film Solar Generators, W. Arndt, G. Bilger, G. H. Hewig, F. Pfisterer, H. W. Schock, J. Wörner, and W.H. Bloss, in Proc. 2nd EC Photovolt. Solar Energy Conf., Berlin, April 23–26, 1979, edited by: (D. Reidel Publ. Comp., Dordrecht / Boston, 1979), 826 - (1979)
- Cu2S-CdS Thin Film Solar Cell Technology, W. Arndt, G. Bilger, W.H. Bloss, G. H. Hewig, F. Pfisterer, H. W. Schock, and J. Wörner, in Proc. Symp. "MICRO-79", edited by: (Banaras Hindu University, Varanasi, Indien, 1979) (1979)
- A Pilote Line for the Production of Large Area CuxS-CdS Solar Cells, H. W. Schock, W. Arndt, G. Bilger, G.H. Hewig, F. Pfisterer, and W.H. Bloss, in Sun: Mankind's future source of energy, edited by: F. de Winter, M. Cox (ISEC 77, New Delhi, 1978), 670 - (1978)
- Improvement of Efficiency and Stability By Copper Treatment and Front Contacting of CuxS-CdS Solar Cells, F. Pfisterer, G. Bilger, H. W. Schock, and W.H. Bloss, in Sun: Mankind's future source of energy, edited by: F. de Winter, M. Cox (ISEC 77, New Delhi, 1978) (1978)
- CdS-Cu2S Thin Film Solar Cells for Terrestrial Applications, W. Arndt, G. Bilger, W.H. Bloss, G.H. Hewig, F. Pfisterer, and H. W. Schock, in Proc. 1st EC Photov. Solar Energy Conf., Luxembourg, Sept. 27-30, 1977, edited by: (D. Reidel Publ. Comp., Dordrecht / Boston, 1977), 547 - (1977)
- Technology and Structure of the CuxS-CdS Thin Film Solar Cells, G. Bilger, G.H. Hewig, M. K. Mukherjee, F. Pfisterer, H. W. Schock, and W. H. Bloss, in Spring Meeting of the German Physical Soc., Freudenstadt, April 5–8, 1976, edited by: (Verhandl. der Deutschen Physikal. Gesellschaft, Deutschland, 7/1976), 521 - (7)
- Einsatz des CVD-Verfahrens zur Herstellung von a-Si:H-Solarzellen, G.H. Bauer, G. Bilger, A. Eicke, F. Kessler, E. Lotter, H.-D. Mohring, C.E. Nebel, S.M. Paasche, M. B. Schubert, G. Schumm, H.C. Weller, and W.H. Bloss, Abschlußbericht BMFT-Projekt 03E 8019-B, PBE-KFA, Jülich, Deutschland (1989)
