= Saeed Shirkavand =

Iranian politician

Saeed Shirkavand (Persian: سعید شیرکوند) was Vice Minister in the Ministry of Economic Affairs and Finance (Iran) under former Minister Safdar Hosseini in the government of President Mohammad Khatami.

He is an assistant professor in management faculty of University of Tehran, beloved by students according to many surveys.

In addition he is a member of Islamic Iran Participation Front and Islamic Iran Participation Front's Central Council.

== See also ==
- List of contemporary Iranian scientists, scholars, and engineers
- Ministry of Economic Affairs and Finance (Iran)
- وزارت امور اقتصادی و دارایی
