= Din Daeng Subdistrict =

Din Daeng ดินแดง
- Khwaeng
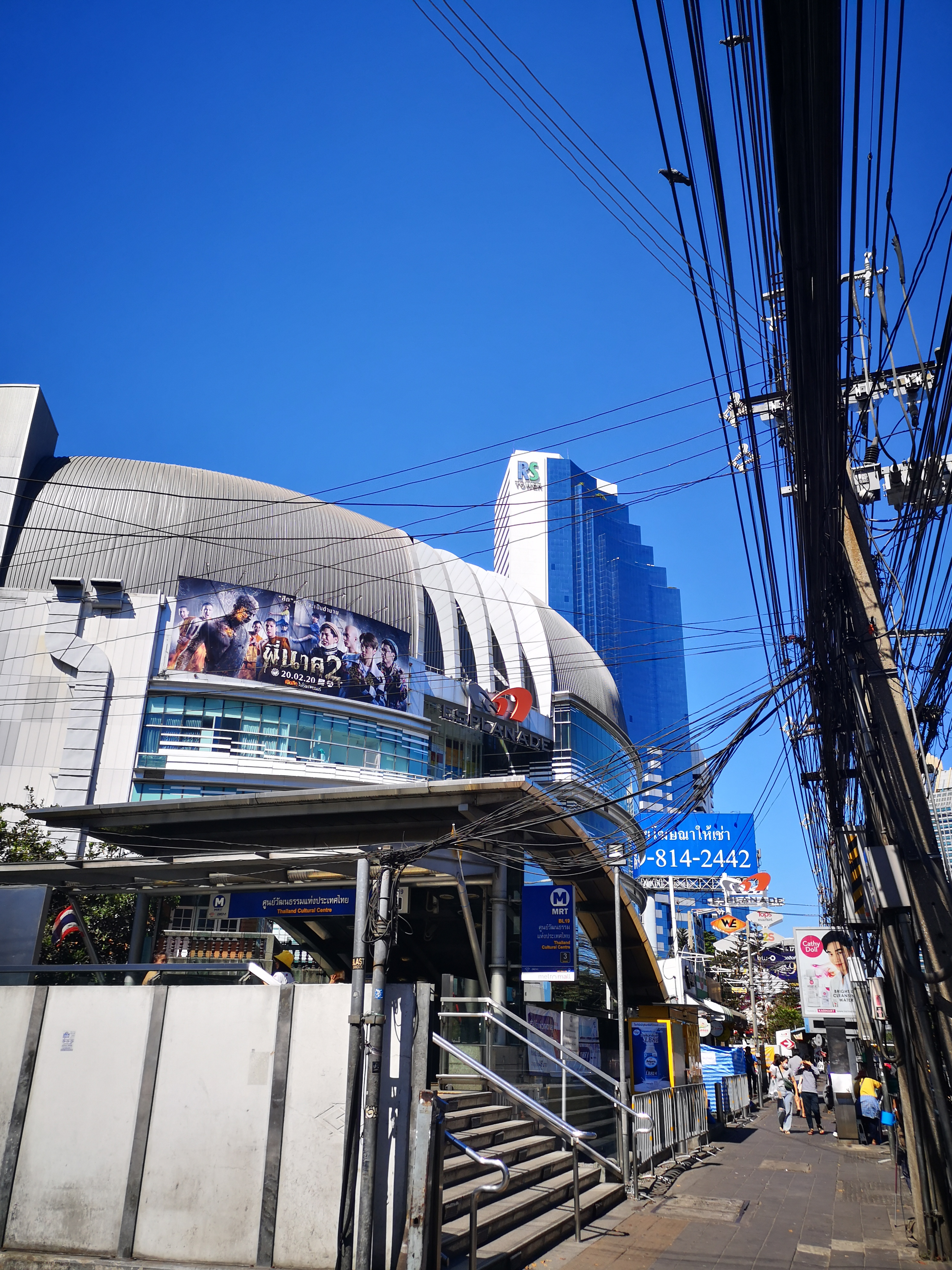
- Esplanade Rachadapisek

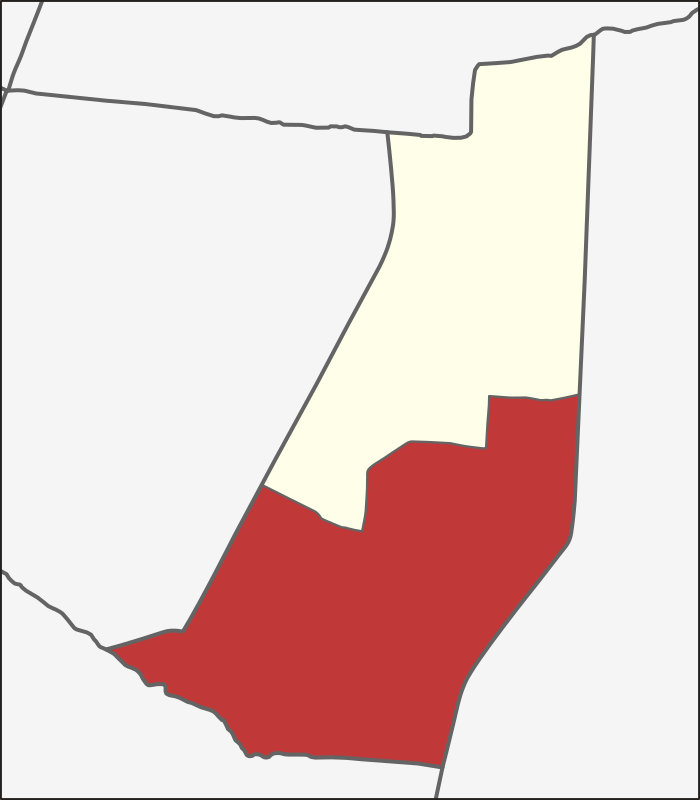
- Location in Din Daeng District
- Country: Thailand
- Province: Bangkok
- Khet: Din Daeng

Area
  - Total: 4.618 km^{2} (1.783 sq mi)

Population (2023)
  - Total: 68,251
- Time zone: UTC+7 (ICT)

Din Daeng (Thai: ดินแดง, pronounced [dīn dɛ̄ːŋ]) is one of the khwaeng in Din Daeng District, Bangkok. In 2023, it had a population of 68,251.
