= Econometric Reviews =

- Language: English
- Edited by: Esfandiar Maasoumi

Publication details
- History: 1982-present
- Publisher: Taylor & Francis
- Frequency: Bimonthly

Standard abbreviations
- ISO 4: Econom. Rev.
- MathSciNet: Econometric Rev.

Indexing
- CODEN: ECREEP
- ISSN: 0747-4938 (print); 1532-4168 (web)
- LCCN: 85645308
- OCLC no.: 612157134

Links
- Online access; Online archive

Econometric Reviews is a scholarly econometrics journal. It is published six times per year. Along with articles on econometrics, the journal also includes reviews of books and software within the scope of the journal's econometrics coverage.

Its editor is Esfandiar Maasoumi.
