= Ingo Beyer von Morgenstern =

German academic

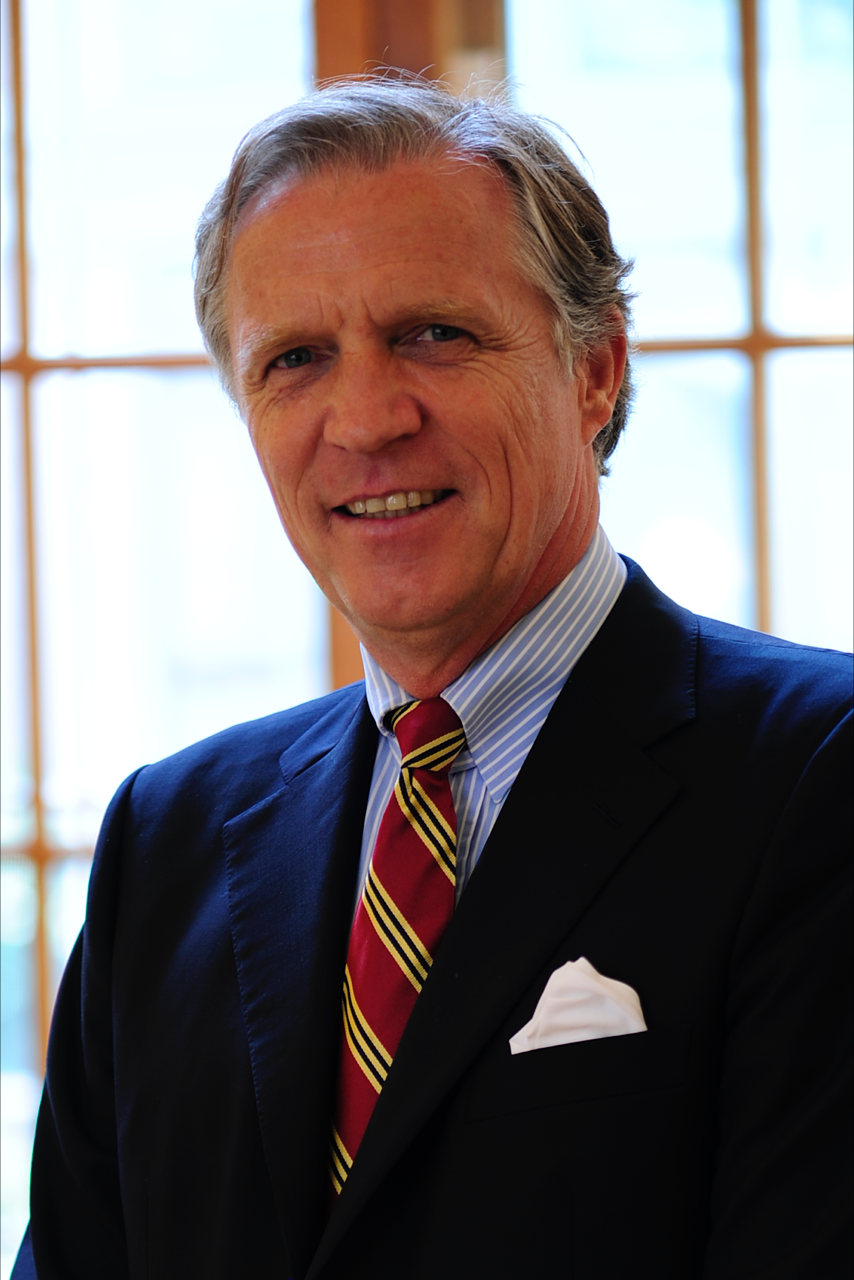
- Born: August 27, 1955 (age 71); Braunschweig, Germany
- Education: Technical University of Munich; INSEAD

Ingo Beyer von Morgenstern (born August 27, 1955) is a director emeritus of McKinsey & Company and one of the longest-serving foreign professors in China at Tsinghua University. He is chairman of the Harbour.Space University in Barcelona and Qilin Capital Fund and on the advisory council of multiple families in Germany and Asia.

== Personal life and education ==
Beyer von Jutrzenka-Morgenstern is the son of Manfred and Jutta Beyer von Jutrzenka-Morgenstern.

Beyer von Morgenstern finished his PhD in thermo and fluid dynamics from the Technical University of Munich in 1983. He taught at both the physics and the microeconomic Department of the Technical University of Munich for many years. He frequently contributed his perspectives on regulatory issues in the telecom industry to the World Economic Forum. Beyer von Morgenstern also holds an MBA with distinction from INSEAD, Fontainebleau which he received in 1984. Since 2005 Beyer von Morgenstern is an honorary Professor at Tsinghua University, Beijing, China.

Beyer von Morgenstern is married to Isabel Beyer von Jutrzenka-Morgenstern, née von Salmuth and has 5 children.

== McKinsey & Company ==
He joined McKinsey & Comp. in 1985, was elected Principal in 1991 and Director in 1997. As Managing Director for the European High Tech Practice he was responsible for the High Tech Industries, comprising Software & Service, Consumer Electronics, Aerospace, Semiconductors, Computing Equipment, Telecom Equipment and Industrial Electronics. He is credited with introducing several Multinational Clients and multiple new problem solving frameworks to the Firm. From 2004 until 2014 he led McKinsey's TMT (Telecom, Media and High Tech) Industry Sector in Asia and co-led the global one. He was member of McKinsey‘s Director Committee.

== Current ventures ==
Beyer von Morgenstern is one of the longest serving foreign professors in China, at China's leading Tsinghua University. He regularly lectures at Tsinghua School of Economics and Management on topics like global leadership, strategy and high tech.

He is currently Chairman and co- owner of Harbour.Space University, a private university that combines technology and design, taught by industry leaders from around the world. The university is located in Barcelona, Spain and Bangkok, Thailand which opened in September 2016 and 2020.

He is Chairman of Qilin Capital GmbH, the research partner of the ACATIS Qilin Marco Polo Asia Fund (ISIN DE000A2PB655 und DE000A2PB663). Qilin Capital has its own proprietary research in Shanghai, China.

Beyer von Morgenstern is a founder of the start up, Masii, a comparison platform in Thailand.
