= Camran Nezhat =

Iranian-American laparoscopic surgeon

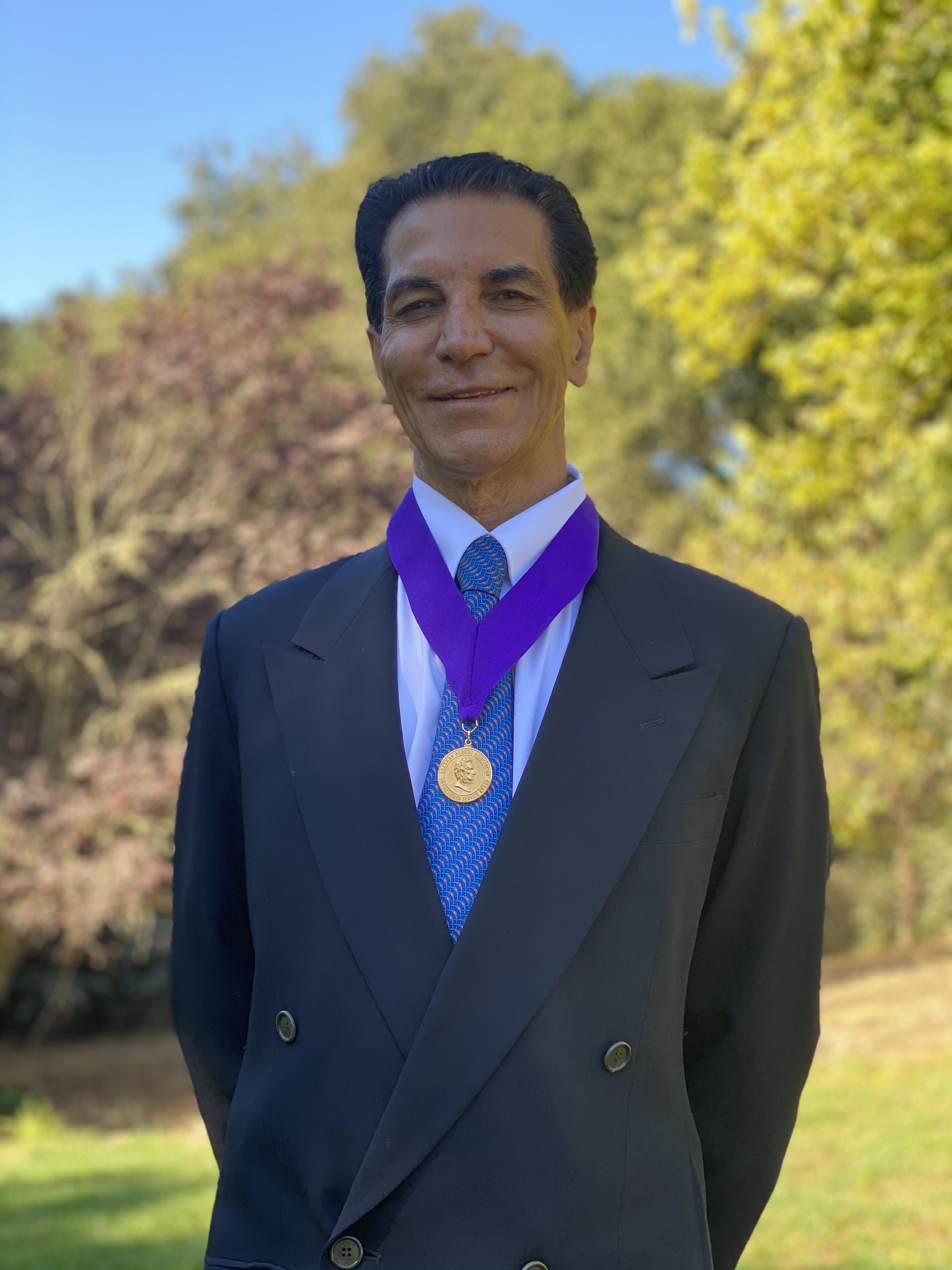
- Born: Shahreza, Iran
- Education: Tehran University of Medical Sciences (M.D.)
- Occupation: Gynecologist

Camran Nezhat is an American gynecologist, laparoscopic surgeon, reproductive endocrinology and infertility specialist. He has been working as an adjunct clinical professor of surgery, obstetrics and gynecology at Stanford University Medical Center in Palo Alto, California since 1993. Nezhat is also chair of the Association of the Adjunct Clinical Faculty, Stanford University School of Medicine, and a clinical professor of OB/GYN at the University of California, San Francisco.

Nezhat is a pioneer and leading practitioner in the field of laparoscopic surgery, also referred to as minimally invasive, endoscopic, keyhole, and Band-Aid surgery. Nezhat is best known for the surgical innovation referred to as video-laparoscopy or "operating off the monitor", a method now widely accepted but which was, until recently, considered a controversial and questionable departure from classical laparotomy or open surgery.

== Early life and education ==
Nezhat was born in Shahreza, Iran, a small, rural town in the central part of the country. After taking a college entrance exam, Nezhat's score qualified him for acceptance to Tehran University of Medical Sciences, located in the capital city of Tehran. He attended from 1965 to 1972, and received his medical degree in 1972. After fulfilling a military conscription requirement, Nezhat attended and completed his residency program in obstetrics and gynecology at the State University of New York at Buffalo, from 1974 to 1978. He completed a fellowship in reproductive endocrinology and infertility in Augusta, Georgia, under Drs. Robert Greenblatt and Don Gambrell. After fulfilling this fellowship from 1978 to 1980, Nezhat started his own private practice in Atlanta, Georgia, with hospital privileges at Northside Hospital. He became certified by the American Board of Obstetrics and Gynecology in 1982. Nezhat holds medical licenses in the state of Georgia and California.

== Surgical techniques ==
Nezhat introduced several innovations that were at first considered unacceptable deviations from classical surgical techniques. The first departure from traditional surgical methods occurred in approximately the mid-1970s, when Nezhat began experimenting in the lab with "operating off the monitor", a phrase that refers to the method of performing endoscopic surgery (referred to as a laparoscope when used for abdominal surgeries) while viewing a TV/video monitor in an upright position, operating off the video images, instead of looking directly at the patient. Prior to Nezhat's innovation, surgeons performed laparoscopy while peering directly into the endoscope's eyepiece, a method which limited their ability to perform operations because it left only one hand free, limited their field of vision, and required them to hunch over and move around in awkward positions.

With these physical limitations in place, surgeons found it difficult to believe that operative laparoscopic techniques could replace classical surgery and, initially, many in the medical community considered the entire notion to be an untenable, unrealistic, and dangerous idea. The idea of using the endoscope as an operative device also went against at least 200 years of medical tradition, which had established the endoscope, since its approximately 1806 modern debut of endoscopy by Philip Bozzini, as a predominantly diagnostic tool; operative applications in gynecology were confined to simple interventions, such as lysis of adhesions (removal of scar tissue), biopsies, draining of cysts, cautery of neoplasms, and tubal ligations. When Nezhat began using his new video-laparoscopic technique of operating off the monitor in an upright position, he was able to achieve more advanced operative procedures for the first time. Performing these advanced surgeries laparoscopically was the second unorthodox conceptual change that Nezhat introduced. Other innovations by Nezhat that were considered controversial included the introduction of new surgical procedures and new surgical instrumentation designed specifically for use in laparoscopy. Because these new surgical concepts went against established norms of classical surgery and were believed to be dangerous, Nezhat fell under intense scrutiny and criticism from those within mainstream medical establishments, and later from the national newspapers (see "Controversies" section below). For approximately the next 25 years, Nezhat became one of the most visible and controversial figures in the minimally invasive movement because of his vocal advocacy of these new techniques and for continuing to push the envelope by performing more advanced procedures laparoscopically. Even as late as the 2000s, there were many opponents to these techniques who continued to call into question the safety and necessity of video-laparoscopy, especially when used for more advanced laparoscopic techniques. However, by approximately the mid-1990s it can be established that most of the initial misgivings about video-laparoscopy had subsided because by then the nation's most prominent academic medical schools in the U.S., such as Stanford University School of Medicine, had adopted this change and began teaching it as part of the standard medical school curriculum. By the early 2000s, many medical societies, such as American Association of Gynecologic Laparoscopists, Society of Laparoendoscopic Surgeons, and the Society of American Gastrointestinal and Endoscopic Surgeons, also began offering fellowships in advanced operative video-laparoscopy.

There are still several contraindications for advanced operative video-laparoscopy, such as in emergency room medicine. However, with these and a few other exceptions, today the debate has now been resolved in favor of advanced operative video-laparoscopy for most surgical situations. The mainstream medical community has acknowledged operating off the monitor in video-laparoscopy to be the gold standard in various disciplines, such as gynecologic, gastrointestinal, thoracic, vascular, urological, and general surgery. For this reason, Nezhat has been cited by laparoendoscopic surgeons as the father of modern operative laparoscopy, for introducing important technological and conceptual breakthroughs that helped medicine move toward minimally invasive surgery.

The reason that the medical community now considers advanced operative video-laparoscopy so important is that it provided an alternative to classical surgery – laparotomy – which required a large incision, between 12-14 inches, which exposed patients to serious, life-threatening complications. These large incisions were held open by metal clamps, called retractors (see image), which created even more trauma to the tissue. Though these open methods were convenient for the surgeon, it was very debilitating and painful for the patient, causing more adhesions (scar tissue), more extensive blood loss, necessitating large volume blood transfusions, and requiring longer hospital stays, with 1–3 weeks in the hospital, including possible time in the ICU, considered as normal outcomes. Another serious complication was chronic incisional hernias, a condition in which the incision fails to heal, causing it to continually ooze and break open, even for years after the surgery. However, the most important difference was that, when compared to video-laparoscopy, a laparotomy posed more serious, permanent, and life-threatening complications, including a higher incidence of death.

By the late 1970s, with the exception of a few surgical virtuosos, such as Raoul Palmer, Patrick Steptoe, and Kurt Semm, gynecologic surgeons were only able to use the laparoscope to perform a few simple operative procedures, such as aspiration of cysts, lysis of adhesions, cauterizing of neoplasms, biopsies, and tubal ligations. This meant that other, more complicated gynecologic surgical procedures, such as the treatment of advanced stage (stage IV) endometriosis, hysterectomies, radical hysterectomies for cancer, para aortic node dissections, tubal reaanastomosis (reconstructive surgery of the fallopian tubes), full removal of ovarian cysts, and myomectomies (full removal of fibroids), could only be done via laparotomy. Some of these conditions, such as endometriosis, fibroids, and cysts, can be chronic diseases that require multiple surgical interventions. This meant that, prior to minimally invasive surgery, many women underwent multiple laparotomies for only mild pathologies. In these cases, the surgical intervention of a laparotomy was considered to be more damaging than the disease itself. Prior to the advent of video laparoscopy, other types of surgeries (from other disciplines), such as the removal of the gallbladder (cholecystectomy), bowel, bladder, and ureter resections and reaanastomoses, etc., were also only possible via laparotomy.

== Controversies ==
This divide between the old way and the new led to a very intense philosophical debate within the medical community, causing antagonism between classical versus laparoscopic surgeons. Opponents of minimally invasive surgery accused laparoscopists of hiding their complication rates and advancing dangerous methods in order to seek fame and financial gain. Proponents accused classical surgeons of advocating outdated surgical procedures that were dangerous for patients, because they didn't want to take the time and expense to learn the new techniques. By the late 1990s and early 2000s, this internecine fighting became especially intense, culminating in even more serious allegations made against laparoscopists, including Nezhat, who had come to represent one of the minimally invasive movement's most visible leaders.

Two lawsuits in particular also triggered nationwide media coverage about Nezhat and minimally invasive surgery. Starting in approximately April 2000, a series of newspaper articles were published about Nezhat, and his two surgeon brothers, Farr and Ceana, outlining all of the allegations claimed in these lawsuits. In one case, filed by former patient, Debra Manov, online court records show that the patient withdrew her medical malpractice claim with prejudice on July 21, 1998, after not being able to find a medical expert to corroborate her claims. The judge ruled that the claims were baseless and/or frivolous and dismissed Manov's entire case. The judge imposed a fine against Manov's attorney for filing a frivolous lawsuit.

Another former patient, Mary (Stacey) Mullen, and her attorney, Jim Neal, claimed that Nezhat's surgery caused her permanent damage to her bowel. Mullen and Neal (and later Mullen's new attorney, Byrne) also accused Nezhat of battery and of being involved in RICO offenses (Racketeer Influenced and Corrupt Organizations). The judge found these and several other claims to be baseless and frivolous. Jim Neal was disqualified from Mullen's case by a Georgia judge in 1995 for "unethical behavior" After a federal judge tossed out Neal's attempt to use racketeering charges against the Nezhats, Neal was charged with contempt of court.

The final outcome is not known for some portions of the Mullen lawsuit, since some of the court records are sealed. However, what court records online show is that Mullen withdrew her lawsuit on May 24, 2002. Later news reports came out describing the case as "resolved", suggesting that an out-of-court settlement was reached.

For these two cases, the plaintiff attorney, Jim Neal, hired two Stanford-affiliated doctors, Dr. Thomas Margolis and Dr. Nicola Spirtos, as his medical experts. Spirtos and Margolis, two gynecologic surgeons who were partners in a Palo Alto clinic called Women's Cancer Center (now closed), also accused Nezhat of various offenses, including of performing dangerous, experimental surgeries with the laparoscope. They suggested that Stanford failed to fully investigate Nezhat because his high-profile status - he was referred to by the press as a celebrity surgeon - was reportedly translating to millions of dollars for their bottom line. In Nezhat's defense, officials at Stanford said they investigated every claim and found them baseless, and described Spirtos and Margolis as "jealous competitors". In this vein, Stanford officials and Nezhat supporters mentioned that Spirtos' private clinical practice was one floor down from Nezhat's. Spirtos also lost an election at Stanford to Nezhat, for the position of deputy chief of the obstetrics and gynecology department.

Proponents of the Nezhat's said these surgeries were not experimental. Dr. Robert R. Franklin, a clinical professor in the department of obstetrics and gynecology at Houston's Baylor College of Medicine, said that "In my opinion, the surgery performed on Mary (Stacey) Mullen was a necessary procedure and would not require any special consent form for experimental surgery."

The controversy continued when it was reported that Spirtos had sued Stanford in 1991 for defamation – claiming several things, including that he was discriminated against after becoming affiliated with the Women's Cancer Center, and that Stanford retaliated against him for speaking out against Nezhat. The Santa Clara County Superior Court judge found this lawsuit to be without merit and dismissed it (case title Spirtos M.D. -Vs-Stanford University, case number 1-01-CV-796939). The case was deemed frivolous by the judge and the court awarded Stanford $12,000 in attorneys' fees, payable by Spirtos and his attorney.

On February 21, 2001, Nezhat's research also fell under suspicion after a medical journal decided to retract two of his articles, both of which were co-authored by his brother, Dr. Farr Nezhat, and a colorectal surgeon, Dr. Earl Pennington. Data collected for these two articles were found to be flawed. Opponents claimed that these mistakes were intentional and constituted research fraud. Proponents said that "the slight discrepancies in patient data had no impact on the paper's conclusions." It was reported that the journal's decision to retract the articles was motivated by fear of lawsuits because it had received dozens of complaints by the attorney, Jim Neal, since approximately 1993.

In response to these growing concerns about Nezhat's work, in November 2000 Stanford put together a blue-ribbon committee, with former California Supreme Court Justice Edward A. Panelli as the lead investigator. The other committee members were an expert on medical ethics from UC Davis, and a retired dean from Harvard University School of Medicine. On December 21, 2001, after even more newspaper articles came out about Nezhat, Phil Pizzo, who had been appointed dean of Stanford's medical school in April 2001, announced that he had decided to suspend Nezhat and his two brothers until he could make more investigations into the matter.

In August 2002 this ad-hoc committee released its findings. It determined that all of the allegations were unsubstantiated and without basis, concluding that none of the three Nezhat brothers had engaged in any misconduct. The Nezhats were reinstated to Stanford in August 2002. Concerning the allegation of research fraud, the committee reported that it did find that errors were made in the two retracted articles, but in none of the other hundreds of publications by the Nezhats that were reviewed. The committee and Stanford cleared the Nezhats of any wrongdoing, determining that the errors were minor, inadvertent, and had no impact on the paper's conclusions. Two state medical boards – from California and Georgia – launched their own investigation of Nezhat and also found him to be not guilty of any misconduct.
