= Nasser Ashgriz =

Canadian engineer

Nasser Ashgriz is an Iranian-American-Canadian engineer, scientist, patent lawyer, and entrepreneur. He is currently a full professor in the Department of Mechanical and Industrial Engineering at the University of Toronto. Ashgriz is known for his contributions to the development of computational techniques for the modeling of free surface flows and interfaces, his work on droplet collision and coalescence, his advancements in diagnostic methods for spray characteristics, and his development of new models for liquid droplet breakup, fuel injectors, solid and liquid propellant rocket engines, and inkjet printers.

== Academic career ==
Ashgriz obtained his B.S. (1979), M.S. (1981), and Ph.D. (1984) degrees in Mechanical Engineering from Carnegie Mellon University, Pittsburgh, PA, where he was the recipient of two Bennet Prize awards (1981, 1983) in recognition of outstanding scholarly work in Mechanical Engineering.

Prior to going to Toronto, he was a professor of Mechanical and Aerospace Engineering at the State University of New York at Buffalo, Buffalo, New York.

While he was a professor at the University at Buffalo, he went to law school and received his law degree in 1996, from the same school (State University of New York at Buffalo).

== Bibliography ==
- Handbook of Atomization and Sprays, N. Ashgriz, Editor, Springer, 2011. ISBN 9781441972644
- Patent Pending in Eight Simple Steps, N. Ashgriz, Amazon Digital Services, 2021. ISBN 9781796583397
- Droplets, Sprays and Aerosols, N. Ashgriz, Amazon Digital Services, 2022. ISBN 9798471621657
