= Sajad Gharibi =

Iranian media personality

Personal information
- Nationality: Iranian
- Citizenship: Iran
- Born: 19 December 1991 (age 34) Ahvaz, Iran
- Occupation: Media personality
- Height: 6 ft 2 in (188 cm)
- Weight: 305 lb (138 kg)

Sajad Gharibi (born 19 December 1991) is an Iranian bodybuilder and mixed martial artist. His nickname is "the Iranian Hulk" or "Persian Hercules". He is 6 feet 2 inches tall and weighs 305 pounds.

== Career ==
In 2016, he was pursuing screen acting in Iran.

Gharibi rose to fame on Instagram, where he posted pictures of his physique and feats of strength.

In 2019, UFC star Brian Ortega challenged Gharibi to appear in the MMA ring, and he accepted. Ortega said he would smash “the Iranian Hulk” despite weighing about 120 pounds less than him. Gharibi had previously accepted a match against Britain's Martyn Ford, but the deal was cancelled. At the same time, Gharibi stated that he had agreed to fight Brazilian bodybuilder Romario dos Santos Alves, nicknamed “the Brazilian Hulk”.

On 31 July 2022 Gharibi made his boxing debut against "The Kazakh Titan" Djumanov Almat Bakhytovich. Gharibi lost by TKO in the first round.

== Personal life ==
Gharibi was born in Ahvaz, Iran. He received his Bachelor of Commerce degree from Azad University in Bushehr, Iran.

In 2016, Gharibi offered to participate in the fight against ISIS in Syria. He said in a video, "I'm a defender of my country, first. I want to thank General Qasem Soleimani and all the soldiers who lost their lives in Syria. They are my heroes."

He lives in Bushehr, Iran.
