= Wahid Shams Kolahi =

Iranian scientist (born 1965)

Wahid Shams-Kolahi
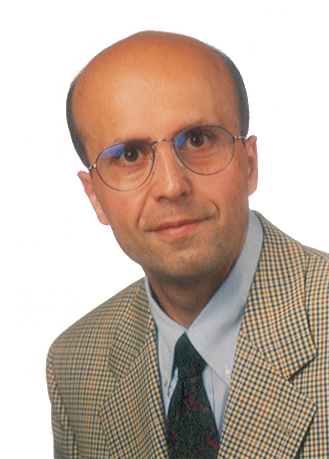
- Born: May 3, 1965 (age 61); Arak, Iran
- Education: Stuttgart University (Undergraduate, Electrical Engineering); Osaka University (M. Sc., Electrical Engineering); Osaka University (Ph.D., Electrical Engineering)
- Scientific career
- Fields: Electrical Engineering; Electrophysics; Physics; Solid State Electronics; Photovoltaic; Semiconductor Physics
- Doctoral advisor: Yoshihiro Hamakawa; Hiroaki Okamoto
- Other academic advisors: Werner H. Bloss; Manfred Pilkuhn

Wahid Shams-Kolahi (Persian: وحید شمس کلاهی) is a scientist and an electrical engineer who is known for his research in photovoltaic-related technologies.

Dr. Shams-Kolahi was born in Arak, Iran, in 1965. He obtained his undergraduate degree in electrical engineering at University of Stuttgart and joined the graduate school of electrical engineering/electrophysics, led by Professor Werner H. Bloss. He worked under Professor Bloss with the Institute of Physical Electronics, IPE, and later joined the Hamakawa Lab of the Graduate School of Electrical Engineering, Faculty of Engineering Science, Osaka University, Japan, where he obtained his master's degree in 1994 and his Ph.D. in 1997.

While at Hamakawa Lab, Wahid Shams-Kolahi conducted research on space-made materials and their potential for applications such as the absorption layer of solar cells. The team at Hamakawa Lab led by Shams-Kolahi was chosen by the Spacelab Mission Endeavour project, a cooperation between NASA of the United States and the Japanese NASDA, to study the electrical and optical properties of SiAsTe amorphous- or chalcogenide semiconductors fabricated under microgravity in space as part of Endeavour mission STS-47.

Wahid has initiated and conducted research in solid-state electronics and the manufacture of thin-film solar cells such as amorphous silicon, CIGS and CdTe.

== Notable projects ==
- Doping efficiency/doping effect on the electrical conductivity of amorphous semiconductors prepared in the space shuttle microgravity (Osaka University, Japan)
- Novel purification techniques for Semiconductors (Si) and Insulators; PRISED Solar Inc. & Centre for Advanced Nanotechnology, University of Toronto, Canada
- Optimization of epitaxial growth of ultra-thin platinum silicide (Mitsubishi Electric, Amagasaki, Japan)
- Differential methods for the computation of semiconductor band gaps (Osaka University, Japan)
- SIMS Study of the effect of gallium grading in Cu(In,Ga)Se_{2} (University of Stuttgart, Germany)
- Physical Vapor Deposition (PVD co-evaporation) of CIGS thin-film solar cells (Panasonic, Matsushita Denki, Kyoto, Japan)
- SLG-substrate softening temperature related to the formation of CIGS thin films (Panasonic, Matsushita Denki, Kyoto, Japan)
- Use of PVD for Light Amplification by nanocrystalline silicon sensitized erbium-doped silica (University of Toronto, Canada)
- Utilization of TOF-SIMS for the characterization and identification of Si-nanocrystals (University of Toronto, Canada)
- Simultaneous improvement of electrical and optical properties of TCO (ITO) thin films (University of Toronto, Canada)

== Selected publications ==
- Shams-Kolahi, Wahid; Endo, Shoichi; Kobayashi, Yuki; Honda, A.; Nakaike, S.; Toma, T.; Hambach, M.; Takeshima, S.; Okamoto, Hiroaki; Hamakawa, Yoshihiro (1996). "High-pressure effects in Si-As-Te amorphous chalcogenide glasses fabricated under microgravity environment". Journal of Non-Crystalline Solids. 198–200. Elsevier BV: 705–708. doi:10.1016/0022-3093(96)00012-9. ISSN 0022-3093.
- Shams-Kolahi, Wahid; Kobayashi, Michihiro; Hanzawa, Hiromasa; Okamoto, Hiroaki; Endo, Shoichi; Kobayashi, Yuki; Hamakawa, Yoshihiro (1996-09-15). "Pressure Effects on Electrical and Optical Properties of Si–As–Te Chalcogenide Glasses Fabricated in the Gravity Environment and in a Microgravity Environment". Japanese Journal of Applied Physics. 35 (Part 1, No. 9A). Japan Society of Applied Physics: 4713–4717. doi:10.1143/jjap.35.4713. ISSN 0021-4922.
- Shams-Kolahi, Wahid; Kobayashi, Michihiro; Hanzawa, Hiromasa; Kubota, Tomohiro; Kobayashi, Hikaru; Okamoto, Hiroaki; Endo, Shoichi; Kobayashi, Yuki; Hamakawa, Yoshihiro (1996-12-15). "Valence Band Structure of Si–As–Te Chalcogenide Glasses Prepared in the Gravity Environment of the Earth and in a Microgravity Environment in Space". Japanese Journal of Applied Physics. 35 (Part 1, No. 12A). Japan Society of Applied Physics: 6162–6165. doi:10.1143/jjap.35.6162. ISSN 0021-4922.
- Shams-Kolahi, Wahid; Kobayashi, Michihiro; Hanzawa, Hiromasa; Matsumura, Michio; Kobayashi, Hikaru; Okamoto, Hiroaki; Endo, Shoichi; Kobayashi, Yuki; Hamakawa, Yoshihiro (1997-03-15). "X-Ray Photoelectron Spectroscopy of Si–As–Te Chalcogenide Glasses Prepared in the Earth's Gravity and in Microgravity". Japanese Journal of Applied Physics. 36 (Part 1, No. 3A). Japan Society of Applied Physics: 987–990. doi:10.1143/jjap.36.987. ISSN 0021-4922.
- Minemoto, T; Hashimoto, Y; Shams-Kolahi, W; Satoh, T; Negami, T; Takakura, H; Hamakawa, Y (2003). "Control of conduction band offset in wide-gap Cu(In,Ga)Se solar cells". Solar Energy Materials and Solar Cells. 75 (1–2). Elsevier BV: 121–126. doi:10.1016/s0927-0248(02)00120-4. ISSN 0927-0248.
- Dullweber, T.; Hanna, G.; Shams-Kolahi, W.; Schwartzlander, A.; Contreras, M.A.; Noufi, R.; Schock, H.W. (2000). "Study of the effect of gallium grading in Cu(In,Ga)Se_{2}". Thin Solid Films. 361–362. Elsevier BV: 478–481. doi:10.1016/s0040-6090(99)00845-7. ISSN 0040-6090.
