= Abu al-Hasan al-Ahwazi =

Iranian mathematician

Abu al-Hasan al-Ahwazi, also known as Abu al-Hasan al-Ahvazi (Persian: ابوالحسن اهوازی, romanized: Abū al-Ḥasan al-Ahwāzī) was a Persian mathematician and astronomer of the 4th AH/10th CE and 5th AH/11th CE centuries. His name suggests that he was originally from Ahvaz, now in modern Iran. The Iranian scholar Al-Biruni mentioned his name in his works, an indication that Ahvazi's works were considered to be important. Ahvazi mentioned the Iranian astronomer and mathematician Abū Ja'far al-Khāzin in one of his books. Since Al-Khazin died in 360 AH (c. 982 CE), it can be concluded that the final years of Ahvazi's life was contemporaneous to Biruni's childhood.

Ahvazi's book Sharh al-maqala al-ashira min kitab uqlidus is extant.

K. al-Amtal al-musammā bi-l-Fara'id wa-l-qala'id, a work previously attributed to another author, was probably written by Abū l-Ḥasan al-Ahwazi (d. 428/1037) It contains eight chapters of original sayings that were intended to be understood as proverbs.

== Sources ==
- Baalbaki, Ramzi (2014). The Arabic Lexicographical Tradition: From the 2nd/8th to the 12th/18th Century. Brill Publishers. ISBN 978-90042-7-401-3.
