= Abu Ishaq al-Kubunani =

Persian mathematician and astronomer

- أبو إسحاق القبناني
- Died: d. after 886/1481

Academic work
- Era: Islamic Golden Age
- Main interests: Mathematics, astronomy

Abu Ishaq al-Kubunani (Persian: ابواسحاق بن عبداللّه کوبنانی یزدی) (d. after 886/1481), was a Persian mathematician, astronomer and man of letters. As his name suggests, he was from Kūbunān, a rural district approximately 150 kilometres (93 mi) north-west of Kerman. He was active from 845 to 886 AH. He studied in a school named Sa'die and then became a teacher in that same school. It appears that he lived in Sari for a long time and local rulers of Tabaristan patronized him, as he wrote some of his works in Tabaristan and offered them to the rulers of Tabaristan. He was well-versed in Persian and Arabic literature and some of his poems are preserved in his works such as Mansha'at (منشآت) and even on his mathematical works. His works are in both Persian and Arabic.
