= Talat Rotfai =

Night market in Bangkok, Thailand

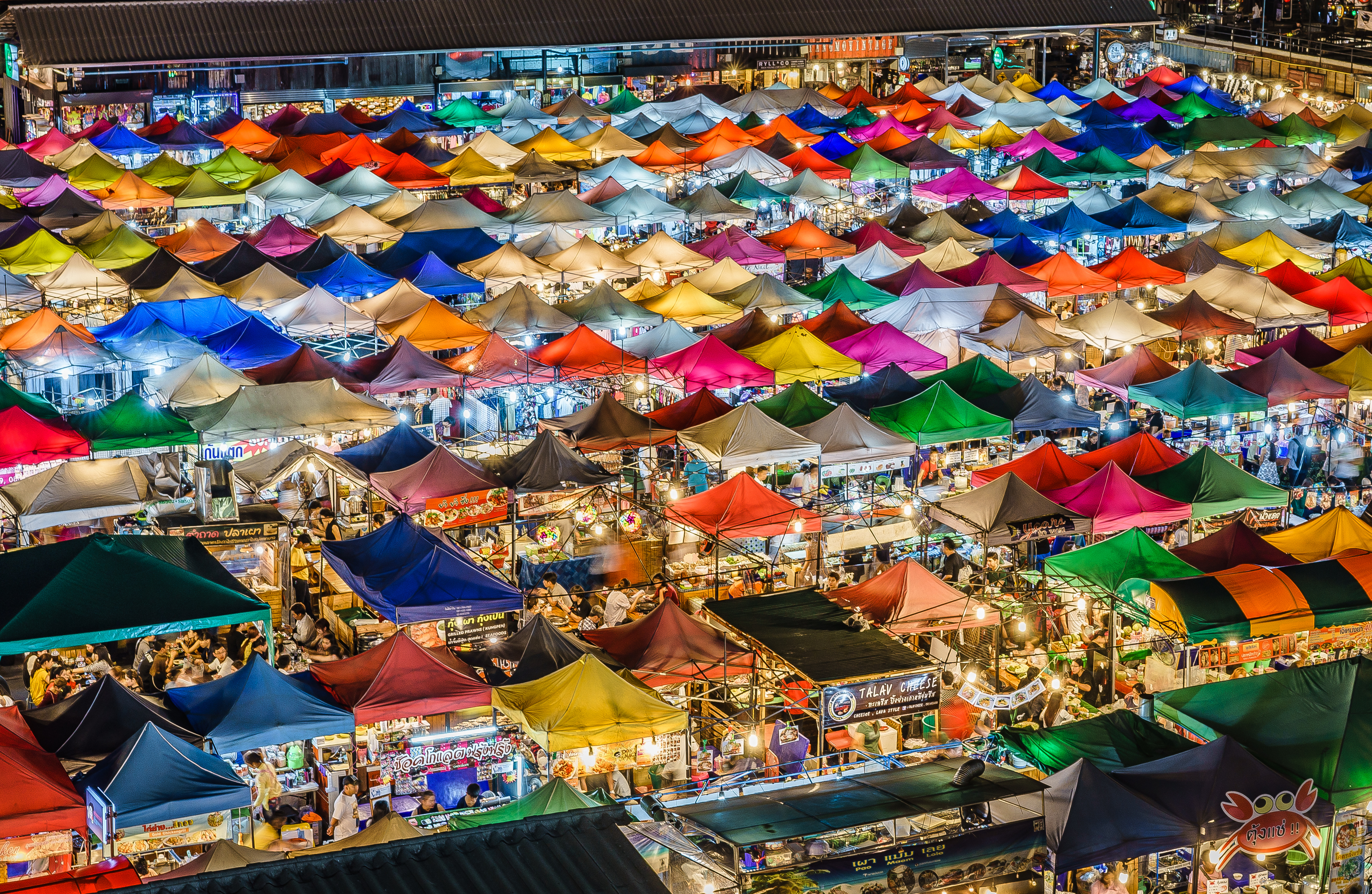
The Train Night Market Ratchada

Talat Rotfai (Thai: ตลาดรถไฟ, pronounced [tā.làːt rót.fāj], also known as the Train Night Market, is a chain of night markets in Bangkok, Thailand. Originally located near the Chatuchak Weekend Market on State Railway of Thailand (SRT) land, it has since relocated to Srinagarindra Road, with a second branch on Ratchadaphisek Road and a third on Prasoet Manu Kit Road.

The night market is open for 4 days of the week, Thursday, Friday, Saturday and Sunday. The markets focus on antiques and vintage-style items, especially clothing and home accessories, as well as a large variety of food and drink. Its primary location on Srinagarindra Road has been ranked the most popular night market in Bangkok.

The market was founded by Pairod Roikaew, previously an antiques dealer, in 2010. It was located on part of the SRT's railway yard on Kamphaeng Phet Road, among unused warehouses, tracks and rolling stock (hence the name). Featuring a vintage atmosphere, it quickly became popular with Bangkok's youth, but was forced to close down in 2013 when the area was marked for construction of the Bang Sue Central Station. Pairod reopened the market at a new location on Srinagarindra Road, behind the Seacon Square shopping centre.

The new location, despite being far from the city centre with no rapid transit access, continued to be popular, and a second branch next to The Esplanade shopping centre was opened on Ratchadaphisek Road in 2015. A third branch on Kaset–Nawamin (Prasoet Manukit) Road was opened later the same year. The market is now accessible via the new MRT Yellow Line monorail.

In July 2021, following the COVID-19 pandemic, the Ratchadaphisek branch of the market was severely affected and had to close. However, it reopened at its original location in March 2026.
