= Sajjad Sadeghi =

Iranian political scientist (born 1983)

- Born: 19 July 1983 (age 43); Tehran, Iran

Education
- Education: MA of American Studies at Tehran University, PhD of international Relations at Allameh Tabataba'i University
- Thesis: The U.S and theorizing international relations (2023)

Philosophical work
- Era: International Relations
- Region: Persian International Relations
- School: Persian International Relations
- Institutions: Allameh Tabataba'i University; Tehran University
- Main interests: International security, nuclear security, anarchy
- Notable ideas: Neo Cold War

Sajjad Sadeghi (Persian: سجاد صادقی; born 19 July 1983 in Tehran) is an Iranian international relations researcher known for human rights activities, environmental activities and well-known as a political prisoner. He was a senior member of the Iranian Regional Studies Association (IRSA). From May 2013 to June 2019, he worked in the Political Department of IRIB as a senior researcher on the U.S. desk, political journalist and as a radio host, which was accompanied by controversy due to his conflict with the religious dictatorship of Islamic government of Iran. Sajjad Sadeghi was arrested by the Iranian Ministry of Intelligence in 2019, 2022, 2024 and 2025 for opposing the policies of the Islamic Republic and was sentenced by judicial verdicts to flogging, imprisonment, prohibition from appearing in the media, prohibition from publishing content in cyberspace and prohibition from teaching at universities. He is the founder of the Iranian theory of the Neo Cold War in international relations.

== Imprisonment ==
=== First imprisonment (Exposing the financial corruption of the Iranian leader's family) ===
Sajjad Sadeghi was arrested by the Ministry of Intelligence (Iran) in 2019 for disclosing information about receiving a bribe in an oil deal (crescent) by khamenhi's family and was sentenced to three sentences of 74 lashes upon the complaint filed by a member of the regime's parliament. Then Sajjad Sadeghi has been banned from working for the Radio and Television (IRIB) since June 2019, as well as writing or talking about political issues. In July 2020 sentence was carried out.

=== Second imprisonment (Mahsa Amini Protest) ===
Sajjad Sadeghi was arrested in October 2022 during nationwide Mahsa Amini Protest,(woman, life, freedom movement) and was released on bail five months later. His crime was participating in demonstrations against the Islamic Republic of Iran.

=== Thirth imprisonment (Writing an article on the role of the Islamic Republic of Iran and its proxy forces in the unrest in the Middle East) ===
Sajjad Sadeghi on 17 September 2024 was arrested by the security forces in Tehran and taken to an unknown location. His crime was writing an article in English on international relations and sending it to a think tank in the U.S. Several security officers came to Mr. Sadeghi's residence in western Tehran, arrested him, and confiscated his electronic devices after searching the premises. on October 7, 2024 after going through the process of interrogations and explaining the charges, he was released from temporary detention by posting bail. then Sajjad Sadeghi, has been sentenced in absentia by Branch 26 of the Tehran Revolutionary Court to five years and six months in prison, along with social deprivations. He has also been sentenced to a 10-year ban on teaching and conducting research at universities as an additional punishment.

=== Fourth imprisonment (After the ceasefire between Iran and Israel due to opposition to the continued nuclear activities of the Islamic Republic of Iran) ===
Sajjad Sadeghi was arrested by security agencies in Tehran on June 25, 2025 in the aftermath of the ceasefire between Israel and the Islamic Republic, for his support for the destruction of Iran's nuclear facilities. He is an opponent of the use of nuclear energy, even for peaceful purposes.

== Iranian Theory of International Relations: Neo Cold War ==
Based on developments in the international system, a theory called the Neo Cold War has been proposed in Iranian universities, which Sajjad Sadeghi claim can better analyze international events. Accordingly, a unified power bloc has been formed in the international system, with the United States and its allies in that power bloc, trying to keep the current international order and the current situation unchanged (status quo). Also, in the current international system, there are a number of actors who are dissatisfied with the current distribution of power. Actors such as Russia, China, Iran, the Axis of Resistance, etc. According to this theory, these actors, dissatisfied with the current state of the international system(status quo), are continuously disrupting international order and peace in order to blackmail the power bloc that seeks to maintain the current status quo. According to this theory, disaffected actors who have until now acted individually are uniting in alliances like the BRICS. And if they can put aside their differences, we will soon see the emergence of a unified power bloc called the Bloc of Disaffected. Thus, a new bipolar system will be formed, one pole of which will be formed by the power bloc "supporting the current status quo" including the United States and its allies, and the other pole will be formed by the power bloc "dissatisfied with the current status quo" including Russia, China, Iran, etc. This will be the beginning of a new era of the Cold War. If this happens, the post post-Cold War era will end.

== Bibliography ==
- Modeling of the Speeches of Iranian Presidents in the UNGA (1980-2024), Allemeh Tabataba'i University press, 2025.
- Pathology of knowledge Acquired Through Education at Iranian International Relations, Allemeh Tabataba'i University press, 2025.
- Iranian view on Asian politics and neighborhood; Approach measurement of Iranian scientific-research articles 2019-2022, National Defense University press, 2024.
- Examining the Research Approaches of Iranian International Relations Articles: Review of Scientific Research Articles Published from March 21, 2021 to March 20, 2022، Ferdowsi University press, 2024.
- Iranian view on BRICS and developments in international system: Examining the research approaches of Iranian scientific-research articles on international relations, Tehran University press, 2024.
- Critical Theories, International Relations and Iranian International Relations: Kissinger Syndrome, Allemeh Tabataba'i University press, 2023.
- The United States and Theorization in International Relations: A Critical Perception of Components Including Normative System, Power Politics and Science Production, Guilan University press, 2022.
