= Esfandiar Maasoumi =

Esfandiar Maasoumi (born March 5, 1950) is an econometrician and an economist. He is a distinguished professor at Emory University. He received his bachelor's and master's degrees from the London School of Economics. He earned his Ph.D.in 1977, also from the London School of Economics. He is fellow of the Royal Statistical Society, a Fellow of the American Statistical Association, and a fellow of the Journal of Econometrics. He is ranked in the Econometricians Hall of Fame. Maasoumi has served as Editor of Econometric Reviews since 1987. He has influential contributions in forecasting, specification analysis, information theory, multidimensional welfare/wellbeing, mobility and inequality. He has published more than 100 articles and reviews in the leading journals in economics. Ph.d advisor: Denis Sargan Citizen: US and Iran Born: Tehran, Iran Mother: Sharifeh Fakhri Father: Ahmad Daughter: Maya Amitis, born on May 19, 1982. High school: Hadaf III, Tehran

== Selected publications ==
- Maasoumi, Esfandiar (May 1978). "A Modified Stein-like Estimator for the Reduced Form Coefficients of Simultaneous Equations". Econometrica. 46 (3): 695–703. doi:10.2307/1914241. JSTOR 1914241.
- Maasoumi, Esfandiar (July 1986). "The Measurement and Decomposition of Multidimensional Inequality". Econometrica. 54 (4): 991–997. doi:10.2307/1912849. JSTOR 1912849.
- Linton, Oliver; Maasoumi, Esfandiar; Whang, Yoon-Jae (July 2005). "Consistent Testing for Stochastic Dominance under General Sampling Schemes". The Review of Economic Studies. 72 (3): 735–765. doi:10.1111/j.1467-937x.2005.00350.x. S2CID 67852953.
- "Consistent Testing for Stochastic Dominance under General Sampling Schemes (Corrigendum)". The Review of Economic Studies. 75: 333–337. January 2008.
- "A Compendium to Information Theory in Economics and Econometrics". Econometric Reviews. 1993.
