= Kamran Elahian =

Iranian-American entrepreneur

- کامران الهیان
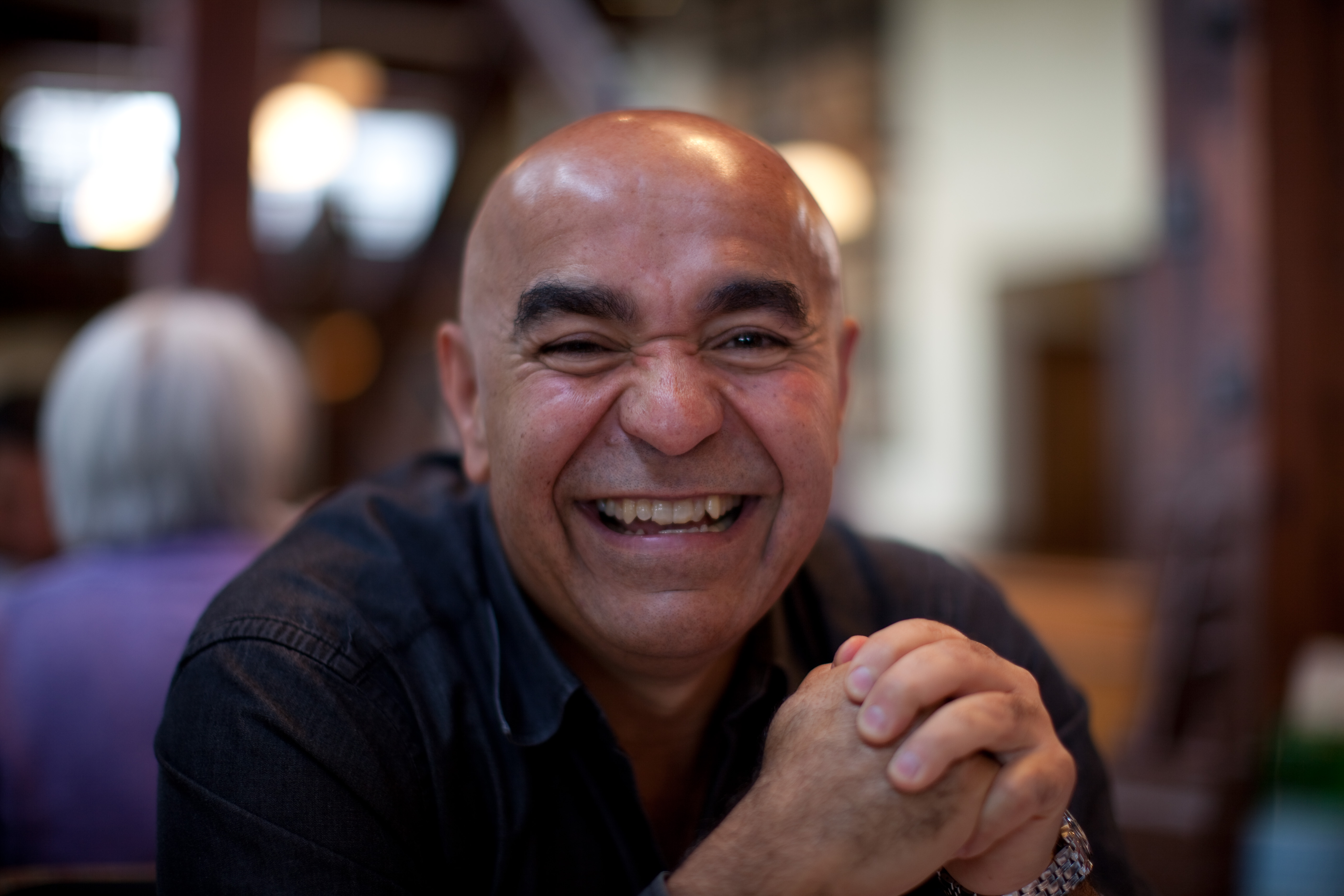
- Born: 1954 (age 71–72); Tehran, Iran
- Occupation: Entrepreneur
- Spouse: Zohre Elahian
- Website: www.kamranelahian.com

Kamran Elahian (Persian: کامران الهیان) is an Iranian-American entrepreneur who is the chairman and founder of Global Innovation Catalyst and advises governments on transitioning out of fossil-based economies. Over his career, he co-founded ten companies and had six exits, three of which were Unicorn IPOs. For 15 years he was Chairman of Global Catalyst Partners, a global VC firm with investments in the U.S., Japan, China, India, Israel and Singapore.
