= University of the Thai Chamber of Commerce =

Private non-profit higher education institution in Bangkok, Thailand

Coordinates: 13°46′43″N 100°33′36″E

- มหาวิทยาลัยหอการค้าไทย
- Motto: Top University in Trade & Services in ASEAN
- Type: Private, non-profit
- Established: 1940 as College of Commerce; 1984 full university status
- President: Associate Professor Thanavath Phonvichai Ph.D.
- Students: 20,000 undergraduate and graduate
- Location: Bangkok, Thailand
- Campus: Urban: Din Daeng District
- Website: http://www.utcc.ac.th

The University of the Thai Chamber of Commerce (UTCC) (Thai: มหาวิทยาลัยหอการค้าไทย) is a private non-profit higher education institution in Bangkok, Thailand. The university's origin dates back to 1940, with the foundation of the College of Commerce in Bangkok. In 1984, the college was granted full university status under its present name.

The university is academically organized into eight schools: business, accountancy, economics, humanities, science, communication arts, engineering, and law. All offer degree programs, in English and Thai, to the doctoral level. The university has strong ties to entrepreneurs in Thailand through its founding body, the Thai Chamber of Commerce. It also serves in various advisory functions to several ASEAN countries. The university's business school is accredited by the US Accreditation Council for Business Schools and Programs.

The university enforces a strict student dress code.

== History ==
The university has the longest history of private higher education in Thailand. At its founding, the College of Commerce offering a six-month program and a two-year program for 300 students. It reopened in 1963, after its closure in December 1941 following the Japanese invasion and occupation of Thailand. On 17 June 1970, the college was formally accredited under the Private College Act. The first bachelor's degree programs were offered in 1967, and in 1973 the college moved to its present location in Bangkok's Din Daeng District. On 24 October 1984, it became a full university.

== Enrollment and faculty ==
As of January 2007, the university had 19,472 undergraduate and 1,710 graduate students enrolled in its various programs.

== Degree programs and campus facilities ==
The university provides bachelor's degrees, master's degrees, and doctoral degree programmes.

A number of programs are linked internationally through student exchange programs with universities in the US, Australia, and Europe. All international classes are taught in English.

== Research centres ==
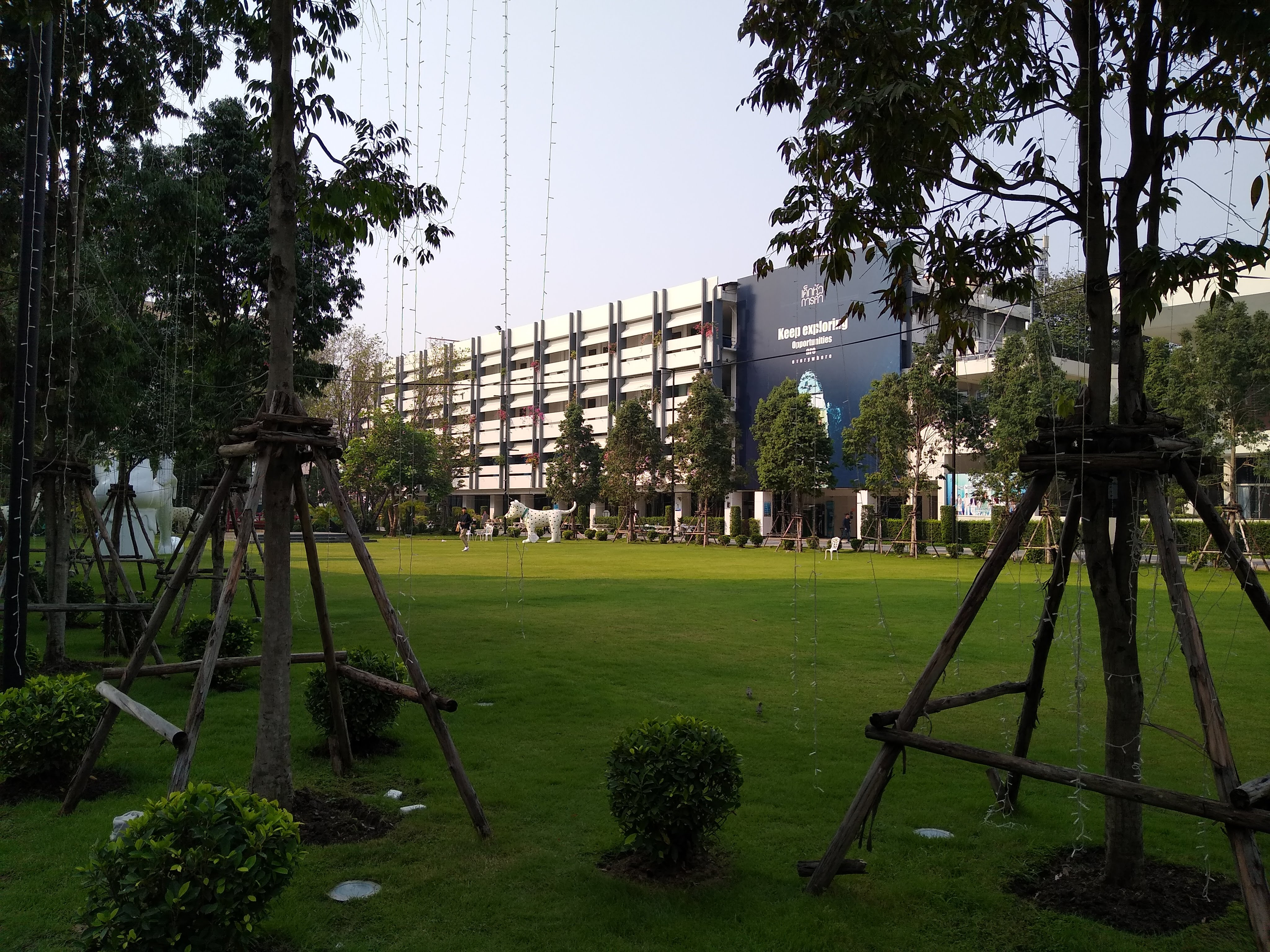
UTCC campus

- Research Institute for Policy Evaluation and Design: Interdisciplinary research with a focus on Southeast Asia
- The UTCC Logistics Research Center
- The Center for Economic and Business Forecasting
- ASEAN Mass Communication Studies and Research Center
- Family Business Enterprise Center
- AEC Strategy Center: Business information research and consultancy with focus on the ASEAN Economic Community
- The Innovation Driven Entrepreneurship (IDE) Center, developing Innovation Driven Entrepreneurs in Thailand and Southeast Asia.

== Notable people ==
- Yodchai Meksuwan, actor, artist
- Phupoom Pongpanu, actor
- Jesdaporn Pholdee, actor
- Chutima Naiyana, Miss Thailand 1987
- Sot Chitalada, boxing athlete
- Itthipat Peeradechapan, entrepreneur
- Nawat Itsaragrisil, producer
- Naiyarat Thanawaigoses, YouTuber, voice actress
- Thanawin Pholcharoenrat, actor
- Wanpichit Nimitparkpoom, actor
