= Branko Kopjar =

American physician

Branko Kopjar is a physician and epidemiologist at the University of Washington. He is best known for his contributions in the 1990s to the field of injury prevention and his later work on spine, cardiovascular, orthopedic and spinal cord injury research. His work has been published in several top journals in the fields of oncology, nephrology public health and neurosurgery resulting in a total of more than 500 articles, reports, reviews and abstracts.

== Education ==
He holds an MD (1987) and MS in biostatistics (1991) from the University of Zagreb, and a PhD in health economics and epidemiology from the University of Oslo (1996). Dr. Kopjar also completed a post-graduate Fellowship in Health Services Research.

== Career ==
Prior to joining the University of Washington, Dr. Kopjar served as the Research Director for the Norwegian Foundation for Health Services Research, Head of the Section for Preventive Medicine at the Norwegian Institute of Public Health and as a Ministerial Adviser on health policy to two European governments. He was a participant at the World Injury Conference meetings held in Melbourne, Australia in 1995.

One of his most notable publications include a 2002 sole-authorship which showed that Azithromycin is effective in patients with chronic bronchitis. The findings were published in the Journal of Antimicrobial Chemotherapy.

A year later, he partnered with the Veterans Health Administration to conduct a study on nearly 9,000 patients with coronary heart disease. The research examined how adherence to prescribed statins impacted secondary prevention of coronary heart disease.

Dr. Kopjar was a co-author on a 2013 paper which for the first time showed that surgical decompression is an effective procedure to treat cervical spondylotic myelopathy, a common disease of the spine that can lead to paralysis.

In 2014, Dr. Kopjar was honored with a five-year Distinguished Professorship to the Orthopaedic Department at Chongqing Medical University in Chongqing, P.R. China., a World Health Organization-recognized teaching hospital. During his distinguished professorship in China, Dr. Kopjar was also the program director for the Executive Master of Public Health program at the University of Washington School of Public Health. The MPH program is consistently ranked as one of the top 10 in the United States. Throughout this time, he continued publishing scientific papers across various therapeutic areas. For example, he was a co-author on a 2016 paper which showed that surgical intervention, in combination with radiation and chemotherapy, improves outcomes for patients whose cancer has metastasized to the spinal cord.

From 2012 to 2021 Dr. Kopjar was the Study Director for the world's largest spinal cord injury trial, RISCIS. The project was a randomized double-blinded Phase 3 trial funded by the AO Foundation, United States Department of Defense, Christopher and Dana Reeve Foundation and other organizations. The trial enrolled and administered the drug Riluzole to 193 research subjects within 12 hours of traumatic cervical spinal cord injury. The Principal Investigator for the trial was renowned neurosurgeon Michael Fehlings from the University of Toronto. Other leading spine surgeons that are, or have been, involved in RISCIS include Bizhan Aarabi, Nicholas Theodore and Charles Tator. The trial design was presented by Dr. Kopjar during a meeting of the Seattle Science Foundation in 2017. Interim trial results were presented at the Congress of Neurosurgeons 2018 annual meeting. Partially coinciding with his time on the RISCIS trial, Dr. Kopjar also served as a visiting consultant to the Royal Orthopaedic Hospital, a National Health Service hospital in Northfield, England. Also during this time, in 2018, he was also a study author on a 2018 publication in the Journal of Neurosurgery which led to a label change for i-FACTOR™ Peptide Enhanced Bone Graft.

Dr. Kopjar has previously served as a consultant to the FDA's Orthopaedic and Rehabilitation Devices panel.

In 2020, Dr. Kopjar, along with Drs. Edward. T Davis and Joseph Pagkalos, published a paper on the effects of bearing surfaces on the survival of cementless and hybrid total hip arthroplasty (THA). The paper was a culmination of a multi-year effort that involved analyzing more than 420,000 primary THAs. Clinicians had for years speculated on the likelihood that bearing surface does in fact impact the long-term patient outcomes. THA is one of the most commonly performed surgical procedures in the world as more than 5% of people will undergo the procedure by the age of 80.

In 2021, Dr. Kopjar was a co-author on a publication in The Lancet Neurology which highlighted the findings of a multi-center, Phase 3 trial that was conducted to research the drug riluzole for the treatment of cervical spondylotic myelopathy.

In 2025, he was a co-author on New England Journal of Medicine and JAMA publications on the efficacy and safety of Lorundrostat, an aldosterone synthase inhibitor currently being research for the treatment of hypertension. Subsequently, in 2026, Dr. Kopjar was a co-author on a publication of the trial results of the same drug in the context of the chronic kidney disease patient population.

He has been awarded the John M. Eisenberg Best Paper Award issued by the Agency for Healthcare Research and Quality, and the 2013, 2014, 2015 and 2016 Best Paper or Outstanding Paper Awards issued by the North American Spine Society. He is a member of the North American Spine Society's Performance Measurement Committee and its Outcomes Compendium Task Force.

Dr. Kopjar is a Fellow of the American College of Epidemiology. and of the academy of Translational Medicine.

He is an emeritus faculty member in the Master of Health Administration program at the University of Washington, one of the top 10 MHA programs in the United States.
