= Reza Jalli =

Iranian radiology researcher

Reza Jalli PhD
- رضا جلی
- Education: Shiraz University of Medical Sciences
- Occupations: Professor of radiology, researcher
- Known for: Establishing and heading the Department of Radiology Affairs at Shiraz University of Medical Sciences

Reza Jalli (Persian: رضا جلی), also known as Professor Jalli or Dr. Jalli, is an Iranian radiologist, researcher, and professor who serves as the head of the Radiology Department at Shiraz University of Medical Sciences (SUMS). He is credited with founding the Office of Radiology Affairs, the first of its kind at SUMS.

== Office of Radiology Affairs ==
Jalli pioneered the establishment of the Office of Radiology Affairs at SUMS. Based initially at Namazi Hospital, the office aims to ensure justifiable and appropriate diagnostic imaging usage, timely diagnosis, patient radiation safety, and prevention of unnecessary exposure.

== Training and continuing education ==
Jalli has organized conferences and training frameworks to support ongoing professional development for radiology technicians and radiologists. Initiatives include refresher programs and advanced imaging seminars.

== Research publications ==
Jalli has contributed significantly to international scholarly literature, particularly in chest imaging and CT scan diagnostics. Highlighted among his publications:

- Jalli R, Akhavan M, Mohammadian M. "Evaluating diagnostic accuracy of color Doppler sonography in carpal tunnel syndrome." *Isfahan Medical School Journal*, 2016;33(366):2327–2332.
- Jalli R, Mojtahedi I, Kamali K, Akbarnajad S, Mehdavi M. "Assessing CT scan accuracy in differentiating benign vs malignant solitary pulmonary nodules compared to pathology – a prospective study." *Isfahan Medical Faculty Journal*, 2007;25(85):72–79.

== See also ==
- Shiraz University of Medical Sciences
- Radiology
