= Terasaki =

Terasaki (written: 寺崎) is a Japanese surname. Notable people with the surname include:

- Hisako Terasaki (born 1928), Japanese-American etcher
- Kōgyō Terasaki (1866–1919), Japanese painter
- Paul Terasaki (1929–2016), Japanese-American academic
- Yuka Terasaki (寺崎 裕香, born 1983), Japanese voice actress, actress and singer
