= Amir Manbachi =

Iranian-Canadian academic and researcher

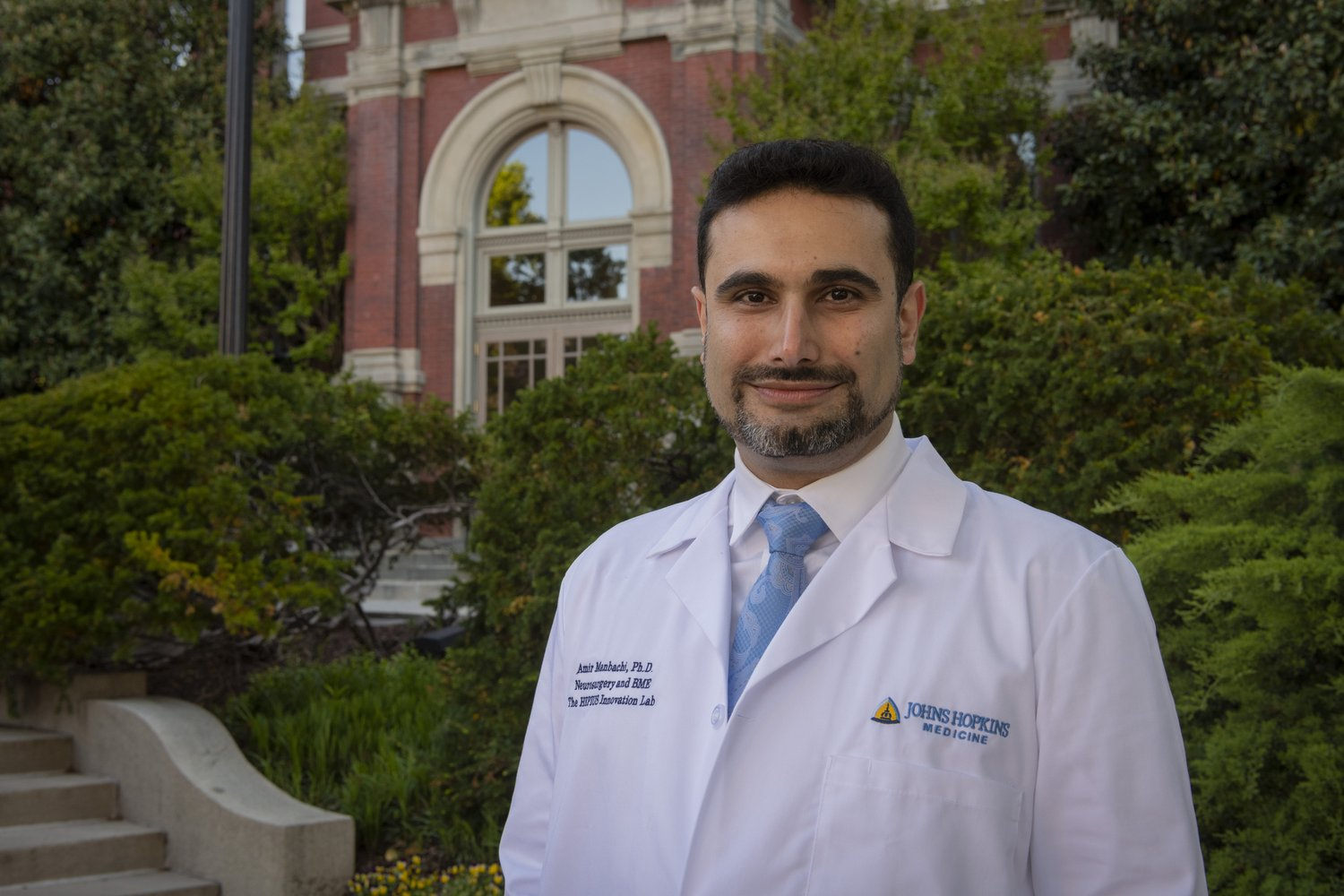
- Occupation: Professor

Academic background
- Education: University of Toronto

Academic work
- Discipline: Biomedical Engineering; Medical Devices; Ultrasound
- Institutions: Johns Hopkins University
- Notable works: Towards Ultrasound-guided Spinal Fusion Surgery (2018)

Amir Manbachi (Persian: امیر منبع چی) is an Iranian-born, Canadian-American academic and researcher, currently working as an Associate Professor of Neurosurgery and Biomedical Engineering at Johns Hopkins School of Medicine, and known for his work in Medical Ultrasound. He is the co-founder and current director of HEPIUS Innovation Lab at Johns Hopkins University.

== Academic Biography ==
Manbachi is of Iranian descent. He attended the University of Toronto, where he completed his bachelor's degree in applied sciences (BASc) in the Engineering Science (Physics) program. Later, he obtained his master's degree and a PhD in biomedical engineering at the University of Toronto. During his third year as a PhD candidate, he, along with his university advisers, established Spinesonics Medical which developed a sensor designed to aid in vertebral screw insertion procedures. They received $850,000 of grant funding to support their research and development efforts.

In 2016, Manbachi joined the Department of Biomedical Engineering at Johns Hopkins University as a research faculty member. At Johns Hopkins University, he co-founded HEPIUS Innovation Labs and now serves as its director. He also served as an associate director of the Center for Bioengineering Innovation and Design.

In 2018, Manbachi and Nao J. Gamo began researching ultrasound technology with the potential to target and "burn" brain tumors. They received a total of $750,000 in grant funding from Hopkins, Maryland Technology Development Corp., and the Wallace H. Coulter Foundation for this purpose.

In 2020, Manbachi and a team co-led by Nicholas Theodore at Johns Hopkins Medicine were awarded a $13.5M grant from the Defense Advanced Research Projects Agency (DARPA) to research wearable and implantable ultrasound technologies for spinal cord injury patients.

In 2022, Manbachi received Baltimore Business Journal's 40 under 40 award, and secured a Johns Hopkins Discovery award.

In 2023, the HEPIUS Innovation Lab at Hopkins, led by Manbachi, received a Food and Drug Administration Breakthrough Device Designation for a novel ultrasound imaging implant.

In 2024, he received American Institute of Ultrasound in Medicine's Peter Arger Excellence in Medical Student Education Award as well as the Hisako Terasaki's Young Innovator Award.

== Musical activity ==
Manbachi has performed Persian classical music as a Tombak player. While studying engineering at the University of Toronto, he performed with The Chakavak Ensemble, in Canada. In 2007, The Varsity reported that Manbachi had played the Tombak since childhood and that Chakavak had performed at Toronto's Harbourfront Centre in a program inspired by the poetry of Rumi. In 2026, he was listed as the Tombak player for Soul of Persia at the Asia North Festival in Baltimore.

== Awards and recognition ==
- 40 under 40 by Baltimore Business Journal
- Hisako Terasaki's Young Innovator Award 2024
- AIUM's Peter Arger Excellence in Medical Student Education Award 2024
- University of Toronto's Engineering Alumni Network (EAN) Research & Innovation Award 2024
- University of Toronto's 2015 Inventor of the year award
- Robert B. Pond Sr. Excellence in Teaching Excellence Award, Johns Hopkins University, Whiting School of Engineering
- Johns Hopkins Inst for Clinical and Translational Research's KL2 Clinical Research Scholar, 2020
- FDA Breakthrough designation pathway awarded to his MUSIC device invention, 2023

== Selected publications ==
- Manbachi, Amir; Cobbold, Richard S C (November 2, 2011). "Development and Application of Piezoelectric Materials for Ultrasound Generation and Detection". Ultrasound. 19 (4): 187–196. doi:10.1258/ult.2011.011027. S2CID 56655834 – via CrossRef.
- Abramson, Haley G.; Curry, Eli J.; Mess, Griffin; Thombre, Rasika; Kempski-Leadingham, Kelley M.; Mistry, Shivang; Somanathan, Subhiksha; Roy, Laura; Abu-Bonsrah, Nancy; Coles, George; Doloff, Joshua C.; Brem, Henry; Theodore, Nicholas; Huang, Judy; Manbachi, Amir (February 2, 2022). "Automatic detection of foreign body objects in neurosurgery using a deep learning approach on intraoperative ultrasound images: From animal models to first in-human testing". Frontiers in Surgery. 9 1040066. doi:10.3389/fsurg.2022.1040066. PMC 9748097. PMID 36532130.
- Aghabaglou, Fariba; Ainechi, Ana; Abramson, Haley; Curry, Eli; Kaovasia, Tarana Parvez; Kamal, Serene; Acord, Molly; Mahapatra, Smruti; Pustavoitau, Aliaksei; Smith, Beth; Azadi, Javad; Son, Jennifer K.; Suk, Ian; Theodore, Nicholas; Tyler, Betty M.; Manbachi, Amir (October 2, 2022). "Ultrasound monitoring of microcirculation: An original study from the laboratory bench to the clinic". Microcirculation. 29 (6–7) e12770. doi:10.1111/micc.12770. PMC 9786257. PMID 35611457.
- Kempksi Leadingham, K.M.; Abramson, H.G.; Perdomo-Pantoja, A.; Thombre, R.; Liu, J.; Norman, M.; Chavez, F.; Morrison, K.; Suk, I.; Gordon, C.; Armand, M.; Manbachi, A. (2022). "Design of a Custom Flexible Ultrasound Transducer as an Implantable Cranial Sensor for Long-Term Post-Operative Monitoring of Brain Tumor Regrowth". 2022 IEEE International Ultrasonics Symposium (IUS). pp. 1–4. doi:10.1109/IUS54386.2022.9958345. ISBN 978-1-6654-6657-8. S2CID 254155937.
- Routkevitch, Denis; Hersh, Andrew M.; Kempski, Kelley M.; Kerensky, Max; Theodore, Nicholas; Thakor, Nitish V.; Manbachi, Amir (October 2, 2022). "FlowMorph: Morphological Segmentation of Ultrasound-Monitored Spinal Cord Microcirculation". 2022 IEEE Biomedical Circuits and Systems Conference (BioCAS). Vol. 2022. pp. 610–614. doi:10.1109/biocas54905.2022.9948639. ISBN 978-1-6654-6917-3. PMC 9870043. PMID 36695674.
- Kerensky, Max; Paul, Abhijit; Routkevitch, Denis M.; Hersh, Andrew; Kempski Leadingham, Kelley M; Thakor, Nitish V.; Theodore, Nicholas; Manbachi, Amir (January 5, 2024). "Tethered spinal cord tension assessed via ultrasound elastography in computational and intraoperative human studies". Nature Communications Medicine. 2024 (1): 4. doi:10.1038/s43856-023-00430-6. PMC 10770351. PMID 38182729.
- Tsehay, Yohannes; Zeng, Yinuo; Weber-Levine, Carly; Awosika, Tolu; Kerensky, Max; Hersh, Andrew; Ou, Ze; Jiang, Kelly; Bhimreddy, Meghana; Bauer, Stuart J; Theodore, John N; Quiroz, Victor M; Suk, Ian; Alomari, Safran; Sun, Junfeng; Tong, Shanbao; Thakor, Nitish V; Doloff, Joshua C; Theodore, Nicholas; Manbachi, Amir (July 2023). "Low-Intensity Pulsed Ultrasound Neuromodulation of a Rodent's Spinal Cord Suppresses Motor Evoked Potentials" IEEE Trans Biomed Eng. 2023 Jul;70(7):1992-2001. doi: 10.1109/TBME.2022.3233345. Epub 2023 Jun 19. PMID 37018313; PMC10510849.

== Bibliography ==
- Manbachi, Amir; M. Kempski Leadingham, Kelley; J. Curry, Eli (28 November 2022). The Abundant Promise of Ultrasound in Neurosurgery: A Broad Overview and Thoughts on Ethical Paths to Realizing Its Benefits. ISBN 9781510657250.
- Manbachi, Amir (27 May 2018). Towards Ultrasound-guided Spinal Fusion Surgery. Springer International Publishing. ISBN 9783319806648.
