= Yashar Ali =

American journalist (born 1979)

- Born: Yashar Ali Hedayat; November 23, 1979 (age 46); Chicago, Illinois, U.S.

Yashar Ali (born Yashar Ali Hedayat; November 23, 1979) is an American journalist who has contributed to HuffPost, NBC News, and New York magazine. In 2019, Ali was included in Time magazine's list of the most influential people on the internet, in part due to his large Twitter presence.

== Early life and education ==
Yashar Ali Hedayat (Persian: یاشار علی هدایت) was born into an Iranian family in Chicago. He grew up in Oak Park, Illinois, and attended Holy Cross High School in River Grove. Ali later moved to Los Angeles, working as a television production assistant on shows like E.R. and Chicago Hope.

== Career ==
=== Politics ===
Following his stint working in TV, Ali worked as a volunteer on Kevin Feldman's unsuccessful campaign to unseat United States Representative Henry Waxman, and then on Steve Westly’s campaign for Governor of California. Through Hassan Nemazee, Ali was introduced to Terry McAuliffe, who secured him a job on Hillary Clinton's 2008 presidential campaign. After Clinton was defeated by Barack Obama in the Democratic primary, Ali relocated from Los Angeles to San Francisco, securing a position on Gavin Newsom's 2010 gubernatorial campaign. Newsom dropped out of the race early, after which Ali was appointed Newsom's deputy chief of staff.

Through his work in Newsom's office, Ali befriended oil heiress Ariadne Getty, and began borrowing large sums of money from her. She later sued Ali to recover the $179,000 she had loaned him. Ali subsequently agreed to begin repaying the loan in monthly installments of $500, but eventually defaulted. As of 2023, according to the Los Angeles Times, Ali was being sued for $230,000 by a debt collector seeking to recover the loans plus accumulated interest.

=== Kathy Griffin ===
After departing his employment with Newsom, Ali returned to Los Angeles and worked as a cook and personal assistant for Kathy Griffin in exchange for boarding and use of a car. In 2019, Griffin asked Ali to leave her home. According to Joan Walsh, Griffin was "too intimidated" by Ali to ask him to leave earlier, though she had desired he do so. Speaking of his time with Griffin, Ali has said that he has "grappled a lot with entering into codependent relationships of all sorts".

=== Twitter and journalism ===
While working with Griffin, Ali began building a Twitter following. He has variously been described as a "quasi-journalist", "gossip columnist", "journalist" and "social media influencer".

According to The San Francisco Chronicle, Ali also worked as a federal lobbyist and has given thousands of dollars to Democratic candidates. After working in California Democratic Party politics, Ali moved to New York City and contributed to multiple media publications.

On August 4, 2017, Ali reported allegations that Fox News commentator Eric Bolling had sent unsolicited lewd text messages and photos to three female colleagues at Fox News or Fox Business Network. In response to the report, Bolling filed a $50 million defamation lawsuit in New York against Ali. Ali said he stood behind the accuracy of his story and would protect his sources.

In October 2020, Ali reported allegations that the mayor of Los Angeles, Eric Garcetti, witnessed sexual misconduct by his top aide, Rick Jacobs, but took no action. Within this piece, Ali disclosed that he had been forcibly kissed by Jacobs multiple times. Garcetti's nomination for United States Ambassador to India was stalled in regards to these allegations, but was later confirmed by the U.S. Senate.

On February 12, 2021, Ali reported that the Federal Bureau of Investigation had been actively investigating allegations against Lincoln Project co-founder John Weaver. Weaver had been accused of sexual misconduct and workplace abuse by numerous men.

On March 16, 2021, Ali reported that television personality Sharon Osbourne had allegedly used racist and homophobic slurs against several of her co-workers for years. This included allegations that she called Julie Chen a "wonton" and "slanty-eyes". Osbourne later left The Talk due to these allegations.

On June 9, 2021, Los Angeles magazine published an in-depth profile on Ali's background and rise to fame written by journalist Peter Kiefer, who interviewed Ali as part of the story. The piece explored the extent of Ali's vast connections in politics and the entertainment industry, and reported several allegations against Ali, documenting several personal relationships with wealthy individuals which ended in furor over financial manipulation or misconduct by Ali, as well as raising suspicions about Ali's journalistic sources, charitable fundraising techniques, and personal bias towards targets of his investigations. On June 7, 2022, writer Parker Molloy published an article in which Ali rejected many of the allegations put forth by Kiefer. Additionally, Ali criticized the journalistic process of the Kiefer article, specifically claiming that he was not informed of the claims against him, and that there were many factual errors within the piece itself. In June 2022, Ali sued the publication for defamation and promissory fraud. Los Angeles County Judge Lynne M. Hobbs dismissed the lawsuit and ordered Ali to pay $43,525, including the defendant's lawyer fees.

== Personal life ==
Ali describes himself as a Catholic, having converted from Shia Islam.

Ali self-identifies as a strong opponent of Scientology, describing it as a “dangerous, criminal cult”; he has been a guest on the podcast Scientology: Fair Game hosted by Leah Remini and Mike Rinder in the past. He is openly gay. He is well known for his love of elephants, and often posts content related to them. According to Ali, he has ADHD and depression, and has a strained relationship with his family.

During the COVID-19 pandemic and ensuing financial crisis, Ali offered direct financial support through services such as Venmo to assist people in need.

== See also ==
- LGBT culture in New York City
- List of LGBT people in New York City
- New Yorkers in journalism
