= Mohammad Khalil Khalili Shirazi =

- Born: Shiraz, Iran
- Died: Shiraz, Iran
- Other names: Khan of Rajabad and Fathabad
- Citizenship: Iranian
- Occupation: Merchant
- Notable work: Khalili Hospital of Shiraz
- Website: https://gsia.sums.ac.ir/en/page/18735/Khalili-Hospital

Mohammad Khalil Khalili Shirazi (Persian: محمد خلیلی شیرازی) was a prominent merchant from Shiraz, Iran. Exact details about his birth and death are unknown. He established a charitable specialized eye hospital in a large garden known as Khalili in central Shiraz and donated it to Shiraz University of Medical Sciences. The hospital, which continues to expand, still bears his name Kalili Huspital.

== Biography ==
Khalili was born in Shiraz and lived in his private residence on a street that was later named after him. Due to the growing prevalence of eye diseases such as trachoma, and the need for a specialized hospital for treating eye, ear, nose, and throat conditions in Shiraz, he decided to build the Khalili Educational and Medical Center in 1966 (1345 SH). He allocated land for the project east and downstream from his home, on the western side of Namazi Hospital in Shiraz.

The hospital, covering about 2,500 m², was built with full scientific and technical equipment and endowed to Shiraz University of Medical Sciences. Over time, it expanded considerably and is now known as Khalili Hospital of Shiraz. It is also worth noting that his residence, now known as Bagh Khalili, has become one of Shiraz’s tourist attractions.
