= Behnam Kamrani =

Iranian artist (b. 1968)

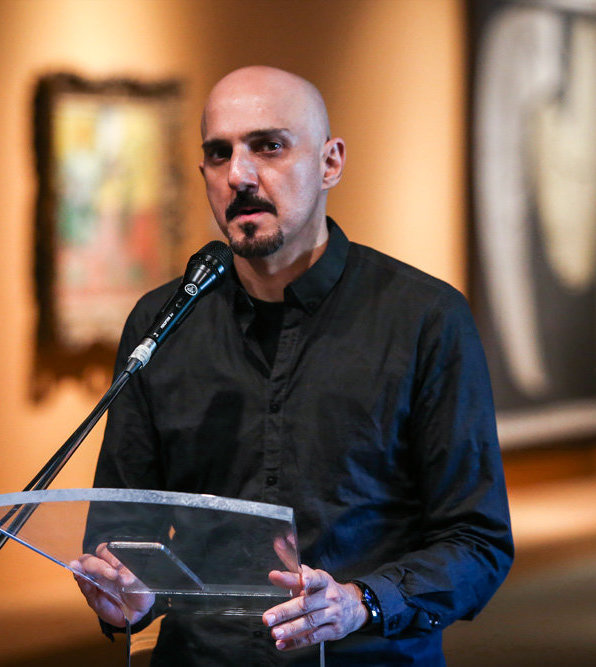
- Kamrani at the unveiling of the book "Overview of Foreign Works" from the collection of the Tehran Museum of Contemporary Art
- Born: 1968 (age 57–58); Shiraz, Iran
- Education: University of Tehran (BA), Tehran University of Art (MA, PhD)
- Known for: Painting, Sculpture, Curating, Writing, Art Criticism

Behnam Kamrani (Persian: بهنام کامرانی; born 1968 in Shiraz, Iran) is an Iranian painter, sculptor, visual artist, curator, writer, and art critic. He is considered one of the prominent contemporary artists active in Iran's academic and professional art scenes.

== Early life and education ==
Kamrani was born in 1968 in Shiraz. His father, Ali Mohammad Kamrani, held a master's degree in law and was active in education and sports. His mother, Sorayya Pahlevanpur, also worked in education and was Kamrani's first guide and motivator in art. After completing his primary and secondary education in Shiraz, he began medical studies at Shiraz University of Medical Sciences but eventually left to pursue painting, his true passion.

He earned his B.A. in Painting from the Faculty of Fine Arts at the University of Tehran in 1995. He later obtained an M.A. in Painting from Tehran University of Art in 1999 and completed a PhD in Art Research in 2008. His doctoral dissertation focused on miniature illustrations in traditional Persian medical manuscripts.

== Career ==
Behnam Kamrani is a faculty member at the University of Art in Tehran and a permanent member of the Iranian Society of Painters. He also serves on the editorial board of the quarterly journal Art Tomorrow.

He has held over 14 solo exhibitions and participated in more than 300 group exhibitions in Iran, France, Italy, Germany, Spain, Japan, China, Armenia, Turkey, Syria, Jordan, the United States, Switzerland, and Greece.

As a curator, Kamrani has organized exhibitions in galleries such as Shirin, Mohsen, Aun, Iranshahr, Vista, Vesal Shirazi, as well as the Niavaran Cultural Center and international platforms like the Shanghai Biennale.

== Selected solo exhibitions ==
- 2015 – Always (with Banafshe Hemmati), 26 Gallery, Tehran
- 2014 – Where It Doesn't Matter Where!, Aun Gallery, Tehran
- 2013 – 2013 Caspian Biennal /Baku/Azerbaijan
- 2013 – Fire in…, Aun Gallery, Tehran
- 2013 – Video Persi Art /Nature Art biennale /Gongiu ,Chungnam/ Korea
- 2013 – Peace/Opera gallery/London
- 2013 – Ayyam Gallery/The Young collector auction/Dubai
- 2013 – Opera Gallery/ Dubai
- 2012 – 9th Shanghai Biennale /china
- 2012 – Alison Williams/New York-USA
- 2011 – Padiglione esterno /Iran and India video art/Rome-Italy
- 2011 – Unified in Diversity/Total Arts gallery/Dubai-UAE
- 2012 – Edge, Aun Gallery, Tehran
- 2010 – Iran Traveling on Banknotes, Aun Gallery, Tehran
- 2007 – New media festival/Chicago,USA
- 2006 – Clothes for Us, Clothes for Gabriel, Khak Gallery, Tehran
- 2004 – Miniature of Paradise, Laleh Gallery, Tehran
- 2000 – Mystical Clothes, Barg Gallery, Tehran

== Group exhibitions ==
Kamrani has participated in major international events such as the 9th Shanghai Biennale (2012), the Caspian Biennale in Baku (2013), the Nature Biennale in South Korea, and group exhibitions in Yerevan, London, and Vienna.

== Publications and writing ==
Kamrani authored the book Painting Workshop, contributed to Iranian school textbooks, and has published numerous articles in journals such as Art Tomorrow, Art Quarterly, Tandis, Bukhara, and Tavoos.

== Awards ==
- 1999 – Winner, First International Drawing Exhibition, Tehran Museum of Contemporary Art
- 2005 – Honorary Diploma, Paris Triennial
- 2010 – Selected Work, Palestine Museum Exhibition

== Memberships and juries ==
Kamrani has served on numerous committees and selection panels, including:

- Jury of Urban Sculpture (2009)
- Damoonfar Biennale (2009)
- National Student Arts Festival (2008)
- Vista Contemporary Art Prize (2018)
- Contemporary Art Museum of Tehran (2001–2006)
- Spiritual Art – Niavaran Cultural Center (2004)
- Comparative Art Research Group – House of Artists (since 2011)
- Council of International Exhibitions – Tehran Museum of Contemporary Art (2004–2006)
