= Bizhan Aarabi =

Iranian-American neurosurgeon

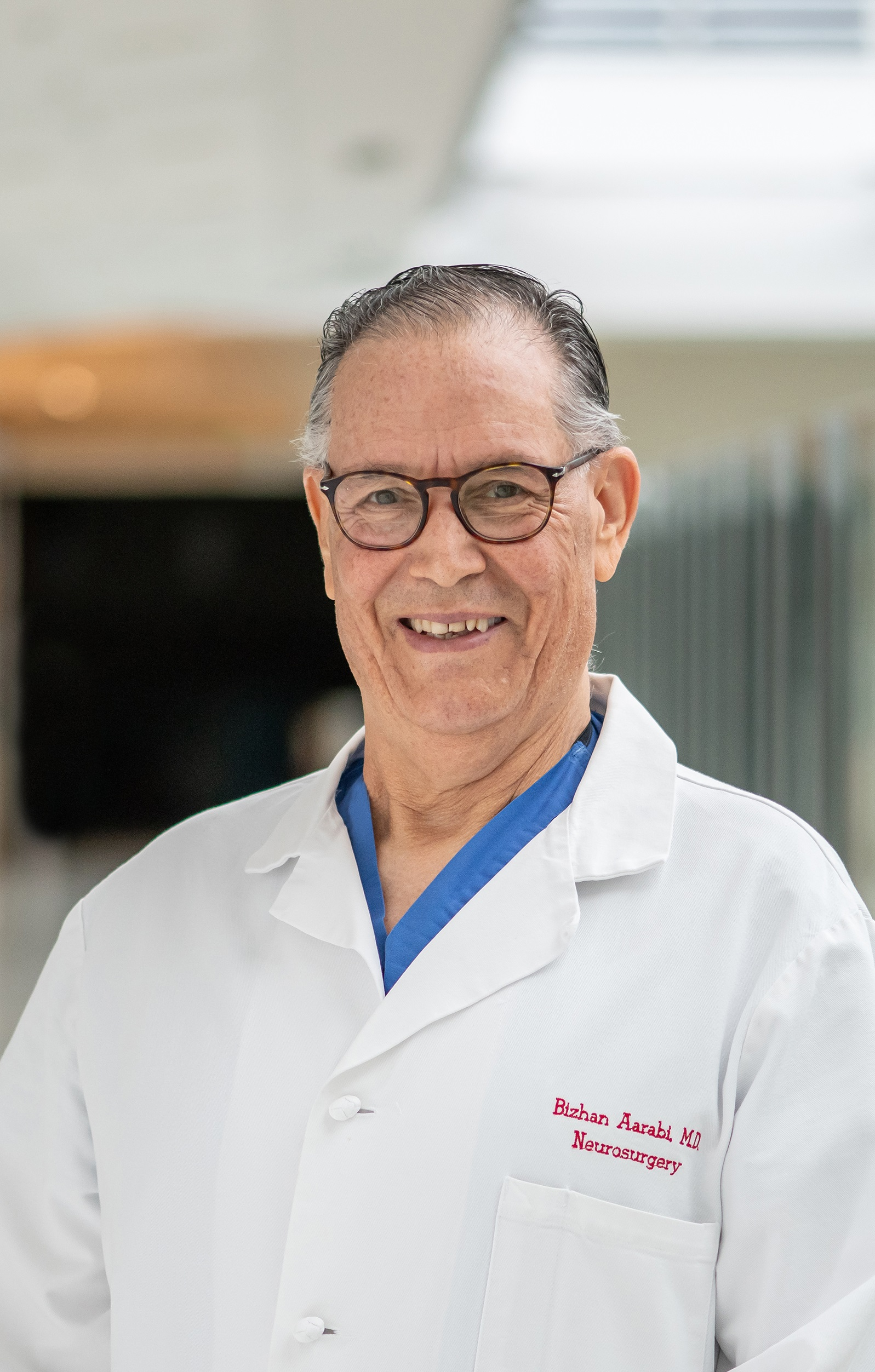
- Born: 1947 (age 78–79); Abadeh, Iran
- Occupations: Neurosurgeon, researcher, author and academic

Academic background
- Education: Pahlavi University

Bizhan Aarabi (Persian: بیژن اعرابی; born 1947) is an Iranian-American neurosurgeon, researcher, author, and academic. He is a professor of neurosurgery at University of Maryland and the Director of Neurotrauma at the R Adams Cowley Shock Trauma Center.

Aarabi's research focuses on the traumatic cervical spinal cord and brain injuries. During the decade spanning from 1980 to 1990, he was involved in cohort studies of soldiers and civilians injured in battle in the Iran-Iraq war. In his later research, he has focused on the analysis of data on traumatic cervical spinal cord injury in the USA. He has written over 180 scientific articles. In 2018, he published the book, Decompressive Craniectomy, co-edited with J. Marc Simard.

1990 the Iranian government gave Aarabi the Medal of Honor and Achievement.

== Early life and education ==
Aarabi was born at Abadeh, Iran in 1947. After completing his Pre-Med at the Pahlavi University, he continued studying at the institute, where he received his MD in 1973. After a year of neurosurgical internship at the Namazi Hospital in Iran, Aarabi moved to the United States, where he completed his postgraduate training at the Cook County Hospital and the Johns Hopkins Hospital; the latter under the supervision of DM Long.

== Career ==
In 1979, Aarabi moved back to Iran, where he joined the Shiraz University of Medical Sciences as an associate professor in neurosurgery, becoming Professor and Chair of the Neurosurgery Department in 1990. Aarabi returned to the United States in 1995 and joined the University of Nebraska Medical Center as an associate professor. He left the University of Nebraska in 2000 to join the University of Maryland, where he was appointed as the Director of Neurotrauma at R Adams Cowley Shock Trauma Center.

=== Research ===
In the beginning of his career, while he was at the Shiraz University of Medical Science, Aarabi's performed cohort studies on infectious and hemorrhagic complications of missile head wounds during the Iran-Iraq War (1980-1988) and published his first book Beyond Coma. Some of his research during this time dealt with identifying predictors of CNS infections, and predictors of traumatic intracranial aneurysms. In 1999, he co-edited a 2 volume book, entitled Missile Wounds of the Head and Neck, with Howard H. Kaufman.

While he was at the University of Nebraska, he worked with Robert Florin and Beverly C Walters on the AANS/CNS mandated Guidelines and Prognosis of Penetrating Brain Injury. Later, in 2013, Aarabi worked with Mark Hadley and Walters to produce AANS/CNS Guidelines for Management of Acute Cervical Spine and Spinal Cord Injuries.

Most of Aarabi's later work has been focused on acute cervical spinal cord injuries and traumatic brain injury. He retrospectively analyzed prospectively collected data on traumatic cervical spinal cord injury. These studies collectively present the dynamic characteristics of intramedullary lesions in cervical SCI. These include the predictors of intramedullary lesion expansion and the significance of intramedullary lesion length on outcome following cervical SCI.

In 2017, Aarabi collaborated with Michael Fehlings in production of A clinical Practice Guideline for the Management of Patients with Acute Spinal Cord Injury. In 2018, he co-edited the book Decompressive Craniectomy.

== Awards and honours ==
- 1990 - Medal of Honor and Achievement, Iranian Government
- 2018 - International Impact Award, National Spinal Cord Injury Association Iran
- 2018 - Endowed Neurotrauma Professorship Chair Award UMSOM

== Publications ==
=== Books ===
- An Introduction to the Treatment of Craniocerebral Battle Wounds (1987)
- Beyond Coma: Brain Death (1993)
- Missile Injuries of the Head and Neck (1999)
- Decompressive Craniectomy (2018)

=== Selected articles ===
- Aarabi B, Akhtar-Danesh N, Chryssikos T, Shanmuganathan K, et al. Efficacy of Ultra-Early (< 12 h), Early (12-24 h), and Late (>24-138.5 h) Surgery with Magnetic Resonance Imaging-Confirmed Decompression in American Spinal Injury Association Impairment Scale Grades A, B, and C Cervical Spinal Cord Injury. J Neurotrauma 27:448-457, 2020
- Aarabi B, Olexa J, Chryssikos T et al. The extent of Spinal Cord Decompression in Motor Complete (American Spinal Injury Association Impairment Scale Grades A and B) Traumatic Spinal Cord Injury Patients: Post-Operative Magnetic Resonance Imaging Analysis of Standard Operative Approaches. J Neurotrauma 36:862-876, 2019.
- Aarabi B, Oner C, Vaccaro AR, Schroeder GD, Akhtar-Danesh N. Application of AOSpine Subaxial Cervical Spine Injury Classification in Simple and Complex Cases. J Orthop Trauma. 2017 Sep;31 Suppl 4:S24-S32.
- Aarabi B, Sansur CA, Ibrahimi DM et al. Intramedullary Lesion Length on Postoperative Magnetic Resonance Imaging is a Strong Predictor of ASIA Impairment Scale Grade Conversion Following Decompressive Surgery in Cervical Spinal Cord Injury. Neurosurgery 80:610-620. 2017
- Le E, Aarabi B, Hersh DS, Shanmuganathan K, et al. Predictors of intramedullary lesion expansion rate on MR images of patients with subaxial spinal cord injury. J Neurosurg 6:1-11 Spine. 2015.
- Aarabi B, Tofighi B, Kufera JA et al. Predictors of outcome in civilian gunshot wounds to the head. J Neurosurg, 120:1138-46. 2014.
- Aarabi B, Mirvis S, Shanmuganathan K et al. Comparative effectiveness of surgical versus nonoperative management of unilateral, nondisplaced, subaxial cervical spine facet fractures without evidence of spinal cord injury: clinical article. J Neurosurg Spine. 2014 Mar;20(3):270-7.
