= Shiraz University of Medical Sciences =

Medical Science University in Iran

Coordinates: 29°37′47.84″N 52°31′25.24″E

- دانشگاه علوم پزشکی شیراز
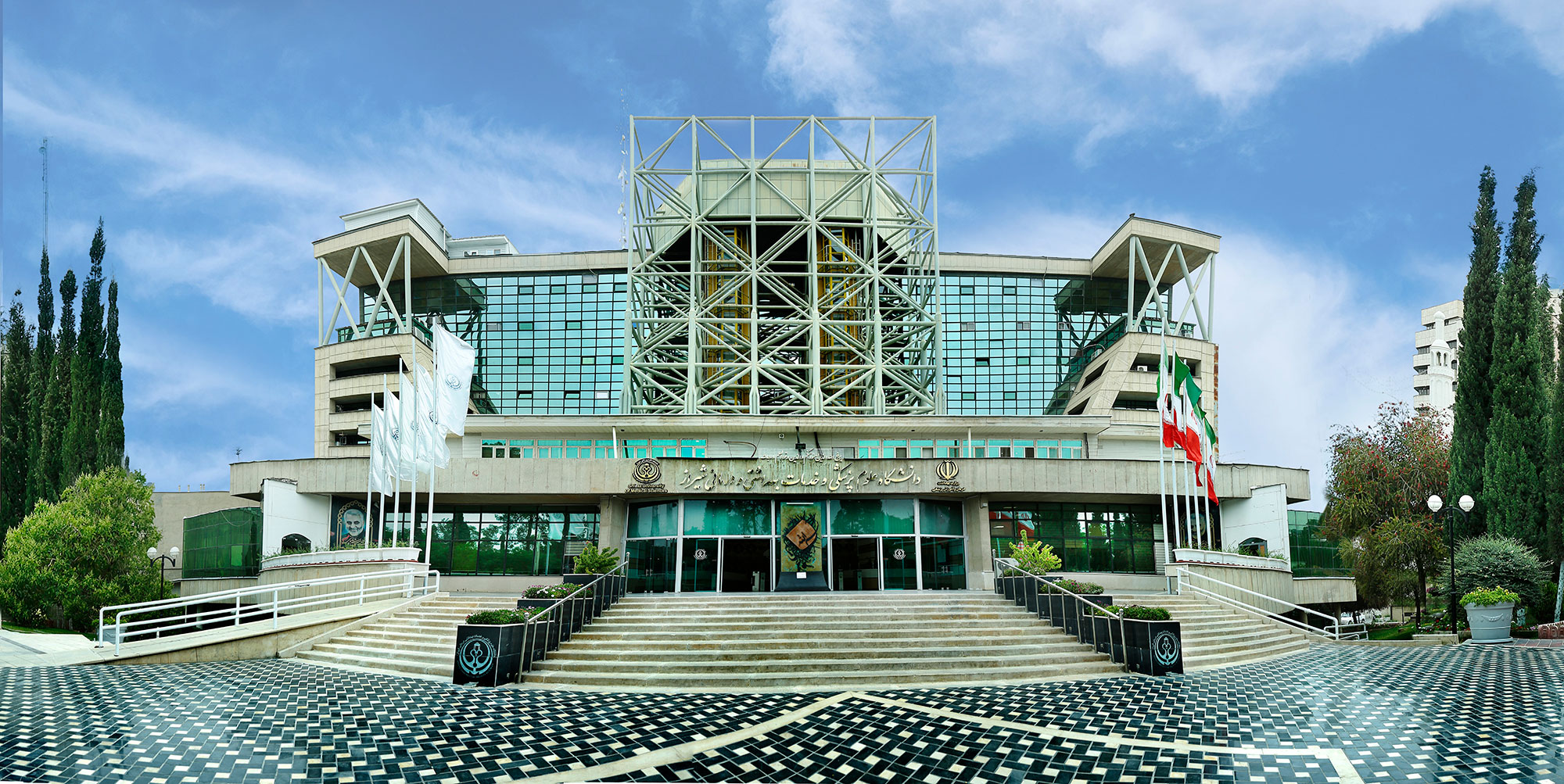
- Former names: Behdari Higher Health Education Center, Pahlavi University (School of Medicine)
- Type: Public
- Established: 1946
- President: Prof. Seyed Basir Hashemi
- Faculty: 1035
- Students: 10000
- Location: Shiraz, Fars, Iran
- Campus: Urban
- Website: www.sums.ac.ir/en
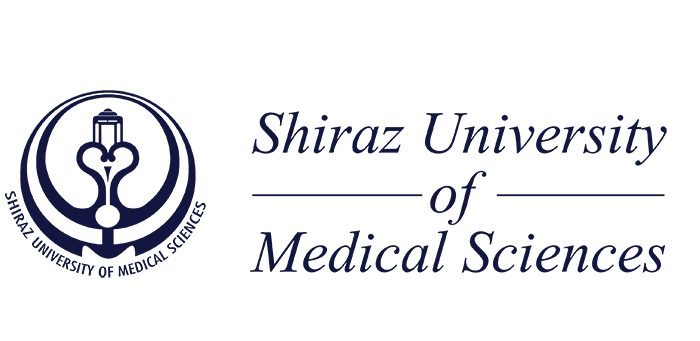

Shiraz University of Medical Sciences (SUMS) (Persian: دانشگاه علوم پزشکی شیراز Dāneshgāh-e Olum Pezeshki-e Shirāz) is a public medical school located in Shiraz, Iran. Since its inauguration in 1946, SUMS has always been ranked among top medical schools in Iran.

University rankings
- SUMS Global Rankings

Global – Overall
- CWTS World: 546 (2025)
- THE World: 601-800 (2026)
- USNWR Global: 801 (2026)

Global – Life sciences and medicine
- QS Life Sciences & Medicine: 451-500 (2026)

Currently, more than 10,000 students are studying in over 200 different disciplines within 17 schools. Iranian students are admitted to SUMS based on their performance in the National Entrance Exam (Konkur) and are enrolled at the university’s main campus. SUMS also offers international degree and non-degree programs to international students at different levels and disciplines, including Doctor of Medicine (M.D.), Bachelor of Medicine and Bachelor of Surgery (MBBS), Doctor of Dental Medicine (D.M.D.), Doctor of Pharmacy (Pharm.D.), B.Sc., M.Sc., Ph.D., Specialty, Subspecialty, Fellowship, and numerous Medical Elective and short-term training programs.

Moreover, SUMS is in charge of healthcare provision in public facilities, and supervising private healthcare providers throughout its appointed regions in Fars province. (Note: Fars province is located at the south west of Iran compromising thirty-seven counties. The healthcare system at this province is managed by five medical universities; that is, Shiraz University of Medical Sciences, Jahrom University of Medical Sciences, Fasa University of Medical Sciences, Larestan University of Medical Sciences, and Gerash University of Medical Sciences. Each university is in charge of the healthcare system at its appointed counties.) SUMS has 45 public hospitals (including 14 teaching hospitals), 2 community health centers in Shiraz, (Note: These health centers are responsible to supervise rural and urban comprehensive health services centers, health posts, and health houses in Shiraz.) and 28 health networks throughout Fars province. (Note: SUMS Health Networks are located in twenty-eight cities in Fars province (each of these cities has one health network), and each supervises hospitals, urban and rural comprehensive health services centers, health posts, and health houses throughout the county where they are located.) The university also supervises 17 private hospitals (including 3 charity hospitals) in Shiraz.

== History ==
Shiraz University of Medical Sciences (SUMS) was founded in 1946 when Shiraz Institute of Higher Health Education (also known as Amouzeshgah-e Alee Behdariye Shiraz) started educating medical experts. In 1949, the facility developed into a medical school which was later governed by Shiraz University-formerly known as Pahlavi University- in 1954.Seven other schools, including the School of Nursing and Midwifery, the School of Dentistry, the School of Nutrition and Food Sciences, the School of Health, the School of Paramedical Sciences, the School of Pharmacy, and the School of Rehabilitation Sciences, were also established in Shiraz within a brief period to train students in various fields allied to medicine.

After the 1979 Islamic Revolution overthrew the Pahlavi dynasty, drastic changes were implemented at all universities. The name of Pahlavi University was immediately changed to Shiraz University.

Following the establishment of the Iranian Ministry of Health and Medical Education, all departments and schools in the medical sciences began operating under the supervision of the newly established ministry. Therefore, these schools changed into new entities and formed independent medical universities in each province. Consequently, the School of Medicine and the other abovementioned schools at Shiraz University created Fars University of Medical Sciences in 1994. In that time, Fars University of Medical Sciences was the only medical school in Fars province and was in charge of providing medical education and healthcare services in public facilities, as well as supervising private healthcare providers throughout Fars province; therefore, following the establishment of other medical schools (Note: Jahrom University of Medical Sciences, Fasa University of Medical Sciences, Larestan University of Medical Sciences, and Gerash University of Medical Sciences) in this province, Fars University of Medical Sciences was renamed Shiraz University of Medical Sciences (SUMS), which is still operating under this name.

== Statistics ==
As of May 2023, SUMS is home to over 900 faculty members and more than 35,000 personnel, who are working at SUMS in different areas, including health, treatment, research, and education. Currently, Over 10,000 students study in a variety of academic disciplines at SUMS teaching facilities and research centers.

The university claims a 10:1 student-to-faculty ratio. The faculty is 56% male and 44% female while the student body is 45% male and 55% female.

Shiraz University of Medical Sciences (SUMS) is not only responsible for training students in medical fields but also manages all public hospitals, clinics, and healthcare centers throughout its appointed counties in Fars province. The private sector of the health system in these regions also operates under direct and indirect surveillance of SUMS. In total, SUMS comprises: 17 schools, 55 active research centers, 6 research incubators, 45 public hospitals (including 14 teaching hospitals), 2 community health centers in Shiraz, and 28 health networks throughout Fars province. 17 private hospitals (including 3 charity hospitals) in Shiraz are also providing services under the supervision of SUMS.

== Schools ==
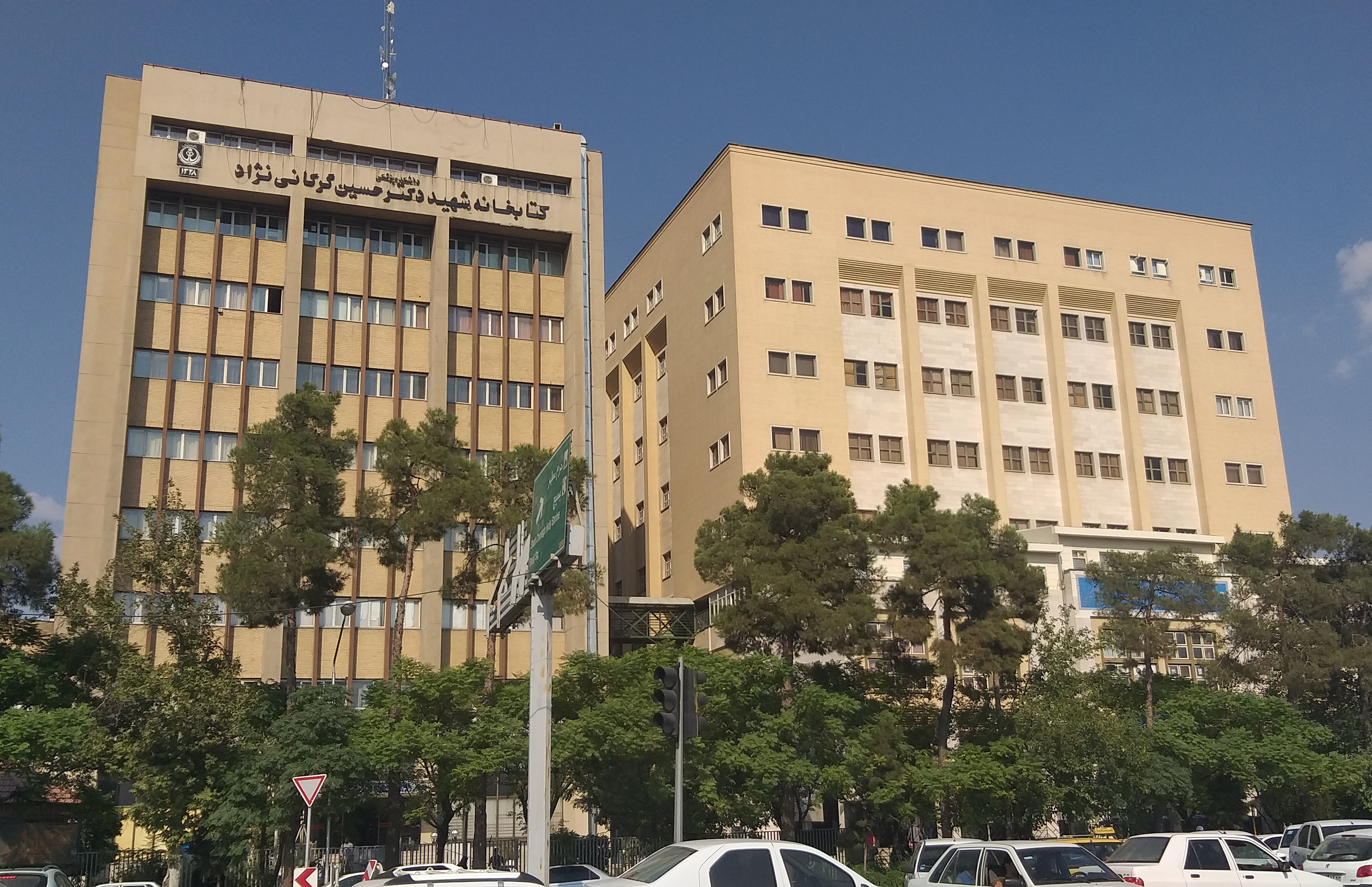
School of Medicine

- School of Medicine (Founded 1949)
- School of Dentistry (1969)
- School of Pharmacy (1989)
- School of Health Sciences (founded 1984 as Kavar College of Health and then, in 1989, as School of Health Sciences in Shiraz)
- School of Rehabilitation Sciences (1977)
- School of Nursing and Midwifery (A.K.A. Fatemeh-e-Zahra School of Nursing and Midwifery; founded 1953 as Nursing Education Center and then, in 1977, as School of Nursing and Midwifery)
- School of Paramedical Sciences (1987)
- School of Nutrition and Food Sciences (1985)
- School of Health Management and Information Sciences (2001)
- School of Advanced Medical Sciences and Technologies (2012)
- Virtual School (2007)
- Estahban School of Paramedical Sciences (2012)
- Abadeh School of Nursing (A.K.A. Hazrat-e-Zahra School of Nursing; 2011)
- Sepidan Healthcare Higher-Education Complex (A.K.A. Bagher-al-Olum Healthcare Higher-Education Complex; 2015)
- Darab School of Paramedical Sciences (2014)
- Lamerd School of Nursing (A.K.A. Umm al-Banin School of Nursing; 2011)
- Mamasani Healthcare Higher-Education Complex (2007)

== Research Centers ==
As part of its commitment to advancing scientific and technological development in medical sciences, Shiraz University of Medical Sciences (SUMS) has established a broad network of specialized research centers devoted to innovation, scientific discovery, and knowledge development across diverse fields of medicine. At present, SUMS hosts 54 research centers, all officially approved by Iran’s Ministry of Health and Medical Education.

== Specialization ==
SUMS is known as the major hub for the following scientific areas in the region:

- Liver Transplantation (major hub in the Middle East)
- Clinical Immunology (major hub in Iran)
- Clinical Microbiology (major hub in Iran)
- Advanced Electronic Education (major hub in Iran)

SUMS specializes in the following medical procedures:

- Organ Transplantation (liver, heart, kidney, et cetera)
- Cochlear Implant
- Interventional Radiology
- Minimally Invasive Surgeries (laparoscopy)
- Bone Marrow Transplantation
- Surgical and Interventional Cardiology Procedures
- Ophthalmic Surgical Procedures
- Interventional Urology
- Interventional Oncology
- Interventional and Surgical Orthopedics
- Interventional Thoracic Surgery
- Interventional Infertility Treatment
- Coronary Angiography
- Hepatic Angiography
- Cancer Radiation Therapy and Chemotherapy
- Orthopedic Surgeries Fetal Surgery
- IVF and Infertility Treatment
- Spine Surgery Neurosurgery Procedures
- Otolaryngology-Head and Neck Surgery
- Advanced Electronic Learning
- Clinical Immunology
- Clinical Microbiology

== Hospitals ==
=== Namazi Hospital ===
Nemazee Hospital (In Persian language: بیمارستان نمازی), also known as Shiraz University Hospital (Namazi), is a prominent hospital in Namazi Square, Shiraz, Iran. It was founded by Mohammad Nemazee in 1950. Mohammad Nemazee founded this hospital with 22 residential villas for physicians in 1950.

=== Khalili Hospital ===
Khalili Hospital (In Persian language: بیمارستان خلیلی) is a university affiliated teaching and treatment hospital in Shiraz, Fars province, Iran. It is affiliated with the university and has 86 active beds. The hospital was founded in 1966. The facility includes emergency services, eye and cornea transplantation, ear transplantation, cochlear implantation, ophthalmology, reconstructive surgery, ENT, operating rooms, and other paraclinical and outpatient units.

Khalili Hospital and Educational Center was established in 1966 by Mohammad Khalil Khalili Shirazi with a building area of approximately 2,500 m^{2}, fully equipped with scientific and technical facilities, and endowed to Shiraz University of Medical Sciences.

Initially operating with a capacity of 25 beds, the hospital has undergone renovations and expansions over the years. It now has 86 beds and a total floor area of about 8,534 m^{2}, serving as a specialized and subspecialized center for ophthalmology and otolaryngology in southern Iran.

=== Poostchi Subspecialty Eye Hospital and Clinic ===
Poostchi Subspecialty Eye Hospital and Clinic (درمانگاه و بیمارستان چشم پوستچی) is a teaching and treatment center located in Shiraz, Fars Province, Iran, affiliated with the university. It was founded in 1958.

In 1952, serious eye diseases such as trachoma, cataracts, glaucoma, and chronic corneal diseases were widespread in Shiraz and its surrounding towns, often leading to blindness due to limited medical and sanitary facilities. In June 1952, Enayatollah Poostchi traveled to the United Kingdom for medical treatment. During his stay, he frequently discussed with relatives and friends his intention to establish an ophthalmology clinic and hospital, considering it one of his main goals.

Upon returning from his trip, Poostchi purchased a 2,517 m^{2} plot of land on Zand Street, one of Shiraz's prime locations, and allocated 400,000 tomans from his personal funds for the hospital's construction. After his death in 1952, the trustee of his estate sold part of Poostchi's personal property to raise funds for the project. Construction work on the hospital began in 1958, but due to factors such as insufficient budget, progress was slow. Eventually, in 1963, the 1,500 m^{2} clinic building was completed. In the same year, advanced medical equipment was purchased from Germany and installed, allowing the hospital to begin admitting patients from across the country.

In 1963, the hospital staff included: 1. Dr. Borjis – Hospital Director 2. Dr. Mohammad Hossein Jamalabadi – Ophthalmologist 3. Mohammad Bagher Adeli – Pharmacy Manager 4. Mohammad Hadi Tagha – Accountant 5. Ghasem Honarvar – Guard 6. Asad Zare – Gardener

Over time, with increasing patient visits from southern Iran, the number of physicians and staff grew with the cooperation of Shiraz University.

=== Cooperation with the Faculty of Medicine ===
In 1969, a cooperation agreement was signed between the then-president of Shiraz University, Dr. Nahavandi, and the interim trustee of the endowment. That same year, under the leadership of Dr. Ali-Asghar Khodadoust, head of the Ophthalmology Department of Shiraz Medical School, subspecialty ophthalmology training courses for medical students began. By 1979, the hospital's outpatient clinics had increased to seven.

=== From clinic to hospital ===
In 2000, with the cooperation of the university and the Fars Endowments Organization, the hospital's ophthalmology research department – one of its most important sections – was inaugurated. To provide financial support for the hospital, Enayatollah Poostchi purchased half ownership of the village of Akbarabad Quran, which he endowed to the Poostchi Ophthalmology Hospital under endowment deed No. 16925.

Since 1997, with the efforts of the Endowments and Charity Affairs Organization of Shiraz District 5, the hospital's ophthalmology research center was established with the necessary facilities, considered the first of its kind in Iran.

In 2017, the clinic was equipped with an OCT (optical coherence tomography) device for high-precision imaging of eye layers with reduced error rates – the first of its kind in the public sector.

== Notable alumni ==
- Ali Asghar Khodadoust, Professor of Ophthalmology, originator of the Khodadoust line method
- Kamran Bagheri Lankarani, former Minister of Health and Medical Education of Iran
- Bizhan Aarabi, Professor of Neurosurgery, founder of Neurosurgery Department at SUMS and well-known surgeon for traumatic brain injury
- Farrokh Saidi, Distinguished Prof. of Surgery, well-known surgeon in the US and Iran
- Reza Malekzadeh, Distinguished Prof. of Internal Medicine & Gastroenterology, former Iran's Minister of Health and Medical Education (1991–1993)
- Mostafa Moeen, Prof. of Pediatrics, expertise in Clinical Immunology, former Iran's Minister of Culture and Higher Education (1989- 1993) and former Iran's Minister of Science, Research, and Technology (1997–2003)
- Ashkan Abdollahi, Distinguished Alumni, Yale School of Medicine
- Vahid Bazyari, Distinguished Professor of Palliative Care and Aesthetic Medicine

== See also ==
- Higher education in Iran
- Shiraz University
