= Hassan Nemazee =

American diplomat

Personal details
- Born: January 27, 1950 (age 76) Washington, DC
- Party: Democratic
- Education: Landon School; Harvard University
- Occupation: Chairman/CEO of Nemazee Capital
- Website: Nemazee Capital

Hassan Nemazee (born January 27, 1950) is an Iranian-American multimillionaire businessman, political fundraiser, and author known for his involvement in U.S. Democratic Party fundraising. In 2010 he was convicted of bank fraud and sentenced to 12 years in prison. He was released in 2019.

== Life ==
Nemazee was born in Washington, D.C. on January 27, 1950 into a well-to-do Iranian family. He is the son of Mohammad Nemazee, an Iranian philanthropist known for founding institutions such as the Nemazee Hospital, the Nemazee School of Nursing, and the Shiraz Waterworks. His early life was shaped by the political upheaval of the Iranian Revolution, which forced his family into exile and resulted in the loss of much of their wealth. Following relocation to the United States, Nemazee rebuilt his personal and professional life. He attended Landon School, graduating in 1968. He received his Bachelor of Arts (BA) degree with Honors from Harvard University in 1972.

Nemazee has not returned to Iran since the Iranian revolution. Most of his family's property was seized by the new Iranian government. He later married Malekeh Nazie Eftekhari.

Nemazee is the brother of Susie Nemazee, the wife of the British Ambassador to the United States from 2012-2016, Sir Peter Westmacott.

Nemazee is the Chairman of Nemazee Capital.

Nemazee is the author of Persia, Politics & Prison, a memoir structured in three parts that chronicles his life journey. The book begins with his upbringing in Iran and the impact of the Iranian Revolution, which led to exile and financial loss. It then follows his rise in the United States as a businessman and political figure, including his involvement in high-level fundraising and public affairs.

== Business interests ==
Nemazee built his career in finance and investment banking, primarily through his firm, Nemazee Capital, which he founded in 1987. The firm evolved from earlier ventures associated with Nemazee Holdings and focused initially on real estate development before expanding into a broader range of industries. These included sectors such as healthcare, energy, media, telecommunications, insurance, and asset management.

Earlier in his career, Nemazee was involved in joint ventures with major financial institutions, including partnerships linked to American International Group and banking relationships connected to predecessors of JPMorgan Chase.

He also had connections to investment management firms, including involvement with Carret Asset Management, which managed public funds, including state investment assets in the United States.

== Political involvement ==
During the 2004 United States presidential election, Nemazee was the New York finance chair of the John Kerry Presidential campaign.

He later held a senior national role as finance chairman of the Democratic Senatorial Campaign Committee. Under his tenure, the committee raised approximately $115 million during the 2006 election cycle. With Nemazee as the national finance chair, Chuck Schumer's DSCC in 2006 raised $115 million, outpacing the NRSC by substantial sums, and helping the Democratic Party take control of the Senate.

More recently, Nemazee served as Finance Chairman to Hillary Clinton's 2007-08 presidential campaign, and also donated $50,000 (the maximum amount) to Barack Obama's Presidential Inaugural Committee. In addition, Nemazee was a bundler for the 2009 Presidential Inaugural Committee.

During his presidency, Bill Clinton nominated Nemazee to fill the position of U.S. Ambassador to Argentina.

=== Criminal justice reform ===
In November 2024, Nemazee joined the board of directors of The Fortune Society, a New York-based nonprofit organization that provides services including supportive housing, career development, education, mental health and substance use treatment, and advocacy for people affected by the criminal justice system.

== Other work ==
In 2026, Nemazee and his wife, Nazie Eftekhari Nemazee, funded the two-year Hassan & Nazie Nemazee Fellowship at the University of Minnesota Law School's Clemency Project Clinic. The fellowship supports a lawyer working with the clinic, which represents incarcerated people seeking clemency and reviews cases involving disproportionately long prison sentences.

== Fraud conviction and imprisonment ==
Nemazee was arrested on August 25, 2009 and charged with bank fraud in the United States District Court for the Southern District of New York. Prosecutors charged Nemazee with using "fake account statements and forged signatures to show he had collateral worth hundreds of millions of dollars to fraudulently obtain $292 million in loans from Bank of America, Citibank and HSBC." He was later in 2010 found guilty by judge Sidney H. Stein, who called Nemazee's fraud “breathtaking in its brazenness, in its scope.”, and sentenced in him to 12 years in prison, as well as forfeiture of his assets, including "his $17.75 million Park Avenue duplex; an estate in southern Italy; a blue Maserati; shares in a yacht and private airplane; and $93 million in cash and securities.". Hassan Nemazee was released from prison early in February 2019 under the First Step Act.
