= Ali Asghar Khodadoust =

Iranian eye surgeon

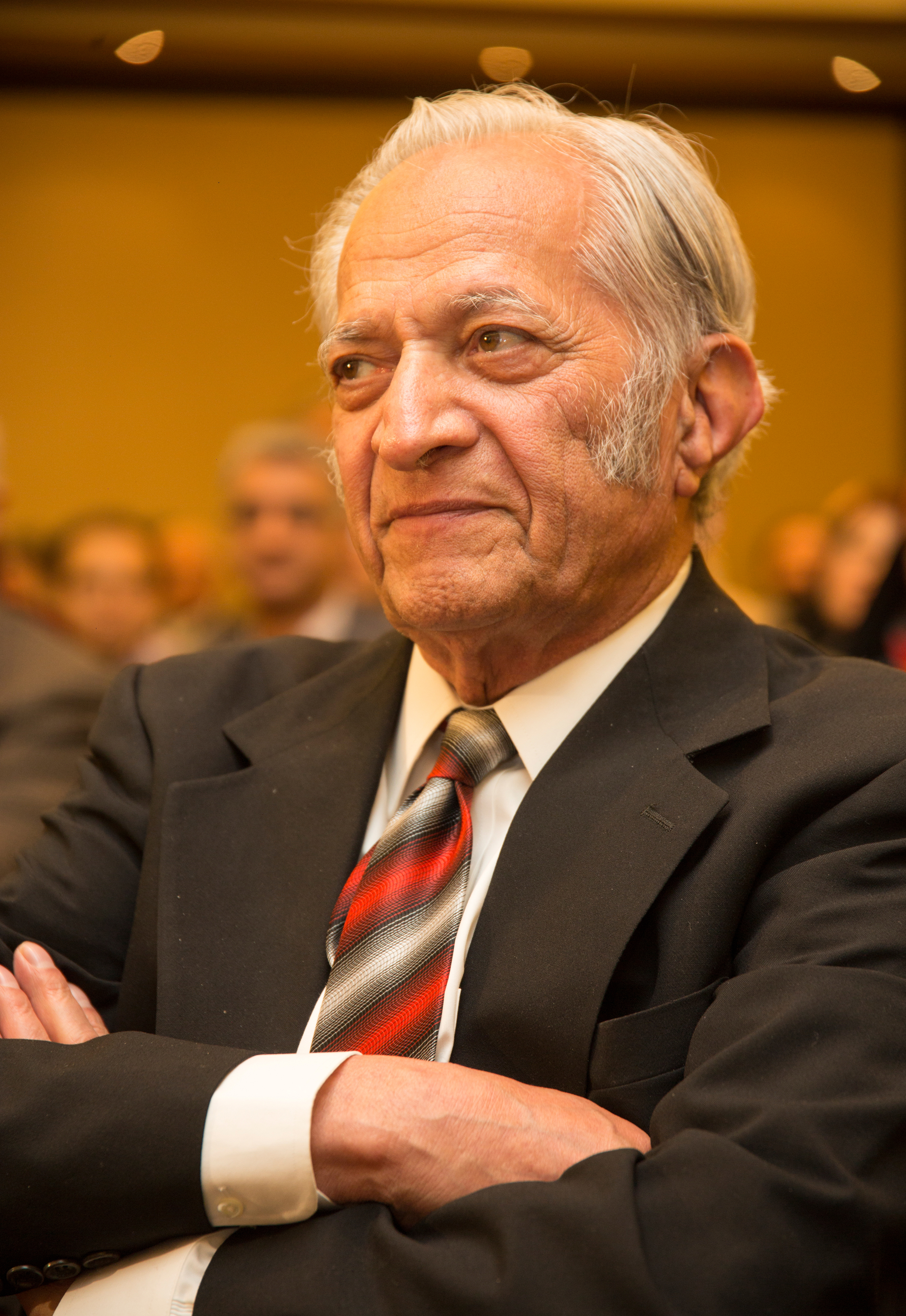
- Born: 27 October 1935; Shiraz, Iran
- Died: 9 March 2018 (aged 82); New York City, US
- Education: Shiraz University
- Children: 5
- Scientific career
- Fields: Ophthalmology

Ali Asghar Khodadoust (Persian: علی‌اصغر خدادوست, 27 October 1935 – 10 March 2018) was an Iranian eye surgeon specializing in corneal transplantation, in whose honor the Khodadoust rejection line is named.

Born in Shiraz, Iran, Dr. Khodadoust was the founder of the Khodadoust Eye Hospital in Shiraz and a long-time faculty member at Yale University and Johns Hopkins University.

Dr. Khodadoust was recognized as one of the world’s leading corneal graft surgeons and the first to describe the endothelial rejection sign known as the Khodadoust line. He was honored by UNESCO in 2015.

He worked at different eye clinics in the U.S. like the Wilmer Eye Institute at the Johns Hopkins School of Medicine and at the Connecticut Ophthalmology Center in New Haven. His medical reputation was the result of his extensive studies on corneal diseases and transplantation biology.

He was the founder of the Ophthalmology Department at Shiraz University of Medical Sciences (SUMS) and conducted a sistership program between Shiraz University of Medical Sciences and Johns Hopkins School of Medicine. During his time, residents and trainees of both parties had a regular rotation for education purposes between Iran and USA. This partnership made a significant progress in ophthalmology field in the Middle East region.

The International Council of Ophthalmology (ICO) through an official visit of Professor Hugh R Taylor AC has granted privileges to Shiraz University of Medical Sciences as the ICO accrediated Fellowship Host and Training Center.

== Death ==
Khodadoust died at NewYork–Presbyterian Hospital in New York City on March 9, 2018. He was 82.
