= Shiraz Water and Wastewater Company =

Shiraz Water & Wastewater Company
- Formerly: Shiraz Water Organization (Dastgāh-e Āb‑e Shiraz); Shiraz Water Supply (Āb-e‑Mashrūb Shiraz)
- Company type: Public utility
- Industry: Water supply, Sanitation
- Founded: 1943 (established on the endowment of Mohammad Namazi)
- Founder: Mohammad Namazi
- Headquarters: Shiraz, Iran
- Services: Water distribution, sewerage services

Shiraz Water and Wastewater Company (In Persian language: شرکت آب و فاضلاب شیراز), is the public utility responsible for supplying drinking water and sanitation services in Shiraz, Iran. It was formerly known as the Shiraz Water Organization (Dastgāh-e Āb‑e Shiraz) and Shiraz Water Supply (Āb-e‑Mashrūb Shiraz).

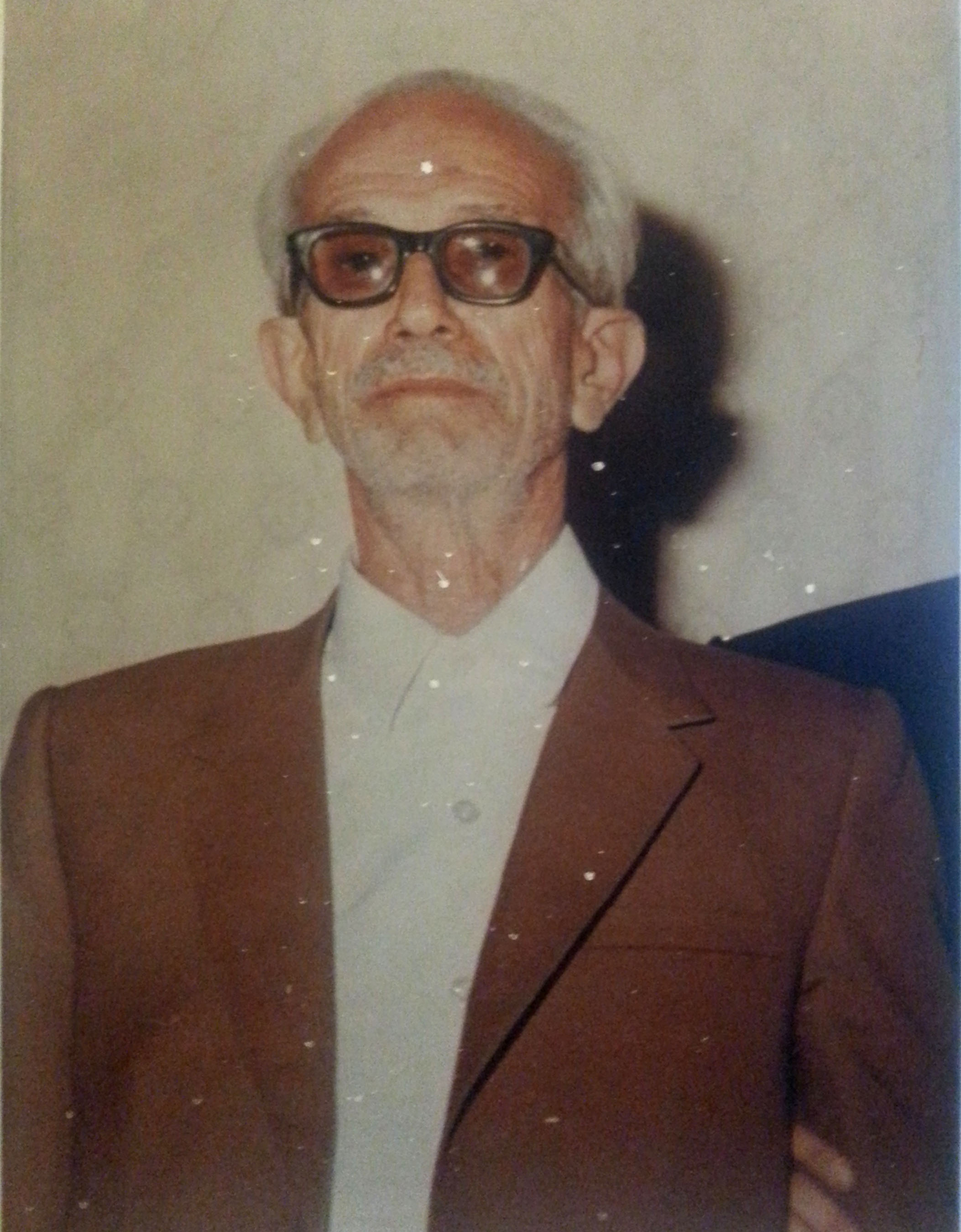
Mohammad Namazi, founder of the Shiraz Water Organization (1943)

== History ==
=== Origins and foundation ===
The modern water supply system of Shiraz was initiated in 1943 under the philanthropic endowment established by Hajj Mohammad Namazi. Namazi, noticing the serious health implications of unsafe drinking water in Shiraz, founded the Shiraz Water Organization in 1943 to pipe, treat, and distribute water from the city’s qanats (Kheyrabad and Rezaabad). Initially, about 6,000 households were connected.

=== Expansion ===
British consulting engineer Alexander Gibb determined that the qanat's flow was insufficient and contaminated; he recommended drilling deep wells and building a treatment plant. A comprehensive infrastructure plan including 10–16 deep wells, a large filtration plant, pumping station, independent power generation, and a piped distribution network was implemented between 1942 and September 1950 (Shahrivar 1329 SH). By 1952, approximately 12,000 homes were connected to piped water.

=== Institutional development ===
In 1968 (1347 SH), the organization was renamed Shiraz Water Supply (Āb-e‑Mashrūb Shiraz). Later, in 1990, it was incorporated as Shiraz Water & Wastewater Company. In June 1991, the company was restructured under the broader Fars Province Water & Wastewater Company. In March 1998, Shiraz Water & Wastewater Company was officially separated as an independent entity again.

By 1997–1998 (1376 SH), the number of subscribers exceeded 230,000, prompting the final breakup from Fars-wide company and the independent formation of Shiraz Water & Wastewater Company in December 1997.

== Services and projects ==
Supplied potable water to over 6,000 subscribers at inception. By 1978 (1357 SH), served around 70,000 subscribers, with water stored in a 25,000 m³ reservoir sourced from aquifer wells. Integrated supply from Doroodzan Dam (capacity ~150,000 m³/day) starting in the late 1970s to meet growing demand.

The company also oversaw the construction of Shiraz’s first municipal sewer line in the late 1960s–1970s, initially serving the academic campus and dormitories, later expanded during the Cultural Revolution era as part of broader urban sanitation planning.

== Endowment and charitable structure ==
Mohammad Namazi endowed the water utility, stipulating that revenues, after covering operational and maintenance costs, would support Namazi Hospital (also founded by him) to ensure continuity and social benefit beyond political changes.
