= Khodadoust line =

- Differential diagnosis: complication of corneal graft surgery

A Khodadoust line or chronic focal transplant reaction is a medical sign that indicates a complication of corneal graft surgery on the eye. This method is called Khodadoust line because of many years research about this by Professor Ali Asghar Khodadoust. This medical condition is similar to organ rejection after an organ transplant, except that it involves immunological rejection of a transplanted cornea rather than an internal organ.

A Khodadoust line is made up of mononuclear cells (white blood cells). These cells appear at the vascularized edge of the recently transplanted cornea. If untreated, the line of white blood cells will move across and damage the endothelial cells of the cornea over the space of several days.

Prompt treatment by immunosuppression can prevent further damage.
