= Paul Terasaki =

American transplant researcher (1929–2016)

Paul I. Terasaki
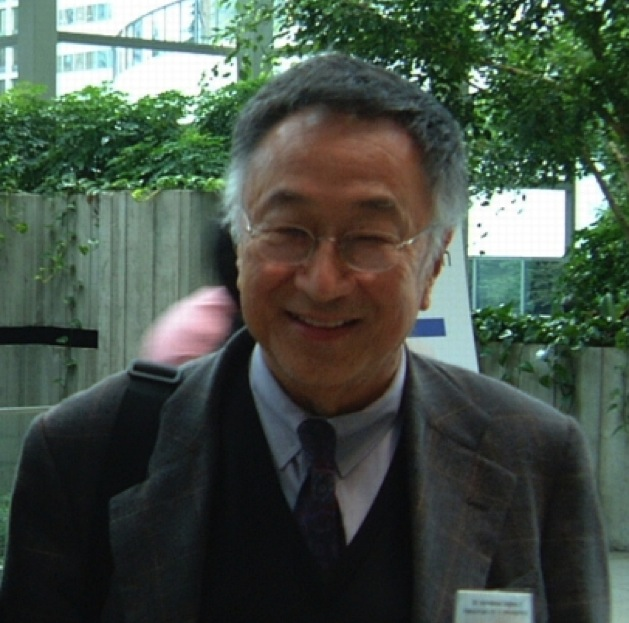
- Born: September 10, 1929; Los Angeles, California, US
- Died: January 25, 2016 (aged 86); Beverly Hills, California, US
- Education: UCLA
- Known for: organ transplant medicine; tissue typing
- Awards: UCLA Terasaki Life Sciences Building

Paul Ichiro Terasaki (Japanese: 寺崎一郎, September 10, 1929 – January 25, 2016) was an American scientist in the field of human organ transplant technology, and professor emeritus of surgery at UCLA School of Medicine.

He spent three high school years during World War II interned with his family and other Japanese Americans in the Gila River War Relocation Center. Later he earned his bachelor's, master's, and doctorate in zoology all from UCLA and was appointed to the medical school faculty.

In 1964, Terasaki developed the microcytotoxicity test, a tissue-typing test for organ transplant donors and recipients that required only 1 microliter each of antisera used to identify human leukocyte antigens (HLA). The test was adopted as the international standard for tissue typing. He has focused on study of the humoral theory of transplant rejection, which states that antibodies cause allograft rejection. He and his corporation, One Lambda, have played a central role in the development of tissue typing and transplantation surgery.

Terasaki established UCLA's HLA laboratory, and also established the UCLA Kidney Transplant Registry, the largest in the world. In 1999, he retired from UCLA, but within a year resumed his academic pursuits with the creation of the Terasaki Foundation, a research center dedicated to cancer immunotherapy and the study of humoral immunity and transplantation.

On May 13, 2010, UCLA announced the naming of the new life science building for Terasaki, who has given $50 million to the Division of Life Sciences in the UCLA College of Letters and Science, which is the largest ever given to the UCLA College. The structure is known as the Terasaki Life Sciences Building. He was awarded the 2011 UCLA Edward A. Dickson Alumnus of the Year award on April 13, 2012, and the UCLA medal on June 15, 2012.

Paul Terasaki was married to artist Hisako Terasaki; they had four children.

He died on January 25, 2016, after a long illness.

He also endowed the Terasaki Institute for Biomedical Innovation, that is pushing forward his vision of scientific translation and academic entrepreneurship.

== Publications ==
- Terasaki PI, McClelland JD. Microdroplet assay of human serum cytotoxins. Nature 1964; 204: 998–1000.
- Terasaki PI. Resolution by HLA testing of 1000 paternity cases not excluded by ABO testing. J Family Law 1977; 16: 543–557.
- Scholsstein L, Terasaki PI, Bluestone R, Pearson CM. High association of an HLA antigen, w27, with ankylosing spondylitis. N Engl J Med 1973; 228: 704–706.
- Collins GM, Bravo-Shugarman M, Terasaki PI. Kidney preservation for transportation. Initial perfusion and 30 hour ice storage. Lancet 1969; ii: 1219.
- Takemoto SK, Terasaki PI, Gjertson DW, Cecka JM. Twelve years’ experience with national sharing of HLA matched cadaveric kidneys for transplantation. N Engl J Med 2000; 343: 1078–1084.
- Terasaki PI, Marchioro TL, Starzl TE. Serotyping of human lymphocyte antigens. Preliminary trials on long-term kidney homograft survivors. Nat Acad Sci Monograph 1965; 83–96.
- Terasaki PI, ed. History of HLA. Ten Recollections. Los Angeles: UCLA Tissue Typing Laboratory; 1990.
- Patel R, Terasaki PI. Significance of the positive crossmatch test in kidney transplantation. N Engl J Med 1969; 280: 735–739.
- Nishikawa K, Terasaki PI. Annual trends and triple therapy – 1991–2000. In: Cecka, JM, Terasaki, PI, eds. Clinical Transplants 2001. Los Angeles: UCLA Immunogenetics Center; 2002, pp. 247–270.
- Terasaki PI. Red cell crossmatching for heart transplants (letter). N Engl J Med 1991; 325: 1748.
- Mickey MR, Kreisler M, Albert ED, Tanaka N, Terasaki PI. Analysis of HLA incompatibility in human renal transplants. Tissue Antigens 1971; 2: 57–67.
- Terasaki PI, Cecka JM, Gjertson DW, Takemoto S. High survival rates of kidney transplants from spousal and living unrelated donors. N Engl J Med 1995; 333: 333–336.
- Terasaki PI, Mickey MR, Kreisler M. Presensitization and kidney transplant failures. Postgrad Med 1970; 47: 89–100.
- Opelz G, Sengar DPS, Mickey MR, Terasaki PI. Effect of blood transfusions on subsequent kidney transplants. Transplant Proc 1973; 4: 253–259.
- Terasaki PI, Cho YW, Cecka JM. Editorial: Strategy for eliminating the kidney shortage. In: Cecka, M, Terasaki, PI, eds. Clinical Transplants 1997. Los Angeles: UCLA Tissue Typing Laboratory; 1998, pp. 265–267.
- Mckenna RM, Takemoto SK, Terasaki PI. Anti-HLA antibodies after solid organ transplantation. Transplantation 2000; 69:319–326.
- Lee PC, Terasaki PI, Takemoto SK et al. All chronic rejection failures of kidney transplants were preceded by the development of HLA antibodies. Transplantation 2002; 74: 1192–1194.
- Terasaki PI. Antibody response to homografts. I. Preliminary studies of the time of appearance of lymphoagglutinins upon homografting. Am Surg 1959; 11: 896–899.
- Terasaki PI. The humoral theory of transplantation. Am J Transpl 2003; 3: 665–673.
- Terasaki PI, Cai J. Humoral theory of transplantation: further evidence. Curr Opin Immunol. 2005；17(5):541-5.
- Cai J, Terasaki PI. Humoral theory of transplantation: mechanism, prevention, and treatment. Hum Immunol. 2005；66(4):334-42.
- Terasaki PI, Cai J. Human leukocyte antigen antibodies and chronic rejection: from association to causation. Transplantation. 2008;86(3):377-83
- Cho YW, Terasaki PI, Cecka JM, Gjertson DW. Transplantation of kidneys from donors whose heart has stopped beating. N Engl J Med 1998; 338: 221–225.
- Terasaki, Hisako; Paul Terasaki (c. 1998). Hisako Terasaki : a self portrait. Los Angeles, Calif.: H. and P. Terasaki. ISBN 0-9659522-0-7. LCCN 97090921.
- Satya N. Chatterjee; Paul I. Terasaki, cochairmen, eds. (1977). International Symposium on Kidney Procurement, Preservation, and Sharing for Clinical Transplantation, University of California, Los Angeles, March 25–26, 1977. New York: Grune & Stratton. LCCN 77155060.
- Paul I. Terasaki, ed. (1980). Histocompatibility testing, 1980 : report of the eighth International Histocompatibility Workshop held in Los Angeles, California, USA, 4–10 February 1980. Los Angeles, Calif.: UCLA Tissue Typing Laboratory. LCCN 80036737.
- Paul I. Terasaki, ed. (1970). Histocompatibility testing 1970; report of an international workshop held at UCLA and Palm Springs, California, U.S.A. 20-26, January 1970 and the Fourth International Histocompatibility Conference at Los Angeles, California, U.S.A. 27-29, January 1970. Baltimore: Williams & Wilkins. LCCN 73026161.
- Jawahar L. Tiwari; Paul I. Terasaki (1985). HLA and disease associations. New York: Springer-Verlag. ISBN 0-387-96081-3. LCCN 84020294.
- Paul I. Terasaki, ed. (1982). Blood transfusion and transplantation. New York: Grune & Stratton. ISBN 0-8089-1522-3. LCCN 82082458.
