= Nicholas Theodore =

American neurosurgeon

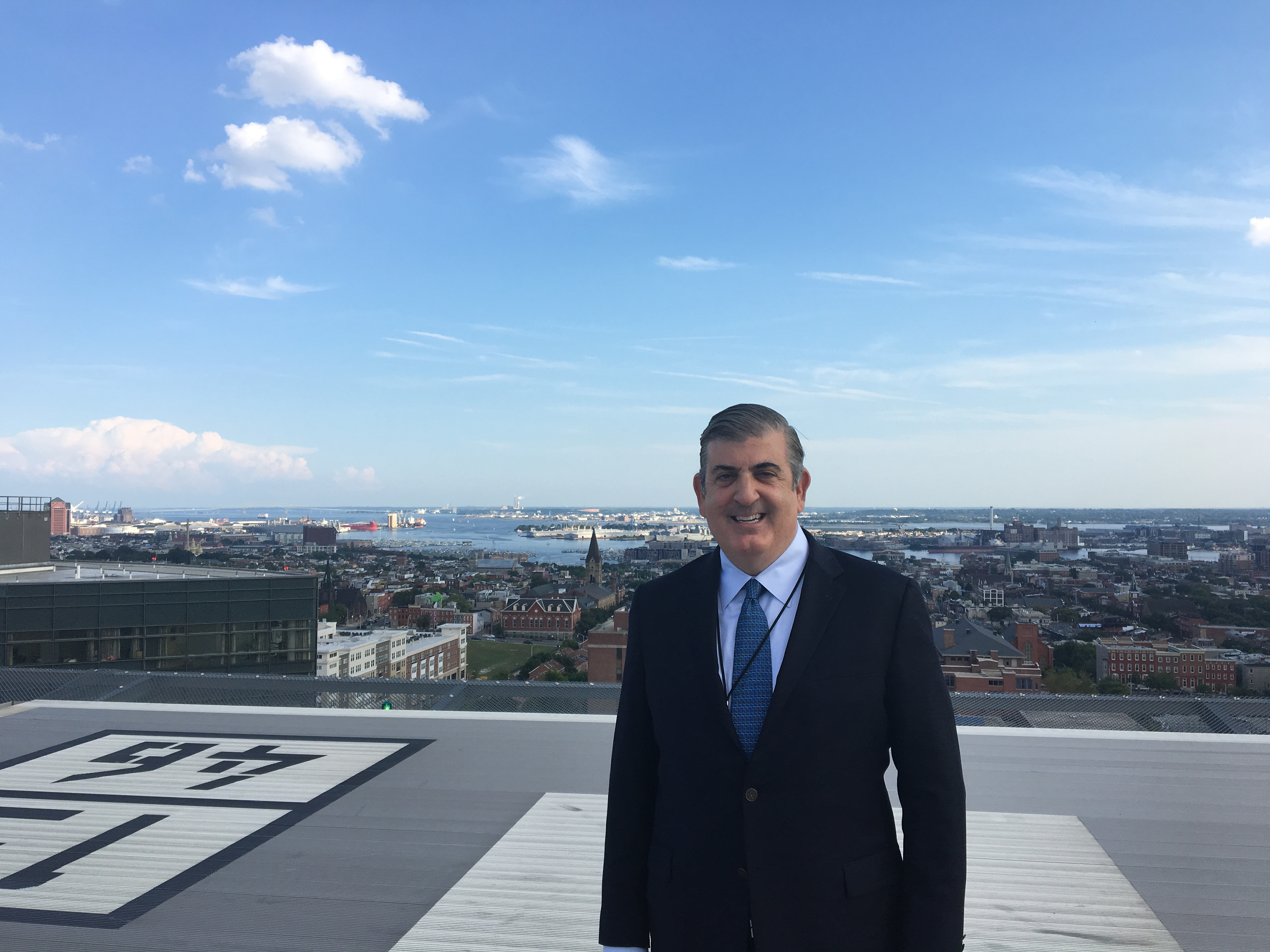
- Nicholas Theodore at Johns Hopkins Hospital
- Born: San Diego, California, U.S.
- Education: Cornell University; Georgetown University School of Medicine
- Awards: Mayfield Award (CNS), Tasker Award (CNS), "Teacher of the Year" (BNI, 2007, 2014), US News "Top Docs," Cornell Tradition Academic Fellowship
- Scientific career
- Fields: Trauma Neurosurgery, Spine, Robotics, Spinal Cord Injury
- Workplaces: Johns Hopkins University

Nicholas Theodore is an American neurosurgeon and researcher at University of Arizona College of Medicine – Phoenix/Banner - University Medical Center Phoenix. He is known for his work in spinal trauma, minimally invasive surgery, robotics, and personalized medicine. He previously was the Director of the Neurosurgical Spine Program at Johns Hopkins and Co-Director of the Carnegie Center for Surgical Innovation at Johns Hopkins.

Theodore graduated from Cornell University, where he was the recipient of a Cornell Tradition Academic Fellowship. He attended medical school at Georgetown University, where he graduated with honors. After completing his internship at Bethesda Naval Hospital, he served as a Senior General Medical Officer with the United States Marine Corps in Okinawa, Japan.

He completed his neurosurgical residency and a fellowship in spinal surgery at the Barrow Neurological Institute. After completing his residency in 2001, he served as Chief of the Division of Neurosurgery at Naval Medical Center San Diego, overseeing the largest neurosurgery complement in the Navy.

In 2003, Theodore joined the faculty at the Barrow Neurological Institute, and assumed the position of Director of Neurotrauma. In 2004 he was appointed Associate Director of the Neurosurgery Residency Program at Barrow. The Neurosurgery Residency Program at Barrow is the largest in the United States, training four residents per academic year, for a total of 28 residents. In 2009 he became the Chief of the Spine Section at the Barrow Neurological Institute and was appointed the Volker K.H. Sonntag Chair in 2015. In 2016 he became the second Donlin M. Long Professor of Neurosurgery at Johns Hopkins Hospital. Theodore also held professorships in Orthopedics and Biomedical Engineering at Johns Hopkins. He is also actively involved in the area of preventative medicine within neurosurgery. He has been associated with the ThinkFirst Foundation for several years, having served as the foundation’s Medical Director and President. In 2017, he was appointed to the National Football League’s Head, Neck and Spine Committee, of which he became Chairman in 2018. In 2020, Michael J. Fox revealed in his memoir that Theodore performed a surgery on him to remove an ependymoma in Fox’s spinal cord.

== Research ==
Theodore's main research focus is on complex spinal disorders, spinal cord injury, and advanced surgical technologies. He has published over 300 peer-reviewed articles and book chapters, and has given more than 300 technical presentations. He is the recipient of several awards, including the Mayfield Award and the Tasker Award from the Congress of Neurological Surgeons, as well as being named in "US News Top Docs". He was one of the senior investigators in a multi-center study that tested a new medication for patients with spinal cord injury. He has received an NIH RO-1 grant to study novel approaches to spinal surgery, as well as the development of customized devices for patients with spinal cord injury. Less than 10% of these grants are funded nationally.

In 2014, Theodore was the recipient of a United States Department of Defense grant to conduct a multi-center study evaluating the drainage of cerebrospinal fluid to treat of acute spinal cord injury. In 2010, he founded Excelsius Surgical along with Neil Crawford and Mitch Foster, focusing on the development of a mobile real-time image-guided robot for spinal, brain, and biopsy applications. He sold Excelsius Surgical to Globus Medical four years later. In August 2017, the Globus Medical ExcelsiusGPS robot received 510k clearance by the FDA and Theodore performed the first case on October 4, 2017.

In 2020, Theodore, and his team, received a grant in the amount of $13.48 million from the Defense Advanced Research Projects Agency’s (DARPA) Bridging the Gap+ program to fund research in new approaches to treatment of spinal cord injury. With this grant, Theodore and his team, including biomedical engineer Amir Manbachi, are involved in efforts to treat patients with spinal cord injury by integrating novel imaging and therapeutic ultrasound and electrical modalities.

In 2020, Theodore published the largest series of patients who had undergone vertebral column shortening for tethered spinal cord syndrome. This article, which has the longest follow-up of other published series, established this procedure as a viable alternative to standard interventions. In 2023, the team received the FDA's 'Breakthrough Device Designation' for implantable ultrasound sensors for patients with spinal cord injury.

Theodore joined the medical advisory board for Harvard MedTech, which specializes in developing new treatments that combine Virtual reality, behavioral health coaching and Artificial intelligence algorithms to retrain neural pathways within the brain.

== Recent publications ==
- Tsehay, Y; Zeng, Y; Weber-Levine, C; Awosika, T; Kerensky, M; Hersh, AM; Ou, Z; Jiang, K; Bhimreddy, M; Bauer, SJ; Theodore, JN; Quiroz, VM; Suk, I; Alomari, S; Sun, J; Tong, S; Thakor, NJ; Doloff, JC; Theodore, N; Manbachi, A (Jan 2023). "Low-Intensity Pulsed Ultrasound Neuromodulation of a Rodent's Spinal Cord Suppresses Motor Evoked Potentials". IEEE Transactions on Biomedical Engineering. 70 (7): 1992–2001. Bibcode:2023ITBE...70.1992T. doi:10.1109/TBME.2022.3233345. PMC 10510849. PMID 37018313. S2CID 255677715.
- Martirosyan, NL; Kalb, S; Cavalcanti, DD; Lochhead, RA; Uschold, TD; Loh, A; Theodore, N (2011). "Comparative Analysis of Isocentric 3-dimensional C-arm Fluoroscopy and Biplanar Fluoroscopy for Anterior Screw Fixation in Odontoid Fractures". J Spinal Disord Tech. 26 (4): 189–93. doi:10.1097/BSD.0b013e31823f62c7. PMID 22158300. S2CID 38106839.
- Kalb, S; Reis, MT; Cowperthwaite, MC; Fox, DJ; Lefevre, R; Theodore, N; Papadopoulos, SM; Sonntag, VK (2011). "Dysphagia After Anterior Cervical Spine Surgery: Incidence and Risk Factors". World Neurosurg. 77 (1): 183–7. doi:10.1016/j.wneu.2011.07.004. PMID 22155226.
- Brasiliense, LB; Lazaro, BC; Reyes, PM; Dogan, S; Theodore, N; Crawford, NR (Dec 2011). "Biomechanical contribution of the rib cage to thoracic stability". Spine. 36 (26): E1686–93. doi:10.1097/brs.0b013e318219ce84. PMID 22138782. S2CID 19570292.
- Kalani, MY; Martirosyan, NL; Little, AS; Kakarla, UK; Theodore, N (Dec 2011). "Tumoral calcinosis presenting as a deformity of the thoracic spine". J Neurosurg Pediatr. 8 (6): 584–7. doi:10.3171/2011.8.peds11193. PMID 22132916.
- Kalani MY, Filippidis A, Martirosyan NL, Theodore N. "Cerebral Herniation as a Complication of Chest Tube Drainage of Cerebrospinal Fluid After Injury to the Spine. World Neurosurg. 2011;
- Kalb S, Martirosyan NL, Kalani MY, Broc GG, Theodore N. "Genetics of the Degenerated Intervertebral Disc. World Neurosurg. 2011;
- Albuquerque, FC; Hu, YC; Dashti, SR; Abla, AA; Clark, JC; Alkire, B; Theodore, N; McDougall, CG (Dec 2011). "Craniocervical arterial dissections as sequelae of chiropractic manipulation: patterns of injury and management". J Neurosurg. 115 (6): 1197–205. doi:10.3171/2011.8.jns111212. PMID 21923248.
- Martirosyan, NL; Feuerstein, JS; Theodore, N; Cavalcanti, DD; Spetzler, RF; Preul, MC (Sep 2011). "Blood supply and vascular reactivity of the spinal cord under normal and pathological conditions". J Neurosurg Spine. 15 (3): 238–51. doi:10.3171/2011.4.spine10543. hdl:2286/R.I.38384. PMID 21663407.
