= Mohammad Nemazee =

Iranian businessman (1896–1972)

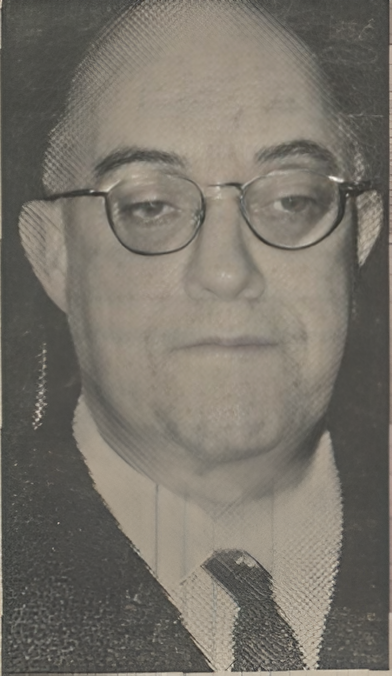
Mohammad Namazi

Mohammad Nemazee (Persian: محمد نمازی; also known as Mohammad Namazi; 1896 – April 9, 1972) was an Indian-born businessman and philanthropist. He was the founder of Namazi Hospital which he founded in 1955 and the first water pipe system company in Iran, Shiraz Water and Wastewater Company in Shiraz, Iran.

== Life ==
Namazi was born in 1896, in Bombay, British Indian Empire (now India). He spent his childhood in China and India, and his youth in Tehran and Shiraz. In 1924, he travelled to America, and stayed there for more than 30 years.

After a successful economic career, he returned to Iran. He noticed the poor quality of the drinking water in Shiraz and in 1952 devoted part of his wealth to establishing a water supply network in the region. In 1955 he founded and equipped Namazi hospital as a teaching hospital.

He donated the Shiraz Water and Wastewater Company income to the hospital. He also made Namazi Nursing School, Namazi Children's Orphanage, and Namazi Art School.

At the age of 76, on 9th April 1972 he died in the hospital he founded.
