= Michael Fehlings =

Michael Fehlings is a Canadian neurosurgeon based at Toronto Western Hospital in Toronto, Ontario, Canada. Dr. Fehlings specializes in complex spine surgery with a special interest in traumatic and non-traumatic spinal cord injury and spine oncology. He mainly focuses on preclinical and clinical translational research related to enhancing repair and regeneration of the injured central nervous system. He holds many positions, including Professor of Neurosurgery at the University of Toronto, Vice Chair Research at the University of Toronto, Robert Campeau Foundation/Dr. C.H. Tator Chair in Brain and Spinal Cord Research at UHN, Scientist at the McEwen Centre for Regenerative Medicine, McLaughlin Scholar in Molecular Medicine, and Co-Director of the University of Toronto Spine Program. He is the past inaugural Director of the University of Toronto Neuroscience Program, and was the previous Medical Director at Toronto Western Hospital. Dr. Fehlings is a Fellow of the American College of Surgeons and a Fellow of the Royal College of Surgeons of Canada.

== Biography ==
He completed his MD at the University of Toronto, followed by his core training in general surgery at Queen's University. He returned to the University of Toronto to complete his PhD, and was awarded his fellowship of the Royal College of Surgeons of Canada, followed by a post-doctoral fellowship in New York. Dr. Fehlings specializes in spinal cord injury and has an active clinical practice as well as research at both the laboratory and clinical levels in the area. His research focuses preclinically on translationally relevant models of spinal cord and brain injury, and clinically on disorders of the spine/spinal cord. His peer-reviewed publications number over 1,200 spanning clinical and basic science.

Work from his 1996 publication in the Journal of Neuroscience characterizing the secondary injury cascade following spinal cord injury (Agrawal and Fehlings, 1996) resulted in receipt of the Gold Medal from the Royal College of Physicians and Surgeons. This work has been translated into ongoing clinical trials examining riluzole for traumatic and nontraumatic spinal cord injury. In stem cell research, Dr. Fehlings' 2006 paper in the Journal of Neuroscience (Karimi-Abdolrezaee et al., 2006;) provides strong evidence of the functional impact of neural stem cells in repairing/regenerating injured spinal cords through remyelination of axons. This finding has been key in leading clinical translational efforts to use neural stem cells for spinal cord injury.

His research has impacted clinical practice as evidenced by the 2012 publication of results from the Surgical Timing in Acute Spinal Cord Injury Study (STASCIS), which provided direct clinical trials evidence that early decompressive surgery improves neurological and functional outcomes after spinal cord injury. This trial is having an important impact on how spinal trauma is managed. In 2017 and 2024 Dr. Fehlings led an international effort to develop clinical practice guidelines for degenerative cervical myelopathy and traumatic spinal cord injury. Dr. Fehlings' work demonstrating that midcervical excitatory interneurons are essential for the maintenance of breathing in non-traumatic cervical SCI and critical for promoting respiratory recovery after traumatic SCI was published in Nature.

== Honours ==
Dr. Fehlings has been honoured with several awards and medals including the Reeve-Irvine Medal in Spinal Cord Injury (2012, jointly with Dr. Tator), the Olivecrona Award by the Karolinska Institute (2009), the Henry Farfan award from the North American Spine Society (2013), and the Richard H. Winn prize (2013), presented by the Society of Neurological Surgeons. He received the Diamond Jubilee medal (2013) for his ground-breaking work in childhood neurodevelopmental disorders and spinal cord injury and disease. This was presented by Canadian Prime Minister Stephen Harper. He has also been inducted into the Canadian Academy of Health Science and as a Fellow of the Royal Society of Canada. In 2016 he received the Mentor of the Year Award from the Royal College of Physicians and Surgeons. Dr. Fehlings is frequently invited to speak internationally and has spoken in over 35 countries. He was described, during the Henry Farfan Award ceremony, as the "single most influential active spinal cord injury researcher and clinician in the world". In 2019, the Right Honourable Jacinda Ardern, Prime Minister of New Zealand, presented him with the Ryman Prize for his work enhancing the quality of life for older people. In 2025 Dr. Fehlings was awarded the King Charles III Coronation Medal in recognition of significant contributions and service to Canada.
