= Hisako Terasaki =

American etcher (1928–2024)

Hisako Terasaki (born Hisako Sumioka; November 2, 1928 – April 15, 2024) was an American etcher.

== Early years ==
Terasaki was born in Los Angeles, California on November 2, 1928. Her parents were economic migrants from Japan to the United States at the turn of the 20th century. Her father, Suichi Sumioka received a degree in Engineering from Stanford University, but after encountering discrimination in his attempts to obtain a job, he eventually came to own a flower shop in East Los Angeles. In 1942, in the midst of her parents' struggle to establish themselves, Hisako and her family, all United States citizens, were removed to Poston War Relocation Center in Arizona as part of Executive Order 9066 in response to the Japanese bombing of Pearl Harbor. After World War II, the Sumioka family had to split up for a few years as each member worked to get the family back on its feet. Hisako working as a live-in housekeeper while attending high school; her mother died when she was 18.

== Middle years ==
Terasaki went on to study Art at Los Angeles City College, but under pressure from her family to pursue a more practical career, she obtained her B.A. degree in Education from Los Angeles State College in 1954. During this year, she also married Paul Ichiro Terasaki after meeting at their local Methodist church. They both were Nisei generation, their parents having emigrated from Japan, and they had in common internment during World War II, and a relatively impoverished upbringing in East Los Angeles. After teaching elementary school for one year, Terasaki had three sons and a daughter between 1954 and 1962. While raising a family and supporting what would become her husband's distinguished and busy academic career in Transplantation at UCLA, Terasaki pursued her activities in printmaking, exhibiting mainly in the Los Angeles area. The subject matter of her work reflected her extensive travels accompanying her husband around the world and her constant care of four children. In fact, her most prolific period artistically was during the busy years of the 1970s and 1980s.

== Later life and death ==
Once their children were grown, Terasaki and her husband became more involved in the Los Angeles community. They supported cultural, academic and church-related activities, reflecting their lifelong interests. Later in their lives, Paul and Hisako would be able to offer significant philanthropic support to the Japanese American community.

Terasaki died on April 15, 2024, at the age of 95. She was interred at Rose Hills Memorial Park.

== Further information ==
=== Exhibitions ===
- 1978: The Framecompany, Los Gatos, California
- 1979: Second Annual Bay Area Women's Graphic Arts Competition, California
- 1979: Los Angeles Art Association Gallery, California
- 1980: Los Angeles Art Association Gallery, California
- 1980: Garendo Gallery, Studio City, California
- 1980: Montalvo Art Center, Saratoga, California
- 1981: San Jose Center for the Performing Arts, California
- 1981: Fourth Annual Print show, Westwood Center of the Arts, Los Angeles, California
- 1982: LAPS Membership Print Exhibition at the Multicultural Arts Institute, San Diego, California
- 1983: Ninth International Miniature Print Exhibition, Pratt Graphics Center Gallery, New York City

=== Books ===
- Paul Terasaki, Scrapbook: A Photo Album of Memories,
- Through Innocent Eyes
- Terasaki, Hisako; Paul Terasaki (c. 1998). Hisako Terasaki : a self portrait. Los Angeles, Calif.: H. and P. Terasaki. ISBN 0-9659522-0-7. LCCN 97090921.

=== Philanthropic support ===
- UCLA Paul I and Hisako Terasaki Center for Japanese Studies,
- Japanese American National Museum, Los Angeles,
- The Pavilion, Los Angeles County Museum of Art
- National Japanese American Memorial Foundation Washington DC
- First United Methodist Church, Los Angeles
- UCLA Terasaki Life Sciences Building

=== Web site with prints ===
http://www.terasaki.us/concord/prints/index.html
