= Nemazee Hospital =

Coordinates: 29.6313°N 52.5176°E

Geography
- Location: Namazi Square, Shiraz, Iran

History
- Opened: 1950

Links
- Website: namazi.sums.ac.ir
- Lists: Hospitals in Iran

Nemazee Hospital (In Persian language: بیمارستان نمازی), also known as Shiraz University Hospital (Namazi), is a prominent hospital in Namazi Square, Shiraz, Iran. It was founded by Mohammad Nemazee in 1950. Mohammad Nemazee founded this hospital with 22 residential villas for physicians in 1950.

== History ==
Nemazee Hospital was founded by Iranian philanthropist Mohammad Nemazee in the mid-20th century as part of his broader efforts to improve public health infrastructure in his birthplace of Shiraz.

After the death of Mohammad Nemazee in 1972, his son Hassan Nemazee he became the chairman of the board of nemzaee hospital.

The establishment of Nemazee Hospital was part of a broader charitable movement in Shiraz, following earlier medical facilities such as Behboudestan-e Nemazee and missionary hospitals. Nemazee collaborated with medical professionals, including Dr. Torab Mehra an Iranian physician trained in the United States to expand the project into a large modern medical center.

It was later extended in 1975 and a polyclinic building, a six-storey parking and some affiliated buildings were constructed. The admission capacity of the hospital rose from 200 to 750 beds. The first liver transplant was performed in 1993 in Shiraz University Hospital (Namazi). The first living-related kidney transplantation performed at Shiraz University Hospital dates back to 1968. The hospital has an active oncology department publishing papers regularly.

== See also ==
- Khalili Hospital
- Poostchi Subspecialty Eye Hospital and Clinic
- Shiraz University of Medical Sciences
